= List of ecoregions in Canada =

Terrestrial ecoregions of Canada

The following is a list of ecoregions in Canada as identified by the World Wide Fund for Nature (WWF).

== Terrestrial ecoregions ==
The terrestrial ecoregions of Canada are all within the Nearctic realm, which includes most of North America. The Nearctic, together with Eurasia's Palearctic realm, constitutes the Holarctic realm of the Northern Hemisphere.

British Columbia is the most biodiverse province with 18 ecoregions across 4 biomes. By contrast, Prince Edward Island is the least biodiverse with just one ecoregion - the Gulf of St. Lawrence lowland forests - encompassing the entire province.

Biome	Ecoregion	Province/Territory
Boreal forests/taiga	Central Canadian Shield forests	Ontario, Quebec
Boreal forests/taiga	Eastern Canadian forests	New Brunswick, Newfoundland and Labrador, Nova Scotia, Quebec
Boreal forests/taiga	Eastern Canadian Shield taiga	Newfoundland and Labrador, Quebec
Boreal forests/taiga	Interior Alaska–Yukon lowland taiga	Yukon
Boreal forests/taiga	Mid-Continental Canadian forests	Alberta, Manitoba, Northwest Territories, Saskatchewan
Boreal forests/taiga	Midwestern Canadian Shield forests	Alberta, Manitoba, Ontario, Saskatchewan
Boreal forests/taiga	Muskwa–Slave Lake forests	Alberta, British Columbia, Northwest Territories
Boreal forests/taiga	Newfoundland Highland forests	Newfoundland and Labrador
Boreal forests/taiga	Northern Canadian Shield taiga	Alberta, Manitoba, Northwest Territories, Nunavut, Saskatchewan
Boreal forests/taiga	Northern Cordillera forests	British Columbia, Northwest Territories, Yukon
Boreal forests/taiga	Northwest Territories taiga	Northwest Territories, Yukon
Boreal forests/taiga	South Avalon–Burin oceanic barrens	Newfoundland and Labrador
Boreal forests/taiga	Southern Hudson Bay taiga	Manitoba, Ontario, Quebec
Boreal forests/taiga	Yukon Interior dry forests	British Columbia, Yukon
Temperate broadleaf and mixed forests	Eastern forest–boreal transition	Ontario, Quebec
Temperate broadleaf and mixed forests	Eastern Great Lakes lowland forests	Ontario, Quebec
Temperate broadleaf and mixed forests	Gulf of St. Lawrence lowland forests	New Brunswick, Nova Scotia, Prince Edward Island, Quebec
Temperate broadleaf and mixed forests	New England–Acadian forests	New Brunswick, Nova Scotia, Quebec
Temperate broadleaf and mixed forests	Southern Great Lakes forests	Ontario
Temperate broadleaf and mixed forests	Western Great Lakes forests	Manitoba, Ontario
Temperate coniferous forests	Alberta Mountain forests	Alberta, British Columbia
Temperate coniferous forests	Alberta–British Columbia foothills forests	Alberta, British Columbia
Temperate coniferous forests	British Columbia mainland coastal forests	British Columbia
Temperate coniferous forests	Cascade Mountains leeward forests	British Columbia
Temperate coniferous forests	Central British Columbia Mountain forests	British Columbia
Temperate coniferous forests	Central Pacific coastal forests	British Columbia
Temperate coniferous forests	Fraser Plateau and Basin complex	British Columbia
Temperate coniferous forests	Haida Gwaii forests	British Columbia
Temperate coniferous forests	North Central Rockies forests	Alberta, British Columbia
Temperate coniferous forests	Northern transitional alpine forests	British Columbia
Temperate coniferous forests	Okanagan dry forests	British Columbia
Temperate coniferous forests	Puget lowland forests	British Columbia
Temperate grasslands, savannas, and shrublands	Canadian aspen forests and parklands	Alberta, British Columbia, Manitoba, Saskatchewan
Temperate grasslands, savannas, and shrublands	Montana valley and foothill grasslands	Alberta
Temperate grasslands, savannas, and shrublands	Northern mixed grasslands	Manitoba, Saskatchewan
Temperate grasslands, savannas, and shrublands	Northern short grasslands	Alberta, Saskatchewan
Temperate grasslands, savannas, and shrublands	Northern tall grasslands	Manitoba
Tundra	Alaska–St. Elias Range tundra	British Columbia, Yukon
Tundra	Arctic coastal tundra	Northwest Territories, Yukon
Tundra	Baffin coastal tundra	Nunavut
Tundra	Brooks–British Range tundra	Northwest Territories, Yukon
Tundra	Davis Highlands tundra	Nunavut
Tundra	High Arctic tundra	Northwest Territories, Nunavut
Tundra	Interior Yukon–Alaska alpine tundra	Yukon
Tundra	Low Arctic tundra	Manitoba, Northwest Territories, Nunavut, Quebec
Tundra	Middle Arctic tundra	Northwest Territories, Nunavut, Quebec
Tundra	Ogilvie–MacKenzie alpine tundra	Northwest Territories, Yukon
Tundra	Pacific Coastal Mountain icefields and tundra	British Columbia, Yukon
Tundra	Torngat Mountain tundra	Newfoundland and Labrador, Quebec

== Marine ecoregions ==
Canada is unique among countries in that it borders three marine realms: the Arctic, Temperate Northern Atlantic, and Temperate Northern Pacific. These realms can be further subdivided into three marine biomes and fifteen marine ecoregions based upon biological distinctiveness.

Quebec is the only province that borders both the Arctic and Temperate Northern Atlantic realms.

Biome	Ecoregion	Province/Territory
Arctic	Baffin Bay-Davis Strait	Nunavut
Arctic	Beaufort - Amundsen - Viscount Melville - Queen Maud	Northwest Territories, Nunavut
Arctic	Beaufort Sea continental coast and shelf	Northwest Territories, Yukon
Arctic	High Arctic Archipelago	Northwest Territories, Nunavut
Arctic	Hudson Complex	Manitoba, Nunavut, Ontario, Quebec
Arctic	Lancaster Sound	Nunavut
Arctic	Northern Grand Banks - Southern Labrador	Newfoundland and Labrador
Arctic	Northern Labrador	Newfoundland and Labrador, Nunavut
Cold temperate northeast Pacific	North American Pacific Fjordland	British Columbia
Cold temperate northeast Pacific	Oregon, Washington, Vancouver coast and shelf	British Columbia
Cold temperate northeast Pacific	Puget Trough/Georgia Basin	British Columbia
Cold temperate northwest Atlantic	Gulf of Maine - Bay of Fundy	New Brunswick, Nova Scotia
Cold temperate northwest Atlantic	Gulf of St. Lawrence - Eastern Scotian Shelf	New Brunswick, Newfoundland and Labrador, Nova Scotia, Prince Edward Island, Quebec
Cold temperate northwest Atlantic	Scotian Shelf	Nova Scotia
Cold temperate northwest Atlantic	Southern Grand Banks - South Newfoundland	Newfoundland and Labrador

== See also ==
- Canadian Arctic tundra
- Forests of Canada
- List of ecoregions in the United States (WWF)
