= Interior Alaska–Yukon lowland taiga =

Taiga ecoregion of Canada and the United States

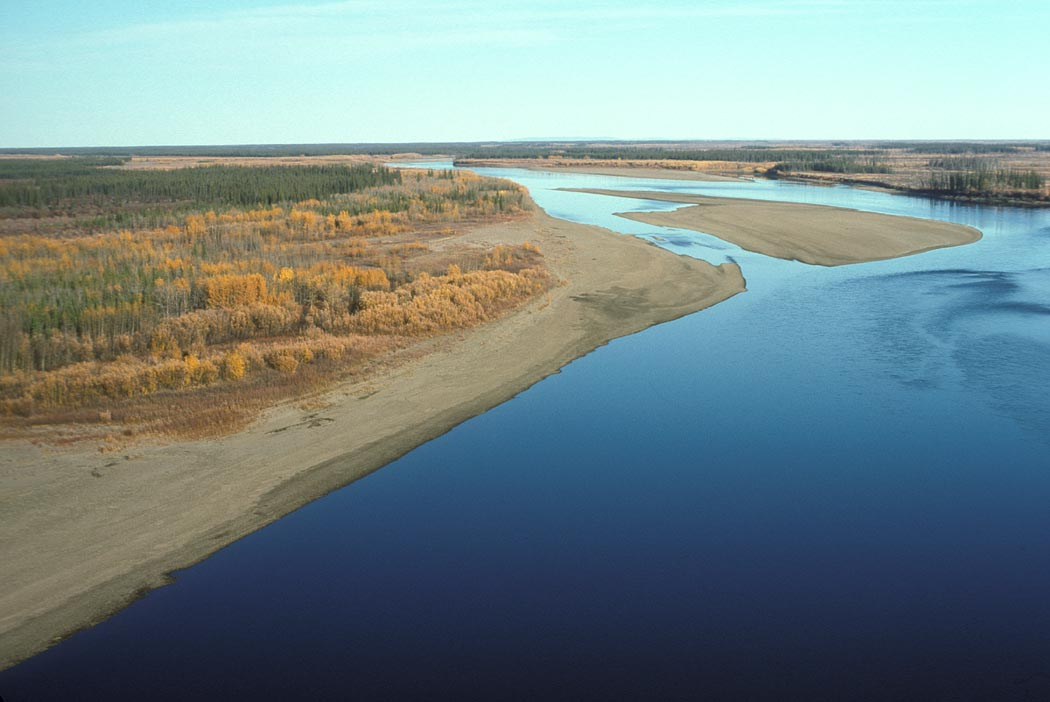
- Lowland taiga at the confluence of the Porcupine and Yukon rivers in Alaska

Ecology
- Realm: Nearctic
- Borders: List: Alaska–St. Elias Range tundra; Arctic foothills tundra; Beringia lowland tundra; Beringia upland tundra; Brooks–British Range tundra; Interior Alaska-Yukon alpine tundra; Northwest Territories taiga; Ogilvie–MacKenzie alpine tundra
- Bird species: 130
- Mammal species: 43

Geography
- Area: 443,406 km^{2} (171,200 mi^{2})
- Countries: United States; Canada
- States: Alaska; Yukon
- Climate type: Subarctic (Dfc)

Conservation
- Conservation status: Relatively Stable/Intact
- Habitat loss: 0%
- Protected: 66.9%

The interior Alaska–Yukon lowland taiga (French: Taïga des basses-terres de l'intérieur de l'Alaska et du Yukon) is an ecoregion in the taiga and boreal forests biome, of far northern North America.

== Setting ==
This is a region of spruce taiga forest covering much of the central and northern interior of the U.S. state of Alaska and Yukon, Canada, from the Bering Sea and Beaufort Sea coasts to the Richardson Mountains in the east with the Brooks Range to the north and the Alaska Range to the south. This is an area of low hills and flatlands from sea level to 600m. In the northeast of the ecoregion lies the Yukon Flats, a vast area of wetlands, forest, bog, and low-lying ground at the confluence of the Yukon River, Porcupine River and Chandalar River, an area which for Arctic North America is particularly rich in wildlife as are the similar Minto Flats also in this ecoregion. The underlying soil of the ecoregion is permafrost and even though the area is close to the sea it has a continental climate with short summers and long, cold winters, especially inland.

== Flora ==
The taiga forests are mainly white spruce (Picea glauca), alaskan birch (Betula neoalaskana), balsam poplar (Populus balsamifera), and quaking aspen (Populus tremuloides) in the warmer drier areas, and black spruce (Picea mariana), and american larch (Larix laricina) where it is marshier but the ecoregion also contains scrubby areas of dwarf birch (Betula nana) and riverbanks of willows, alders, balsam poplars and quaking aspen (Populus tremuloides). Specific habitats include the peat bogs and fens of the Old Crow Flats. Warmer, south-facing valley slopes are home to rare plants that have survived in this harsh climate including Shacklett's cryptantha (Cryptantha shacklettiana), Erysimum asperum and alpine golden buckwheat (Eriogonum flavum).

== Fauna ==
This area is notable for its populations of Porcupine caribou, a subspecies of caribou named for the herd which roams the Porcupine River area and which along with two other large herds, the Central Arctic and the Western Arctic caribou herds, can be found in this ecoregion. Other mammals include large populations of bears, wolves and other predators while birds of the region include rock ptarmigan, lesser scaup, northern pintail, scoters, sandhill crane and American wigeons. Finally the Porcupine River system is an important breeding ground for Chinook salmon.

== Threats and preservation ==
These taiga forests are almost completely intact apart from clearance around the city of Fairbanks, Alaska and some logging in the Tanana Valley State Forest and oil exploration is ongoing in Eagle Plains, Yukon, while the Dempster Highway crosses the region and brings potential poaching of wildlife. The forest is regularly renewed by naturally occurring forest fires. Large areas of the ecoregion are contained within protected areas including Yukon Flats National Wildlife Refuge, Kanuti National Wildlife Refuge, Koyukuk National Wildlife Refuge (in the floodplain of the Koyukuk River), Innoko National Wildlife Refuge, Nowitna National Wildlife Refuge (on the Nowitna River another tributary of the Yukon) and the Arctic National Wildlife Refuge, all in Alaska and established by the Alaska National Interest Lands Conservation Act, and Vuntut National Park in northwestern Yukon Territory, Canada. The Bonnet Plume River and Wind Rivers that flow north into the Peel River are popular destinations for rafting and kayaking and canoeing.

== See also ==
- List of ecoregions in Canada (WWF)
- List of ecoregions in the United States (WWF)
- Interior Alaska Yukon Lowland Taiga One Earth
