= Arctic foothills tundra =

Tundra ecoregion of Alaska, United States

Arctic Foothills Tundra
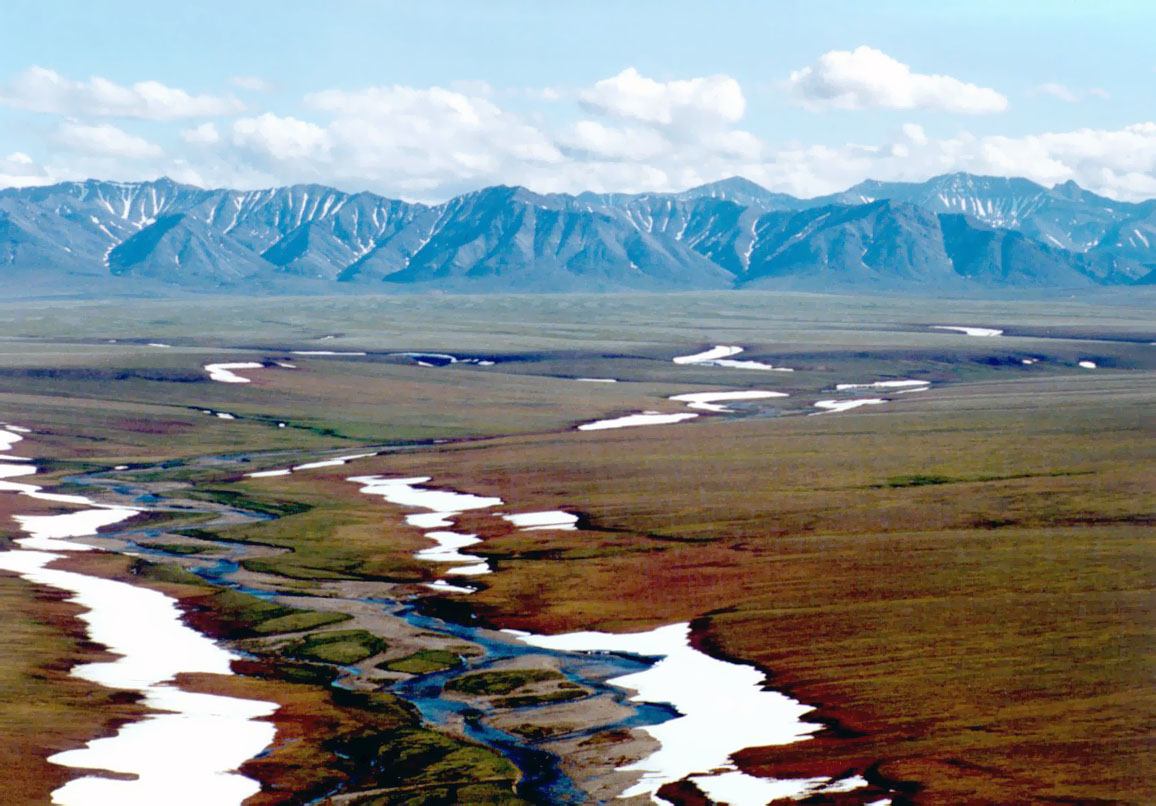
- Arctic National Wildlife Refuge, looking south toward the Brooks Range

- Arctic foothills tundra highlighted in green

Ecology
- Realm: Nearctic
- Biome: Tundra
- Borders: Arctic coastal tundra; Brooks-British Range tundra; Interior Alaska-Yukon lowland taiga; Northwest Territories taiga
- Bird species: 64
- Mammal species: 31

Geography
- Area: 123,512 km^{2} (47,688 mi^{2})
- Country: United States
- State: Alaska
- Rivers: Noatak River, Colville River

Conservation
- Conservation status: Relatively Stable/Intact
- Global 200: Yes
- Habitat loss: 0%
- Protected: 67.8%

The Arctic foothills tundra is an ecoregion of the far north of North America, lying inland from the north coast of Alaska. It is a permafrost tundra with an average annual temperature below freezing.

== Setting ==
This is a hilly area that lies between the boggier Arctic coastal tundra to the north and the Brooks Range to the south, and stretching from the Chukchi Sea east across northern Alaska to the border with Canada's Yukon Territory. The Noatak River valley is the only forested area.

== Flora ==
The main vegetation is the scrubby cottongrass (Eriophorum vaginatum), stiff sedge (Carex bigelowii) and shrubs such as Betula nana, Empetrum nigrum, Rhododendron subarcticum, and the berry Vaccinium vitis-idaea.

== Fauna ==
The Colville River is a migration route for wildlife including moose, and a breeding area for gyrfalcon, peregrine falcon, and rough-legged buzzards. The ecoregion is also home to a number of waterbirds. Mammals include the large ungulates Alaska moose (Alces alces gigas) and Porcupine caribou (Rangifer tarandus arcticus), the predators grizzly bear (Ursus arctos horribilis) and Alaskan Tundra wolf (Canis lupus tundrarum) breed here, while smaller mammals include Alaskan hare (Lepus othus) and Arctic ground squirrel (Spermophilus parryi).

== Threats and preservation ==
This ecoregion is unspoilt except that it is crossed by the Dalton Highway and the Trans-Alaska Pipeline, which can disrupt migratory behaviour of some wildlife. The east end of the ecoregion is part of the Arctic National Wildlife Refuge.

== See also ==
- List of ecoregions in the United States (WWF)
