= The Last Alaskans =

American reality television series (2015–2019)

- Genre: Reality
- Country of origin: United States
- Original language: English
- No. of seasons: 4
- No. of episodes: 36

Production
- Running time: 42 minutes
- Production company: Half Yard Productions

Original release
- Network: Animal Planet (season 1); Discovery Channel (seasons 2–4)
- Release: May 25, 2015 – January 27, 2019

The Last Alaskans is an American reality television series that premiered on Animal Planet on May 25, 2015. The second season premiered on the Discovery Channel on April 12, 2016. The fourth and final season premiered on the Discovery Channel on November 25, 2018. The series follows several families and trappers as they survive each winter season off-grid, in the Arctic National Wildlife Refuge in Alaska.

== Series overview ==
Season	Episodes	Originally released		
Season	Episodes	First released	Last released	Network
1	8	May 25, 2015	July 12, 2015	Animal Planet
2	8	April 12, 2016	May 31, 2016	Discovery Channel
3	10	March 22, 2017	May 17, 2017	Discovery Channel
4	10	November 25, 2018	January 27, 2019	Discovery Channel

== Episodes ==
=== Season 1 (2015) ===
No. overall	No. in season	Title	Original release date	US viewers (millions)
1	1	"No Man's Land"	May 25, 2015	0.862
2	2	"The Hunted"	May 31, 2015	1.578
3	3	"Winter Is Coming"	June 7, 2015	1.596
4	4	"Everything is Hungry"	June 14, 2015	1.582
5	5	"The Last Sunset"	June 21, 2015	N/A
6	6	"Into the Darkness"	June 28, 2015	N/A
7	7	"Nothing Lasts Forever"	July 5, 2015	N/A
8	8	"The End of Darkness"	July 12, 2015	N/A

=== Season 2 (2016) ===
No. overall	No. in season	Title	Original release date	US viewers (millions)
9	1	"Home Again"	April 12, 2016	N/A
10	2	"Only The Strong"	April 19, 2016	N/A
11	3	"Survival Mode"	April 26, 2016	N/A
12	4	"Alone"	May 3, 2016	N/A
13	5	"Winter's Edge"	May 10, 2016	N/A
14	6	"On Thin Ice"	May 17, 2016	N/A
15	7	"Dark Winter"	May 24, 2016	N/A
16	8	"Fire and Ice"	May 31, 2016	N/A

=== Season 3 (2017) ===
No. overall	No. in season	Title	Original release date	US viewers (millions)
17	1	"Winter's Dawn"	March 22, 2017	1.46
18	2	"A Taste of Freedom"	March 29, 2017	1.30
19	3	"Legacy in Danger"	April 5, 2017	1.42
20	4	"Bear Intruder"	April 12, 2017	1.63
21	5	"Killer Instinct"	April 19, 2017	1.59
22	6	"Spirit of the Hunter"	April 26, 2017	1.54
23	7	"Pray for Snow"	May 3, 2017	1.39
24	8	"Race Against the Sun"	May 10, 2017	1.41
25	9	"The Great Unknown"	May 17, 2017	1.33
26	10	"Circle of Life"	May 17, 2017	1.33

=== Season 4 (2018) ===
No. overall	No. in season	Title	Original release date	US viewers (millions)
27	1	"Hit the Ground Hunting"	November 25, 2018	1.166
28	2	"The Price of Freedom"	December 2, 2018	1.329
29	3	"Two Kills"	December 9, 2018	1.355
30	4	"No Regrets"	December 16, 2018	1.344
31	5	"The Hunter is Hunted"	December 23, 2018	1.386
32	6	"Winter's Warth"	December 30, 2018	1.352
33	7	"Hard Choices"	January 6, 2019	1.609
34	8	"Never Gets Easier"	January 13, 2019	1.558
35	9	"Biting Back"	January 20, 2019	1.432
36	10	"Laying Down Their Legacy"	January 27, 2019	1.494
