= Low Arctic tundra =

Tundra ecoregion of Canada

Canadian Low Arctic tundra
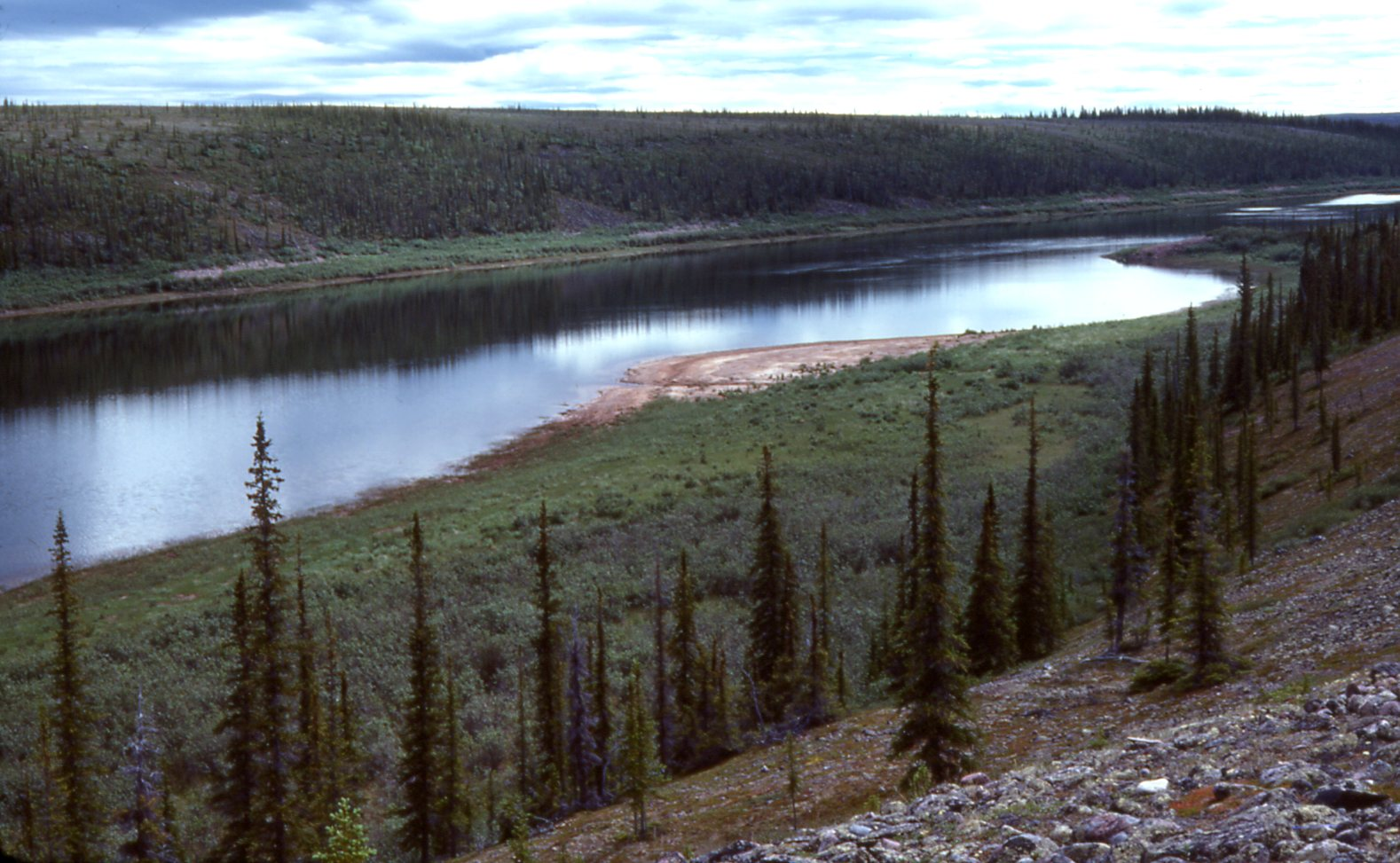
- Thelon Wildlife Sanctuary

- Ecoregion territory (in green)

Ecology
- Realm: Nearctic
- Biome: Tundra
- Borders: List: Arctic coastal tundra; Eastern Canadian Shield taiga; Middle Arctic tundra; Northern Canadian Shield taiga; Northwest Territories taiga; Southern Hudson Bay taiga

Geography
- Area: 798,399 km^{2} (308,264 mi^{2})
- Country: Canada
- Province/Territory: Manitoba; Northwest Territories; Nunavut; Quebec
- Coordinates: 66.25°N 102.25°W
- Climate type: Polar and subarctic

The Canadian Low Arctic Tundra ecoregion covers a rolling landscape of shrubby tundra vegetation along the northern edge of the mainland Canada along the border of the Northwest Territories and Nunavut, and a small portion in Quebec on the northeast coast of Hudson Bay. The region is important for large herds of caribou and other large mammals, and for large nesting colonies of birds such as snow geese. The region is mostly intact, with 95% remaining intact.

== Location and description ==
The ecoregions stretch for 3,100 kilometres (1,900 mi) across the northern tier of mainland Canada. The northwestern end is at the Mackenzie River Delta, stretching east across the plains north of Great Bear Lake, the Nunavut mainland, Southampton Island, the Ottawa Islands, and a portion of northern Quebec. Mean elevation is 229 metres (751 ft), with a high point of 854 metres (2,802 ft).

Most of the terrain is flat or rolling lowlands on thin soil over the Precambrian granite bedrock, with many outcrops. A notable feature of the region is long, winding eskers of glacial gravel, some reaching 100 km in length. Permafrost is continuous, except for some areas of discontinuous permafrost in the Ottawa Islands.

== Climate ==
The climate of the ecoregion is Subarctic climate, without dry season (Köppen climate classification Subarctic climate (Dfc)). This climate is characterized by mild summers (only 1–3 months above 10 °C (50.0 °F)) and cold, snowy winters (coldest month below −3 °C (26.6 °F)). Average precipitation ranges from 200 mm/year in the northwest to 500 mm/year in Quebec.

== Flora and fauna ==
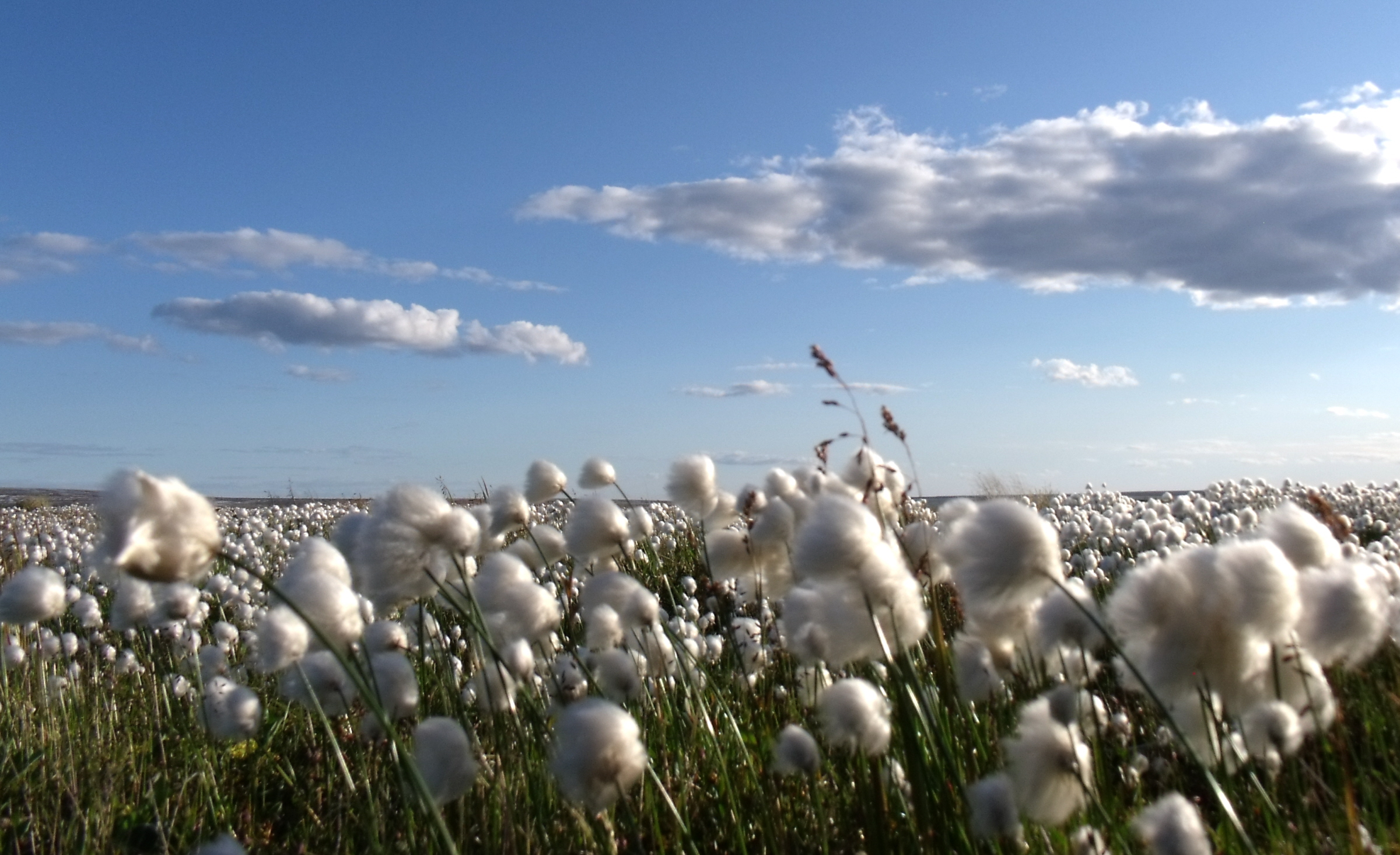
Lush expanse of cottongrass near Arviat, Nunavut.

The ecoregion is a transition zone between the taiga forests to the south, and the treeless arctic tundra to the north. 50% of the territory is herbaceous cover, 18% moss and lichen, 6% shrubs, and about 1% tree cover in protected areas and along river courses. The region can support limited subalpine forests of black spruce (Picea mariana, tamarack (Larix laricina), white spruce (Picea glauca), dwarf birch (Betula nana), and willow (Salix spp.) There are extensive wetlands in the low areas.

Many mammal species are adapted to live in this environment. In the west there are herds of barren-ground caribou (Rangifer tarandus ssp. arcticus), with collective total 1.5 million individuals. Woodland caribou are found in the east. Other notable mammals include polar bears (Ursus maritimus) on the coasts, grizzly bears (Ursus arctos) and black bear (Ursus americanus) in Quebec, and wolf (Canis lupus), moose (Alces alces), Arctic ground squirrel (Urocitellus parryii), and brown lemming (Lemmus sibiricus).

The region is important for large nesting colonies of snow geese (Anser caerulescens), Ross's goose (Anser rossii) and many other migratory birds.

== Protected areas ==
Over 17% of the ecoregion is officially protected. These protected areas include:

- Queen Maud Gulf Migratory Bird Sanctuary
- Qaqsauqtuuq Migratory Bird Sanctuary
- Ikkattuaq Migratory Bird Sanctuary
- Thelon Wildlife Sanctuary
- Tuktut Nogait National Park

== See also ==
- List of ecoregions in Canada (WWF)
