= Northwest Territories taiga =

Taiga ecoregion located in the Northwest Territories and Yukon provinces of Canada

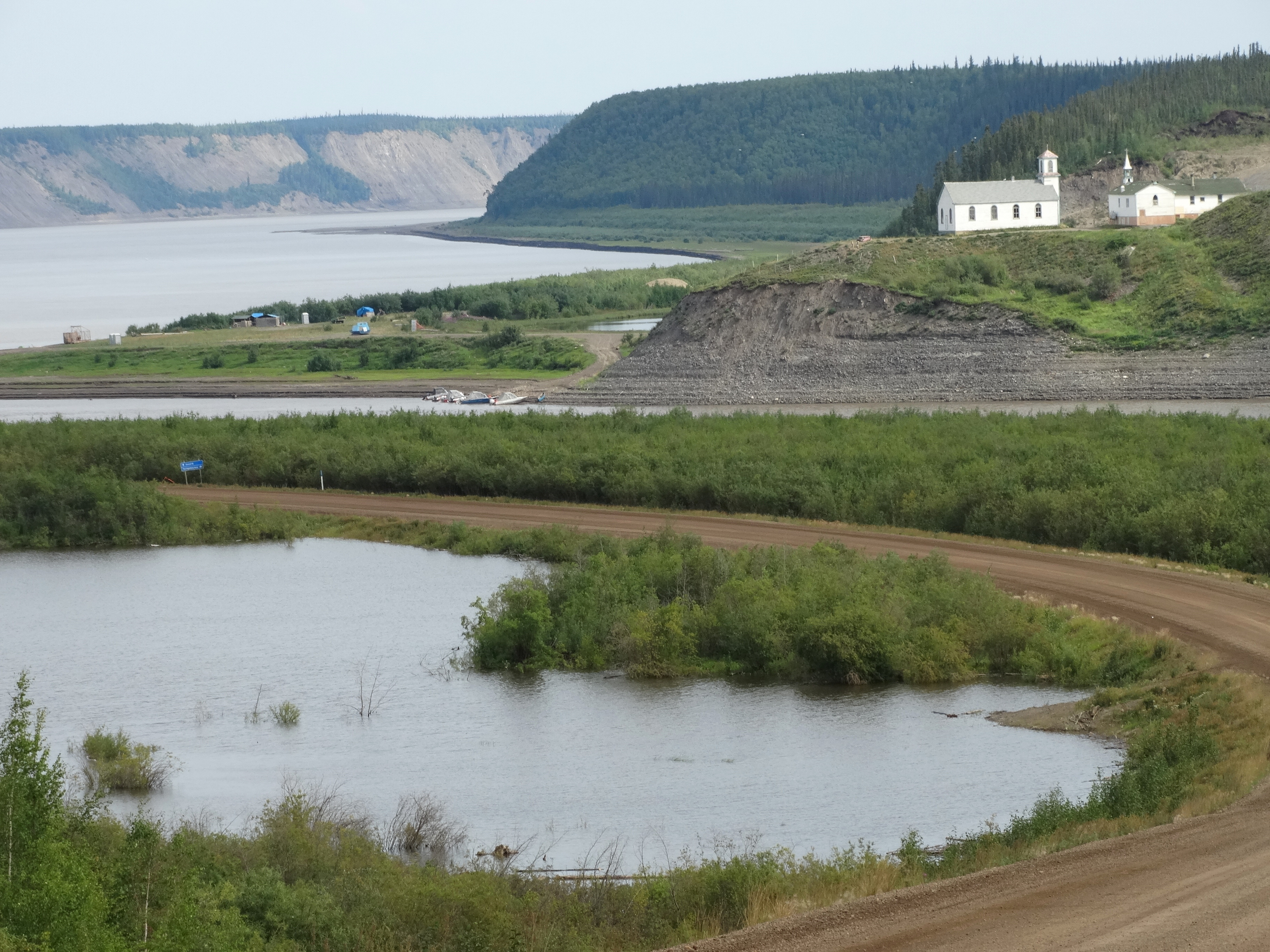
- Mackenzie River near Inuvik

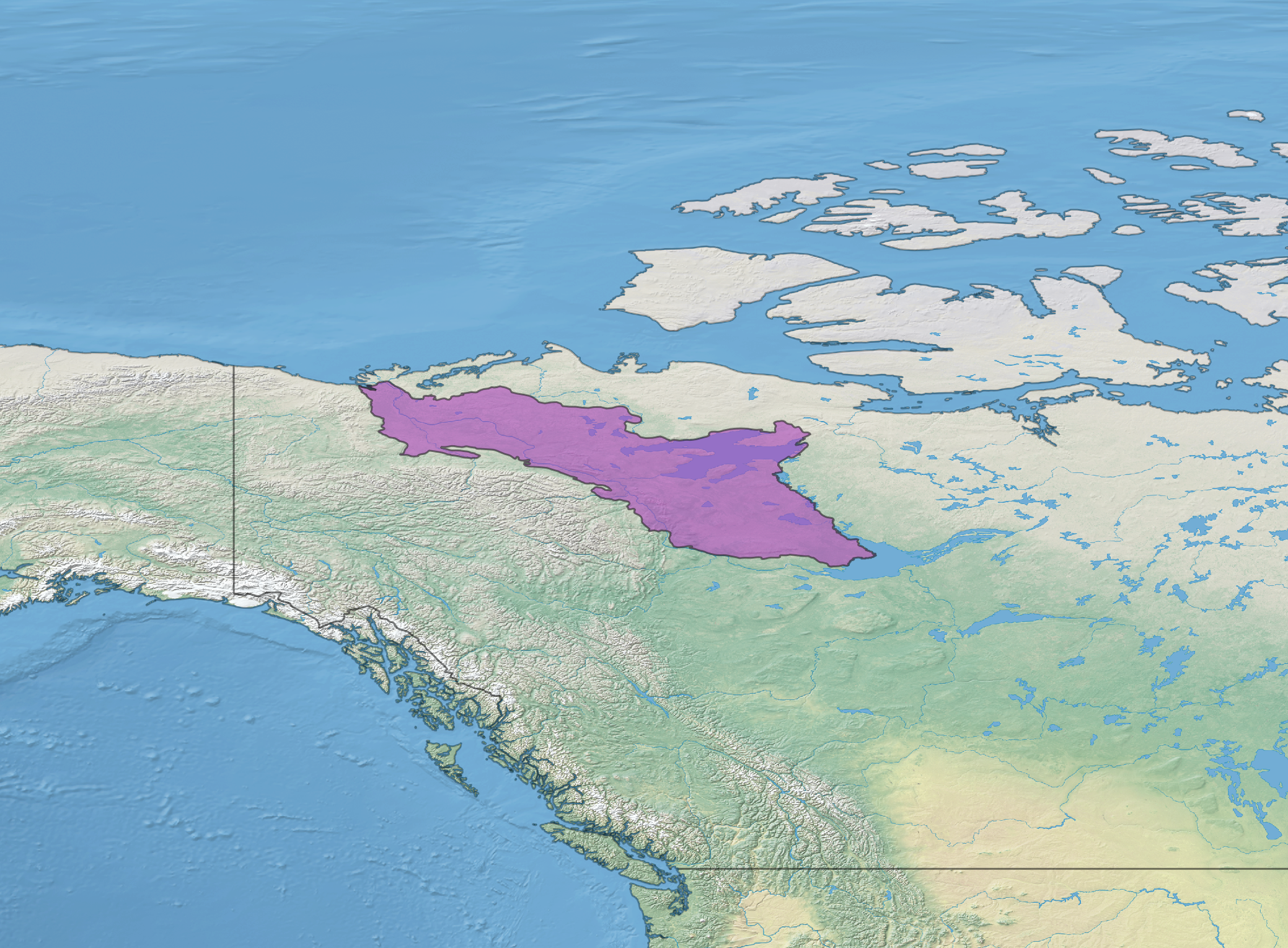
- Map of the Northwest Territories Taiga (purple)

Ecology
- Realm: Nearctic
- Biome: Boreal forests/taiga
- Borders: List: Arctic coastal tundra; Arctic foothills tundra; Brooks-British Range tundra; Interior Alaska-Yukon lowland taiga; Low Arctic tundra; Muskwa-Slave Lake forests; Northern Canadian Shield taiga; Northern Cordillera forests; Ogilvie-MacKenzie alpine tundra
- Bird species: 131
- Mammal species: 48

Geography
- Area: 345,763 km^{2} (133,500 sq mi)
- Country: Canada
- Territories: Northwest Territories and Yukon
- Coordinates: 65.75°N 124.75°W
- Climate type: Subarctic (Dfc)

Conservation
- Conservation status: Relatively Stable/Intact
- Habitat loss: 0%
- Protected: 4.25%

The Northwest Territories taiga ecoregion (WWF:NA0614) is located in the Northwest Territories and Yukon provinces of Canada. It covers forest and tundra along the Mackenzie River Valley and the surrounding highlands in the southern portion of the valley.

== Location and description ==
The ecoregion stretches 1,200 km from the Great Slave Lake in the south to the mouth of the Mackenzie River at the Arctic Ocean in the north. The river valley is one of broad lowlands, with plateaus on the edges and highlands in the southwest. The median elevation is 348 metres (1,142 ft), and the highest point is 2,208 metres (7,244 ft).

== Climate ==
The climate of the ecoregion is Subarctic climate, without dry season (Köppen climate classification Subarctic climate (Dfc)). This climate is characterized by mild summers (only 1–3 months above 10 °C (50.0 °F)) and cold, snowy winters (coldest month below −3 °C (26.6 °F)). Annual precipitation averages 200–400 mm/year across most of the region, reaching 500 mm/year in the south.

== Flora and fauna ==
About half of the region is forested, split evenly between closed canopy and open forest. Characteristic trees are black spruce (Picea mariana), with shrubs of dwarf birch (Betula nana), Labrador tea (Ledum decumbens), and willow (Salix). Higher elevations support mixed forests of white and black spruce (Picea glauca), jack pine (Pinus banksiana), lodgepole pine (Pinus contorta), tamarack (Larix laricina), quaking aspen (Populus tremuloides), and balsam poplar (Populus balsamifera). Another 33% of the region is covered in shrubs or herbaceous cover; much of this terrain is low-lying wetlands. The remainder is water or sparse vegetation.

Mammals of the area include woodland caribou (Rangifer tarandus), moose (Alces alces), bison (Bison bison), wolf (Canis lupus), black bear (Ursus americanus), marten (Martes americana), lynx (Lynx canadensis), and Arctic ground squirrel (Urocitellus parryii).

== Protected areas ==
About 10% of the region is officially protected, including:

- Nahanni National Park Reserve, protecting a portion of the South Nahanni River and the Mackenzie Mountains
- Edéhzhíe Protected Area
- Ts’udé Nilįné Tuyeta Territorial Protected Area

== See also ==
- List of ecoregions in Canada (WWF)
- Northwest Territories Taiga One Earth
