= Muskwa–Slave Lake Taiga =

Taiga ecoregion of northwestern Canada

Muskwa-Slave Lake Taiga
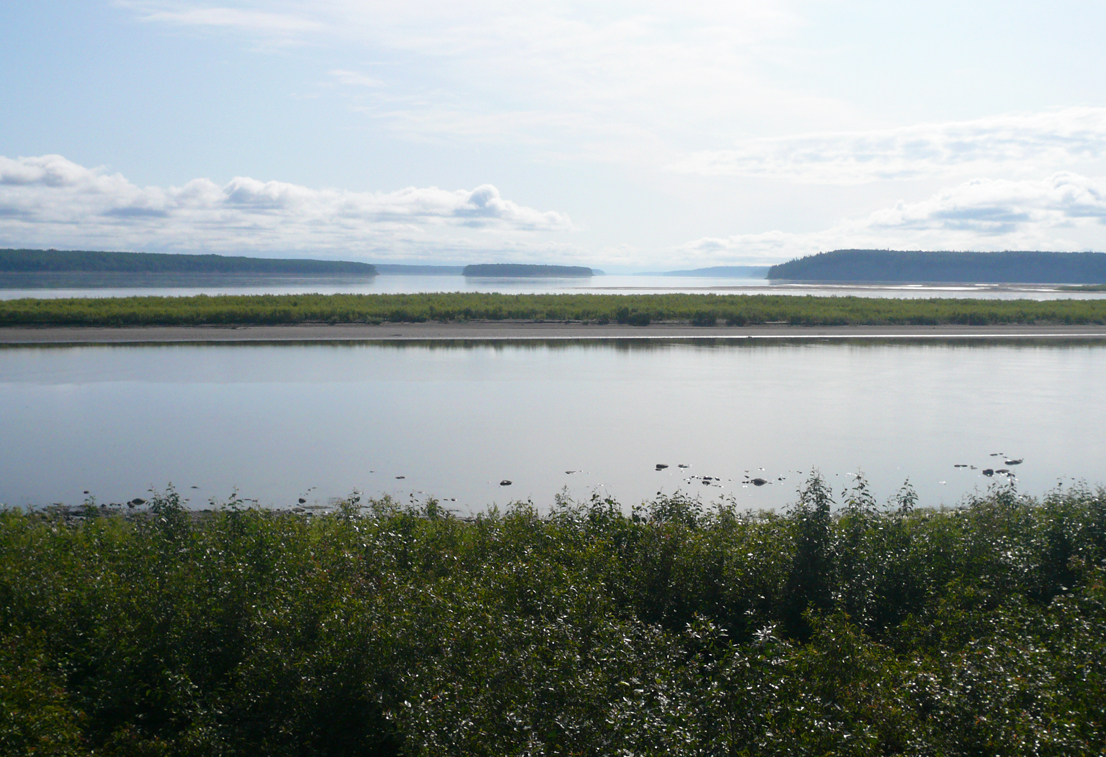
- Confluence of Liard and Mackenzie rivers

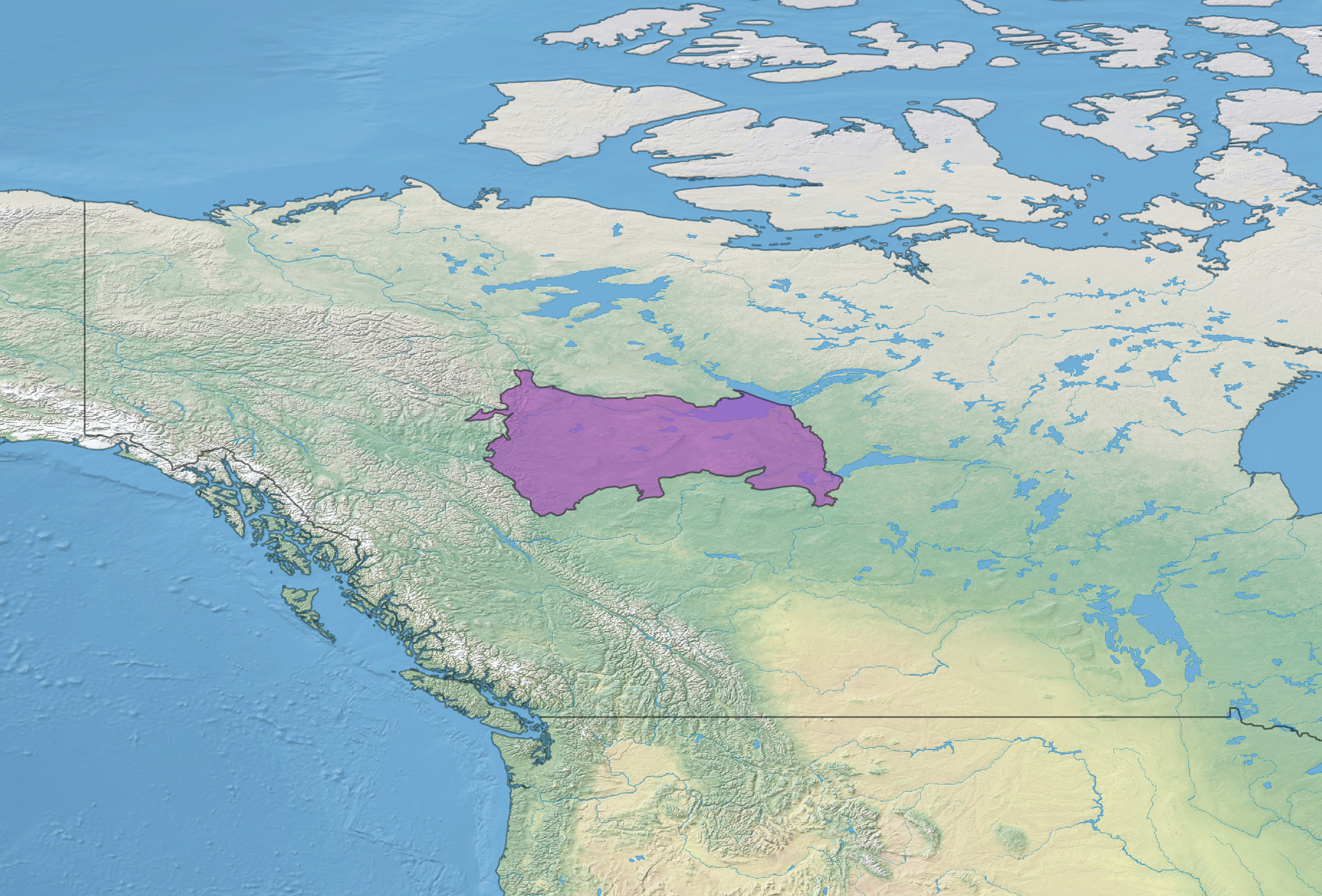
- Map of the Muskwa-Slave Lake Taiga (purple)

Ecology
- Realm: Nearctic realm
- Biome: Boreal forests/taiga
- Borders: List: Alberta-British Columbia foothills forests; Canadian aspen forests and parklands; Mid-Continental Canadian forests; Northern Cordillera forests; Northwest Territories taiga
- Bird species: 158
- Mammal species: 50

Geography
- Area: 297,920 km^{2} (115,030 mi^{2})
- Countries: Canada
- Coordinates: 60°20′N 118.30°0′W
- Climate type: Subarctic (Dfc)

Conservation
- Conservation status: Relatively Stable/Intact
- Global 200: Yes
- Habitat loss: 0%
- Protected: 7%

The Muskwa-Slave Lake Taiga ecoregion covers Canadian taiga in northwestern Alberta, northeastern British Columbia and a large portion of the southwestern Northwest Territories around the Mackenzie River valley and the Great Slave Lake.

== Setting ==
The ecoregion's specific areas include the boreal forest to the east of the MacKenzie (between Mackenzie and Franklin Mountains); the land along the Horn River west to the Mackenzie; the Liard River basin; and the Caribou Mountains in north-central Alberta.

The landscape consists of wide, flat plains and lowlands broken by low mountains and plateaus, such as the Caribou Mountains. Almost half of the area is covered in wetlands and bogs such as Zama Lake in Alberta. The ecoregion is in the zone of discontinuous permafrost and has a subarctic climate, with summer temperatures averaging around 12.5 °C (54.5 °F), and winter temperatures averaging from −18 °C (0 °F) to −24.5 °C (−12.1 °F). Annual average temperatures are between −2.0 °C (28.4 °F) and −6.5 °C (20.3 °F). Precipitation is moderately low, averaging between 250 millimetres (9.8 in) and 500 millimetres (20 in).

== Flora ==
Vegetation consists mainly of dense forests of trembling aspen (Populus tremuloides), white spruce (Picea glauca) and balsam fir (Abies balsamea), with smaller populations of balsam poplar (Populus balsamifera), black spruce (Picea mariana) and paper birch.

== Fauna ==
This ecoregion is rich in wildlife including large herds (numbering in the thousands) of Migratory Woodland Caribou (Rangifer tarandus caribou) and other large mammals such as moose (Alces alces), Wood Bison (Bison bison athabascae) (Wood Buffalo National Park is in this region), elk (Cervus canadensis) and mule deer (Odocoileus hemonius) along with smaller animals such as snowshoe hare (Lepus americanus).

The predators that feed on all this wildlife include Canada Lynx (Lynx canadensis), grizzly bear (Ursos arctos horriblus), American black bear (Ursus americanus), red fox (Vulpes vulpes), and gray wolf (Canis lupus). Birds include the waterfowl of the many wetlands along with prairie birds such as grouse.

== Threats and preservation ==
This ecoregion is well preserved, with an estimated 75% intact. Protected areas include western parts of Wood Buffalo National Park in Northern Alberta the south-central Northwest Territories, and Maxhamish Lake Provincial Park and Protected Area in northeastern British Columbia. Logging is the greatest threat to the region's ecological integrity along with potential for mining, the effect of the Mackenzie Highway and oil pipelines.

== See also ==
- List of ecoregions in Canada (WWF)
