= Middle Arctic tundra =

Tundra ecoregion of Canada

Canadian Middle Arctic Tundra
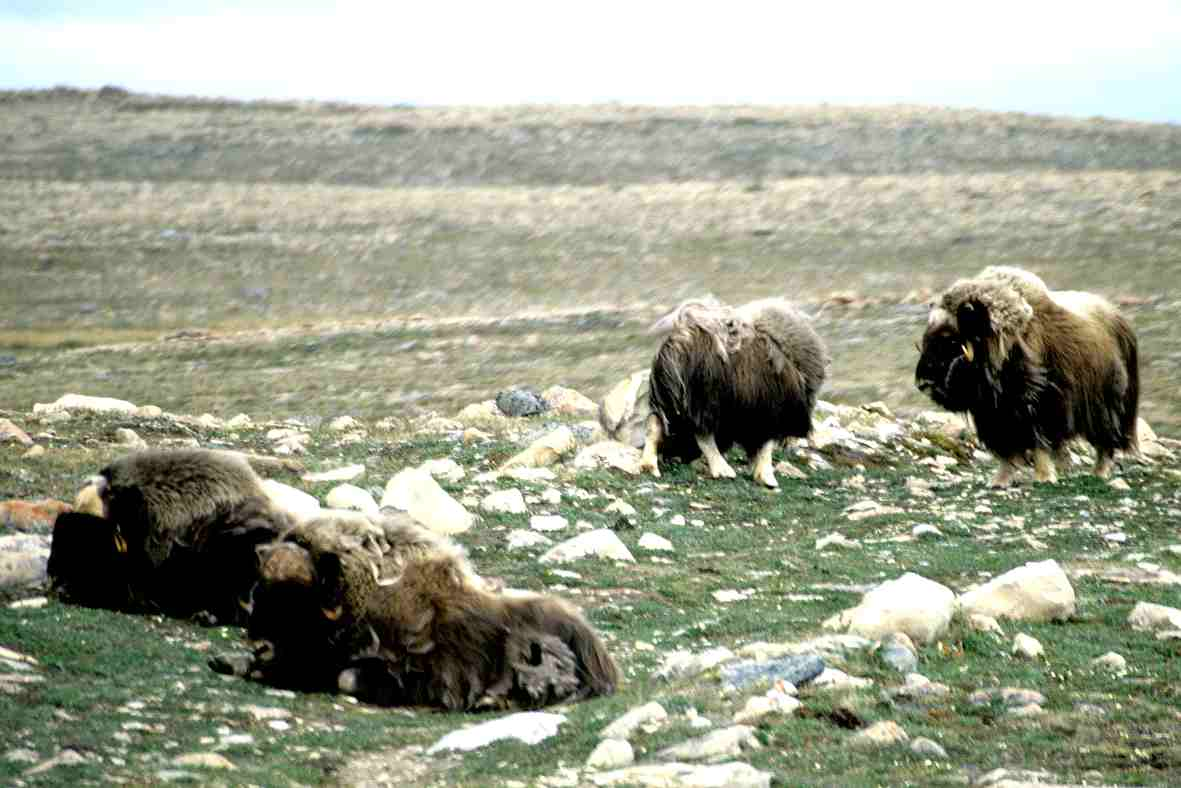
- Muskoxen on Victoria Island (Canada)

- Ecoregion territory (in green)

Ecology
- Realm: Nearctic
- Biome: Tundra
- Borders: Arctic coastal tundra; Davis Highlands tundra; High Arctic tundra; Low Arctic tundra

Geography
- Area: 1,034,340 km^{2} (399,360 mi^{2})
- Country: Canada
- Province/Territory: Northwest Territories; Nunavut; Quebec
- Coordinates: 67.25°N 91.75°W
- Climate type: Polar

The Canadian Middle Arctic Tundra ecoregion covers a broad stretch of northern Canada - the southern islands of the Arctic Archipelago, plus the northern mainland of Nunavut and, across Hudson Bay to the east, a portion of northern Quebec. This is the coldest and driest ecoregion in Canada, and can be referred to as a 'polar desert'. It is an important region for breeding and migratory birds, and supports 80% of the world's muskox.

== Location and description ==
The ecoregion stretches over 2,500 kilometres (1,600 mi) from west to east: Banks Island, Victoria Island, King William Island, northeast Nunavut, and the southern portions of Prince of Wales Island and Baffin Island. Most of the territory rolling lowlands (mean elevation is 176 metres (577 ft)).

The ecoregion to the north is the 'High Arctic tundra' (colder and wetter), to the south is the Low Arctic tundra (warmer and wetter). The bedrock under the western extent is Paleozoic and Mesozoic sedimentary rock with a relatively flat cover of glacial moraines and marine deposits. The eastern bedrock is older Precambrian granite, with rockier topography. Permafrost is continuous under the whole region, with depths up to hundreds of meters. The northern islands are surrounded by pack ice most of the year.

== Climate ==
The climate of the ecoregion is Tundra climate (Köppen climate classification ET), a local climate in which at least one month has an average temperature high enough to melt snow (0 °C (32 °F)), but no month with an average temperature in excess of 10 °C (50 °F). In this ecoregion, the mean summer month temperature ranges from 0.5 °C (32.9 °F) in the north to 4.5 °C (40.1 °F) in the south. Average annual precipitation is low, from 100–200 mm/year. Snow covers the ground for 10 months each year.

== Flora and fauna ==
The Middle Arctic Tundra is north of the treeline. 56% of the ground cover is moss and lichen, 30% is low herbaceous vegetation tolerant of the cold and dry environment, 1% is herbaceous wetlands, and up to 1% supports shrubs in protected areas. Because of the harsh conditions—the cold, aridity, wind and poor, thin soils—vegetation is sparse and stunted. The rare protected area for shrubs is characterized by arctic willow (Salix arctica) and dwarf birch (Betula) and alder (Alnus); the herb cover by Saxifraga species and Dryas).

Characteristic mammals include barren-ground caribou (Rangifer tarandus ssp. arcticus), muskox (Ovibos moschatus), arctic wolf (Canis lupus arctos), arctic fox (Alopex lagopus), polar bear (Ursus maritimus), arctic hare (Lepus arcticus), brown lemming (Lemmus sibiricus) and collared lemming (Dicrostonyx groenlandicus). The region supports up to 80% of the world's musk ox (Ovibos moschatus).

The region supports important breeding and migratory grounds for birds, including snow goose (Chen caerulescens), brant (Branta bernicla), Canada goose (Branta canadensis), eider (Somateria spp.) and oldsquaw duck (Clangula hyemalis).

== Protected areas ==
Over 5% of the ecoregion is officially protected. These protected areas include:

- Aulavik National Park
- Qaqsauqtuuq Migratory Bird Sanctuary
- Auyuittuq National Park
- Katannilik Territorial Park Reserve

== See also ==
- List of ecoregions in Canada (WWF)
