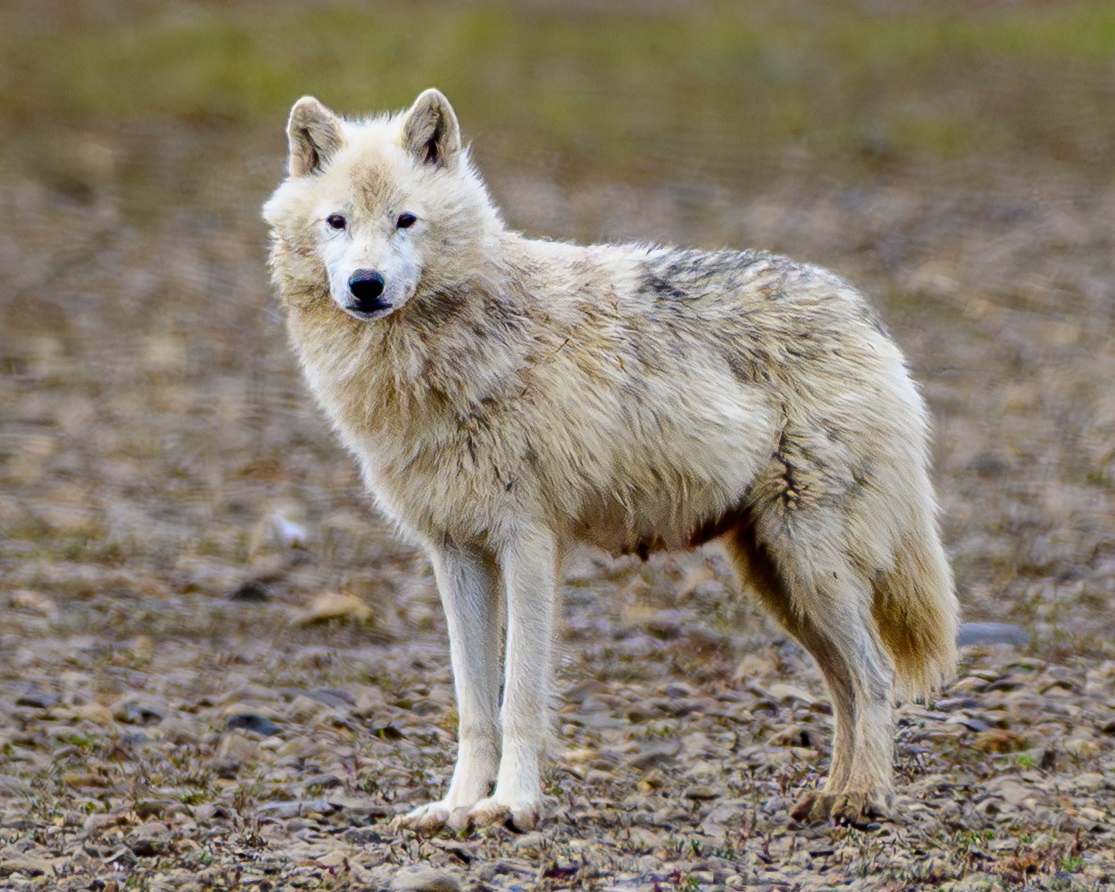
- Female arctic wolf in Aulavik National Park, Banks Island, NWT

Conservation status
- Data Deficient (COSEWIC)

Scientific classification
- Kingdom: Animalia
- Phylum: Chordata
- Class: Mammalia
- Order: Carnivora
- Family: Canidae
- Genus: Canis
- Species: C. lupus
- Subspecies: C. l. arctos

Trinomial name
- Canis lupus arctos Pocock, 1935
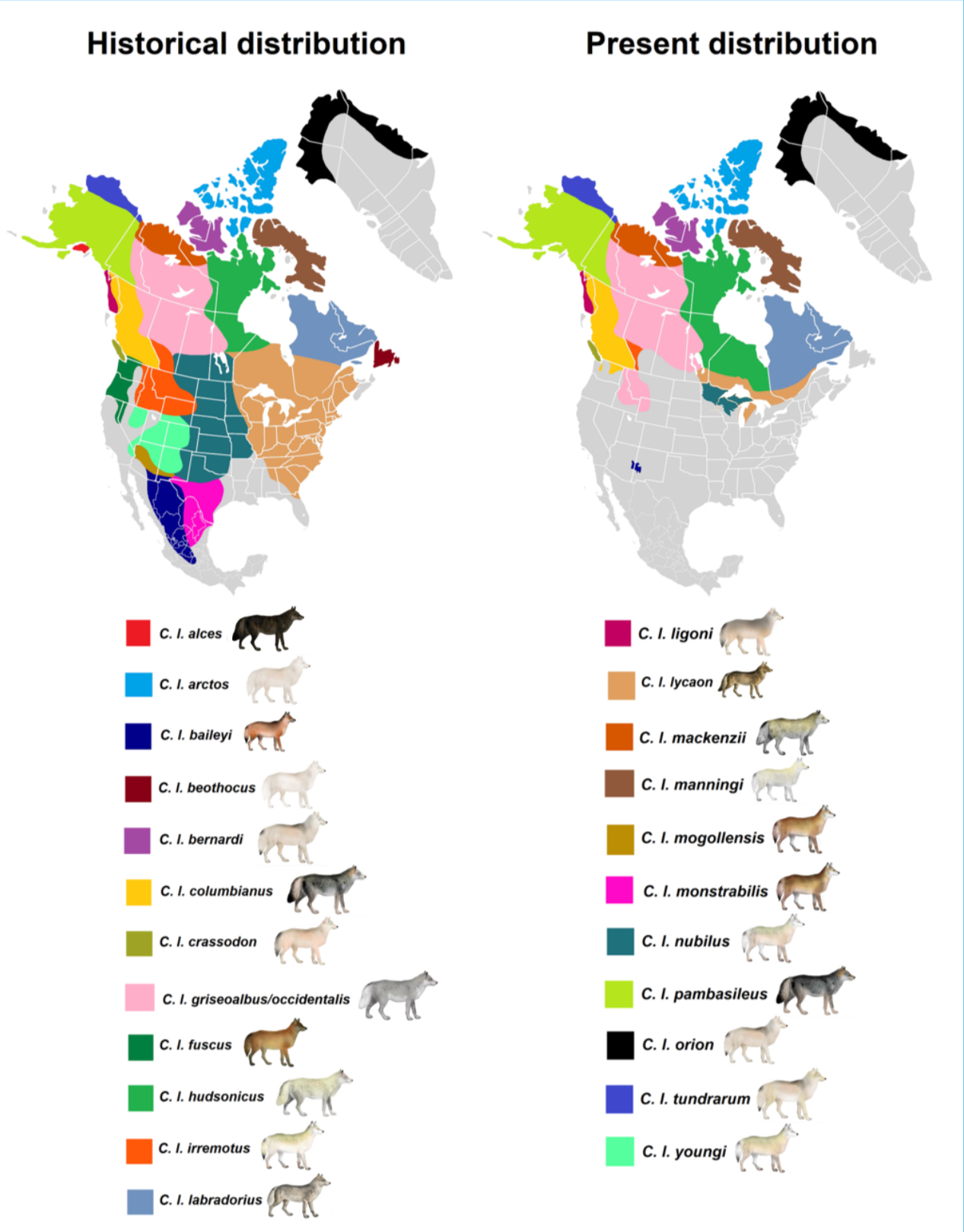
- Historical and present range of grey wolf subspecies in North America

= Arctic wolf =

Subspecies of carnivore

The Arctic wolf (Canis lupus arctos), also known as the white wolf, polar wolf, and the Arctic grey wolf, is a subspecies of grey wolf native to the High Arctic tundra of Canada's Queen Elizabeth Islands, from Melville Island to Ellesmere Island. Unlike some populations that move between tundra and forest regions, Arctic wolves spend their entire lives north of the northern treeline. Their southward distribution is limited to the northern fringes of the Middle Arctic tundra on the southern half of Prince of Wales and Somerset Islands.

It is a medium-sized subspecies, distinguished from the northwestern wolf by its smaller size, whiter colouration, narrower braincase, and larger carnassials. Since 1930, there has been a progressive reduction in size in Arctic wolf skulls, which is likely the result of wolf-dog hybridization.

== Taxonomy ==
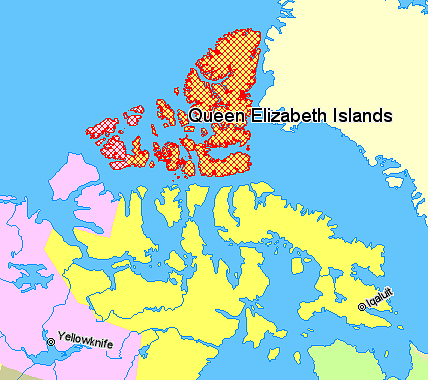
Queen Elizabeth Islands, northern Canada

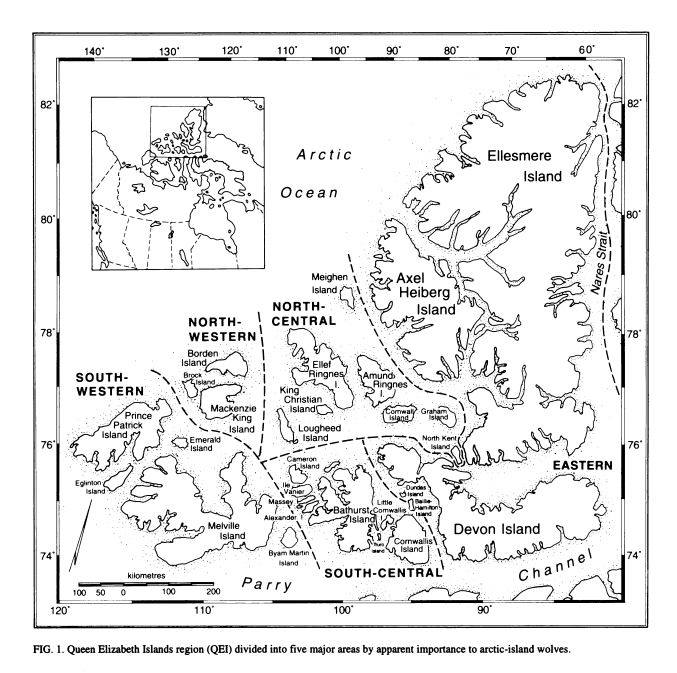
Queen Elizabeth Islands region (QEI) divided into five major areas by apparent importance to arctic-island wolves.

In 1935, the British zoologist Reginald Pocock attributed the subspecies name Canis lupus arctos (Arctic wolf) to a specimen from Melville Island in the Queen Elizabeth Islands, Canada. He wrote that similar wolves could be found on Ellesmere Island. He also attributed the name Canis lupus orion to a Greenland wolf specimen from Cape York, northwest Greenland. Both wolves are recognized as separate subspecies of Canis lupus in the taxonomic authority Mammal Species of the World (2005).

A study by Chambers et al. (2012) using autosomal microsatellite DNA and Mitochondrial DNA data indicate that the Arctic wolf has no unique haplotypes which suggests that its colonization of the Arctic Archipelago from the North American mainland was relatively recent, and thus not sufficient to warrant subspecies status. During a meeting assembled in 2014 by the National Center for Ecological Analysis and Synthesis of the United States Fish and Wildlife Service, one speaker, Robert K. Wayne, mentioned he disagreed with the conclusion that a subspecies had to be genetically distinct, believing that different subspecies could slowly grade into each other - suggesting that although it was impossible to determine if an individual wolf was one subspecies or the next using DNA, the population of Arctic wolves as a whole could be distinguished by the looking at the proportions of single-nucleotide polymorphisms (SNP): i.e. Arctic wolves could be distinguished by having three wolves in the putative population with a specific SNP, whereas another subspecies could be distinguished by having 20 wolves with that SNP. Wayne furthermore stated that he believed the habitat in which the wolf happened to be found was a good enough characteristic to distinguish a subspecies.

== Behaviour ==
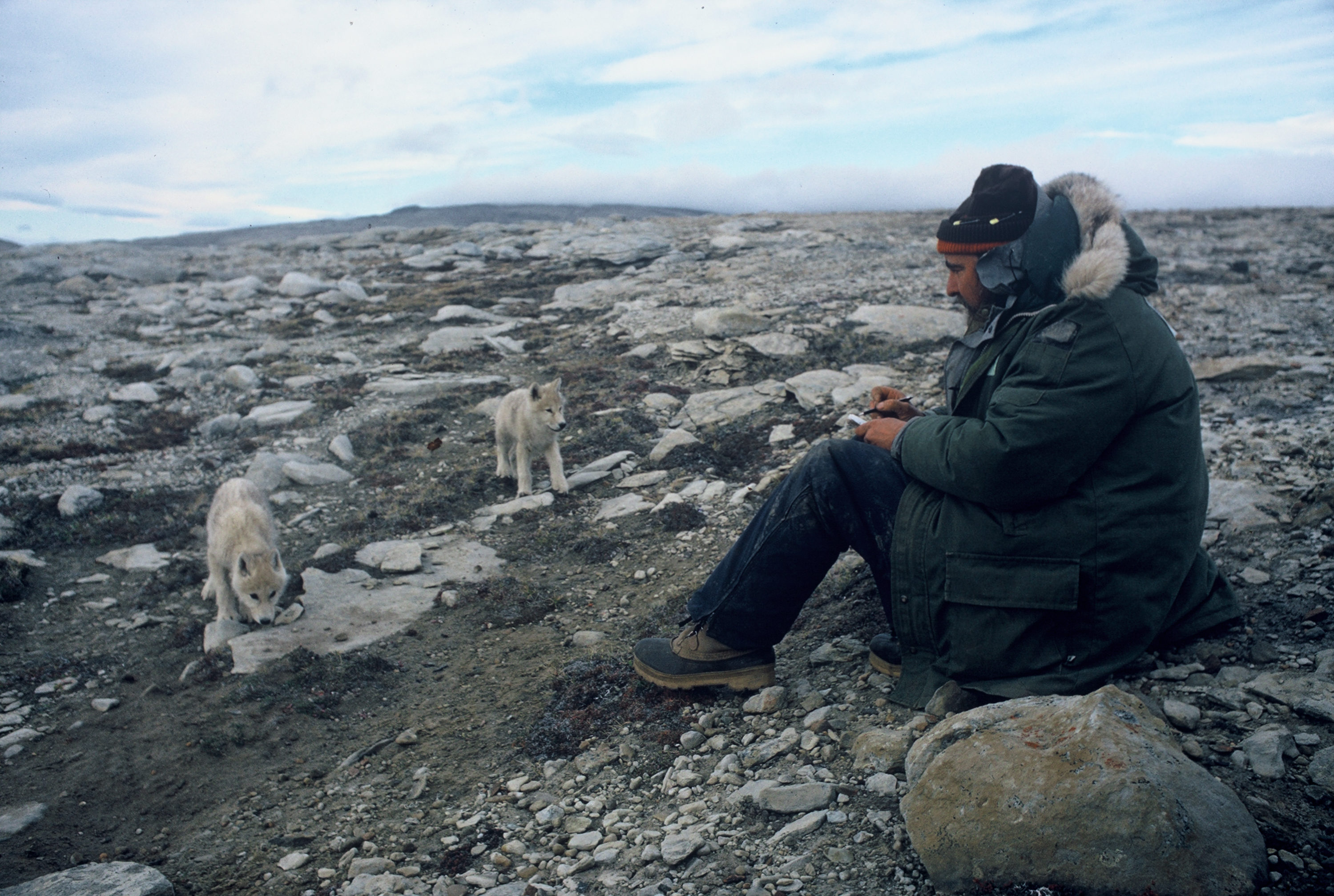
Two Arctic wolf pups approaching biologist L. David Mech in Ellesmere Island

The Arctic wolf is relatively unafraid of people, and can be coaxed to approach people in some areas. The wolves on Ellesmere Island do not fear humans, which is thought to be due to them seeing humans so little, and they will approach humans cautiously and curiously. Otto Sverdrup wrote that during the Fram expedition, a pair of wolves shadowed one of his teammates, who kept them at a distance by waving his ski pole. In 1977, a pair of scientists were approached by six wolves on Ellesmere Island, with one animal leaping at one of the scientists and grazing a cheek. A number of incidents involving aggressive wolves have occurred in Alert, Nunavut, where the wolves have lived in close proximity to the local weather station for decades and became habituated to humans. One of these wolves attacked 3 people, was shot, and tested positive for rabies. Very little is known about the movement of the Arctic wolves, mainly due to climate. The only time at which the wolf migrates is during the wintertime when there is complete darkness for 24 hours. This makes Arctic wolf movement hard to research. About 2,250 km (1,400 mi) south of the High Arctic, a wolf movement study took place in the wintertime in complete darkness, when the temperature was as low as −53 °C (−63 °F). The researchers found that wolves prey mainly on the muskoxen. There is no available information of the wolves' movements where the muskoxen were.

== Diet ==
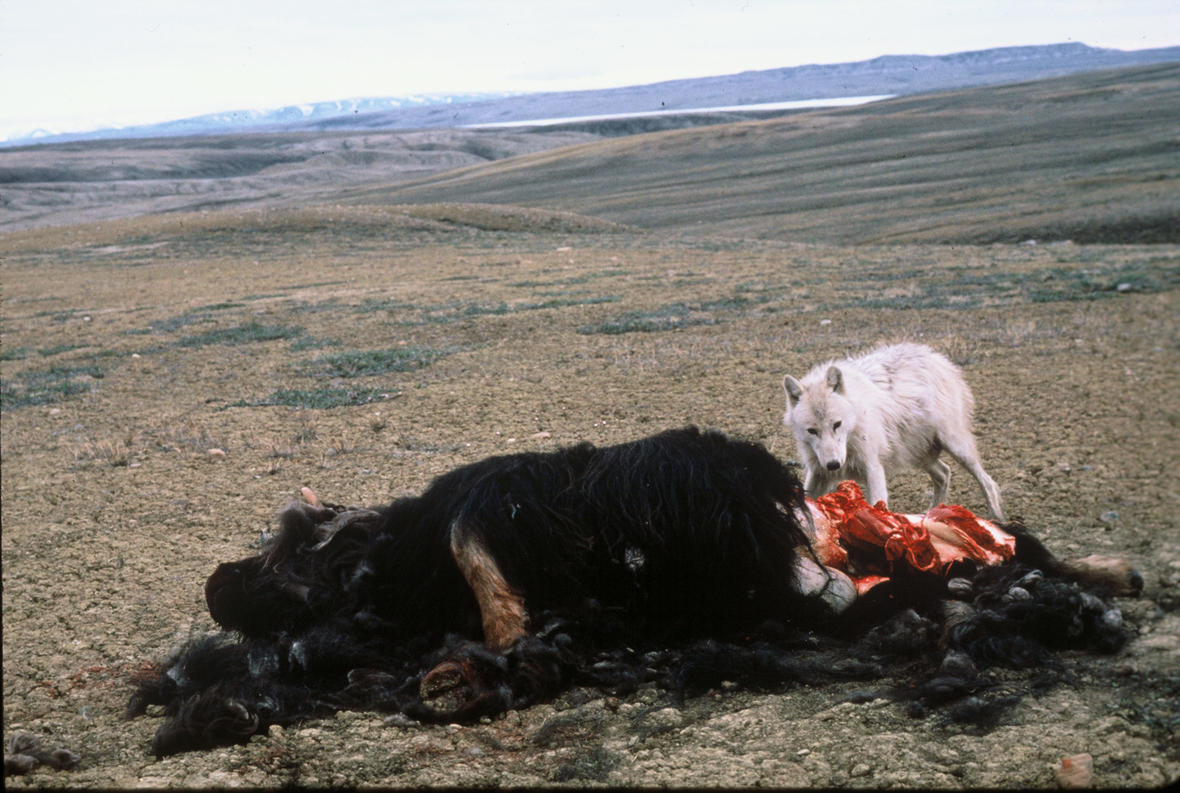
Arctic wolf feeding on muskox carcass in Ellesmere Island

In the wild, Arctic wolves primarily prey on muskoxen and Arctic hares. They have also been found to prey on lemmings, caribou, Arctic foxes, birds, and beetles. It has been also found that Arctic wolves scavenge through garbage. This sort of food source will not always be found in the Arctic wolf's diet because of regional and seasonal availability. There is some debate whether the muskox or the Arctic hare is the primary prey for the hare-wolf-muskox predator-prey system. Evidence suggests that muskoxen provide long-term viability and other ungulates do not appear in the wolf's diet. Evidence suggesting that Arctic wolves depend more on hares claims that the mature wolf population paralleled the increase of hares rather than muskoxen availability. However, the degree of reliance between the two sources of food is uncertain and the amount of consumption between the two species also depends on the season and year. Debate continues when seasonal variations and the diet of young wolves is discussed. According to one study, muskox calves serve as a primary food source because the needs of pups are greater but another study suggests that "when hares were much more plentiful (Mech, 2000), wolves commonly fed them to their pups during summer." These differences may be attributed to location as well. Polar bears are rarely encountered by wolves, though there are two records of wolf packs killing polar bear cubs.

== Conservation ==
The Arctic wolf is least concern, but it does face threats. In 1997, there was a decline in the Arctic wolf population and its prey, muskoxen (Ovibos moschatus), and Arctic hares (Lepus arcticus). This was due to unfavourable weather conditions during the summers for four years. Arctic wolf populations recovered the next summer when weather conditions returned to normal.
