= Northern Canadian Shield taiga =

Taiga ecoregion in Canada

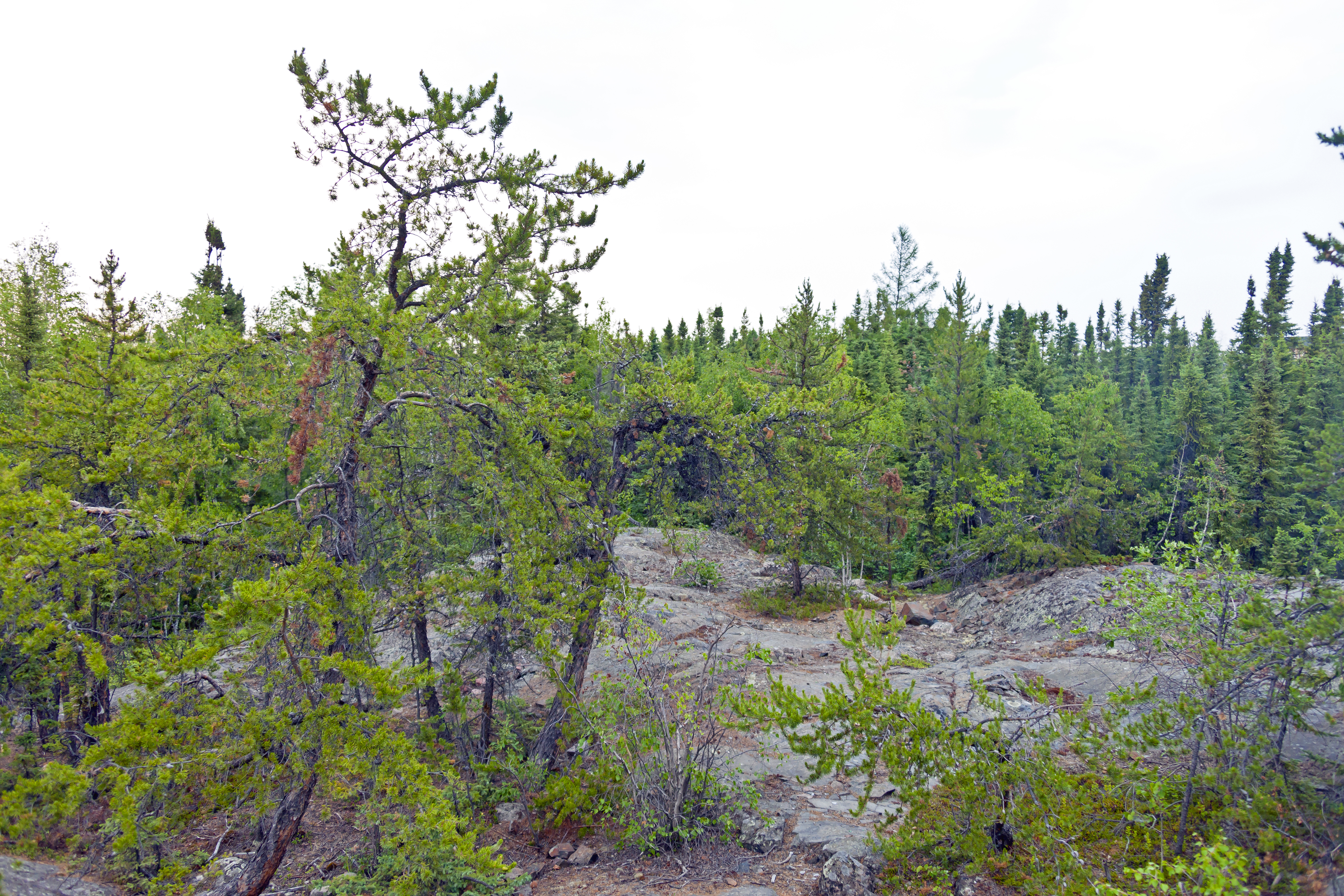
- Taiga in Yellowknife, Northwest Territories

Ecology
- Realm: Nearctic
- Biome: Boreal forests/taiga
- Borders: List: Low Arctic tundra; Mid-Continental Canadian forests; Midwestern Canadian Shield forests; Northwest Territories taiga; South Hudson Bay taiga

Geography
- Area: 613,827 km^{2} (237,000 sq mi)
- Country: Canada
- Province: Alberta; Manitoba; Northwest Territories; Nunavut; Saskatchewan
- Coordinates: 60°00′N 100°00′W

Conservation
- Conservation status: Relatively Stable/Intact

Northern Canadian Shield taiga is a taiga ecoregion located in northern Canada, stretching from Great Bear Lake in the Northwest Territories to Hudson Bay in eastern Nunavut. The region supports conifer forests to its northern edge, where the territory grades into tundra. The open forest in this transition zone is characterized by widely scattered, stunted stands of black spruce (Picea mariana) and tamarack (Larix laricina), with some white spruce (Picea glauca). The ecoregion lies over the northwestern extent of the Canadian Shield.

== Location and description ==
The terrain is broad, sloping uplands reaching to 701 metres (2,300 ft) in elevation, resting on Archean rocks. There are many lakes, with drainage trending towards Great Slave Lake. Permafrost is discontinuous to continuous.

== Climate ==
The climate of the ecoregion is Subarctic climate, without dry season (Köppen climate classification Subarctic climate (Dfc)). This climate is characterized by mild summers (only 1-3 months above 10 °C (50.0 °F)) and cold, snowy winters (coldest month below −3 °C (26.6 °F)). Precipitation averages 200 - 400 mm/year.

== Flora and fauna ==
The ground cover in the ecoregion is 33% herbaceous cover, 15% shrubs, 19% open forest, 15% closed forest. Water bodies cover 18% of the region. The characteristic trees are black spruce (Picea mariana), white spruce (Picea glauca), jack pine (Pinus banksiana) and tamarack (Larix laricina) . Ground cover includes extensive dwarf birch (Betula nana), ericaceous shrubs (Ericaceae), cottongrass (Eriophorum), lichen and moss. The vegetation is relatively undisturbed by human activity, with 90-95% of the region intact.

== Protected areas ==
Approximately 8% of the ecoregion is in an officially protected area, including:

- Wood Buffalo National Park, in the southwest of the region; the largest national park in Canada.
- Thelon Wildlife Sanctuary, located at the northern edge of the ecoregion, north of the treeline.
- Baralzon Lake Ecological Reserve, in Manitoba in the southeast of the region
- Caribou River Provincial Park, on the border between Manitoba and Nunavut, featuring boreal forests and peatlands.
- Numaykoos Lake Provincial Park, in northern Manitoba.
- Fidler-Greywillow Wildland Park, in northern Alberta on the northwest of Lake Athabasca
- Sand Lakes Provincial Park, in northern Manitoba.

== See also ==
- List of ecoregions in Canada (WWF)
- Northern Canadian Shield Taiga One Earth
