= Arctic coastal tundra =

Tundra ecoregion of Canada and the United States

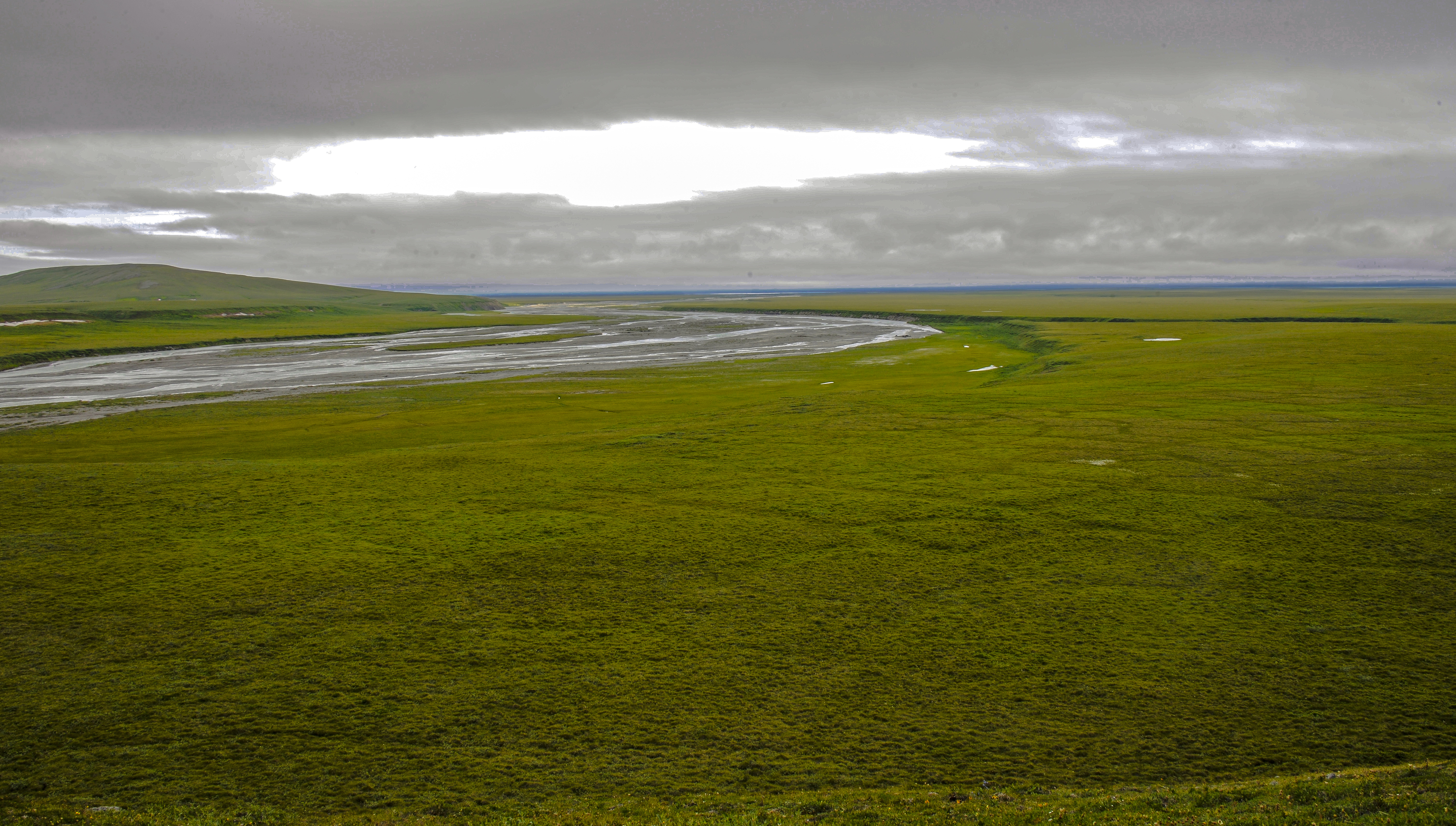
- Tundra vegetation on Yukon's coastal plain at the Firth River delta

- 109. Arctic Coastal Tundra

Ecology
- Realm: Nearctic
- Biome: Tundra
- Borders: Arctic foothills tundra; Low Arctic tundra; Middle Arctic tundra; Northwest Territories taiga
- Animals: caribou, bear, wolf, muskox, snow goose, brant goose, polar bear, fox, lemming, ermine, seal, fish
- Bird species: 74
- Mammal species: 31

Geography
- Area: 98,200 km^{2} (37,900 mi^{2})
- Countries: United States; Canada
- States: Alaska; Northwest Territories; Yukon
- Elevation: 0–150 metres (0–492 ft)
- Geology: coastal plain
- Rivers: the Mackenzie River delta
- Climate type: Tundra (ET)

Conservation
- Conservation status: Relatively Stable/Intact
- Global 200: Yes
- Habitat loss: 0%
- Protected: 49.8%

The Arctic coastal tundra is an ecoregion of the far north of North America, an important breeding ground for a great deal of wildlife.

== Setting ==
This ecoregion is located on the north coast of Alaska, and includes the east coast plain of Banks Island, as well as the Anderson River and Horton River plains, and the Tuktoyaktuk coast in the Northwest Territories. This is an area of low, flat, boggy coastal plains. The underlying soil of this damp Arctic coast is thick, solid permafrost, covered in summer with thermokarst "thaw lakes" of melted ice. Ice features such as ice wedges and pingo mounds of soil and ice can be found. This coast has an arctic climate warm enough to allow plant growth in late-June, July and August only, and even then frosts may occur. On the whole this is a damper, wetter area than the Low Arctic tundra ecoregion that continues along the coast west of here to Quebec.

== Flora ==
This area supports wetland plants especially sedges and grasses, mosses and lichens, and right on the coast there are peat bogs. Trees such as dwarf birch, willows, northern Labrador tea (Dryas) and alders grow in the warmer areas of the region, the Mackenzie River delta and the Yukon coast.

== Fauna ==
This region provides calving habitat for four herds of caribou, the Western Arctic, Teshekpuk, Central Arctic, and Porcupine caribou herds. Another key species is the muskox of Banks Island and the Arctic National Wildlife Refuge coast. Other mammals include lemmings, polar bear, walrus, beluga whale, snowshoe hare and Arctic hare, red fox, grey wolf, Arctic ground squirrel and seals. The coast is also home to many breeding waterbirds including snow goose, spectacled eider, Steller's eider, king eider, red-throated loon, pacific loon, and yellow-billed loon. Important bird areas include the Colville River delta, Teshekpuk Lake (which is within the National Petroleum Reserve–Alaska), and Kasegaluk Lagoon a breeding area for brant goose. Predatory birds include the snowy owls that hunt waterbirds and lemmings. Fish of the waters here include the Arctic char.

== Threats and preservation ==
90% of natural habitat remains intact, except for the vicinity of Utqiaġvik, Alaska and the oil fields of Prudhoe Bay, Alaska and Kuparuk which are expanding along the coast and may in future spread into the Arctic National Wildlife Refuge, which is the only major protected area on this coast (see Arctic Refuge drilling controversy), and on and around the Dalton Highway and the Trans-Alaska Pipeline. The area is one of the "most productive" in the United States for petroleum extraction including a 9 million hectare area reserved for this activity. As Arctic seas warm and ice recedes, it is believed that these areas contained within the Arctic coastal tundra may reveal some of the largest petroleum reserves in the world.

== See also ==
- List of ecoregions in Canada (WWF)
- List of ecoregions in the United States (WWF)
