= Arctic National Wildlife Refuge =

Protected area in Alaska

- IUCN category IV (habitat/species management area)
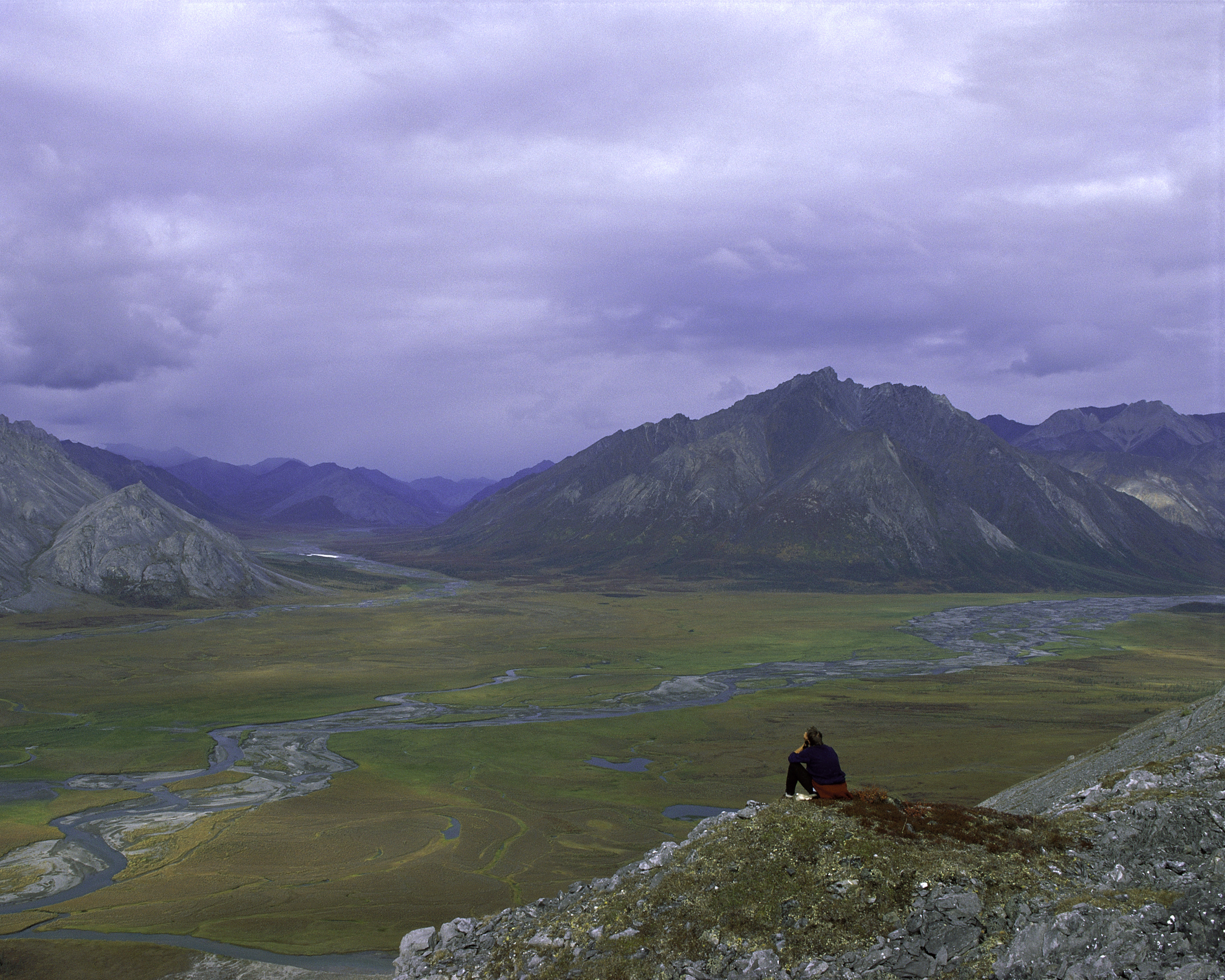
- Refuge during summer
- Interactive map of Arctic National Wildlife Refuge
- Location: North Slope Borough and Yukon–Koyukuk Census Area, Alaska, United States
- Nearest city: Utqiaġvik, Alaska pop. 3,982; Kaktovik, Alaska pop. 258
- Coordinates: 68°45′N 143°30′W
- Area: 19,286,722 acres (78,050.59 km^{2})
- Established: 1960
- Governing body: U.S. Fish and Wildlife Service
- Website: arctic.fws.gov

The Arctic National Wildlife Refuge (ANWR, pronounced as "ANN-warr") or Arctic Refuge is a national wildlife refuge in northeastern Alaska, United States, on traditional Iñupiaq and Gwich'in lands. The refuge covers an area of 19,286,722 acres (78,050.59 km^{2}) in the Alaska North Slope region, with a northern coastline and vast inland forest, taiga, and tundra regions. ANWR is the largest national wildlife refuge in the country, slightly larger than the Yukon Delta National Wildlife Refuge. The refuge is administered from offices in Fairbanks. ANWR is home to a diverse range of endemic mammal species; notably, it is one of the few North American locations with all three endemic American bears, the polar bear, grizzly bear, and American black bear, each of which resides predominantly in its own ecological niche. Besides bears, other mammal species include moose, caribou, wolves, red and Arctic foxes, Canada lynx, wolverine, pine marten, American beaver, and North American river otter. Further inland, mountain goats may be seen near the slope. Hundreds of species of migratory birds visit the refuge yearly, and it is a vital, protected breeding location for them. Snow geese, eiders and snowy owls may be observed as well.

Just across the border in Yukon, Canada, are two Canadian National Parks, Ivvavik and Vuntut.

== History ==
The Arctic Refuge is part of the traditional homelands of many bands or tribes of the Gwichʼin people. For thousands of years, the Gwich'in have called the coastal plain of the Arctic Refuge "Iizhik Gwats'an Gwandaii Goodlit" (The Sacred Place Where Life Begins). Climate change is rapidly affecting the Arctic region, with melting polar ice caps leading to rising sea levels and warming due to the albedo effect. The potential oil drilling in the Arctic National Wildlife Refuge threatens the Porcupine caribou herd's calving grounds, while climate change forces polar bears to change their hunting and denning patterns. Additionally, the unique marine ecosystem of the Arctic basin is being disturbed by industrial noise and oil exploration. The Inupiaq village of Kaktovik, a community that has adapted to this harsh environment over thousands of years, also faces potential disruption.

The National Wildlife Refuge System was founded by President Theodore Roosevelt in 1903, to protect immense areas of wildlife and wetlands in the United States. This refuge system created the Migratory Bird Treaty Act of 1918 which conserves the wildlife of Alaska.

In 1929, a 28-year-old forester named Bob Marshall visited the upper Koyukuk River and the central Brooks Range on his summer vacation "in what seemed on the map to be the most unknown section of Alaska."

In February 1930, Marshall published an essay, "The Problem of the Wilderness", a spirited defense of wilderness preservation in The Scientific Monthly, arguing that wilderness was worth saving not only because of its unique aesthetic qualities, but because it could provide visitors with a chance for adventure. Marshall stated: "There is just one hope of repulsing the tyrannical ambition of civilization to conquer every niche on the whole earth. That hope is the organization of spirited people who will fight for the freedom of the wilderness." The article became a much-quoted call to action and by the late 20th century was considered seminal by wilderness historians. According to environmental journalist Brooke Jarvis, "Marshall saw the enormous, largely unsettled Arctic lands he had explored as a possible antidote to this—not another chance to keep chasing America's so-called Manifest Destiny but a chance to finally stop chasing it." Even for Americans who would never travel there, "he thought they would benefit knowing that it still existed in the condition it always had." "In Alaska alone", Marshall wrote, "can the emotional values of the frontier be preserved."

In 1953, an article was published in the journal of the Sierra Club by then National Park Service planner George Collins and biologist Lowell Sumner titled "Northeast Alaska: The Last Great Wilderness". Collins and Sumner then recruited Wilderness Society President Olaus Murie and his wife Margaret Murie with an effort to permanently protect the area.

In 1954, the National Park Service recommended that the untouched areas in the Northeastern region of Alaska be preserved for research and protection of nature. The question of whether to drill for oil in the National Wildlife Arctic Refuge has been a political controversy since 1977. The debate mainly concerns section 1002 in the ANWR. Section 1002 is located on the coastal plain where many of the Arctic's diverse wildlife species reside. There are two sides of this debate: support for drilling and the opposition of drilling.

In 1956, Olaus and Mardy Murie led an expedition to the Brooks Range in northeast Alaska, where they dedicated an entire summer to studying the land and wildlife ecosystems of the Upper Sheenjek Valley. The conclusion resulting from these studies was an ever-deeper sense of the importance of preserving the area intact, a determination that would play an instrumental part in the decision to designate the area as wilderness in 1960. As Olaus would later say in a 1963 speech to a meeting of the Wildlife Management Association of New Mexico State University, "On our trips to the Arctic Wildlife Range we saw clearly that it was not a place for mass recreation... It takes a lot of territory to keep this alive, a living wilderness, for scientific observation and for esthetic inspiration. The Far North is a fragile place." Environmentalist Celia M. Hunter met the Muries and joined the fight. Founding the Alaska Conservation Society in 1960, Celia worked tirelessly to garner support for the protection of Alaskan wilderness ecosystems.

The region first became a federal protected area on December 6, 1960, via an order authored by Ted Stevens, Solicitor of the Interior, and signed by Fred Andrew Seaton, Secretary of the Interior under U.S. President Dwight D. Eisenhower. In 1980, Congress passed the Alaska National Interest Lands Conservation Act. The bill was signed into law by President Jimmy Carter on 2 December 1980.

Eight million acres (32,000 km^{2}) of the refuge are designated as wilderness area, the Mollie Beattie Wilderness. The expansion of the refuge in 1980 designated 1.5 million acres (6,100 km^{2}) of the coastal plain as the 1002 area and mandated studies of the natural resources of this area, especially petroleum. Congressional authorization is required before oil drilling may proceed in this area. The remaining 10.1 million acres (41,000 km^{2}) of the refuge are designated as "minimal management", a category intended to maintain existing natural conditions and resource values. These areas are suitable for wilderness designation, although there are presently no proposals to designate them as wilderness.

Currently, there are no roads within or leading into the refuge, but there are a few Native settlements scattered within. On the northern edge of the refuge is the Inupiat village of Kaktovik (population 258) and on the southern boundary the Gwich'in settlement of Arctic Village (population 152). A popular wilderness route and historic passage exists between the two villages, traversing the refuge and all its ecosystems from boreal, interior forest to Arctic Ocean coast. Generally, visitors gain access to the land by aircraft, but it is also possible to reach the refuge by boat or by walking (the Dalton Highway passes near the western edge of the refuge). In the United States, the geographic location most remote from human trails, roads, or settlements is found here, at the headwaters of the Sheenjek River.

== Geography ==
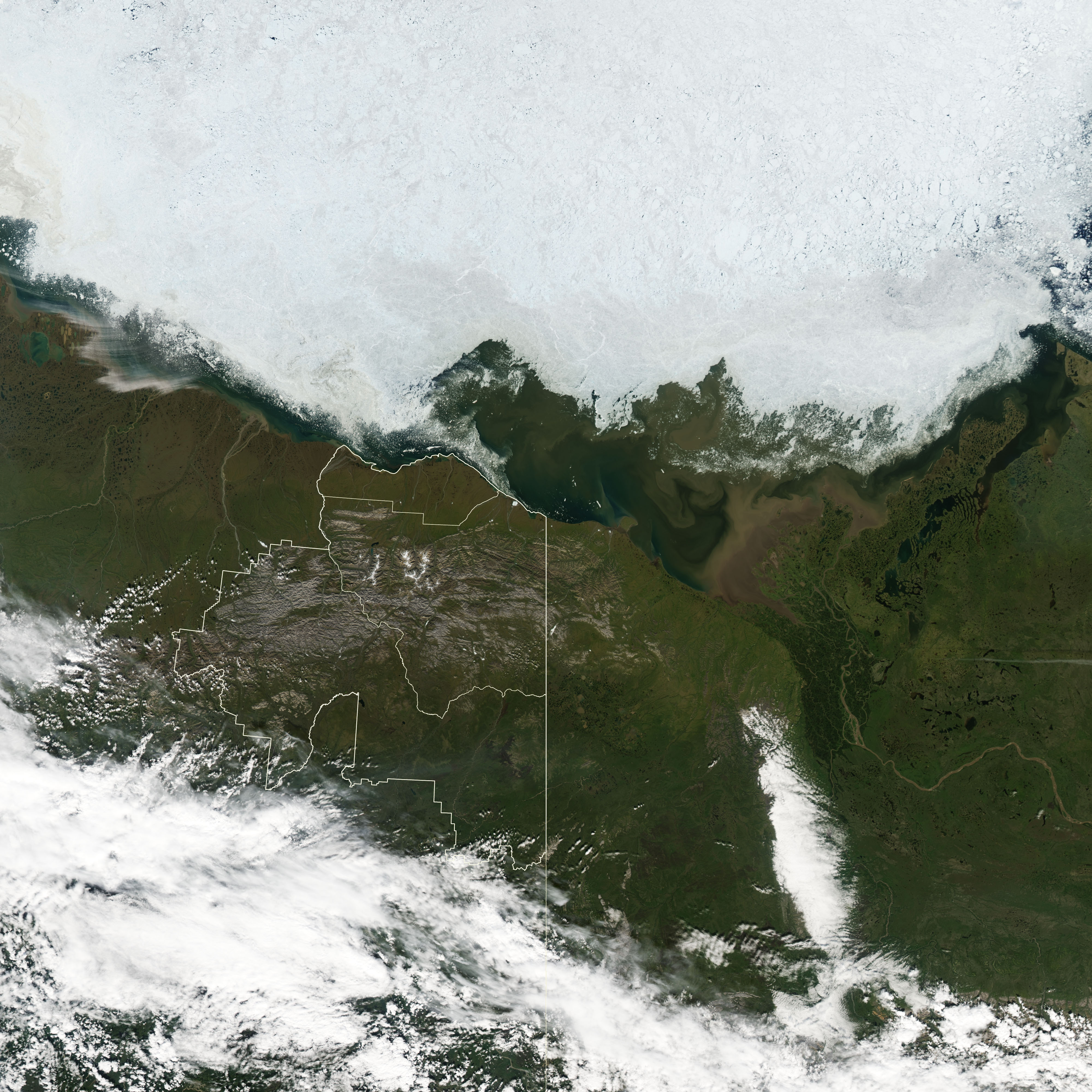
Natural-color satellite image of the refuge. Thick white lines delineate refuge boundaries, and thin white lines separate areas within the park.

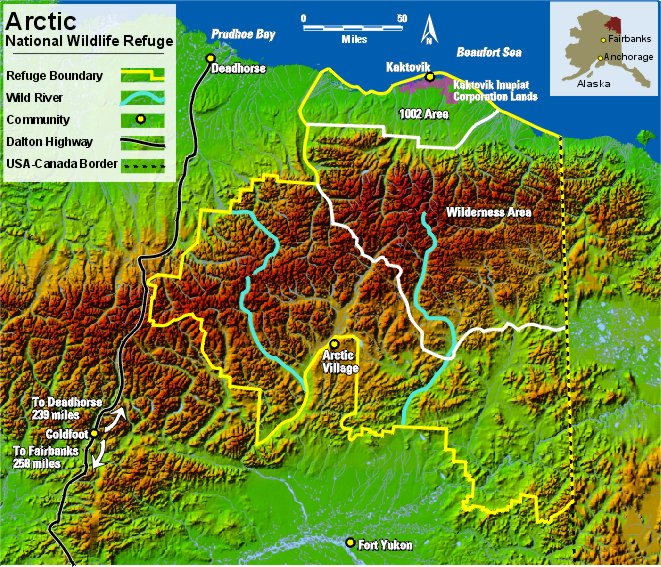
Arctic National Wildlife Refuge Map

The Arctic is mostly an ocean surrounded by land. The Arctic is relatively covered by water, much of it is frozen. The glaciers and icebergs in the Arctic make up about 10% of Earth's land area. Most of the Arctic's liquid saltwater is from the Arctic Ocean's basin. Some parts of the ocean's surface are frozen all or most of the year. The Arctic area is mainly known for sea ice surrounding the region. The Arctic experiences extreme solar radiation. During the Northern Hemisphere's winter months, the Arctic experiences cold and darkness which makes it one of the unique places on Earth. North America's two largest alpine lakes (Peters and Schrader) are located inside the refuge. ANWR is nearly the size of South Carolina.

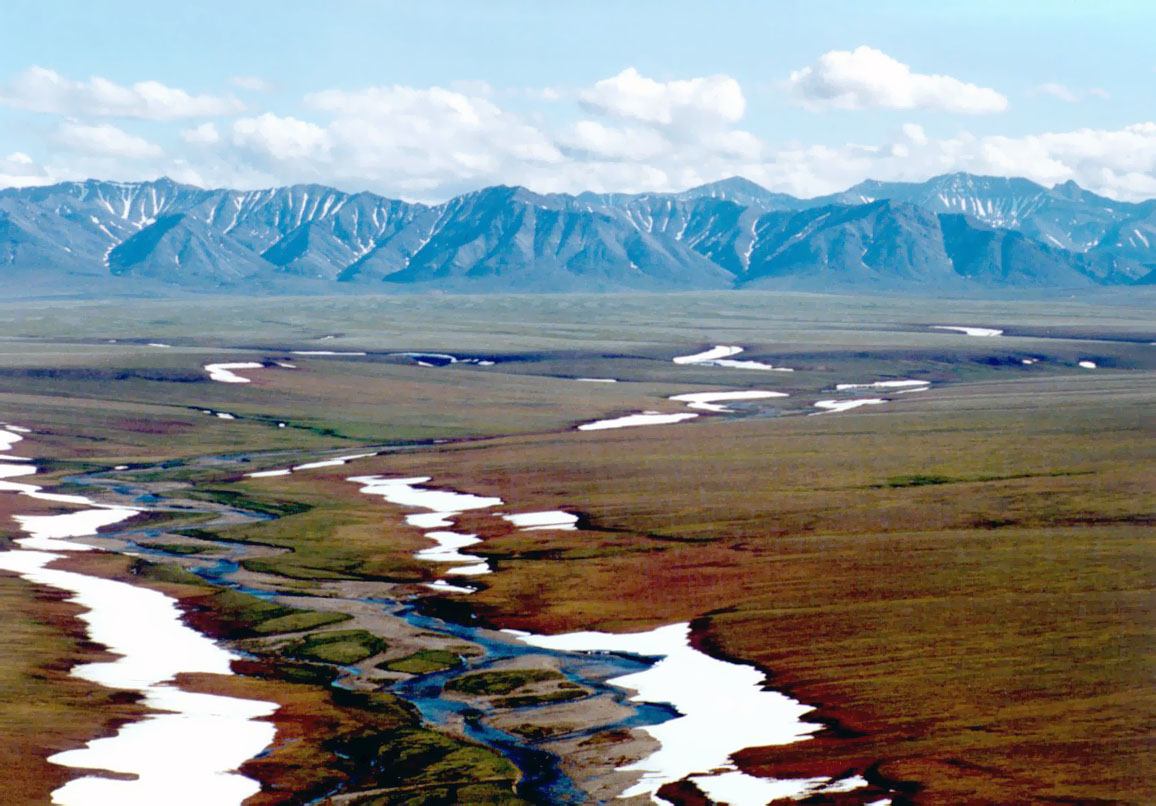
Area 1002 of the Arctic National Wildlife Refuge coastal plain, looking south toward the Brooks Range mountains

The refuge supports a greater variety of plant and animal life than any other protected area in the Arctic Circle. A continuum of six different ecozones spans about 200 miles (300 km) north to south.

Along the northern coast of the refuge, the barrier islands, coastal lagoons, salt marshes, and river deltas of the Arctic coastal tundra provide habitat for migratory waterbirds including sea ducks, geese, swans, and shorebirds. Fish such as dolly varden and Arctic cisco are found in nearshore waters. Coastal lands and sea ice are used by caribou seeking relief from biting insects during summer, and by polar bears hunting seals and giving birth in snow dens during winter.

The Arctic coastal plain stretches southward from the coast to the foothills of the Brooks Range. This area of rolling hills, small lakes, and north-flowing, braided rivers is dominated by tundra vegetation consisting of low shrubs, sedges, and mosses. Caribou travel to the coastal plain during June and July to give birth and raise their young. Migratory birds and insects flourish here during the brief Arctic summer. Tens of thousands of snow geese stop here during September to feed before migrating south, and muskoxen live here year-round.

South of the coastal plain, the mountains of the eastern Brooks Range rise to nearly 9,000 feet (2,700 m). This northernmost extension of the Rocky Mountains marks the continental divide, with north-flowing rivers emptying into the Arctic Ocean and south-flowing rivers joining the great Yukon River. The rugged mountains of the Brooks Range are incised by deep river valleys creating a range of elevations and aspects that support a variety of low tundra vegetation, dense shrubs, rare groves of poplar trees on the north side and spruce on the south. During summer, peregrine falcons, gyrfalcons, and golden eagles build nests on cliffs. Harlequin ducks and red-breasted mergansers are seen on swift-flowing rivers. Dall sheep, muskoxen, and Alaskan Arctic tundra wolves are active all year, while grizzly bears and Arctic ground squirrels are frequently seen during summer but hibernate in winter.

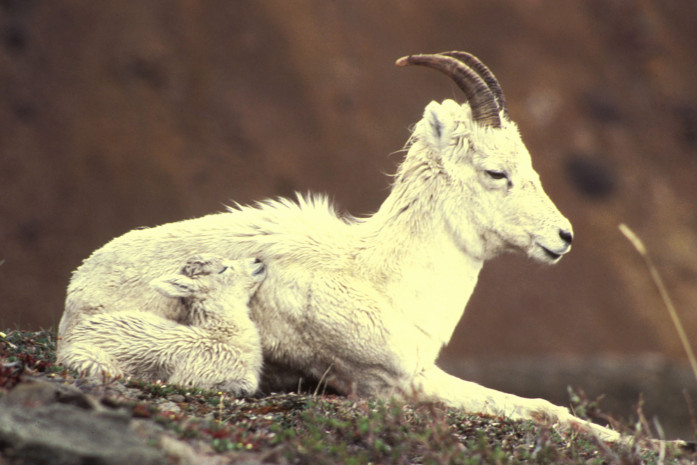
Dall sheep at ANWR

The southern portion of the Arctic Refuge is within the Interior Alaska-Yukon lowland taiga (boreal forest) ecoregion. Beginning as predominantly treeless tundra with scattered islands of black and white spruce trees, the forest becomes progressively denser as the foothills yield to the expansive flats north of the Yukon River. Frequent forest fires ignited by lightning result in a complex mosaic of birch, aspen, and spruce forests of various ages. Wetlands and south-flowing rivers create openings in the forest canopy. Neotropical migratory birds breed here in spring and summer, attracted by plentiful food and the variety of habitats. Caribou travel here from farther north to spend the winter. Other year-round residents of the boreal forest include moose, polar foxes, beavers, Canadian lynxes, martens, red foxes, river otters, porcupines, muskrats, black bears, wolverines, wolves and minks.

Each year, thousands of waterfowl and other birds nest and reproduce in areas surrounding Prudhoe Bay and Kuparuk fields and a healthy and increasing caribou herd migrates through these areas to calve and seek respite from annoying pests.

== Drilling ==
External videos
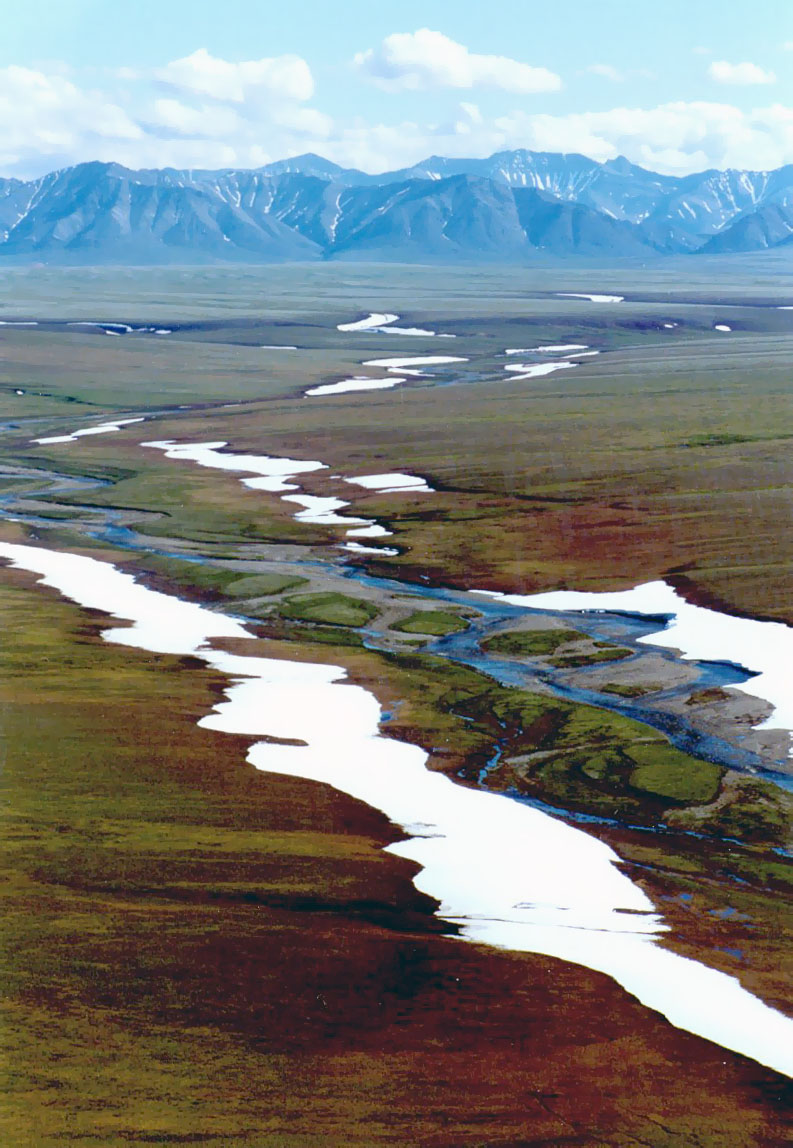
- Protecting the Arctic National Wildlife Refuge, The White House, 0:58

The question of whether to drill for oil in the ANWR has been an ongoing political controversy in the United States since 1977.

The controversy surrounds drilling for oil in a subsection of the coastal plain, known as the "1002 area". ANWR is 19,286,722 acres (78,050.59 km^{2}). The coastal plain is 1,500,000 acres (6,100 km^{2}). The current proposal would limit development to 2,000 acres (8.1 km^{2}) of that plain.

Much of the debate over whether to drill in the 1002 area of ANWR rests on the amount of economically recoverable oil, as it relates to world oil markets, weighed against the potential harm oil exploration might have upon the natural wildlife, in particular the calving ground of the Porcupine caribou. The Arctic was found to have an immense amount of oil and natural gas deposits. Specifically, ANWR occupies land beneath which there may be 7.7 to 11.8 billion bbl (1.22 to 1.88 billion m^{3}) of oil. In Alaska, it is known for major oil companies to work with the indigenous groups, Alaska native corporations, to drill and export millions of barrels of oil each year.

People who oppose the drilling in the Arctic National Wildlife Refuge believe that it would be a threat to the lives of indigenous tribes. Those tribes rely on the ANWR's wildlife, the animals and plants that reside in the refuge. Moreover, the practice of drilling could present a potential threat to the region as a whole. When companies are exploring and drilling they are extracting the vegetation and destroying permafrost which can cause harm to the land.

In December 2017, Congress passed the Trump administration's tax bill which included a provision introduced by Senator Lisa Murkowski that required Interior Secretary Ryan Zinke to approve at least two lease sales for drilling in the refuge. In September 2019, the administration said they would like to see the entire coastal plain opened for gas and oil exploration, the most aggressive of the suggested development options. The Interior Department's Bureau of Land Management (BLM) has filed a final environmental impact statement and plans to start granting leases by the end of the year. In a review of the statement the U.S. Fish and Wildlife Service said the BLM's final statement underestimated the climate impacts of the oil leases because they viewed global warming as cyclical rather than human-made. The administration's plan calls for "the construction of as many as four places for airstrips and well pads, 175 miles [282 km] of roads, vertical supports for pipelines, a seawater-treatment plant and a barge landing and storage site."

In response to public outcry and concerns of worsening climate change, U.S. banks Goldman Sachs, JPMorgan Chase and Wells Fargo publicly announced that they will not fund oil and gas projects in the Arctic region. These decisions come as President Donald Trump's administration is proceeding with planned lease sales in the Refuge.

On August 17, 2020, Interior Secretary David Bernhardt announced an oil and gas leasing program in the Arctic National Wildlife Refuge. This will allow for future drilling in the Refuge.

An auction for the land leases was held on January 6, 2021. Of the twenty-two tracts up for auction, full bids were offered for only eleven tracts. An Alaskan state entity, the Alaska Industrial Development and Export Authority, won the bids on nine tracts. Two small independent companies, Knik Arm Services LLC and Regenerate Alaska Inc, won one tract each. The auction generated $14.4 million, significantly lower than the $1.8 billion estimate from the Congressional Budget Office in 2019, and the auction did not receive bids from any oil and gas companies. A second auction in December 2024 and January 2025 also did not receive bids from any oil and gas companies.

On January 20, 2021, newly inaugurated President Joe Biden issued an executive order to temporarily halt drilling activity in the refuge.

On June 1, 2021, President Biden suspended all of the oil drilling leases issued by the previous administration, pending a review of the environmental impacts and legal basis of the leases. On September 6, 2023, the Biden administration cancelled the leases. In January, 2025, the Dunleavy administration sued the Biden administration, claiming Arctic refuge lease sale restrictions violate a 2017 law mandating development.

On January 20, 2025, President Trump declared the protected wildlife refuge open for gas and oil exploration via executive action on his first day in office.

== Climate change ==
Scientists are noticing that sea levels are rising at increasing rates. Sea levels are rising because polar ice caps are melting at a rapid pace. This process starts in the Arctic region, specifically in Alaska. Researchers at Oxford University explained that increasing temperatures, melting glaciers, thawing permafrost, and rising sea levels are all indications of warming throughout the Arctic. Sea Ice has thinned and decreased. Thinning has occurred due to the sun melting the ice at a higher pace. This backs up the concept of how the Arctic region is the first to be affected by climate change. Shorefast ice tends to form later in fall. In September 2007, the concentration of sea ice in the Arctic Ocean was significantly less than ever previously recorded. Although the total area of ice built up in recent years, the amount of ice continued to decline because of this thinning. Climate change is happening faster and more severe in the Arctic compared to the rest of the world. According to NASA, the Arctic is the first place that will be affected by global climate change. This is because shiny ice and snow reflect a high proportion of the sun's energy into space. The Arctic gradually loses snow and ice, bare rock and water absorb more and more of the sun's energy, making the Arctic even warmer. This phenomenon is called the albedo effect.

=== Porcupine caribou herd ===
This area for possible future oil drilling on the coastal plains of the Arctic National Wildlife Refuge, encompasses much of the Porcupine caribou calving grounds. Migratory caribou herds are named after their birthing grounds, in this case the Porcupine River, which runs through a large part of the range of the Porcupine herd. In 2001, some biologists feared development in the Refuge would "push caribou into the foothills, where calves would be more prone to predation." Though numbers fluctuate, there were approximately 169,000 animals in the herd in 2010. Their annual land migration of 1,500 miles (2,400 km), between their winter range in the boreal forests of Alaska and northwest Canada over the mountains to the coastal plain and their calving grounds on the Beaufort Sea coastal plain, is the longest of any land mammal on earth.

In 2001, proponents of the development of the oil fields at Prudhoe Bay and Kuparuk, which would be approximately 60 miles (97 km) west of the Refuge, argued that Central Arctic caribou herd, had increased its numbers "in spite of several hundred miles of gravel roads and more than a thousand miles of elevated pipe." However, the Central Arctic herd is much smaller than the Porcupine herd, and has an area that is much larger. By 2008 the Central Arctic caribou herd had approximately 67,000 animals.

=== Polar bears ===
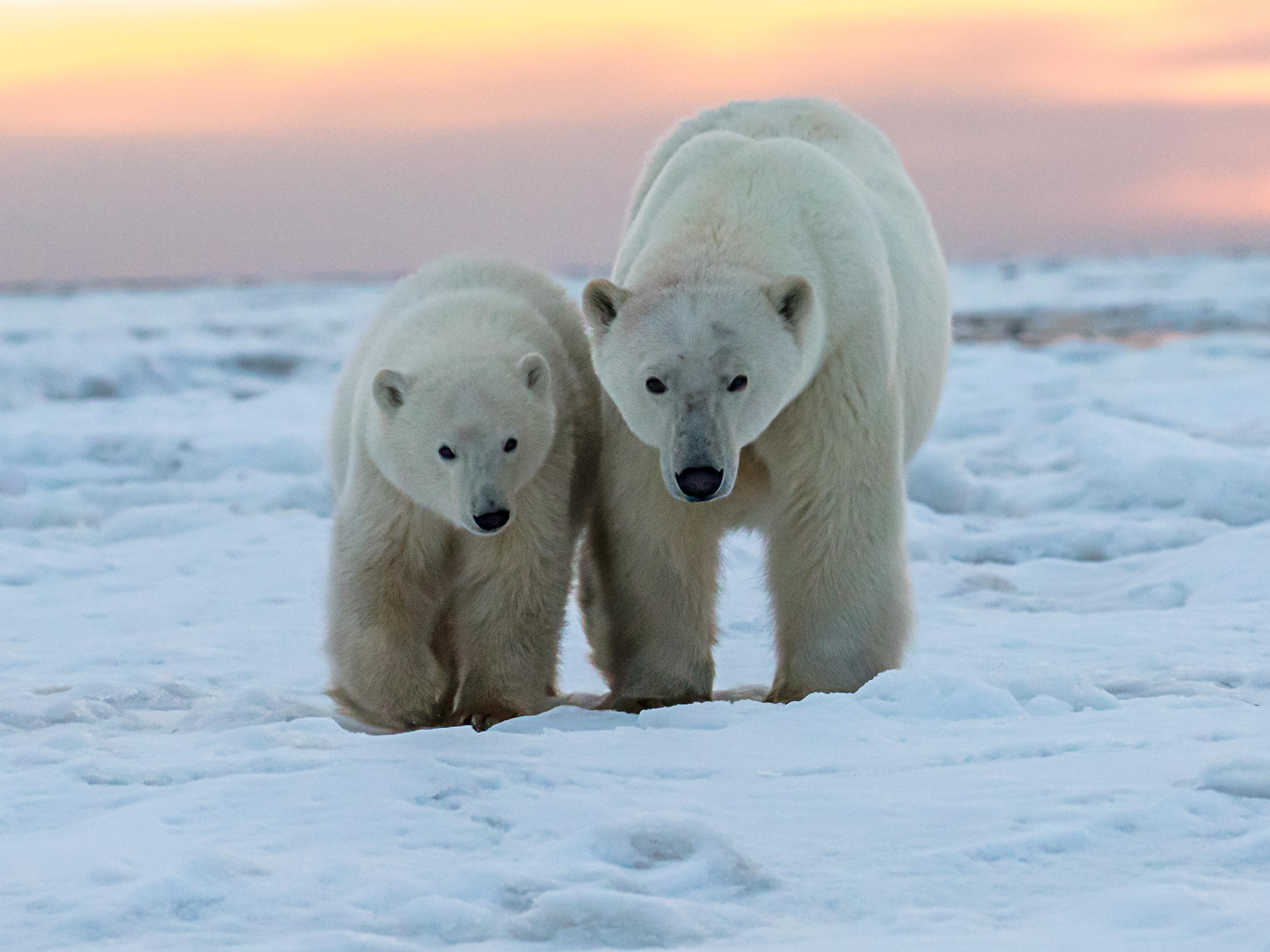
Two Polar Bears

The Arctic National Wildlife Refuge is directly connected to Polar Bears. These bears are known for traveling in the region to den and give birth. Nearly 50 of these species migrate along the coast to the refuge in September. These bears extend more than 800 miles (1,300 km) along the coast of Northern Alaska and Canada. Due to changes in climate, Polar bears are recorded to now spend more time on land waiting on new sea ice to form, as they depend on sea ice for much of their hunting. This limits their ability to hunt seals to build up fat for hibernation. Much controversial, the polar bears are widely affected by the climate change happening in this region. Pregnant females are forced to move onshore at unusual times to dig their dens. Usually, the bears are known to dig their dens in November, then give birth to one to two tiny cubs in December or January. The mothers then nurse and care for the young until March or early April, when they loom from the dens. After several days adapting to the outside environment, the families leave the dens. They move back to the sea ice to hunt ringed seals and other prey. The cubs always stay with their mothers for about the next two and a half years. Polar Bears follow the trace of current carrying sea ice which leads them to travel south. This often leads them to relying on trash abundances for nutrition. This food source impacts the health of polar bears negatively. They also begin targeting unusual animals as prey.

The Arctic National Wildlife Refuge is the only refuge that regularly dens polar bears in that local region, and contains the most consistent number of polar bears in the area.

=== Marine ecosystem ===
The Arctic basin is the shallowest ocean basin on Earth. It is the least salty, because of low evaporation and large current of freshwater from rivers and glaciers. River mouths and calving glaciers, are continually moving ocean currents contribute to a unique marine ecosystem in the Arctic. The cold, circulating water is rich in minerals, as well as the microscopic organisms (such as phytoplankton and algae) that need them to grow. Marine animals thrive in the Arctic. There are 12 species of marine mammals of the Arctic found in the refuge. They consist of four species of whales, polar bears, the walrus and six species of ice-associated seals, sperm whales, blue whales, fin whales, humpback whales, killer whales, Harbor Porpoise. The Arctic marine food web consists of Primary consumers, Secondary consumers, Tertiary consumers, and scavengers. Marine mammals in the Arctic are experiencing severe impacts, including effects on migration, from disturbances such as noises from industrial activity, offshore seismic oil exploration, and well drilling.

== People ==
The people who live in this Refuge have become accustomed over thousands of years to both survive and prosper in these harsh conditions. There are two villages whose history are tied to the Arctic Refuge and have been for thousands of years which are the Kaktovik and the Arctic Village. Kaktovik is an Inupiaq village of about 250 current residents located within the Arctic National Wildlife Refuge along the Beaufort Sea. The Inupiaq Village is used as a traditional summer fishing and hunting location. Furthermore, this location also became a usual place for commercial whalers in the late 1800s, which led them to become permanent residents in the Refuge.

The Arctic Village is a Gwich'in village found just south of the Arctic National Wildlife Refuge's borders. The Gwich'in people are Indigenous to the Arctic regions of Alaska and Canada and have a profound connection to the Arctic National Wildlife Refuge (ANWR). For centuries, their livelihoods and cultural practices have been intertwined with the land and its wildlife, particularly the Porcupine Caribou Herd, which migrates annually to the refuge's coastal plain to calve . This area, known to the Gwich'in as "Iizhik Gwats'an Gwandaii Goodlit" or "the sacred place where life begins", is central to their subsistence and spiritual and cultural traditions. Given this deep relationship with the land and its wildlife, any threat to the refuge reverberates through the Gwich'in community in profound ways.

The proposed oil and gas development in ANWR's coastal plain poses significant threats to the Gwich'in way of life. The Porcupine Caribou Herd's reliance on this calving ground means that any disruption could lead to adverse effects on the herd's health and migration patterns, thereby impacting the Gwich'in's primary food source and cultural practices. This concern is not only about environmental preservation but also about protecting human rights and food sovereignty. In their advocacy, the Gwich'in emphasize the inseparable bond between their identity and the caribou. This deep-seated connection drives their ongoing resistance to oil exploration and drilling in ANWR, as they strive to protect both their cultural heritage and the ecological integrity of their ancestral lands.

== See also ==
- Alaska Wilderness League
- Arctic Refuge drilling controversy
- Jonathon Solomon
- National Petroleum Reserve–Alaska
- Natural resources of the Arctic
- Arctic policy of the United States
- The Last Alaskans (television series)
