= Arctic realm =

Group of marine ecoregions in the Arctic zone

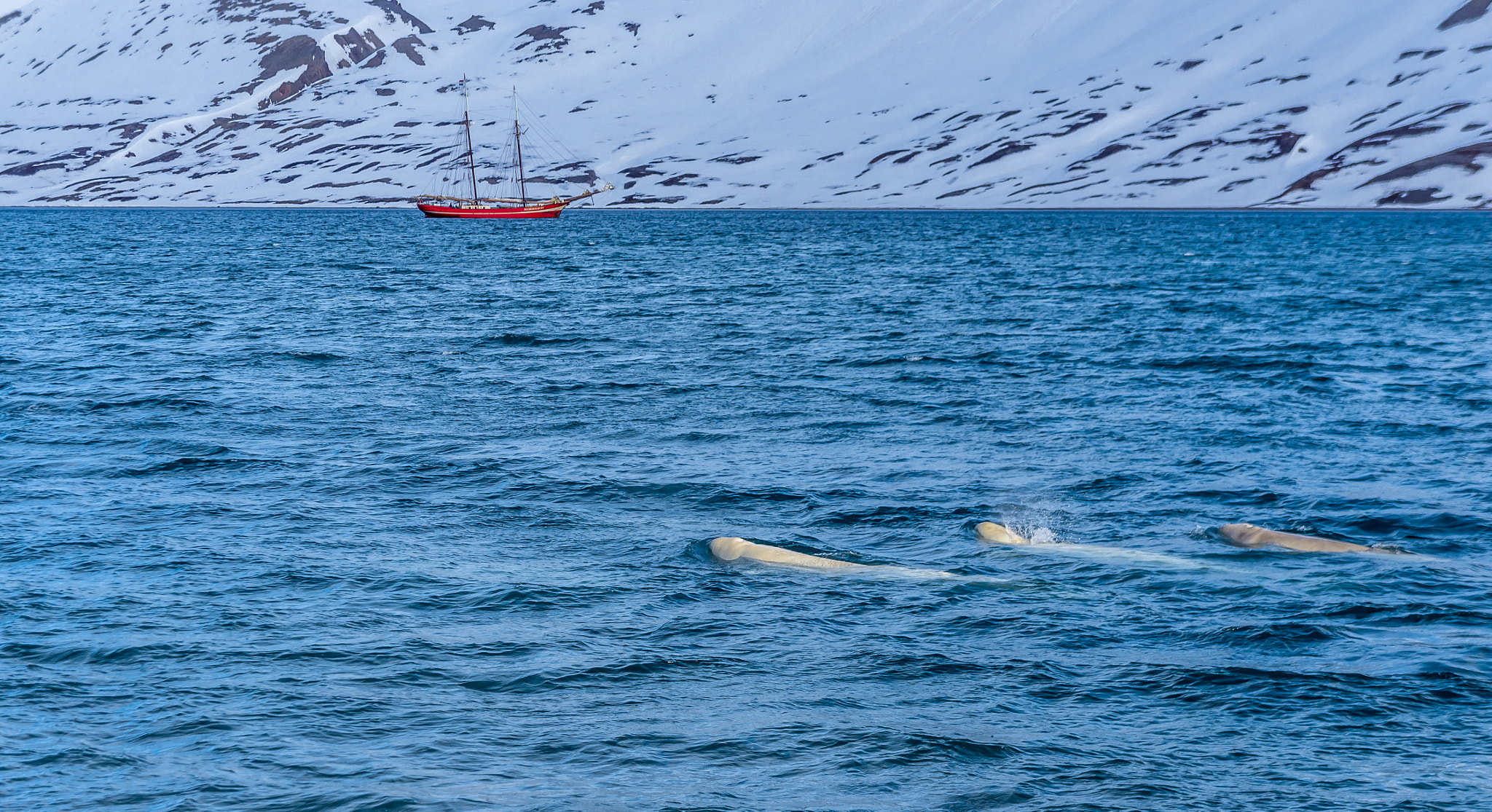
Beluga whales breaching off the coast of Svalbard, Norway

The Arctic realm is one of the planet's twelve marine realms, as designated by the WWF and Nature Conservancy. It includes the coastal regions and continental shelves of the Arctic Ocean and adjacent seas, including the Arctic Archipelago, Hudson Bay, and the Labrador Sea of northern Canada, the seas surrounding Greenland, the northern and eastern coasts of Iceland, and the eastern Bering Sea.

The Arctic realm transitions to the Temperate Northern Atlantic realm in the Atlantic Basin, and the Temperate Northern Pacific realm in the Pacific Basin.

== Ecoregions ==
The Arctic realm is further subdivided into 19 marine ecoregions:

- North Greenland
- North and East Iceland
- East Greenland Shelf
- West Greenland Shelf
- Northern Grand Banks-Southern Labrador
- Northern Labrador
- Baffin Bay-Davis Strait
- Hudson Complex
- Lancaster Sound
- High Arctic Archipelago
- Beaufort-Amundsen-Viscount Melville-Queen Maud
- Beaufort Sea-continental coast and shelf
- Chukchi Sea
- Eastern Bering Sea
- East Siberian Sea
- Laptev Sea
- Kara Sea
- North and East Barents Sea
- White Sea
