= Yukon Interior dry forests =

Taiga ecoregion of British Columbia and Yukon, Canada

Yukon Interior Dry Forests
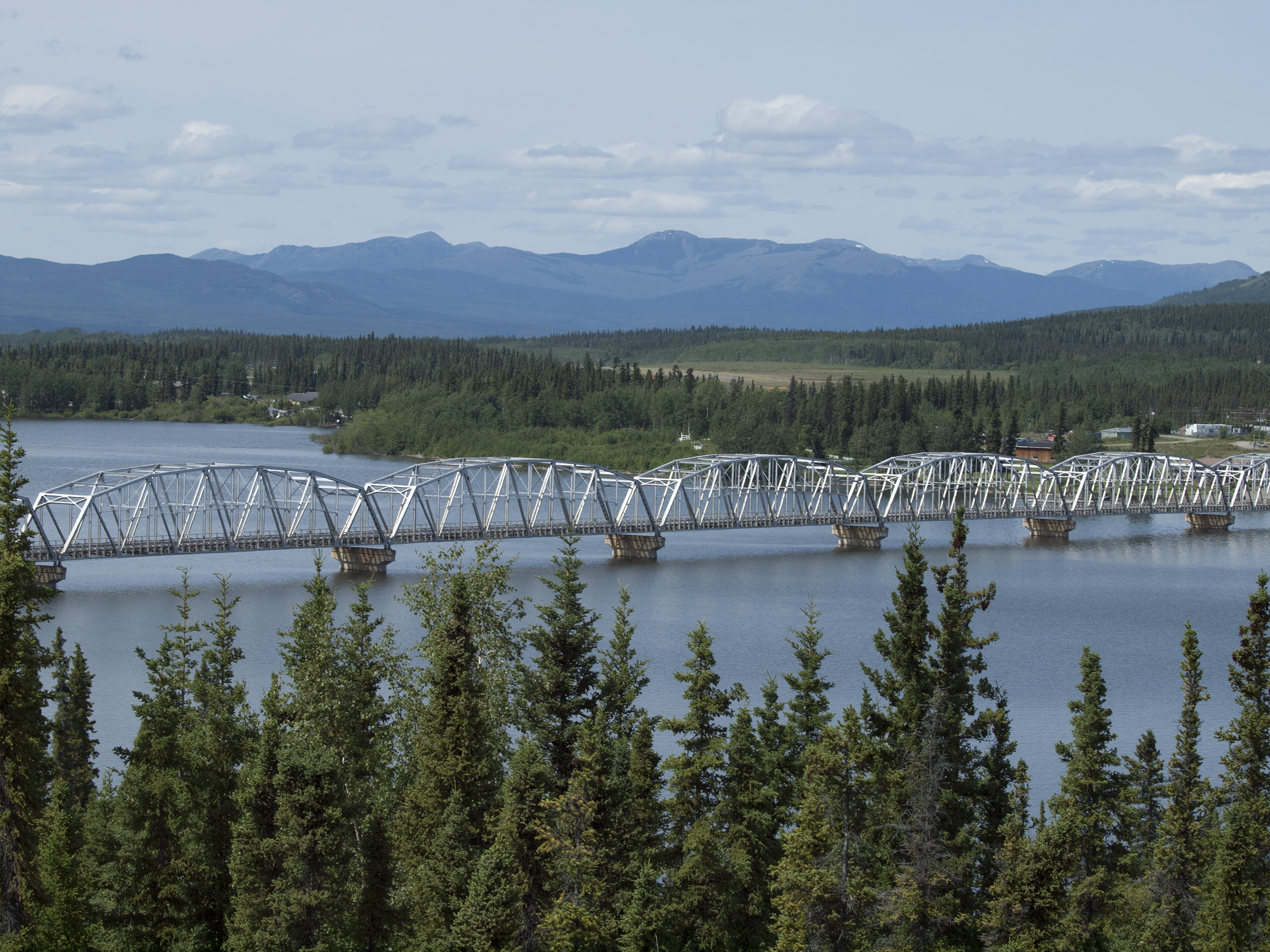
- Interior dry forests of the Teslin Plateau, Yukon

Ecology
- Realm: Nearctic
- Biome: Boreal forests/taiga

Geography
- Area: 62,419 km^{2} (24,100 mi^{2})
- Country: Canada
- Province: British Columbia; Yukon

Conservation
- Conservation status: Vulnerable

The Yukon Interior dry forests is a taiga ecoregion of Canada.

== Setting ==
This ecoregion, which covers much of the southern Yukon and a very small portion of northwestern British Columbia, is mainly located on the Yukon Plateau, which consists of rolling hills, plateaus and deeply cut, broad valleys. The area has a dry subarctic climate, with summer temperatures averaging around 11 °C (52 °F), and winter temperatures averaging from −16.5 to −19 °C (2.3 to −2.2 °F). Precipitation is low, averaging between 225–400 mm (8.9-15.7 in), with higher elevation areas and areas to the north-east receiving greater precipitation.

== Flora ==
Black spruce (Picea mariana) and white spruce (Picea glauca) are the two most common trees, with lodgepole pine (Pinus contorta subsp. latifolia) being found in very dry or burnt sites. South-facing, low elevation slopes are often characterised by grassland communities. Dwarf birch, willow and subalpine fir (Abies lasiocarpa) are found the subalpine zone below the tree line, while the alpine zone above supports a sparse vegetative cover consisting of mountain avens, dwarf shrubs, forbs, grasses and lichen.

== Fauna ==
Mammals of this ecoregion include caribou (Rangifer tarandus), moose (Alces alces), mountain goat (Oreamnus americanus), Dall sheep (Ovis dalli), grizzly bear (Ursos arctos horribilis), black bear (Ursus americanus), gray wolf (Canis lupus), coyote (Canis latrans), beaver (Castor canadensis) and hare. Avian species include the common raven (Corvus corax), ptarmigan and golden eagle (Aquila chryaetos).

== Threats and preservation ==
This ecoregion is well preserved, with an estimated 75% intact. Uplands are better preserved than valley bottoms, wherein most of the development in this ecoregion has taken place. There are no large protected areas in this ecoregion, but smaller areas are the Charlie Cole Creek Ecological Reserve and the Nisutlin River Delta National Wildlife Area. Timber harvesting, mining and a state-sponsored wolf kill are the greatest threats to the region's ecological integrity.

== See also ==
- List of ecoregions in Canada (WWF)
