= Ogilvie–MacKenzie alpine tundra =

Tundra ecoregion of Canada and the United States

Ogilvie-MacKenzie alpine tundra
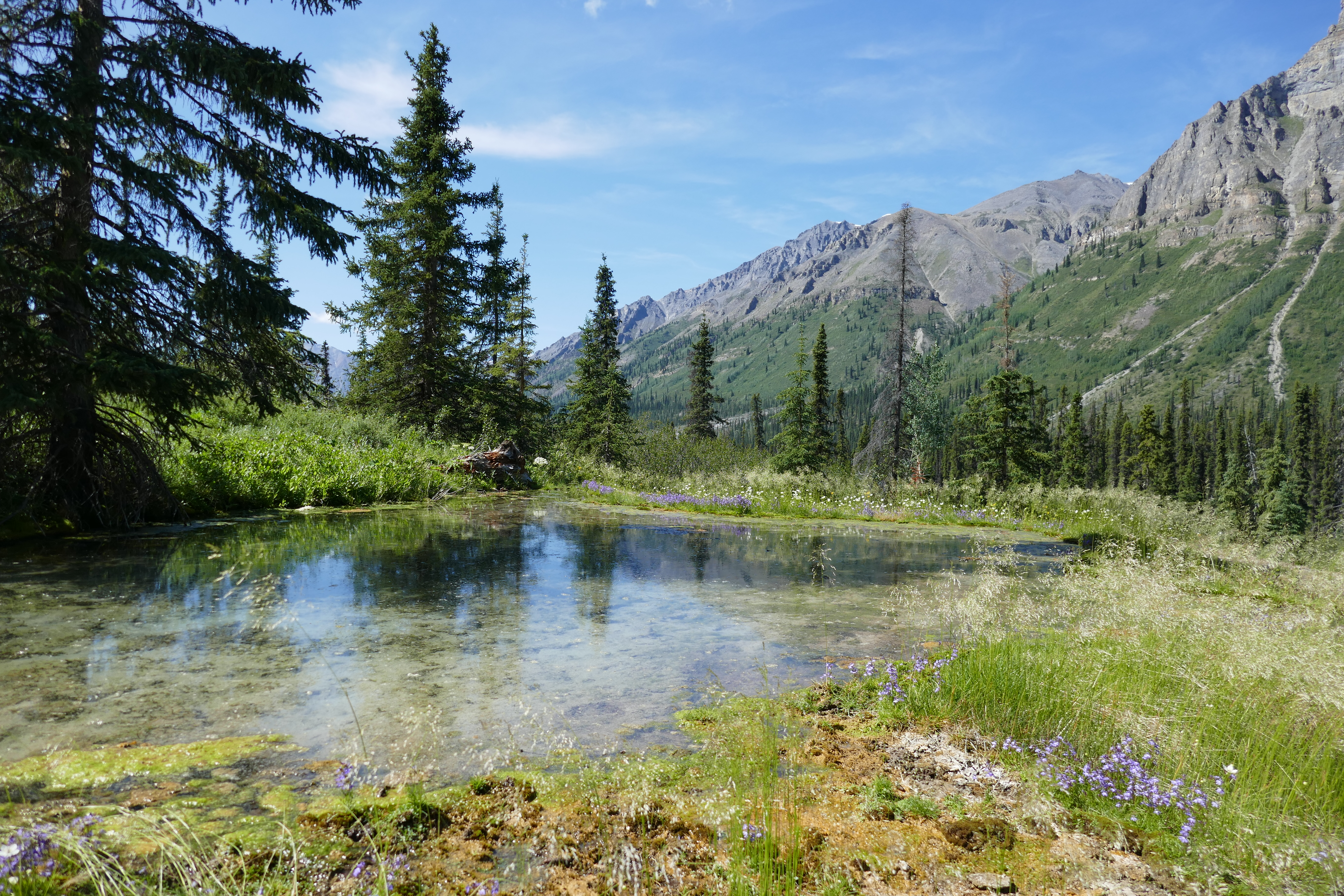
- Hot spring in Naats'ihch'oh National Park

- Ecoregion territory (in green)

Ecology
- Realm: Nearctic
- Biome: Tundra

Geography
- Area: 208,933 km^{2} (80,669 mi^{2})
- Country: Canada, United States
- Coordinates: 65°N 132°W

The Ogilvie–MacKenzie alpine tundra ecoregion (WWF ID: NA1116) covers the mountainous middle of the Yukon Territory in Canada, with extensions into the Northwest Territories. The vegetation is alpine and subalpine open forest of stunted spruce, fir and pine. The area is rugged but sections appear to have been unglaciated in the late Pleistocene and there are therefore relic species in the region. The area is remote and supports large, sustainable predator-prey systems.

== Location and description ==
The Yukon Ranges across central Yukon are towards the northern end of the North American Cordillera (chain of mountain ranges). From the northwest to the southeast the mountains of this ecoregion are the Ogilvie Mountains, the Wernecke Mountains Group, the Mackenzie Mountains, and the Selwyn Mountains.

The alpine regions of this region is situated between the lower elevation ecoregions - Northwest Territories taiga ecoregion to the north, and the Yukon Interior dry forests ecoregion to the south.

== Climate ==
The climate of the ecoregion is Tundra climate (Köppen climate classification ET), a local climate in which at least one month has an average temperature high enough to melt snow (0 °C (32 °F)), but no month with an average temperature in excess of 10 °C (50 °F). Temperatures in the region average 9 °C (48 °F) in the summer months, and −21.5 °C (−6.7 °F) in the winter.

Average precipitation ranges from 300 mm/year in the low elevations in the north to 750 mm/year in the higher elevations of the Selwyn Mountains of the southeast.

== Flora and fauna ==
The vegetation is alpine and subalpine. The ground cover is 23% low herbaceous cover, 19% shrub, 17% is closed evergreen forest, 11% is open forest, and 28% is bare or has sparse vegetation. The open forest is characterized by discontinuous stands of white spruce (Picea glauca), alpine fir (Abies lasiocarpa) and lodgepole pine (Pinus contorta). These are typically surrounded by lower willow (Salix spp.), dwarf birch (Betula spp.) and northern Labrador tea (Rhododendron subsect. Ledum).

There are extensive stands of paper birch (Betula papyrifera) in the north. The higher elevations see alpine tundra of lichens, mountain avens (Dryas octopetala), shrubs (Ericaceae), sedge (Carex spp.), and cottongrass (Eriophorum spp.).

Large mammals in the region include caribou (Rangifer tarandus), grizzly bear (Ursus arctos), brown bear (Ursus americanus), Dall's Sheep (Ovis dalli), moose (Alces alces), beaver (Castor canadensis), red fox (Vulpes vulpes), wolf (Canis lupus), and hare (Lepus spp.). There is also a bird population residing in the ecoregion.

== Protected areas ==
Over 10% of the ecoregion is officially protected. These protected areas include:

- Nahanni National Park Reserve
- Nááts'ihch'oh National Park Reserve
- Yukon–Charley Rivers National Preserve
- Tombstone Territorial Park
