= Geography of Quebec =

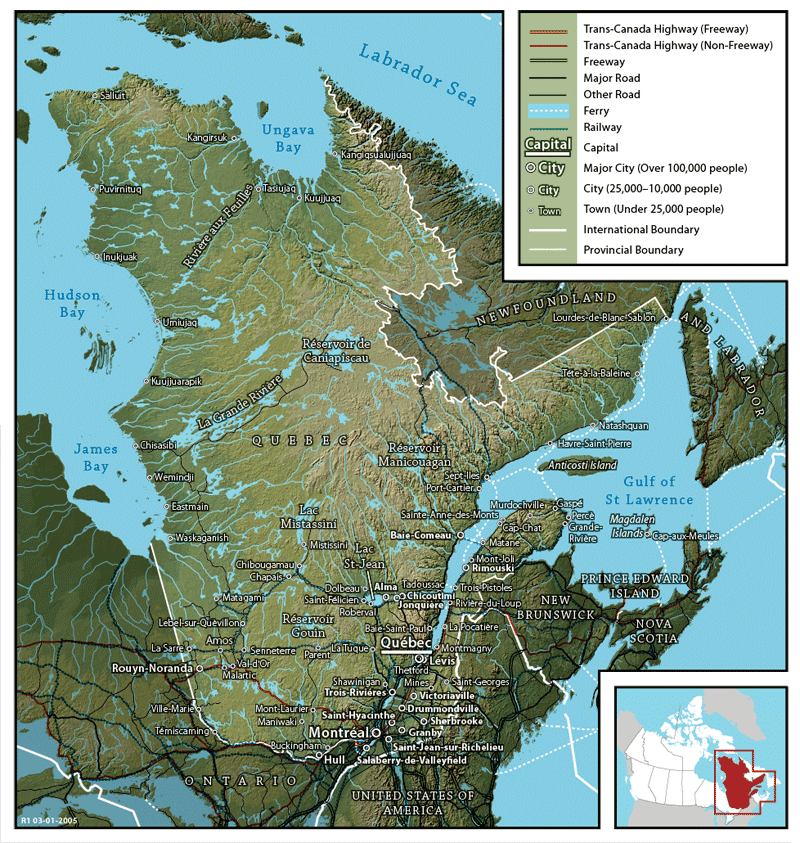
The Quebec territory.

Approximate areas of ecoregions: 1. Middle Arctic Tundra; 2. Low Arctic Tundra; 3. Torngat Mountain Tundra; 4. Eastern Canadian Shield Taiga; 5. Southern Hudson Bay Taiga; 6. Central Canadian Shield Forests; 7. Eastern Canadian Forests; 8. Eastern Forest/Boreal Transition; 9. Eastern Great Lakes Lowland Forests; 10. New England/Acadian Forests; 11. Gulf of St. Lawrence Lowland Forests

Located in the eastern part of Canada, Quebec occupies a territory nearly three times the size of France or Texas. It is much closer to the size of Alaska, covering 1.5 million square kilometres (0.58 million square miles), with borders more than 12,000 km (7,500 mi) long. It is the largest province in Canada and, by total area, the tenth-largest country subdivision in the world.

Most of Quebec is sparsely populated. Its most populous region is the Great Lakes–St. Lawrence Lowlands.

The combination of rich soils and the lowlands' relatively warm climate makes this valley its most prolific agricultural area. The rural landscape is divided into narrow rectangular tracts of land that extend from the river and date to the seigneurial system.

Quebec's topography is different from one region to another due to the varying composition of the ground, the climate, and the proximity to water. The Great Lakes–St. Lawrence Lowlands and the Appalachians are the two main topographic regions in southern Quebec, while the Canadian Shield occupies most of central and northern Quebec. 95% of the total, including the Labrador Peninsula, lies within the Canadian Shield. It is generally flat and exposed mountainous terrain interspersed with higher points such as the Laurentian Mountains in southern Quebec, the Otish Mountains in central Quebec and the Torngat Mountains near Ungava Bay. While low and medium altitude peaks extend from western Quebec to the far north, high altitude mountains appear in the Capitale-Nationale region to the east. Quebec's highest point at 1,652 metres (5,420 ft) is Mont d'Iberville, known in English as Mount Caubvick, in the northeastern part of the province in the Torngat Mountains. In the Labrador Peninsula portion of the Shield, the far northern region of Nunavik includes the Ungava Peninsula and consists of flat Arctic tundra inhabited mostly by Inuit.

Further south is the Eastern Canadian Shield taiga ecoregion and the Central Canadian Shield forests. The Appalachian region has a narrow strip of ancient mountains along the southeastern border of Quebec.

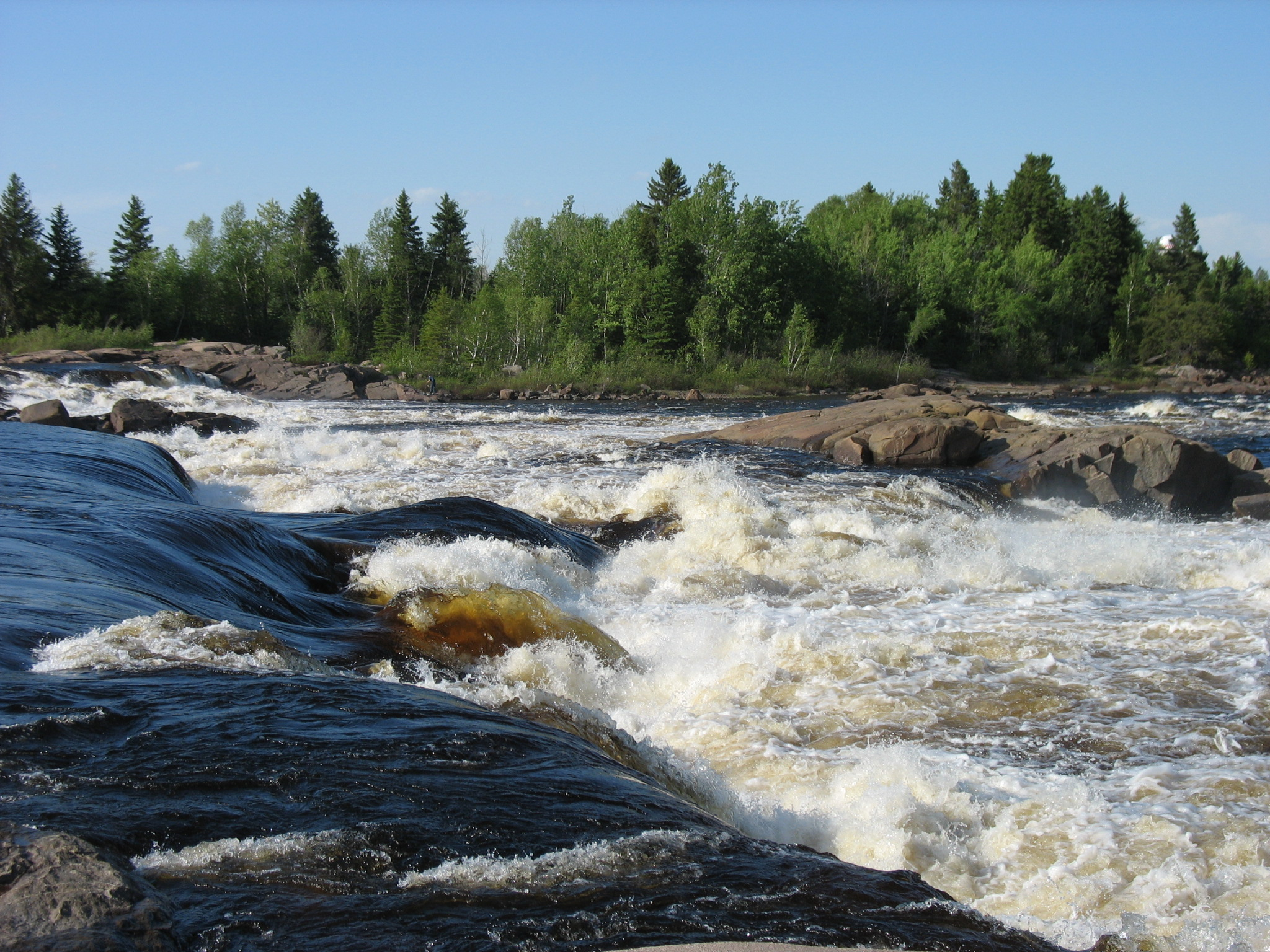
Michel's falls on Ashuapmushuan River in Saint-Félicien, Saguenay–Lac-Saint-Jean

Quebec has one of the world's largest reserves of fresh water, occupying 12% of its surface and representing 3% of the world's renewable fresh water. More than half a million lakes and 4,500 rivers empty into the Atlantic Ocean, through the Gulf of Saint Lawrence and the Arctic Ocean, by James, Hudson, and Ungava bays. The largest inland body of water is the Caniapiscau Reservoir; Lake Mistassini is the largest natural lake. The Saint Lawrence River has some of the world's largest sustaining inland Atlantic ports. Since 1959, the Saint Lawrence Seaway has provided a navigable link between the Atlantic Ocean and the Great Lakes.

The public lands of Quebec cover approximately 92% of its territory, including almost all of the water bodies. Protected areas can be classified into about twenty different legal designations (ex. exceptional forest ecosystem, protected marine environment, national park, biodiversity reserve, wildlife reserve, zone d'exploitation contrôlée (ZEC), etc.). More than 2,500 sites in Quebec today are protected areas. As of 2013, protected areas comprise 9.14% of Quebec's territory.

The ecological classification of Quebec territory established by the Ministry of Forests, Wildlife and Parks 2021, is presented in nine levels, it includes the diversity of terrestrial ecosystems throughout Quebec while taking into account both the characteristics of the vegetation (physiognomy, structure and composition) and the physical environment (relief, geology, geomorphology, hydrography).

The territory of Quebec is rich in resources in its coniferous forests, lakes, and rivers—pulp and paper, lumber, and hydroelectricity are some of the province's most important industries. The far north of the province, Nunavik, is subarctic or Arctic and is mostly inhabited by Inuit.

== Borders ==
Quebec is bordered by the province of Ontario, James Bay and Hudson Bay (including the circular Nastapoka arc) to the west, the provinces of New Brunswick and Newfoundland and Labrador to the east and Hudson Strait and Ungava Bay to the north. Its northernmost point is Cape Wolstenholme. Quebec also shares a land border with four northeast states of the United States (Maine, New Hampshire, New York and Vermont) to the south.

In 1927, the border between the Province of Quebec and the Dominion of Newfoundland was delineated by the British Judicial Committee of the Privy Council. The government of Quebec does not officially recognize the Newfoundland and Labrador–Quebec border. A border dispute remains regarding the ownership of Labrador. A maritime boundary also exists with the territories of Nunavut, Prince Edward Island and Nova Scotia. Quebec has officially more than 12,000 km (7,500 mi) of borders of all types. Half of these are land limits, 12% river limits and 38% marine limits.

== Topography ==
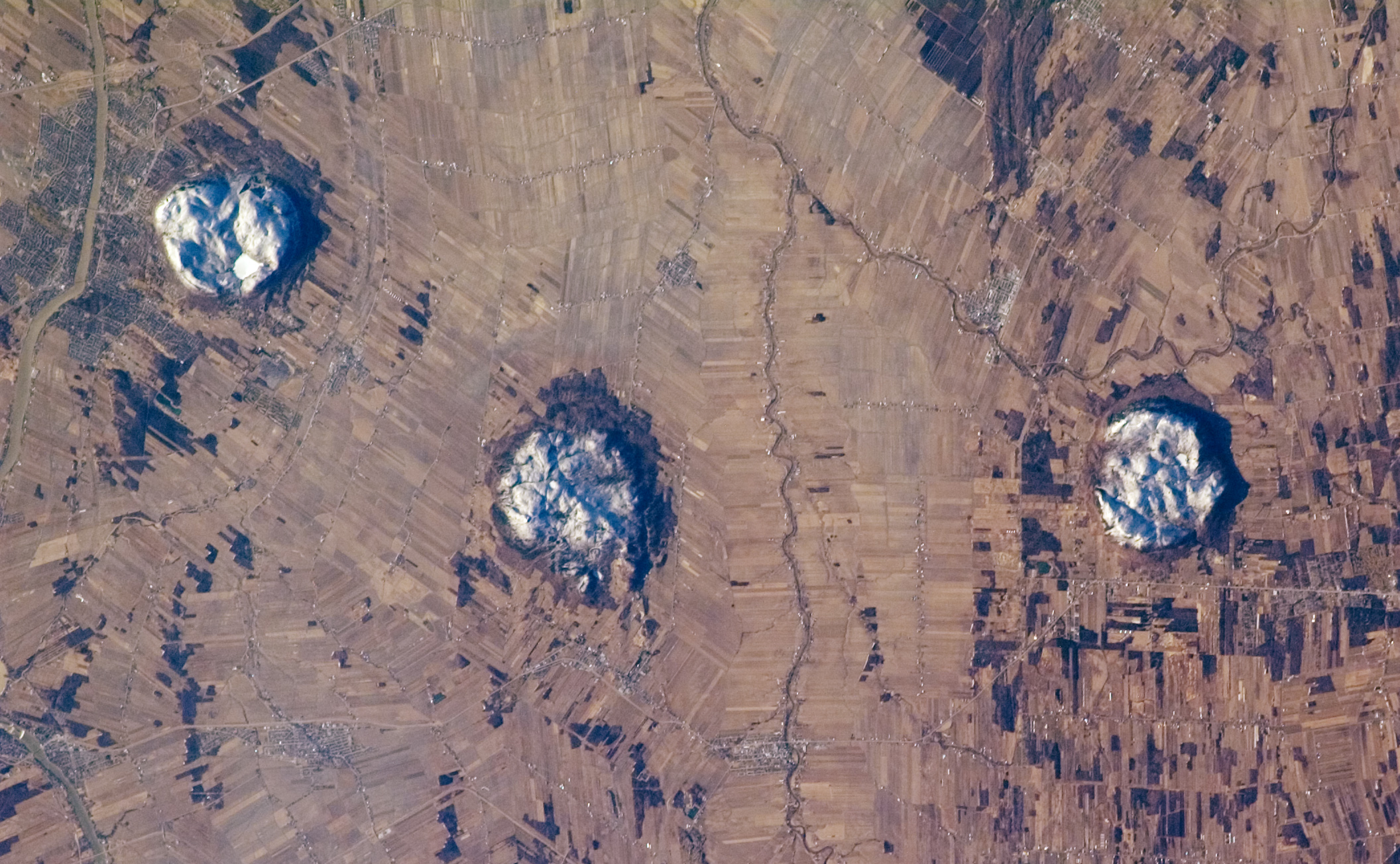
Satellite view of three Monteregian Hills (Saint Hilaire, Rougemont, and Yamaska) in Saint Lawrence Lowlands

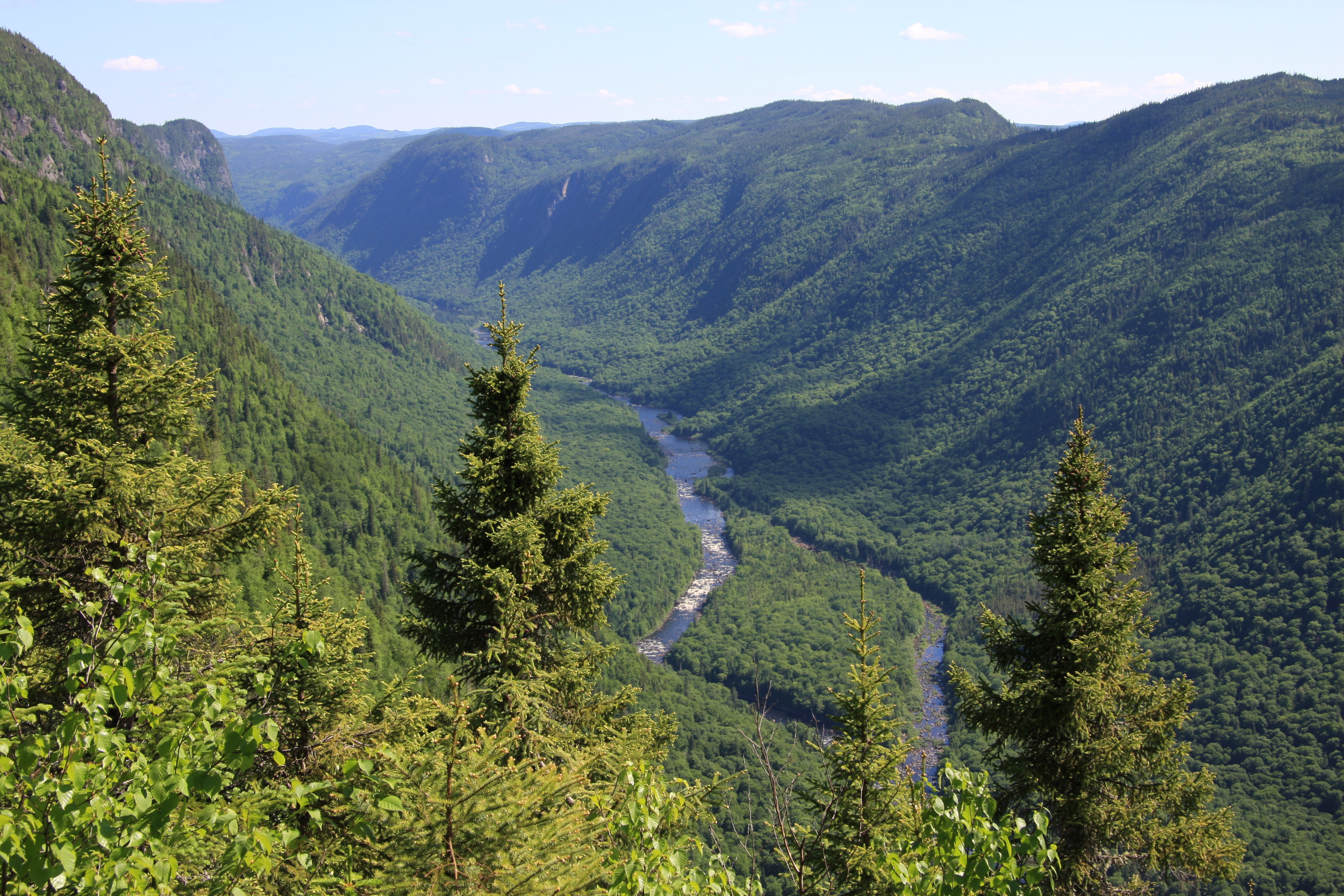
Jacques-Cartier River

Quebec's highest point at 1,652 m (5,420 ft) is Mont d'Iberville, known in English as Mount Caubvick, located on the border with Newfoundland and Labrador in the northeastern part of the province, in the Torngat Mountains. The most populous physiographic region is the Great Lakes–St. Lawrence Lowlands. It extends northeastward from the southwestern portion of the province along the shores of the Saint Lawrence River to the Quebec City region, limited to the North by the Laurentian Mountains and to the South by the Appalachians. It mainly covers the areas of the Centre-du-Québec, Laval, Montérégie and Montreal, the southern regions of the Capitale-Nationale, Lanaudière, Laurentides, Mauricie. It includes Anticosti Island, the Mingan Archipelago, and other small islands of the Gulf of St. Lawrence lowland forests ecoregion. Its landscape is low-lying and flat, except for isolated igneous outcrops near Montreal called the Monteregian Hills, formerly covered by the waters of Lake Champlain. The Oka hills also rise from the plain. Geologically, the lowlands formed as a rift valley about 100 million years ago and are prone to infrequent but significant earthquakes.son2" /> The most recent sedimentary rock layerswere formed as the seabed of the ancient Champlain Sea at the end of the last ice age about 14,000 years ago. The combination of rich and easily arable soils and Quebec's relatively warm climate makes this valley the most prolific agricultural area of Quebec province. Mixed forests provide most of Canada's springtime maple syrup crop. The rural part of the landscape is divided into narrow rectangular tracts of land that extend from the river and date back to settlement patterns in 17th century New France.

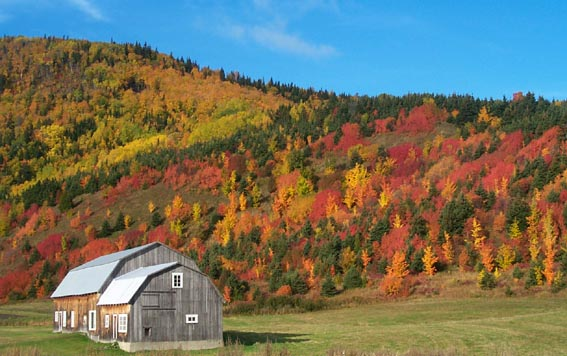
Autumn landscape of Haute-Gaspésie

More than 95% of Quebec's territory lies within the Canadian Shield. It is generally a quite flat and exposed mountainous terrain interspersed with higher points such as the Laurentian Mountains in southern Quebec, the Otish Mountains in central Quebec and the Torngat Mountains near Ungava Bay. The topography of the Shield has been shaped by glaciers from the successive ice ages, which explains the glacial deposits of boulders, gravel and sand, and by sea water and post-glacial lakes that left behind thick deposits of clay in parts of the Shield. The Canadian Shield also has a complex hydrological network of perhaps a million lakes, bogs, streams and rivers. It is rich in the forestry, mineral and hydro-electric resources that are a mainstay of the Quebec economy. Primary industries sustain small cities in regions of Abitibi-Témiscamingue, Saguenay–Lac-Saint-Jean, and Côte-Nord.

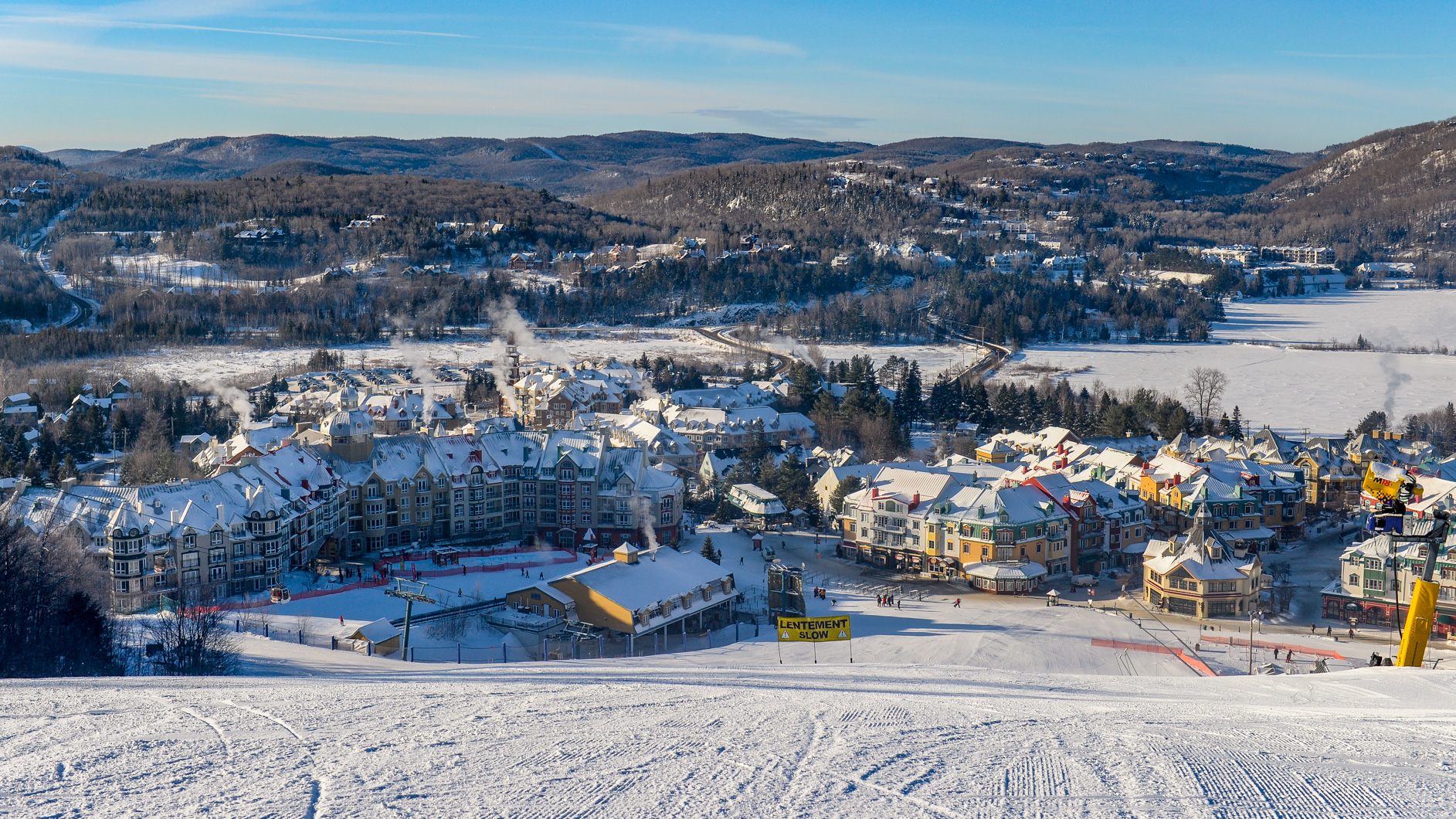
Mont Tremblant Resort, Laurentian Mountains

The Labrador Peninsula is covered by the Laurentian Plateau (or Canadian Shield), dotted with mountains such as Otish Mountains. The Ungava Peninsula is notably composed of D'Youville mountains, Puvirnituq mountains and Pingualuit crater. While low and medium altitude peak from western Quebec to the far north, high altitudes mountains emerge in the Capitale-Nationale region to the extreme east, along its longitude. In the Labrador Peninsula portion of the Shield, the far northern region of Nunavik includes the Ungava Peninsula and consists of flat Arctic tundra inhabited mostly by the Inuit. Further south lie the subarctic taiga of the Eastern Canadian Shield taiga ecoregion and the boreal forest of the Central Canadian Shield forests, where spruce, fir, and poplar trees provide raw materials for Quebec's pulp and paper and lumber industries. Although the area is inhabited principally by the Cree, Naskapi, and Innu First Nations, thousands of temporary workers reside at Radisson to service the massive James Bay Hydroelectric Project on the La Grande and Eastmain rivers. The southern portion of the shield extends to the Laurentians, a mountain range just north of the Great Lakes–St. Lawrence Lowlands, that attracts local and international tourists to ski hills and lakeside resorts.

The Appalachian region of Quebec has a narrow strip of ancient mountains along the southeastern border of Quebec. The Appalachians are actually a huge chain that extends from Alabama to Newfoundland. In between, it covers in Quebec near 800 km (500 mi), from the Montérégie hills to the Gaspé Peninsula. In western Quebec, the average altitude is about 500 m (1,600 ft), while in the Gaspé Peninsula, the Appalachian peaks (especially the Chic-Choc) are among the highest in Quebec, exceeding 1,000 m (3,300 ft).

== Hydrography ==
Quebec has several notable islands, namely the numerous islands of the Hochelaga Archipelago that includes the Island of Montreal and Îles Laval which make up full or parts of the major cities of Montreal and Laval. Île d'Orléans near Quebec City, the sparsely populated Anticosti Island in the outlet of the Saint Lawrence River, and the Magdalen Islands archipelago in the Gulf of Saint Lawrence are other noteworthy islands.

Quebec has one of the world's largest reserves of fresh water, occupying 12% of its surface. It has 3% of the world's renewable fresh water, whereas it has only 0.1% of its population. More than half a million lakes, including 30 with an area greater than 250 km^{2} (97 sq mi), and 4,500 rivers drain into the Atlantic Ocean, through the Gulf of Saint Lawrence and the Arctic Ocean, by James, Hudson, and Ungava bays. The largest inland body of water is the Caniapiscau Reservoir, created in the realization of the James Bay Project to produce hydroelectric power. Lake Mistassini is the largest natural lake in Quebec. Central Quebec contains the Manicouagan Reservoir, which surrounds René-Levasseur Island at the center formed by an asteroid impact of about 5 km (3.1 mi) across roughly 214 million years ago. It was created in the 1960s for hydroelectric power. The reservoir spans 72 km (45 mi) east to west and is drained by the Manicouagan River.

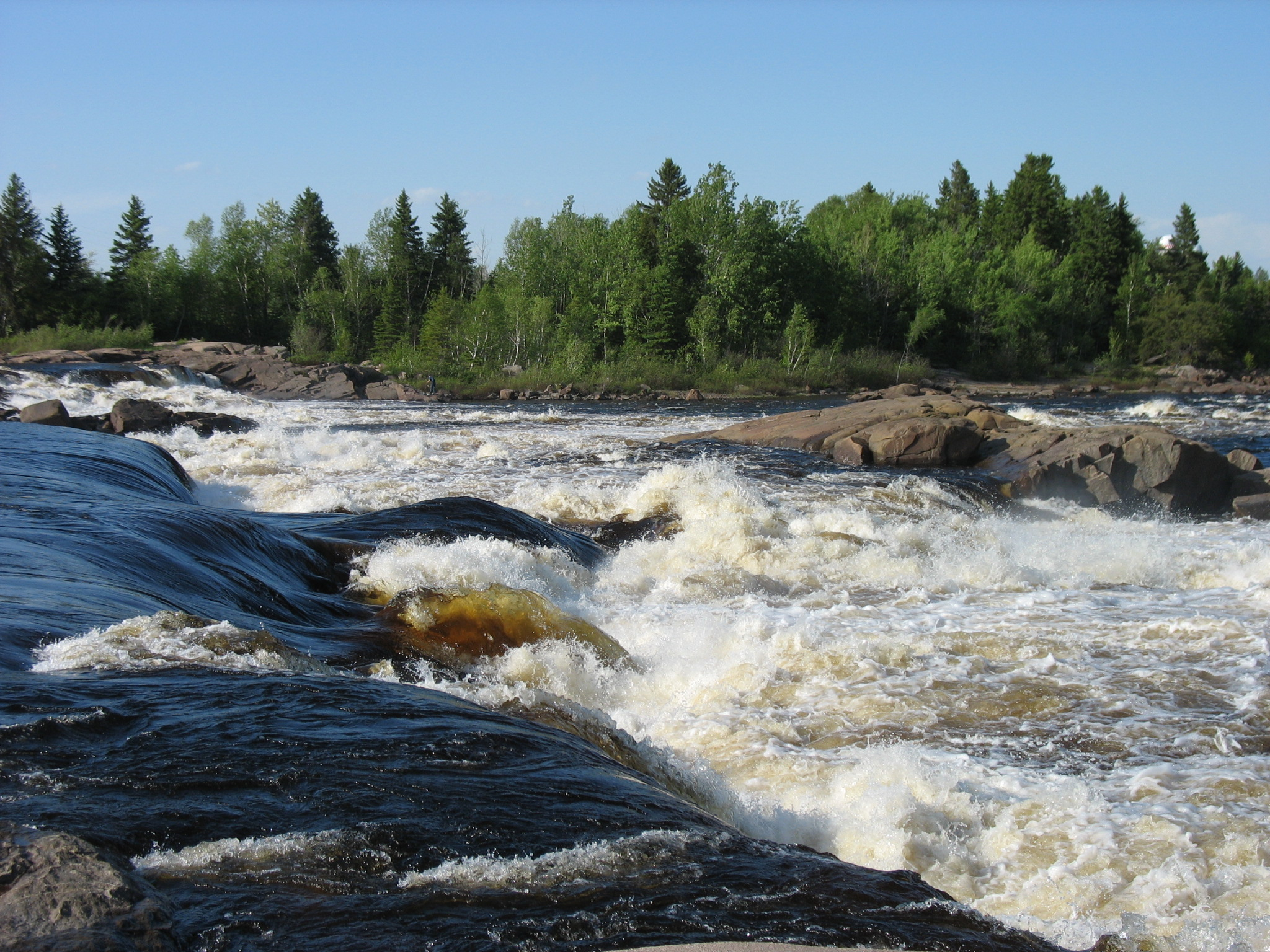
Michel's falls on Ashuapmushuan River in Saint-Félicien, Saguenay–Lac-Saint-Jean

The Saint Lawrence River has some of the world's largest sustaining inland Atlantic ports at Montreal (the province's largest city), Trois-Rivières, and Quebec City (the capital). Its access to the Atlantic Ocean and the interior of North America made it the base of early French exploration and settlement in the 17th and 18th centuries. Since 1959, the Saint Lawrence Seaway has provided a navigable link between the Atlantic Ocean and the Great Lakes. Northeast of Quebec City, the river broadens into the world's largest estuary, the feeding site of numerous species of whales, fish, and seabirds. The river empties into the Gulf of Saint Lawrence. This marine environment sustains fisheries and smaller ports in the Lower Saint Lawrence (Bas-Saint-Laurent), Lower North Shore (Côte-Nord), and Gaspé (Gaspésie) regions of the province. The Saint Lawrence River with its estuary forms the basis of Quebec's development through the centuries. Other notable rivers include the Ashuapmushuan, Chaudière, Gatineau, Manicouagan, Ottawa, Richelieu, Rupert, Saguenay, Saint-François, and Saint-Maurice.

== Climate ==
Köppen climate types of Quebec

In general, the climate of Quebec is cold and humid. The climate of the province is largely determined by its latitude, maritime and elevation influences. According to the Köppen climate classification, Quebec has three main climate regions. Southern and western Quebec, including most of the major population centres and areas south of 51^{o}N, have a humid continental climate (Köppen climate classification Dfb) with four distinct seasons having warm to occasionally hot and humid summers and often cold and snowy winters.

The main climatic influences are from western and northern Canada and move eastward, and from the southern and central United States that move northward. Because of the influence of both storm systems from the core of North America and the Atlantic Ocean, precipitation is abundant throughout the year, with most areas receiving more than 1,000 mm (39 in) of precipitation, including over 300 cm (120 in) of snow in many areas. During the summer, severe weather patterns (such as tornadoes and severe thunderstorms) occur occasionally. Most of central Quebec, ranging from 51 to 58 degrees North has a subarctic climate (Köppen Dfc). Winters are long, cold, and snowy, and among the coldest in eastern Canada, while summers are warm but short due to the higher latitude and the greater influence of Arctic air masses. Precipitation is also somewhat less than farther south, except at some of the higher elevations. The northern regions of Quebec have an arctic climate (Köppen ET), with cold winters and short, much cooler summers. The primary influences in this region are the Arctic Ocean currents (such as the Labrador Current) and continental air masses from the High Arctic.

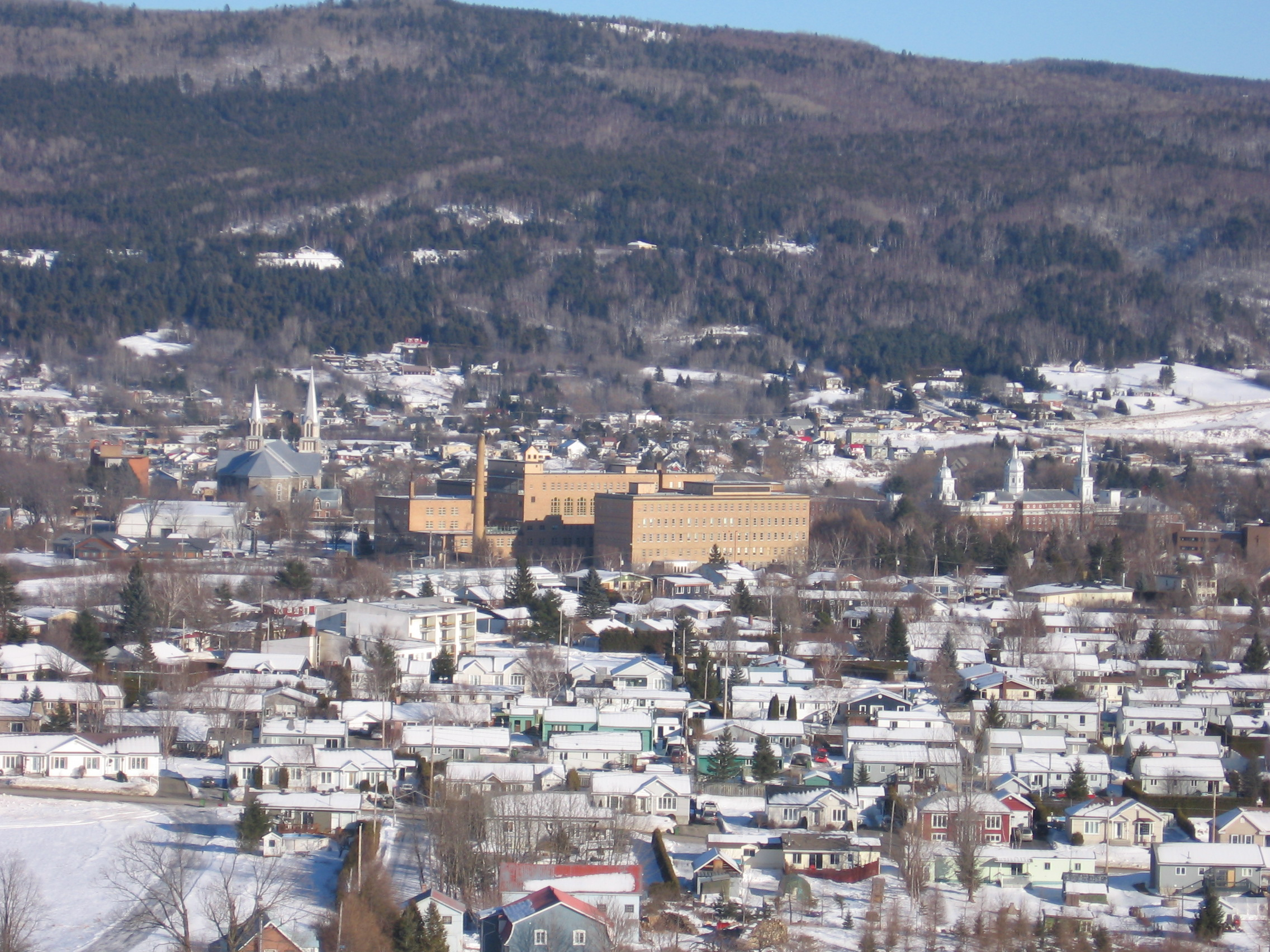
Baie-Saint-Paul during winter

The four calendar seasons in Quebec are spring, summer, autumn and winter, with conditions differing by region. They are then differentiated according to the insolation, temperature, and precipitation of snow and rain. In Quebec City, the length of the daily sunshine varies from 8:37 hrs in December to 15:50 hrs in June; the annual variation is much greater (from 4:54 to 19:29 hrs) at the northern tip of the province. From temperate zones to the northern territories of the Far North, the brightness varies with latitude, as well as the Northern Lights and midnight sun.

Quebec is divided into four climatic zones: arctic, subarctic, humid continental and East maritime. From south to north, average temperatures range in summer between 25 and 5 °C (77 and 41 °F) and, in winter, between −10 and −25 °C (14 and −13 °F). In periods of intense heat and cold, temperatures can reach 35 °C (95 °F) in the summer and −40 °C (−40 °F) during the Quebec winter, They may vary depending on the Humidex or Wind chill. The all time record high was 40.0 °C (104.0 °F) and the all time record low was −51.0 °C (−59.8 °F).

The all-time record of the greatest precipitation in winter was established in winter 2007–2008, with more than five metres of snow in the area of Quebec City, while the average amount received per winter is around three metres. March 1971, however, saw the "Century's Snowstorm" with more than 40 cm (16 in) in Montreal to 80 cm (31 in) in Mont Apica of snow within 24 hours in many regions of southern Quebec. Also, the winter of 2010 was the warmest and driest recorded in more than 60 years.

Quebec is divided into four climatic zones: arctic, subarctic, humid continental and East maritime. From south to north, average temperatures range in summer between 25 and 5 °C (77 and 41 °F) and, in winter, between −10 and −25 °C (14 and −13 °F). In periods of intense heat and cold, temperatures can reach 35 °C (95 °F) in the summer and −40 °C (−40 °F) during the Quebec winter, Most of central Quebec, ranging from 51 to 58 degrees North has a subarctic climate (Köppen Dfc). Winters are long, cold, and snowy, and among the coldest in eastern Canada, while summers are warm but short due to the higher latitude and the greater influence of Arctic air masses. Precipitation is also somewhat less than farther south, except at some of the higher elevations. The northern regions of Quebec have an arctic climate (Köppen ET), with cold winters and short, much cooler summers. The primary influences in this region are the Arctic Ocean currents (such as the Labrador Current) and continental air masses from the High Arctic.

The all-time record high temperature was 40.0 °C (104.0 °F) and the all-time record low was −51.0 °C (−59.8 °F). The all-time record of the greatest precipitation in winter was established in winter 2007–2008, with more than five metres of snow in the area of Quebec City. March 1971, however, saw the "Century's Snowstorm" with more than 40 cm (16 in) in Montreal to 80 cm (31 in) in Mont Apica of snow within 24 hours in many regions of southern Quebec. The winter of 2010 was the warmest and driest recorded in more than 60 years.

Average daily maximum and minimum temperatures for selected locations in Quebec
Location	July (°C)	July (°F)	January (°C)	January (°F)
Montreal	26/16	79/61	−5/−14	22/7
Gatineau	26/15	79/60	−6/−15	21/5
Quebec City	25/13	77/56	−8/−18	17/0
Trois-Rivières	25/14	78/58	−7/−17	19/1
Sherbrooke	24/11	76/53	−6/−18	21/0
Saguenay	24/12	75/54	−10/−21	14/−6
Matagami	23/9	73/48	−13/−26	8/−16
Kuujjuaq	17/6	63/43	−20/−29	−4/−20
Inukjuak	13/5	56/42	−21/−28	−6/−19

=== Climate tables ===
Climate data for Montreal (Montréal–Trudeau International Airport) WMO ID: 71627; coordinates 45°28′N 73°45′W; elevation: 36 m (118 ft); 1991−2020 normals, extremes 1941−present
Month	Jan	Feb	Mar	Apr	May	Jun	Jul	Aug	Sep	Oct	Nov	Dec	Year
Record high humidex	13.5	14.7	28.0	33.8	40.9	45.0	45.8	46.8	42.8	34.1	26	18.1	46.8
Record high °C (°F)	13.9 (57.0)	15.1 (59.2)	25.8 (78.4)	30.0 (86.0)	36.6 (97.9)	35.0 (95.0)	36.1 (97.0)	37.6 (99.7)	33.5 (92.3)	28.3 (82.9)	24.3 (75.7)	18.0 (64.4)	37.6 (99.7)
Mean maximum °C (°F)	7.1 (44.8)	6.7 (44.1)	13.5 (56.3)	23.3 (73.9)	29.3 (84.7)	31.4 (88.5)	32.4 (90.3)	31.5 (88.7)	29.4 (84.9)	23.2 (73.8)	17.0 (62.6)	10.0 (50.0)	33.2 (91.8)
Mean daily maximum °C (°F)	−5.0 (23.0)	−3.4 (25.9)	2.4 (36.3)	11.3 (52.3)	19.4 (66.9)	24.2 (75.6)	26.7 (80.1)	25.7 (78.3)	21.1 (70.0)	13.2 (55.8)	6.1 (43.0)	−1.2 (29.8)	11.7 (53.1)
Daily mean °C (°F)	−9.2 (15.4)	−8.0 (17.6)	−2.0 (28.4)	6.2 (43.2)	13.9 (57.0)	19.0 (66.2)	21.7 (71.1)	20.6 (69.1)	16.0 (60.8)	8.9 (48.0)	2.3 (36.1)	−5.0 (23.0)	7.0 (44.6)
Mean daily minimum °C (°F)	−13.5 (7.7)	−12.4 (9.7)	−6.5 (20.3)	1.1 (34.0)	8.3 (46.9)	13.8 (56.8)	16.7 (62.1)	15.6 (60.1)	10.9 (51.6)	4.5 (40.1)	−1.7 (28.9)	−8.7 (16.3)	2.3 (36.1)
Mean minimum °C (°F)	−25.3 (−13.5)	−22.6 (−8.7)	−18.2 (−0.8)	−6.3 (20.7)	1.2 (34.2)	6.8 (44.2)	11.2 (52.2)	9.1 (48.4)	3.4 (38.1)	−3.0 (26.6)	−10.4 (13.3)	−20.6 (−5.1)	−26.3 (−15.3)
Record low °C (°F)	−37.8 (−36.0)	−33.9 (−29.0)	−29.4 (−20.9)	−15.0 (5.0)	−4.4 (24.1)	0.0 (32.0)	6.1 (43.0)	3.3 (37.9)	−2.2 (28.0)	−7.2 (19.0)	−19.4 (−2.9)	−32.4 (−26.3)	−37.8 (−36.0)
Record low wind chill	−49.1	−46.0	−42.9	−26.3	−9.9	0.0	0.0	0.0	−4.8	−11.6	−30.7	−46.0	−49.1
Average precipitation mm (inches)	85.8 (3.38)	65.5 (2.58)	77.2 (3.04)	90.0 (3.54)	85.6 (3.37)	83.6 (3.29)	91.1 (3.59)	93.6 (3.69)	89.2 (3.51)	103.1 (4.06)	84.2 (3.31)	91.9 (3.62)	1,040.8 (40.98)
Average rainfall mm (inches)	32.8 (1.29)	16.9 (0.67)	37.3 (1.47)	74.9 (2.95)	85.6 (3.37)	83.6 (3.29)	91.2 (3.59)	93.6 (3.69)	89.2 (3.51)	101.6 (4.00)	67.4 (2.65)	44.2 (1.74)	818.3 (32.22)
Average snowfall cm (inches)	52.0 (20.5)	47.1 (18.5)	37.1 (14.6)	14.8 (5.8)	0.0 (0.0)	0.0 (0.0)	0.0 (0.0)	0.0 (0.0)	0.0 (0.0)	1.1 (0.4)	16.3 (6.4)	48.2 (19.0)	216.6 (85.3)
Average precipitation days (≥ 0.2 mm)	17.1	13.7	13.7	12.4	13.8	12.9	12.8	11.2	11.3	13.5	14.3	16.8	163.3
Average rainy days (≥ 0.2 mm)	4.5	3.8	7.0	11.4	13.7	12.9	12.8	11.2	11.3	13.2	11.1	6.7	119.6
Average snowy days (≥ 0.2 cm)	15.4	12.4	9.0	3.0	0.04	0.0	0.0	0.0	0.0	0.63	4.8	12.8	58.2
Average relative humidity (%) (at 1500 LST)	68.1	63.0	57.8	50.7	49.8	53.6	55.5	56.1	58.2	61.4	66.4	71.9	59.4
Average dew point °C (°F)	−13.0 (8.6)	−12.2 (10.0)	−7.6 (18.3)	−1.5 (29.3)	6.0 (42.8)	12.2 (54.0)	15.4 (59.7)	14.9 (58.8)	11.1 (52.0)	4.4 (39.9)	−1.8 (28.8)	−8.0 (17.6)	1.7 (35.1)
Mean monthly sunshine hours	101.2	127.8	164.3	178.3	228.9	240.3	271.5	246.3	182.2	143.5	83.6	83.6	2,051.3
Percentage possible sunshine	35.7	43.7	44.6	44.0	49.6	51.3	57.3	56.3	48.3	42.2	29.2	30.7	44.4
Average ultraviolet index	1	2	3	5	6	7	7	7	5	3	1	1	4
Source 1: Environment and Climate Change Canada (sun 1981–2010) (November maximum) (November humidex) and Weather Atlas (UV index)
Source 2: weatherstats.ca (for dewpoint and monthly/yearly average absolute maximum/minimum temperature)

Climate data for Sainte-Foy, Quebec City (Québec City Jean Lesage International Airport) WMO ID: 71708; coordinates 46°48′N 71°23′W; elevation: 74.4 m (244 ft); 1991–2020 normals, extremes 1875–present (Note: Based on station coordinates provided by Environment and Climate Change Canada, climate data was recorded in the area of Old Quebec from August 1875 to February 1959, and at Québec City Jean Lesage International Airport from March 1943 to present.)
Month	Jan	Feb	Mar	Apr	May	Jun	Jul	Aug	Sep	Oct	Nov	Dec	Year
Record high humidex	10.6	11.7	19.9	32.9	40.3	44.1	49.2	49.3	40.1	30.9	24.9	14.6	49.3
Record high °C (°F)	17.7 (63.9)	12.0 (53.6)	18.3 (64.9)	29.9 (85.8)	33.1 (91.6)	34.2 (93.6)	35.6 (96.1)	34.4 (93.9)	33.9 (93.0)	28.3 (82.9)	22.9 (73.2)	13.9 (57.0)	35.6 (96.1)
Mean maximum °C (°F)	4.6 (40.3)	4.6 (40.3)	9.5 (49.1)	19.9 (67.8)	28.0 (82.4)	30.4 (86.7)	31.1 (88.0)	30.0 (86.0)	27.1 (80.8)	20.8 (69.4)	14.6 (58.3)	6.2 (43.2)	31.9 (89.4)
Mean daily maximum °C (°F)	−7.1 (19.2)	−5.0 (23.0)	0.4 (32.7)	8.3 (46.9)	17.5 (63.5)	22.5 (72.5)	25.0 (77.0)	24.0 (75.2)	19.1 (66.4)	11.3 (52.3)	3.6 (38.5)	−3.3 (26.1)	9.7 (49.5)
Daily mean °C (°F)	−11.9 (10.6)	−10.4 (13.3)	−4.5 (23.9)	3.5 (38.3)	11.6 (52.9)	16.7 (62.1)	19.5 (67.1)	18.4 (65.1)	13.7 (56.7)	6.8 (44.2)	−0.1 (31.8)	−7.3 (18.9)	4.7 (40.5)
Mean daily minimum °C (°F)	−16.7 (1.9)	−15.7 (3.7)	−9.3 (15.3)	−1.2 (29.8)	5.6 (42.1)	10.8 (51.4)	13.9 (57.0)	12.8 (55.0)	8.3 (46.9)	2.4 (36.3)	−3.8 (25.2)	−11.4 (11.5)	−0.4 (31.3)
Mean minimum °C (°F)	−29.3 (−20.7)	−27.2 (−17.0)	−22.4 (−8.3)	−9.0 (15.8)	−1.2 (29.8)	4.6 (40.3)	8.4 (47.1)	6.7 (44.1)	0.8 (33.4)	−4.6 (23.7)	−13.6 (7.5)	−24.3 (−11.7)	−30.4 (−22.7)
Record low °C (°F)	−36.7 (−34.1)	−36.1 (−33.0)	−32.6 (−26.7)	−19.3 (−2.7)	−7.8 (18.0)	−1.3 (29.7)	3.9 (39.0)	2.2 (36.0)	−4.8 (23.4)	−10.0 (14.0)	−24.0 (−11.2)	−33.4 (−28.1)	−36.7 (−34.1)
Record low wind chill	−51.1	−52.4	−41.0	−29.0	−13.6	−1.7	0.0	0.0	−7.8	−17.3	−30.8	−48.4	−52.4
Average precipitation mm (inches)	86.7 (3.41)	65.7 (2.59)	77.7 (3.06)	94.4 (3.72)	91.8 (3.61)	114.7 (4.52)	118.7 (4.67)	108.7 (4.28)	111.3 (4.38)	115.8 (4.56)	90.9 (3.58)	96.2 (3.79)	1,172.6 (46.17)
Average rainfall mm (inches)	24.6 (0.97)	13.8 (0.54)	30.2 (1.19)	71.3 (2.81)	—	—	—	—	—	—	61.7 (2.43)	33.7 (1.33)	—
Average snowfall cm (inches)	69.1 (27.2)	64.3 (25.3)	50.3 (19.8)	13.1 (5.2)	—	—	—	—	—	—	25.6 (10.1)	75.7 (29.8)	—
Average precipitation days (≥ 0.2 mm)	18.2	14.7	14.0	13.7	13.6	13.5	14.7	13.0	12.3	14.9	14.9	18.5	175.9
Average rainy days (≥ 0.2 mm)	3.3	2.2	4.3	10.3	—	—	—	—	—	—	9.5	4.4	—
Average snowy days (≥ 0.2 cm)	15.4	13.2	10.2	4	—	—	—	—	—	—	7.0	16.5	—
Average relative humidity (%) (at 1500 LST)	70.0	65.5	61.1	56.5	52.2	56.9	59.3	60.1	62.7	65.4	70.6	75.1	63.0
Average dew point °C (°F)	−15.2 (4.6)	−14.1 (6.6)	−9.0 (15.8)	−2.7 (27.1)	4.7 (40.5)	11.0 (51.8)	14.6 (58.3)	13.9 (57.0)	9.9 (49.8)	3.1 (37.6)	−3.3 (26.1)	−9.9 (14.2)	0.3 (32.5)
Mean monthly sunshine hours	98.9	121.2	152.0	170.6	211.1	234.7	252.3	232.0	163.0	122.0	76.6	81.9	1,916.3
Percentage possible sunshine	35.5	41.8	41.3	41.9	45.3	49.6	52.7	52.7	43.1	36.0	27.1	30.7	41.5
Average ultraviolet index	1	2	3	4	6	7	7	6	5	3	1	1	4
Source 1: Environment and Climate Change Canada (sun 1981–2010) (extremes 1875–1959} and Weather Atlas (UV index)
Source 2: weatherstats.ca (for dewpoint and monthly/yearly average absolute maximum/minimum temperature)

Climate data for Trois-Rivières WMO ID: 71724; coordinates 46°21′13″N 72°30′58″W; elevation: 6 m (20 ft); 1991−2020 normals, extremes 1920−present (Note: Climate data was recorded at Cap-de-la-Madeleine from December 1920 to April 1932 and at Trois-Rivières from November 1934 to present.)
Month	Jan	Feb	Mar	Apr	May	Jun	Jul	Aug	Sep	Oct	Nov	Dec	Year
Record high humidex	11.7	8.7	15.6	26.8	35.6	41.2	44.7	43.3	37.7	30.1	21.3	12.7	44.7
Record high °C (°F)	12.0 (53.6)	9.3 (48.7)	16.1 (61.0)	25.4 (77.7)	31.5 (88.7)	34.0 (93.2)	37.8 (100.0)	32.3 (90.1)	30.8 (87.4)	24.8 (76.6)	18.9 (66.0)	12.8 (55.0)	37.8 (100.0)
Mean daily maximum °C (°F)	−5.6 (21.9)	−3.9 (25.0)	1.2 (34.2)	8.8 (47.8)	17.3 (63.1)	22.5 (72.5)	25.1 (77.2)	24.1 (75.4)	19.8 (67.6)	12.2 (54.0)	4.9 (40.8)	−2.0 (28.4)	10.4 (50.7)
Daily mean °C (°F)	−9.9 (14.2)	−8.5 (16.7)	−3.1 (26.4)	4.6 (40.3)	12.6 (54.7)	18.1 (64.6)	20.9 (69.6)	19.9 (67.8)	15.5 (59.9)	8.5 (47.3)	1.8 (35.2)	−5.3 (22.5)	6.2 (43.2)
Mean daily minimum °C (°F)	−14.1 (6.6)	−13.1 (8.4)	−7.3 (18.9)	0.3 (32.5)	7.9 (46.2)	13.6 (56.5)	16.7 (62.1)	15.6 (60.1)	11.0 (51.8)	5.1 (41.2)	−1.3 (29.7)	−8.6 (16.5)	2.1 (35.8)
Record low °C (°F)	−32.3 (−26.1)	−41.7 (−43.1)	−26.4 (−15.5)	−15.6 (3.9)	−1.3 (29.7)	3.8 (38.8)	9.0 (48.2)	6.7 (44.1)	0.9 (33.6)	−4.9 (23.2)	−18.3 (−0.9)	−30.6 (−23.1)	−41.7 (−43.1)
Record low wind chill	−42.3	−39.6	−38.6	−25.9	−5.9	0.0	0.0	0.0	0.0	−10.4	−25.0	−35.5	−42.3
Average precipitation mm (inches)	83.1 (3.27)	65.9 (2.59)	76.3 (3.00)	87.3 (3.44)	83.4 (3.28)	104.5 (4.11)	124.5 (4.90)	95.7 (3.77)	96.9 (3.81)	100.5 (3.96)	88.0 (3.46)	94.7 (3.73)	1,100.7 (43.33)
Average rainfall mm (inches)	30.3 (1.19)	16.1 (0.63)	29.4 (1.16)	69.7 (2.74)	89.3 (3.52)	104.8 (4.13)	133.1 (5.24)	103.1 (4.06)	96.5 (3.80)	99.2 (3.91)	68.2 (2.69)	32.8 (1.29)	872.5 (34.35)
Average snowfall cm (inches)	60.8 (23.9)	53.0 (20.9)	50.0 (19.7)	14.1 (5.6)	0.1 (0.0)	0.0 (0.0)	0.0 (0.0)	0.0 (0.0)	0.0 (0.0)	3.5 (1.4)	24.4 (9.6)	68.6 (27.0)	274.4 (108.0)
Average precipitation days (≥ 0.2 mm)	13.8	11.3	11.6	11.6	13.2	13.3	15.5	11.5	11.7	14.2	13.5	14.8	156
Average rainy days (≥ 0.2 mm)	3.4	2.3	5.4	10.4	14.1	14.2	16.3	12.8	12.4	14.6	10.1	4.1	120.1
Average snowy days (≥ 0.2 cm)	12.9	10.2	7.5	2.8	0.06	0.0	0.0	0.0	0.0	0.63	5.8	11.7	51.6
Average relative humidity (%) (at 1500 LST)	73.7	68.8	63.8	59.2	57.4	62.6	64.4	63.2	64.0	65.6	70.4	75.9	65.8
Mean monthly sunshine hours	84.5	110.4	157.3	166.9	208.7	220.9	257.9	205.3	158.2	121.3	69.3	62.2	1,823.1
Percentage possible sunshine	30.1	37.9	42.7	41.1	45.0	46.9	54.1	46.8	41.9	35.8	24.4	23.1	39.1
Source: Environment and Climate Change Canada (July maximum) (February minimum) Sunshine data recorded at Nicolet

Climate data for Baie-Comeau (Baie-Comeau Airport) Climate ID: 7040440; coordinates 49°08′N 68°12′W; elevation: 21.6 m (71 ft); WMO ID: 71890; 1991–2020 normals, extremes 1947–present
Month	Jan	Feb	Mar	Apr	May	Jun	Jul	Aug	Sep	Oct	Nov	Dec	Year
Record high humidex	8.8	8.4	15.3	21.7	30.4	39.1	39.2	46.3	33.2	31.8	20.2	11.6	46.3
Record high °C (°F)	11.4 (52.5)	8.2 (46.8)	11.4 (52.5)	21.8 (71.2)	30.0 (86.0)	31.8 (89.2)	32.8 (91.0)	31.1 (88.0)	28.6 (83.5)	22.6 (72.7)	18.1 (64.6)	11.1 (52.0)	32.8 (91.0)
Mean maximum °C (°F)	2.5 (36.5)	2.4 (36.3)	7.2 (45.0)	13.1 (55.6)	22.2 (72.0)	26.7 (80.1)	27.8 (82.0)	27.3 (81.1)	23.5 (74.3)	16.8 (62.2)	10.6 (51.1)	5.0 (41.0)	28.7 (83.7)
Mean daily maximum °C (°F)	−8.0 (17.6)	−6.7 (19.9)	−1.6 (29.1)	4.6 (40.3)	12.3 (54.1)	18.3 (64.9)	21.3 (70.3)	20.7 (69.3)	15.8 (60.4)	9.0 (48.2)	2.5 (36.5)	−4.0 (24.8)	7.0 (44.6)
Daily mean °C (°F)	−13.4 (7.9)	−12.4 (9.7)	−6.7 (19.9)	0.6 (33.1)	7.2 (45.0)	12.8 (55.0)	16.0 (60.8)	15.3 (59.5)	10.6 (51.1)	4.8 (40.6)	−1.2 (29.8)	−8.6 (16.5)	2.1 (35.8)
Mean daily minimum °C (°F)	−18.8 (−1.8)	−18.1 (−0.6)	−11.7 (10.9)	−3.4 (25.9)	2.0 (35.6)	7.3 (45.1)	10.7 (51.3)	9.9 (49.8)	5.4 (41.7)	0.6 (33.1)	−4.9 (23.2)	−13.0 (8.6)	−2.8 (27.0)
Mean minimum °C (°F)	−29.4 (−20.9)	−28.6 (−19.5)	−23.5 (−10.3)	−11.5 (11.3)	−2.8 (27.0)	2.3 (36.1)	6.7 (44.1)	5.6 (42.1)	0.0 (32.0)	−5.1 (22.8)	−13.9 (7.0)	−23.5 (−10.3)	−31.0 (−23.8)
Record low °C (°F)	−47.2 (−53.0)	−44.4 (−47.9)	−35.6 (−32.1)	−21.0 (−5.8)	−8.3 (17.1)	−3.2 (26.2)	0.6 (33.1)	−0.7 (30.7)	−6.1 (21.0)	−11.0 (12.2)	−22.8 (−9.0)	−37.8 (−36.0)	−47.2 (−53.0)
Record low wind chill	−53.0	−56.9	−48.3	−29.5	−19.0	−4.8	0.0	−2.7	−8.4	−15.1	−31.1	−51.5	−56.9
Average precipitation mm (inches)	64.9 (2.56)	60.5 (2.38)	64.2 (2.53)	71.8 (2.83)	76.2 (3.00)	82.7 (3.26)	110.8 (4.36)	81.9 (3.22)	92.6 (3.65)	96.3 (3.79)	86.6 (3.41)	77.7 (3.06)	966.1 (38.04)
Average rainfall mm (inches)	12.3 (0.48)	14.4 (0.57)	23.7 (0.93)	50.7 (2.00)	88.3 (3.48)	88.7 (3.49)	93.1 (3.67)	75.4 (2.97)	86.3 (3.40)	90.0 (3.54)	57.7 (2.27)	17.0 (0.67)	697.6 (27.46)
Average snowfall cm (inches)	83.8 (33.0)	59.1 (23.3)	48.2 (19.0)	30.3 (11.9)	2.7 (1.1)	0.0 (0.0)	0.0 (0.0)	0.0 (0.0)	0.01 (0.00)	5.4 (2.1)	40.2 (15.8)	73.2 (28.8)	342.9 (135.0)
Average precipitation days (≥ 0.2 mm)	16.4	13.6	14.4	12.7	14.2	13.5	15.7	13.1	13.4	14.6	14.6	16.1	172.2
Average rainy days (≥ 0.2 mm)	1.6	1.8	3.7	8.3	14.1	13.5	14.6	13.5	13.5	14.8	8.7	2.6	110.9
Average snowy days (≥ 0.2 cm)	16.8	11.8	10.7	6.2	0.89	0.0	0.0	0.0	0.05	1.7	8.6	14.3	71.1
Average relative humidity (%) (at 1500 LST)	64.9	63.5	64.4	66.4	62.4	63.6	68.1	67.2	68.9	70.9	72.6	71.0	67.0
Average dew point °C (°F)	−17.2 (1.0)	−16.1 (3.0)	−10.8 (12.6)	−4.6 (23.7)	1.9 (35.4)	7.7 (45.9)	11.8 (53.2)	11.4 (52.5)	7.2 (45.0)	1.4 (34.5)	−4.5 (23.9)	−11.3 (11.7)	−1.9 (28.6)
Mean monthly sunshine hours	112.5	134.4	163.5	181.7	217.3	237.1	244.0	238.4	163.8	123.4	90.7	94.7	2,001.5
Percentage possible sunshine	41.6	47.0	44.4	44.2	45.8	49.0	49.9	53.5	43.2	36.8	32.9	36.8	43.8
Source: Environment and Climate Change Canada (humidex, wind chill, record high / low, mean daily max / min, daily mean, & humidity from 1991–2020) (avg precipitation / precipitation days, rain / rain days, snow / snow days, & sun from 1981–2010) (mean maximum / minimum, & dew point from weatherstats.ca)

Climate data for Sept-Îles (Sept-Îles Airport) Climate ID: 7047910; coordinates 50°13′N 66°16′W; elevation: 54.9 m (180 ft); 1991−2020 normals, extremes 1903−present (Note: Extreme high and low temperatures were recorded in Clarke City from May 1903 to August 1944, and at Sept-Îles Airport from September 1944 to present.)
Month	Jan	Feb	Mar	Apr	May	Jun	Jul	Aug	Sep	Oct	Nov	Dec	Year
Record high humidex	9.4	8.9	14.9	19.6	29.6	39.2	35.4	33.4	32.0	25.0	17.5	7.9	39.2
Record high °C (°F)	10.0 (50.0)	10.6 (51.1)	16.4 (61.5)	20.1 (68.2)	28.3 (82.9)	36.6 (97.9)	32.2 (90.0)	31.1 (88.0)	29.4 (84.9)	22.7 (72.9)	16.9 (62.4)	9.4 (48.9)	36.6 (97.9)
Mean maximum °C (°F)	1.8 (35.2)	1.5 (34.7)	6.6 (43.9)	11.9 (53.4)	20.4 (68.7)	25.3 (77.5)	26.1 (79.0)	25.6 (78.1)	22.6 (72.7)	16.2 (61.2)	9.6 (49.3)	4.4 (39.9)	27.4 (81.3)
Mean daily maximum °C (°F)	−8.9 (16.0)	−7.4 (18.7)	−1.9 (28.6)	4.1 (39.4)	10.9 (51.6)	16.7 (62.1)	19.7 (67.5)	19.5 (67.1)	14.8 (58.6)	8.4 (47.1)	1.7 (35.1)	−4.9 (23.2)	6.1 (43.0)
Daily mean °C (°F)	−14.5 (5.9)	−13.4 (7.9)	−7.3 (18.9)	−0.1 (31.8)	6.0 (42.8)	11.6 (52.9)	15.1 (59.2)	14.6 (58.3)	9.8 (49.6)	4.3 (39.7)	−2.3 (27.9)	−9.6 (14.7)	1.2 (34.2)
Mean daily minimum °C (°F)	−20.1 (−4.2)	−19.4 (−2.9)	−12.7 (9.1)	−4.4 (24.1)	1.1 (34.0)	6.5 (43.7)	10.3 (50.5)	9.6 (49.3)	4.8 (40.6)	0.1 (32.2)	−6.3 (20.7)	−14.3 (6.3)	−3.7 (25.3)
Mean minimum °C (°F)	−32.7 (−26.9)	−32.0 (−25.6)	−27.0 (−16.6)	−13.8 (7.2)	−4.3 (24.3)	−0.4 (31.3)	5.2 (41.4)	3.7 (38.7)	−2.0 (28.4)	−7.5 (18.5)	−17.6 (0.3)	−27.3 (−17.1)	−34.1 (−29.4)
Record low °C (°F)	−43.3 (−45.9)	−38.3 (−36.9)	−32.8 (−27.0)	−26.4 (−15.5)	−11.7 (10.9)	−3.3 (26.1)	1.7 (35.1)	−1.0 (30.2)	−6.5 (20.3)	−13.3 (8.1)	−28.9 (−20.0)	−36.5 (−33.7)	−43.3 (−45.9)
Record low wind chill	−53.7	−49.6	−43.9	−32.1	−18.6	−6.0	0.0	0.0	−8.0	−18.0	−32.9	−47.7	−53.7
Average precipitation mm (inches)	77.3 (3.04)	59.7 (2.35)	74.1 (2.92)	75.7 (2.98)	85.6 (3.37)	86.9 (3.42)	103.2 (4.06)	85.6 (3.37)	106.9 (4.21)	118.3 (4.66)	112.2 (4.42)	92.0 (3.62)	1,077.4 (42.42)
Average rainfall mm (inches)	13.4 (0.53)	10.0 (0.39)	18.1 (0.71)	42.3 (1.67)	—	—	—	—	—	—	67.6 (2.66)	27.8 (1.09)	—
Average snowfall cm (inches)	82.2 (32.4)	57.2 (22.5)	61.8 (24.3)	36.5 (14.4)	—	—	—	—	—	—	42.7 (16.8)	78.1 (30.7)	—
Average precipitation days (≥ 0.2 mm)	16.4	13.8	13.9	12.3	13.7	13.2	15.7	14.2	14.3	15.8	15.2	15.5	174.0
Average rainy days (≥ 0.2 mm)	2.3	1.4	3.4	6.9	—	—	—	—	—	—	8.6	3.6	—
Average snowy days (≥ 0.2 cm)	15.0	12.0	11.7	7.3	—	—	—	—	—	—	8.0	13.6	—
Average relative humidity (%) (at 1500 LST)	64.4	61.2	63.2	64.7	65.3	67.5	71.8	71.5	70.9	71.0	72.4	71.3	67.9
Average dew point °C (°F)	−18.5 (−1.3)	−17.6 (0.3)	−11.8 (10.8)	−5.4 (22.3)	0.8 (33.4)	6.7 (44.1)	11.4 (52.5)	11.1 (52.0)	6.6 (43.9)	0.7 (33.3)	−5.4 (22.3)	−12.7 (9.1)	−2.8 (27.0)
Mean monthly sunshine hours	104.0	134.4	150.8	170.1	223.4	221.2	240.9	220.4	154.0	131.2	93.5	93.7	1,937.6
Source 1: Environment and Climate Change Canada (sun)
Source 2: weatherstats.ca (for dewpoint and monthly/yearly average absolute maximum/minimum temperature)

Climate data for La Grande Rivière (La Grande Rivière Airport) WMO ID: 71827; coordinates 53°38′N 77°42′W; elevation: 195.1 m (640 ft); 1991–2020 normals, extremes 1976–present
Month	Jan	Feb	Mar	Apr	May	Jun	Jul	Aug	Sep	Oct	Nov	Dec	Year
Record high humidex	3.0	4.8	12.0	21.8	33.9	38.0	44.3	35.5	31.6	28.3	13.4	7.6	44.3
Record high °C (°F)	3.3 (37.9)	5.0 (41.0)	11.8 (53.2)	22.3 (72.1)	32.6 (90.7)	35.0 (95.0)	37.3 (99.1)	31.2 (88.2)	28.3 (82.9)	23.5 (74.3)	12.3 (54.1)	7.4 (45.3)	37.3 (99.1)
Mean daily maximum °C (°F)	−17.2 (1.0)	−15.4 (4.3)	−7.9 (17.8)	0.5 (32.9)	10.1 (50.2)	18.1 (64.6)	20.7 (69.3)	18.8 (65.8)	12.9 (55.2)	5.5 (41.9)	−2.5 (27.5)	−10.8 (12.6)	2.7 (36.9)
Daily mean °C (°F)	−21.7 (−7.1)	−20.8 (−5.4)	−14.0 (6.8)	−5.1 (22.8)	4.3 (39.7)	11.5 (52.7)	14.8 (58.6)	13.6 (56.5)	8.6 (47.5)	2.4 (36.3)	−5.4 (22.3)	−14.5 (5.9)	−2.2 (28.0)
Mean daily minimum °C (°F)	−26.1 (−15.0)	−26.1 (−15.0)	−20.0 (−4.0)	−10.6 (12.9)	−1.6 (29.1)	4.9 (40.8)	8.8 (47.8)	8.3 (46.9)	4.3 (39.7)	−0.7 (30.7)	−8.3 (17.1)	−18.1 (−0.6)	−7.1 (19.2)
Record low °C (°F)	−40.9 (−41.6)	−44.6 (−48.3)	−39.7 (−39.5)	−31.4 (−24.5)	−22.6 (−8.7)	−6.6 (20.1)	−0.9 (30.4)	−0.5 (31.1)	−7.0 (19.4)	−16.7 (1.9)	−29.2 (−20.6)	−40.3 (−40.5)	−44.6 (−48.3)
Record low wind chill	−56.0	−56.9	−51.2	−40.1	−27.0	−12.5	−3.4	−6.5	−10.3	−19.7	−40.3	−52.9	−56.9
Average precipitation mm (inches)	31.0 (1.22)	22.2 (0.87)	27.9 (1.10)	29.2 (1.15)	43.8 (1.72)	61.7 (2.43)	85.6 (3.37)	89.7 (3.53)	110.3 (4.34)	88.5 (3.48)	68.1 (2.68)	43.9 (1.73)	701.9 (27.63)
Average rainfall mm (inches)	1.1 (0.04)	1.2 (0.05)	3.4 (0.13)	9.3 (0.37)	34.6 (1.36)	60.0 (2.36)	85.6 (3.37)	90.9 (3.58)	107.0 (4.21)	62.5 (2.46)	15.2 (0.60)	1.7 (0.07)	472.5 (18.60)
Average snowfall cm (inches)	30.4 (12.0)	21.6 (8.5)	24.7 (9.7)	19.9 (7.8)	9.5 (3.7)	2.3 (0.9)	0.0 (0.0)	0.0 (0.0)	3.4 (1.3)	26.4 (10.4)	54.5 (21.5)	43.0 (16.9)	235.7 (92.8)
Average precipitation days (≥ 0.2 mm)	16.6	11.7	11.4	10.5	13.1	11.7	15.2	15.8	20.1	20.7	22.3	20.1	189.1
Average rainy days (≥ 0.2 mm)	0.42	0.68	1.0	3.7	9.3	11.4	15.2	15.9	19.5	13.7	5.0	1.4	97.2
Average snowy days (≥ 0.2 cm)	16.5	11.6	10.8	8.5	5.7	1.2	0.04	0.0	1.5	10.5	20.3	19.8	106.4
Average relative humidity (%) (at 1500 LST)	74.4	67.3	59.7	56.6	54.0	49.8	56.6	60.2	68.8	76.3	84.5	81.8	65.8
Source: Environment and Climate Change Canada

Climate data for Kuujjuaq (Kuujjuaq Airport) WMO ID: 71906; coordinates 58°06′N 68°25′W; elevation: 39.9 m (131 ft); 1991–2020 normals, extremes 1947–present
Month	Jan	Feb	Mar	Apr	May	Jun	Jul	Aug	Sep	Oct	Nov	Dec	Year
Record high humidex	5.0	6.3	11.7	17.9	27.5	38.9	37.9	33.2	32.2	20.4	10.3	5.8	38.9
Record high °C (°F)	5.6 (42.1)	7.8 (46.0)	12.1 (53.8)	19.2 (66.6)	31.1 (88.0)	33.1 (91.6)	34.3 (93.7)	30.7 (87.3)	28.3 (82.9)	20.0 (68.0)	10.2 (50.4)	8.3 (46.9)	34.3 (93.7)
Mean daily maximum °C (°F)	−18.9 (−2.0)	−18.1 (−0.6)	−11.3 (11.7)	−3.2 (26.2)	5.7 (42.3)	13.2 (55.8)	18.1 (64.6)	16.8 (62.2)	10.6 (51.1)	3.8 (38.8)	−3.9 (25.0)	−12.2 (10.0)	0.1 (32.2)
Daily mean °C (°F)	−23.3 (−9.9)	−23.1 (−9.6)	−16.9 (1.6)	−8.4 (16.9)	1.2 (34.2)	7.8 (46.0)	12.5 (54.5)	11.8 (53.2)	6.7 (44.1)	0.8 (33.4)	−7.2 (19.0)	−16.2 (2.8)	−4.5 (23.9)
Mean daily minimum °C (°F)	−27.7 (−17.9)	−28.0 (−18.4)	−22.5 (−8.5)	−13.4 (7.9)	−3.3 (26.1)	2.4 (36.3)	6.9 (44.4)	6.6 (43.9)	2.8 (37.0)	−2.1 (28.2)	−10.5 (13.1)	−20.2 (−4.4)	−9.1 (15.6)
Record low °C (°F)	−49.8 (−57.6)	−43.9 (−47.0)	−43.9 (−47.0)	−34.1 (−29.4)	−24.7 (−12.5)	−8.3 (17.1)	−1.6 (29.1)	−1.7 (28.9)	−7.8 (18.0)	−20.0 (−4.0)	−31.1 (−24.0)	−43.9 (−47.0)	−49.8 (−57.6)
Record low wind chill	−60.4	−58.0	−55.3	−45.6	−30.6	−13.2	−5.7	−6.5	−11.9	−32.9	−42.8	−56.3	−60.4
Average precipitation mm (inches)	30.7 (1.21)	29.3 (1.15)	31.6 (1.24)	27.4 (1.08)	31.5 (1.24)	51.1 (2.01)	75.2 (2.96)	75.9 (2.99)	87.8 (3.46)	57.0 (2.24)	43.8 (1.72)	36.9 (1.45)	578.2 (22.76)
Average rainfall mm (inches)	0.0 (0.0)	0.3 (0.01)	0.2 (0.01)	3.6 (0.14)	13.5 (0.53)	47.8 (1.88)	75.3 (2.96)	75.8 (2.98)	84.9 (3.34)	34.8 (1.37)	5.1 (0.20)	1.8 (0.07)	343.2 (13.51)
Average snowfall cm (inches)	30.6 (12.0)	29.2 (11.5)	31.6 (12.4)	23.3 (9.2)	18.3 (7.2)	4.3 (1.7)	0.0 (0.0)	0.0 (0.0)	2.9 (1.1)	21.3 (8.4)	38.9 (15.3)	35.1 (13.8)	235.4 (92.7)
Average precipitation days (≥ 0.2 mm)	15.7	12.9	14.8	12.0	12.5	13.3	15.6	18.3	19.9	18.3	17.6	15.5	186.1
Average rainy days (≥ 0.2 mm)	0.12	0.15	0.42	1.8	6.5	12.5	15.3	18.3	19.2	10.6	2.6	0.92	88.3
Average snowy days (≥ 0.2 cm)	15.6	12.9	14.7	10.9	8.2	2.5	0.04	0.08	1.9	11.1	16.9	19.2	109.8
Average relative humidity (%) (at 1500 LST)	66.2	61.3	61.9	65.1	62.8	58.9	59.3	63.6	68.0	73.5	77.7	73.4	66.0
Average dew point °C (°F)	−24.9 (−12.8)	−23.6 (−10.5)	−18.3 (−0.9)	−9.8 (14.4)	−2.1 (28.2)	2.7 (36.9)	7.1 (44.8)	7.0 (44.6)	2.4 (36.3)	−2.5 (27.5)	−9.2 (15.4)	−20.1 (−4.2)	−7.6 (18.3)
Mean monthly sunshine hours	62.7	108.3	163.8	197.2	137.8	180.1	197.2	166.6	99.1	48.8	51.7	53.5	1,467.2
Source: Environment and Climate Change Canada (sun 1951–1980) (dew point at 1300 LST 1951–1980) (July maximum)

== Wildlife ==
The province is home to a wide variety of fauna. Birdlife includes wild turkey (Meleagris gallopavo), yellow-bellied sapsucker (Sphyrapicus varius) and loggerhead shrike (Lanius ludovicianus).

The larger terrestrial wildlife is mainly composed of white-tailed deer, eastern moose, boreal woodland caribou, muskox, American black bear and polar bear. Medium-sized land wildlife includes the cougar, northeastern coyote, eastern wolf, Labrador wolf, bobcat, red fox, and Arctic fox. Small animals include eastern grey squirrel, snowshoe hare, groundhog, striped skunk, raccoon, Eastern chipmunk and Canadian beaver.

Biodiversity of the estuary and gulf of Saint Lawrence River consists of an aquatic mammal wildlife, of which most goes upriver through the estuary and the Saguenay–St. Lawrence Marine Park until the Île d'Orléans (French for Orleans Island), such as the blue whale, the beluga, the minke whale and the harp seal (earless seal). Among the Nordic marine animals, there are two particularly important to cite: the walrus and the narwhal.

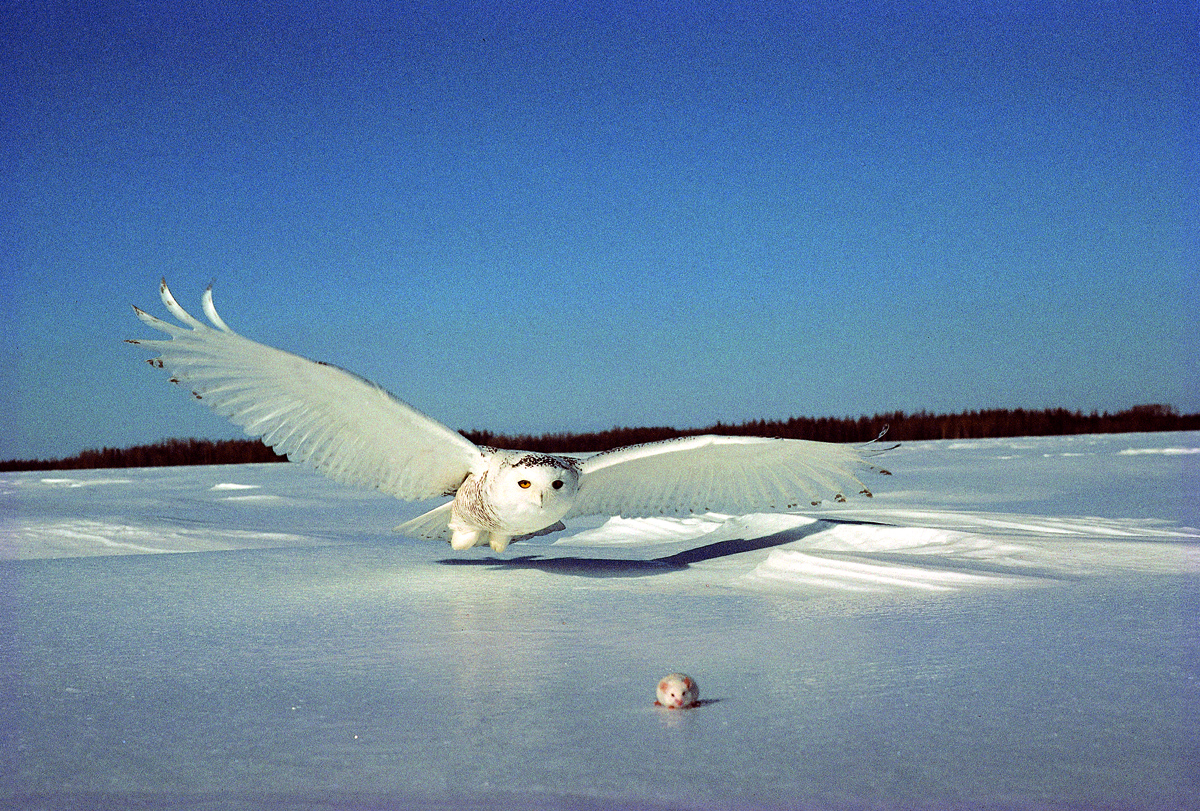
The snowy owl is the official bird of Quebec

Inland waters are populated by small to large fresh water fish, such as the largemouth bass, the American pickerel, the walleye, the Acipenser oxyrinchus, the muskellunge, the Atlantic cod, the Arctic char, the brook trout, the Microgadus tomcod (tomcod), the Atlantic salmon, the rainbow trout, etc.

Among the birds commonly seen in the southern inhabited part of Quebec, there are the American robin, the house sparrow, the red-winged blackbird, the mallard, the common grackle, the blue jay, the American crow, the black-capped chickadee, some warblers and swallows, the common starling and the rock dove, the latter two having been introduced in Quebec and are found mainly in urban areas. Avian fauna includes birds of prey like the golden eagle, the peregrine falcon, the snowy owl and the bald eagle. Sea and semi-aquatic birds seen in Quebec are mostly the Canada goose, the double-crested cormorant, the northern gannet, the American herring gull, the great blue heron, the sandhill crane, the Atlantic puffin and the common loon. Many more species of land, maritime or avian wildlife are seen in Quebec, but most of the Quebec-specific species and the most commonly seen species are listed above.

Some livestock have the title of "Québec heritage breed", namely the Canadian horse, the Chantecler chicken and the Canadian cow. Moreover, in addition to food certified as "organic", Charlevoix lamb is the first local Quebec product whose geographical indication is protected. Livestock production also includes the pig breeds Landrace, Duroc and Yorkshire and many breeds of sheep and cattle.

The Wildlife Foundation of Quebec and the Data Centre on Natural Heritage of Quebec (CDPNQ) (French acronym) are the main agencies working with officers for wildlife conservation in Quebec.

== Vegetation ==
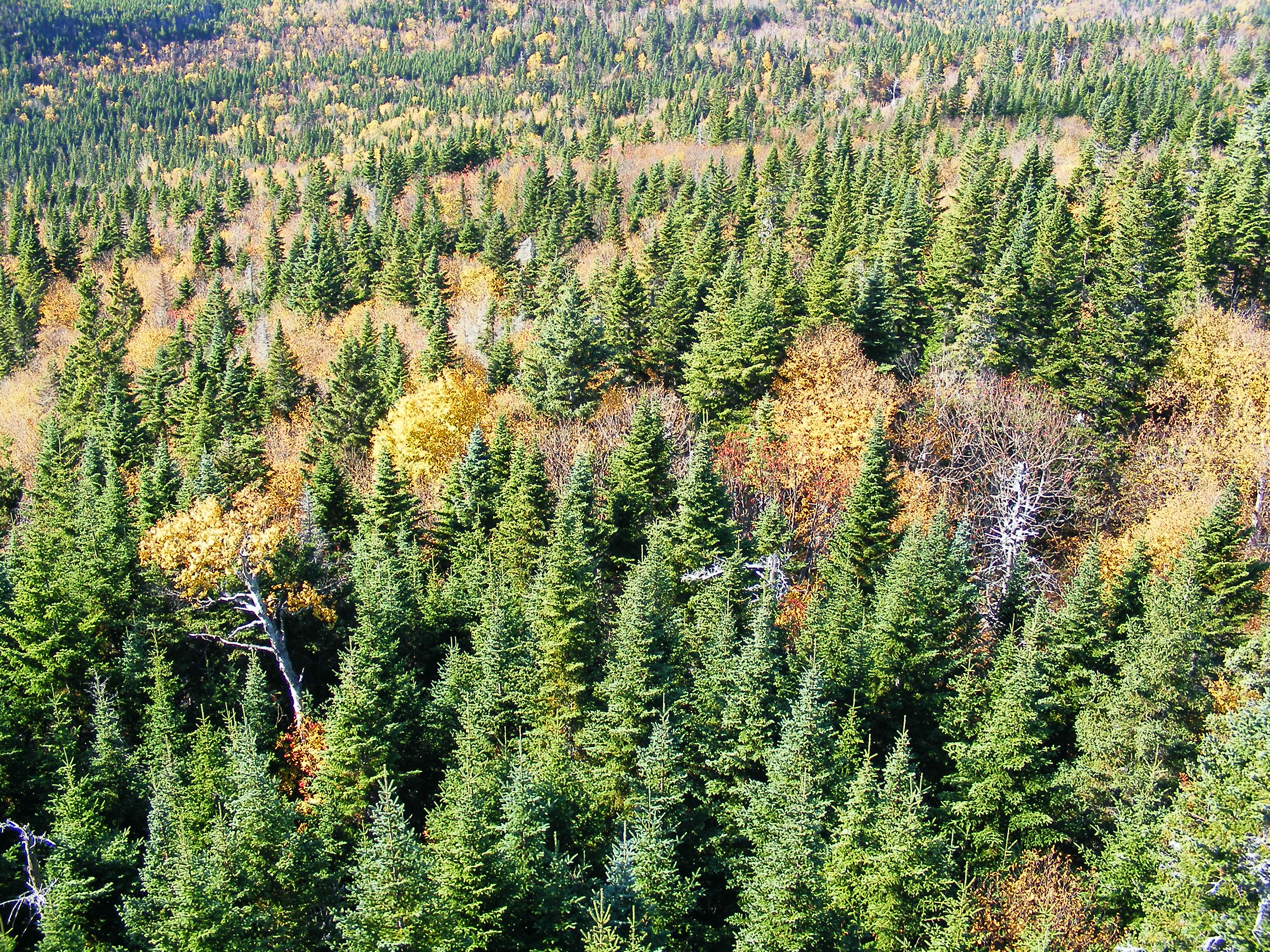
Taiga forest in Gaspé, Québec, Canada

Given the geology of the province and its different climates, there is an established number of large areas of vegetation in Quebec. These areas, listed in order from the northernmost to the southernmost are: the tundra, the taiga, the Canadian boreal forest (coniferous), mixed forest and deciduous forest.

Different forest areas of Quebec

On the edge of the Ungava Bay and Hudson Strait is the tundra, whose flora is limited to a low vegetation of lichen with only less than 50 growing days a year. The tundra vegetation survives an average annual temperature of −8 °C (18 °F). The tundra covers more than 24% of the area of Quebec. Further south, the climate is conducive to the growth of the Canadian boreal forest, bounded on the north by the taiga.

Not as arid as the tundra, the taiga is associated with the sub-Arctic regions of the Canadian Shield and is characterized by a greater number of both plant (600) and animal (206) species, many of which live there all year. The taiga covers about 20% of the area of Quebec. The Canadian boreal forest is the northernmost and most abundant of the three forest areas in Quebec that straddle the Canadian Shield and the upper lowlands of the province. Given a warmer climate, the diversity of organisms is also higher, since there are about 850 plant species and 280 vertebrates species. The Canadian boreal forest covers 27% of the area of Quebec. The mixed forest is a transition zone between the Canadian boreal and deciduous forests. By virtue of its transient nature, this area contains a diversity of habitats resulting in large numbers of plant (1000) and vertebrate (350) species, despite relatively cool temperatures. The ecozone mixed forest covers 11.5% of Quebec and is characteristic of the Laurentians, the Appalachians and the eastern lowlands forests. The third most northern forest area is characterized by deciduous forests. Because of its climate (average annual temperature of 7 °C [45 °F]), it is in this area that one finds the greatest diversity of species, including more than 1600 vascular plants and 440 vertebrates. Its relatively long growing season lasts almost 200 days and its fertile soils make it the centre of agricultural activity and therefore of urbanization of Quebec. Most of Quebec's population lives in this area of vegetation, almost entirely along the banks of the Saint Lawrence. Deciduous forests cover approximately 6.6% of Quebec.

The forest area of Quebec is estimated at 750,300 km^{2} (289,700 sq mi). From the Abitibi-Témiscamingue to the North Shore, the forest is composed primarily of conifers such as the balsam fir, the jack pine, the white spruce, the black spruce and the tamarack. Some species of deciduous trees such as the yellow birch appear when the river is approached in the south. The deciduous forest of the Great Lakes–St. Lawrence Lowlands is mostly composed of deciduous species such as the sugar maple, the red maple, the white ash, the American beech, the butternut (white walnut), the American elm, the basswood, the bitternut hickory and the northern red oak as well as some conifers such as the eastern white pine and the northern whitecedar. The distribution areas of the paper birch, the trembling aspen and the mountain ash cover more than half of Quebec territory.

== See also ==
- Ecological regions of Quebec
- Île Rouleau crater
- Manicouagan crater
