= New England–Acadian forests =

Temperate broadleaf and mixed forest ecoregion of Canada and the United States

New England-Acadian forests
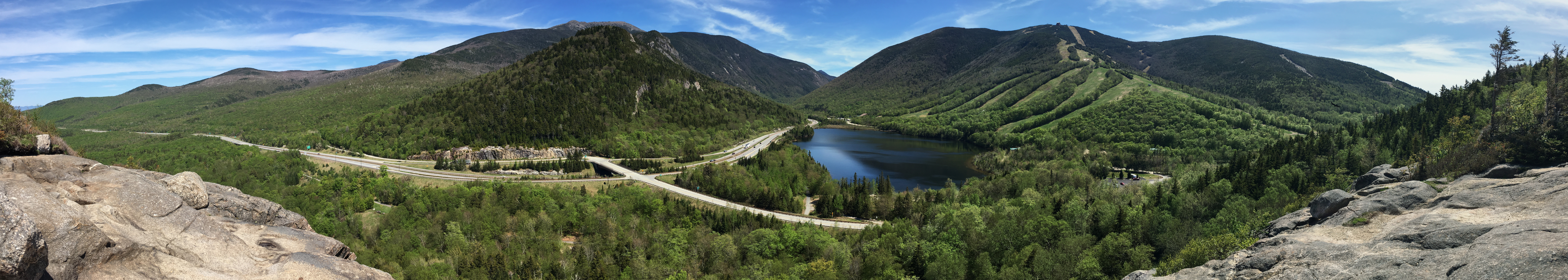
- White Mountains of New Hampshire

Ecology
- Realm: Nearctic
- Biome: Temperate broadleaf and mixed forests
- Borders: Eastern Canadian forests; Gulf of St. Lawrence lowland forests; Eastern Great Lakes lowland forests; Northeastern coastal forests
- Bird species: 219
- Mammal species: 58

Geography
- Area: 237,600 km^{2} (91,700 mi^{2})
- Countries: Canada; United States
- States/Provinces: List: Connecticut; Maine; Massachusetts; New Brunswick; New Hampshire; New York; Nova Scotia; Quebec; Vermont
- Climate type: Humid continental (Dfb)

Conservation
- Conservation status: Critical/Endangered
- Habitat loss: 4.2%
- Protected: 26.8%

The New England-Acadian forests (also referred to as the Wabanaki-Acadian Forests in Canada) are a temperate broadleaf and mixed forest ecoregion in North America that includes a variety of habitats on the hills, mountains and plateaus of New England and New York State in the Northeastern United States, and Quebec and the Maritime Provinces of Eastern Canada.

In eastern Canada, there is a growing movement to refer to this forest type as the Wabanaki-Acadian Forest in recognition of the area's indigenous inhabitants, who did not cede or surrender their traditional territories in the region when the Acadians and New Englanders arrived.

== Climate ==
This ecoregion has a humid continental climate with warm summers and cold winters.

== Setting ==
This ecoregion is bordered by the oak-dominated Northeastern coastal forests on the coastal plain to the south, the Gulf of St. Lawrence lowland forests on the coasts and islands of the Gulf of Saint Lawrence, and to the north and northeast the Eastern forest-boreal transition and the Eastern Canadian forests. There is also a disjunct patch of forest-boreal transition on the Adirondack Mountains.

In Canada, the New England-Acadian forests ecoregion includes the Eastern Townships and Beauce regions of southern Quebec, half of New Brunswick and most of Nova Scotia, and in the United States, the North Country of New York State, most of Maine, the Lake Champlain and the Champlain Valley of Vermont, the uplands and coastal plain of New Hampshire, northwestern Massachusetts, and ends down in the highlands of extreme northwestern portion of Connecticut. This entire area is sometimes referred to as the Atlantic Northeast. Specific areas include the Bay of Fundy coast, northern Appalachian Mountains including the uplands and the Saint John River valley of New Brunswick and the highlands of the Nova Scotia peninsula with the highest peaks being the White Mountains of New Hampshire.

The climate consists of warm summers and cold snowy winters with the Atlantic Ocean bringing rain all year round. The seaboard lowlands of this region, which extends to mid-coastal Maine, exhibits a more mild climate and has somewhat distinct vegetation in which hardwoods play a more important role.

== Flora ==
The forests of this area were radically cleared for agricultural land by the 19th century and then renewed as many of these farms were abandoned following the migration westward. Today the area is largely a mosaic of habitats influenced locally by micro-climatic differences (especially proximity to the Atlantic, and ecological disturbances). Essentially, there are four important community types which show considerable diversity and blending across this physiographic province. These communities are: alpine communities on the highest mountains, coniferous forests, northern hardwood forests, and wetlands. There are no clear boundaries between the coniferous forests and the hardwood forests in the New England-Acadian ecoregion. The prevalence in the canopy of red pine (Pinus resinosa) and red spruce (Picea rubens) distinguish the transition forests of New England from those in the Great Lakes region to the west.

The vegetation of the New England and Maritime Appalachian Highlands is similar throughout the Nova Scotia highlands including the Cobequid Hills and the Pictou-Antigonish Highlands on the mainland and the Cape Breton Highlands, the Chaleur Uplands of New Brunswick, the New England Uplands, the White Mountains and Mont Mégantic on the New Hampshire/Quebec border, the Green Mountains of Vermont and their southern extension the Sutton Mountains, and the Taconic Mountains. Some of western Vermont is in the Adirondack province, but generally exhibits similar vegetation.

Areas of particular interest include areas of serpentine rocks, peat bog and fen.

=== Alpine communities ===
Alpine communities are essentially regions of Arctic tundra, or treeless tundra-like communities. These are restricted to the tops of mountains that reach above the tree line, about 1300 metres (4,265 feet).

Mountaintops of Nova Scotia's Cape Breton Island (highest point 1,755 feet) may have minor alpine biota, krumholtz and other aspects, as do many other smaller isolated peaks throughout the region. Full-blown alpine communities are found on Washington and the other White Mountains of New Hampshire and on Mount Katahdin in Maine. Quebec's Gaspé Peninsula, vegetatively similar to Maine and New Brunswick, also has extensive treeless uplands—which are rare in the region.

These tall mountains serve as refugia for arctic plants left over from the retreat of the Laurentide glacier at the end of the last ice age (the Wisconsin glaciation). The truest alpine tundra communities are located on the harsh western and northwestern slopes of tall mountains. The western slopes are typically heath dominated communities composed of plant of the family Ericaceae, changing to grasses and sedges toward the harsher northwestern faces. Common dominant components of the heaths are alpine bilberry (Vaccinium uliginosum) and mountain cranberry (Vaccinium vitis-idaea).

=== Coniferous forests ===
Coniferous forests are found in the White Mountain regions and the northern parts of New England Uplands, primarily the middle interior of Maine and northwards and especially in areas between 1300 metres (4,265 feet) and 900 metres (2,953) feet) elevation. It is also found on parts of the Fundy coast in Maine and the Maritimes, the northern parts of this ecoregion where the summers are cool. The coniferous forest goes by many names, including: Boreal forest, fir-spruce forest, the North Woods, and the taiga. It is noted in New England for its "harsh" conditions such as cold, subarctic temperatures, a short growing period, sandy-gravely acidic soil, and a high rate of leeching of nutrients out of the soil. It is also noted for a high rate of precipitation, year round, as rain and snow, which contributes to much of the leeching.

The dominant canopy species of this area include red pine (Pinus resinosa), balsam fir (Abies balsamea), paper birch (Betula papyrifera), red spruce (Picea rubens), which northwards, is replaced by white spruce (Picea glauca). Also present are jack pine (Pinus banksiana), and white pine (Pinus strobus) which is found in areas of richer soil in the lower elevations of this forest. The presence of paper birch (Betula papyrifera), a successional species, is often an indication of past disturbances such as fire or logging in the forest.

Typical woody understory and shrub layer species include moosewood (Acer pensylvanicum), low-bush blueberry (Vaccinium angustifolium) and other heath species, especially the genera Gaylussacia and Vaccinium.

Woody plants of the ground cover layer include American wintergreen (Gaultheria procumbens) and partridge berry (Mitchella repens). Common wildflowers include star flower (Trientalis borealis), bluebead Lilly (Clintonia borealis), foam flower (Tiarella cordifolia), bunchberry (Cornus canadensis), twinflower (Linnaea borealis), dewdrops (Dalibarda repens), wild sarsaparilla (Aralia nudicaulis), and Canada mayflower (Maianthemum canadense). Trilliums, and yellow lady slippers (genus Cypripedium) are also common showy wildflowers. The herbaceous layer also includes many mosses, lichens, and ferns. Bracken fern (Pteridium aquilinum) is often particularly abundant in these communities.

=== Northern hardwood forests ===
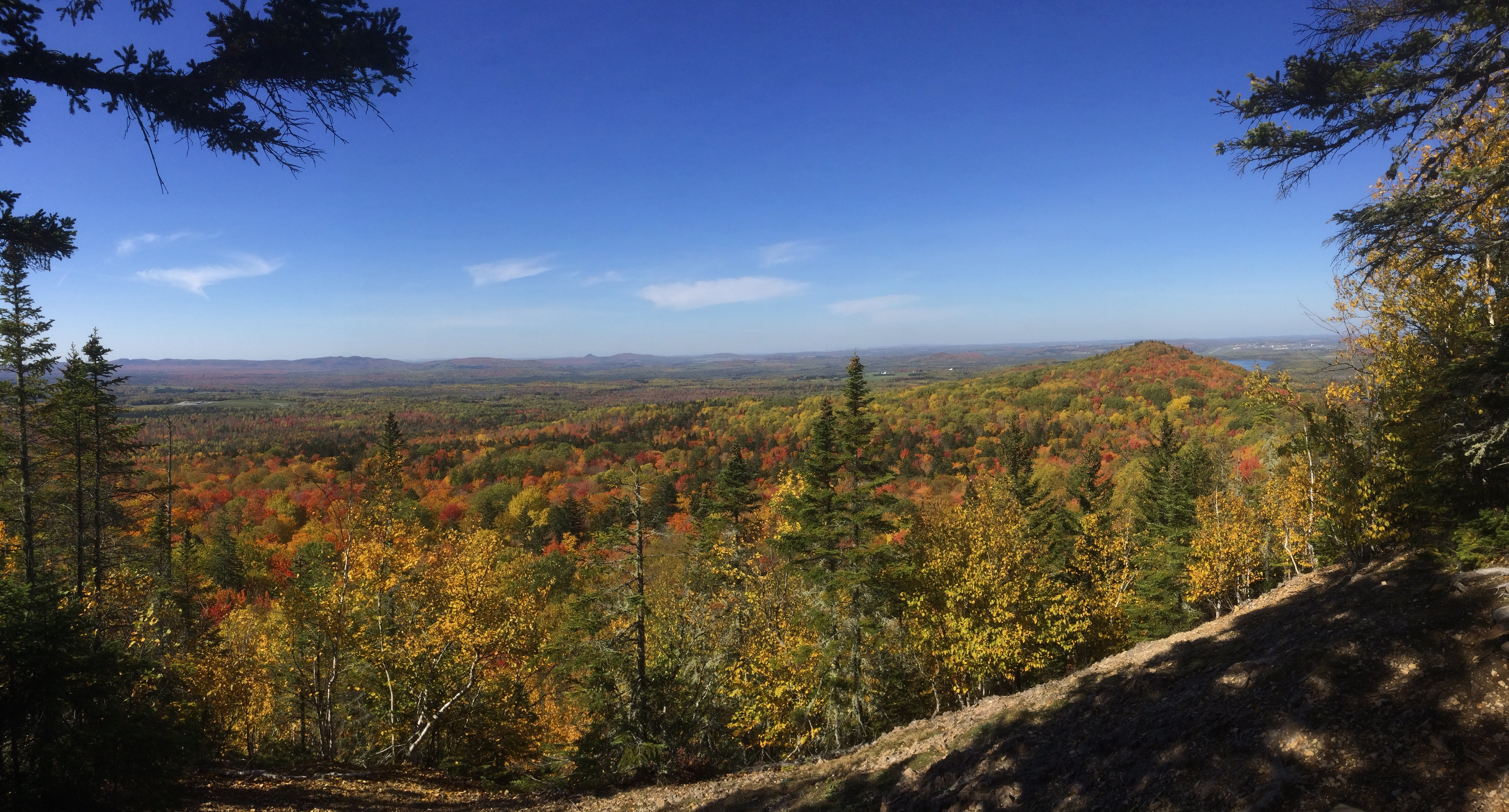
Mixed coniferous and deciduous forest in Maine.

These forests also go by the names: hemlock-northern hardwoods, and mixed forests. The northern hardwoods are located in the seaboard lowlands and south of the coniferous forests, but there is considerable blending of the two communities. These forests are typical of elevations below 700 m. Elements of these communities mix extensively with coniferous forest elements between 700 m and 900 m, and also from mid-latitude Vermont and New Hampshire north to central Maine where coniferous forest elements begin to dominate. Typically the richer the soils, and the more temperate the climate, the more dominant hardwoods will be. This forest type is considered the northern extension of the mixed mesophytic deciduous forest.

The four dominant canopy species of the hemlock-northern hardwood forests are sugar maple (Acer saccharum), beech (Fagus grandifolia), yellow birch (Betula alleghaniensis) and hemlock (Tsuga canadensis). Other common canopy associates include white ash (Fraxinus americana), red maple (Acer rubrum), and northern red oak (Quercus rubra), which becomes less and less common northwards, dropping out almost entirely by mid-Vermont, New Hampshire, and inland Maine. White oak (Quercus alba) is also an important canopy species in southern New England's seaboard lowlands. White pine (Pinus strobus) and red pine (Pinus resinosa), are also an important part of this mixed forest. The pioneer trees of this forest are quaking aspen (Populus tremuloides) and paper birch (Betula papyrifera).

=== Wetlands ===
Wetlands are defined anywhere by an abundance of water, hydric soils, and a unique flora. The wetland of the New England area exhibit considerable diversity across the range and elevations within the three category: bogs, swamps, and bottomlands. Swamps and bogs are specific habitats whereas bottomlands are any moist area including riparian zones, lake and pond banks, and the moist area surrounding bogs, marshes and swamps.

=== Bogs ===
Bogs are wetland areas, characterized by acid hydric soils composed of peat. Bogs can occur at any elevation in this ecoregion. They are often sphagnum heath areas dominated by shrubs in the family Ericaceae including: leather leaf (Chamaedaphne calyculata), bog rosemary (Andromeda polifolia), Labrador tea (Ledum groenlandicum), bog laurel (Kalmia polifolia), and American cranberry bushes (Vaccinium macrocarpon). Throughout New England these areas are often artificially made for cranberry monocultures by commercial farms. Common components of the herb layer in bogs includes the carnivorous plants: round-leaved sundew (Drosera rotundifolia), and pitcher plant (Sarracenia purpurea). Other common herbs of the poor soils of bogs include false mayflower (Maianthemum trifolium), and some orchids, particularly, bog candles (Platanthera dilatata). The most common trees that invade bogs as they fill in are black spruce (Picea mariana), northern white cedar (Thuja occidentalis), larch (Larix laricina) and black ash (Fraxinus nigra).

=== Swamps ===
Swamps are typically characterized by hydric soils and have more of a canopy than bogs. The most characteristic trees of southern and low altitude New England swamps are hemlock (Tsuga canadensis), northern white cedar (Thuja occidentalis), tamarack (Larix laricina), balsam poplar (Populus balsamifera), red maple (Acer rubrum), atlantic white cedar (Chamaecyparis thyoides), tupelo (Nyssa sylvatica) and black ash (Fraxinus nigra). Often cool, moist shaded ravines are dominated by pure stands of hemlocks in this range. In northern and high altitude swamps of New England the dominant canopy species change to tamarack, black spruce (Picea mariana) and balsam fir (Abies balsamea). The understory across the range consists of a number of Viburnum species, among others.

=== Bottomlands ===
The bottomlands and margin areas in the northern hardwood communities are primarily dominated by: red maple (Acer rubrum), balsam poplar (Populus balsamifera), black ash (Fraxinus nigra), eastern cottonwood (Populus deltoides), and the silver maple (Acer saccharinum). The bottomlands and margin areas of the coniferous forests consist of: red maple, silver maple, white cedar, and balsam poplar. In wet areas throughout the region many sub-canopy species of willow (Salix spp.) occur, as does speckled alder (Alnus rugosa), which is very common.

== Fauna ==
The region is home to a variety of wildlife, including American black bears (Ursus americanus), eastern moose (Alces alces), white-tailed deer (Odocoileus virginianus), eastern coyotes (Canis latrans ssp.), red foxes (Vulpes vulpes), gray fox (Urocyon cinereoargenteus), snowshoe hares (Lepus americanus), bobcats (Lynx rufus), Canada lynx (Lynx canadensis), North American porcupines (Erethizon dorsatum), North American river otters (Lontra canadensis), fishers (Pekania pennanti), North American beavers (Castor canadensis), American martens (Martes americana), muskrats (Ondatra zibethicus), raccoons (Procyon lotor), Virginia opossums (Didelphis virginiana), and endemic New England cottontails (Sylvilagus transitionalis). The forests are habitat for wild turkey (Meleagris gallopavo), mallard duck (Anas platyrhynchos), wood duck (Aix sponsa), great horned owl (Bubo virginianus), and a great number of passerine birds. The area is particularly important as a feeding ground for birds migrating on the Atlantic Flyway.

The region is home to reptiles such as bog turtles (Glyptemys muhlenbergii), common snapping turtles (Chelydra serpentina), common box turtles (Terrapene carolina), painted turtles (Chrysemys picta), and timber rattlesnakes (Crotalus horridus). Animal species or subspecies that once roamed the region are the eastern wolf (Canis lycaon), eastern cougar (Puma concolor couguar), Allegheny woodrat (Neotoma magister), sea mink (Neogale macrodon), wolverine (Gulo gulo), passenger pigeon (Ectopistes migratorius), heath hen (Tympanuchus cupido cupido), boreal woodland caribou (Rangifer tarandus caribou), and the eastern elk (Cervus canadensis canadensis), all of which were wiped out from the region after the arrival of European settlers.

== Threats and preservation ==
This forest has been radically altered over centuries by clearance for agriculture, mining and urban development including Halifax, Nova Scotia and summer homes in Quebec. Today only about 5% of the forest remains in its natural state. Logging is still a major industry in some parts, especially Maine and Quebec and agriculture is still extensive in western New Brunswick, Nova Scotia, and Vermont.

Notable areas of remaining forest (listed by state or province) include:

Maine

- Howland Forest
- Mahoosuc Range
- Big Reed Forest Preserve in Piscataquis County
- Baxter State Park

=== New Hampshire ===
- Crawford Notch
- Dry River Wilderness
- Franconia Notch State Park
- Great Gulf Wilderness
- Mount Nancy
- Nash Stream Forest
- Sandwich Range
- White Mountain National Forest

=== Vermont ===
- Camel's Hump
- Green Mountain National Forest
- Lye Brook Wilderness
- Mount Mansfield
- Putnam State Forest
- Victory State Forest

=== New Brunswick ===
- Fundy National Park
- Kouchibouguac National Park
- Mount Carleton Provincial Park

=== Nova Scotia ===
- Kejimkujik National Park and National Historic Site
- Cape Breton Highlands National Park
- Tobeatic Wilderness Area
- Liscomb Game Sanctuary
- Tangier Grand Lake Wilderness Area
- Victoria Park

=== Quebec ===
- Bic National Park
- Frontenac National Park
- Mont Mégantic
- Mont Orford
- Forillon National Park

== See also ==
- List of ecoregions in Canada (WWF)
- List of ecoregions in the United States (WWF)
