= Eastern Canadian Boreal Forests =

Taiga ecoregion of eastern Canada

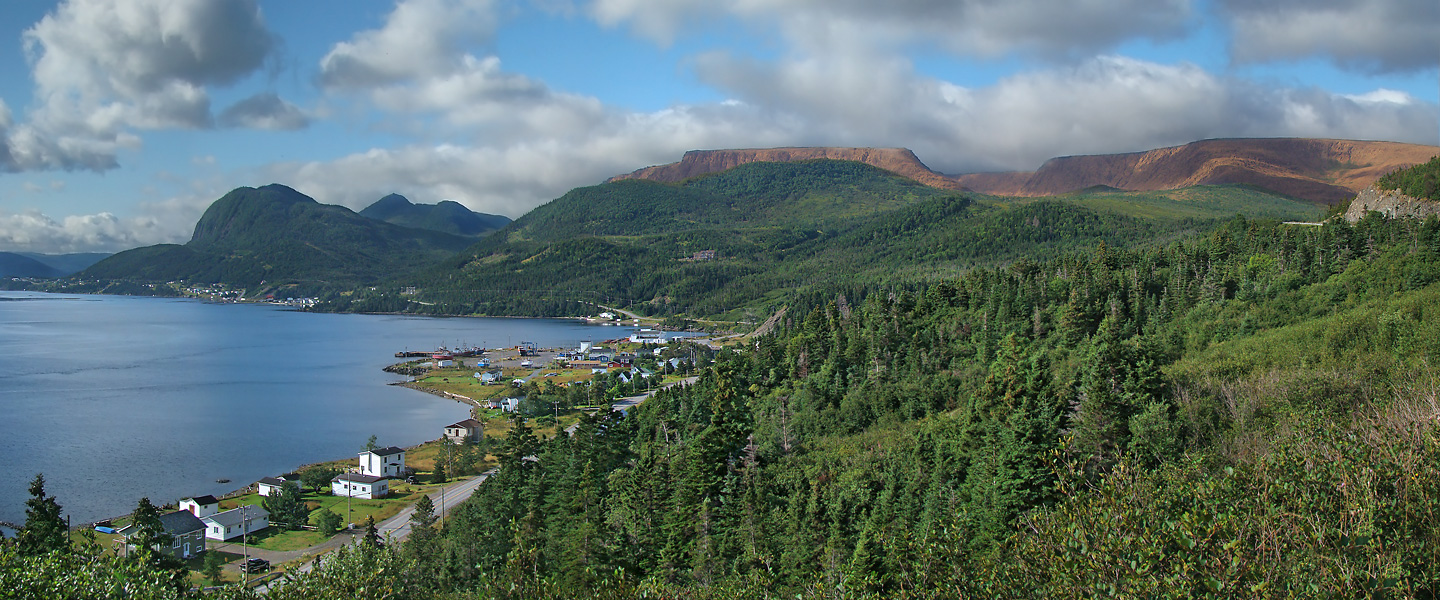
- Long Range Mountains of Newfoundland

Ecology
- Realm: Nearctic
- Biome: Boreal forests/taiga
- Borders: List: Central Canadian Shield forests; Eastern Canadian Shield taiga; Eastern forest–boreal transition; Gulf of St. Lawrence lowland forests; New England/Acadian forests; Newfoundland Highland forests; South Avalon-Burin oceanic barrens
- Bird species: 159
- Mammal species: 47

Geography
- Area: 486,918 km^{2} (188,000 mi^{2})
- Country: Canada
- Provinces: New Brunswick; Newfoundland and Labrador; Nova Scotia; Quebec

Conservation
- Conservation status: Critical/Endangered
- Habitat loss: 0.2%
- Protected: 5.52%

The Eastern Canadian Boreal Forests is a boreal ecoregion in Eastern Canada, defined by the One Earth ecoregion categorization system.

== Setting ==
This ecoregion contains a number of mountainous areas on the east coast of Canada and along the Saint Lawrence River in eastern Quebec (including Anticosti Island in the Saint Lawrence) and the coast up to near Labrador, on the island of Newfoundland, in the highlands of New Brunswick, and the Cape Breton Highlands on Cape Breton Island, Nova Scotia. The mountains included are the Laurentian Mountains, to the north of the ecoregion, and the northernmost ranges of the Appalachian Mountains chain to the south, with peaks over 1000m, including the rugged Gaspé Peninsula of Quebec. The climate is cool and wet and the coast is subject to heavy fog, especially on the Strait of Belle Isle between Labrador and Newfoundland for example. The Central Canadian Shield forests ecoregion lies inland to the west and has more black spruce than the balsam fir that are the dominant tree in this ecoregion.

== Flora ==
The dominant trees of these coastal forests are balsam fir Abies balsamea along with black spruce Picea mariana, white spruce Picea glauca on the shoreline, and paper birch Betula papyrifera and aspen Populus tremuloides where the forest is regrown following logging or other disturbance. Other plants include mosses and coastal heath shrubs. Sheltered areas within the mountains, such as the valley around Lac St. Jean have a different woodland pattern.

== Fauna ==
This coast is a breeding ground for large colonies of eiders and other seabirds. Mammals include moose (Alces alces), American black bear (Ursus americanus), Canada lynx (Lynx canadensis), red fox (Vulpes vulpes), snowshoe hare and grey wolf.

== Threats and preservation ==
This coast has long been inhabited and the forest much altered especially by logging. However up to 40% remains intact, especially in the north of the region in Quebec, while the Gaspé Peninsula, northern New Brunswick and Newfoundland are more heavily populated and the environment therefore much changed and fragmented.

Mining has also damaged habitats in certain areas such as Matamec. Protected areas include Bay du Nord Wilderness Reserve, Avalon Wilderness Reserve, Middle Ridge Wildlife Reserve and Terra Nova National Park in Newfoundland; Monts-Valin National Park north of the Saguenay River, Gaspésie National Park, Saguenay National Park and Forillon National Park in Quebec; and Cape Breton Highlands National Park and Pollett's Cove in Nova Scotia.

== See also ==
- List of ecoregions in Canada (WWF)
