= Central Canadian Shield forests =

Taiga ecoregion of Ontario and Quebec, Canada

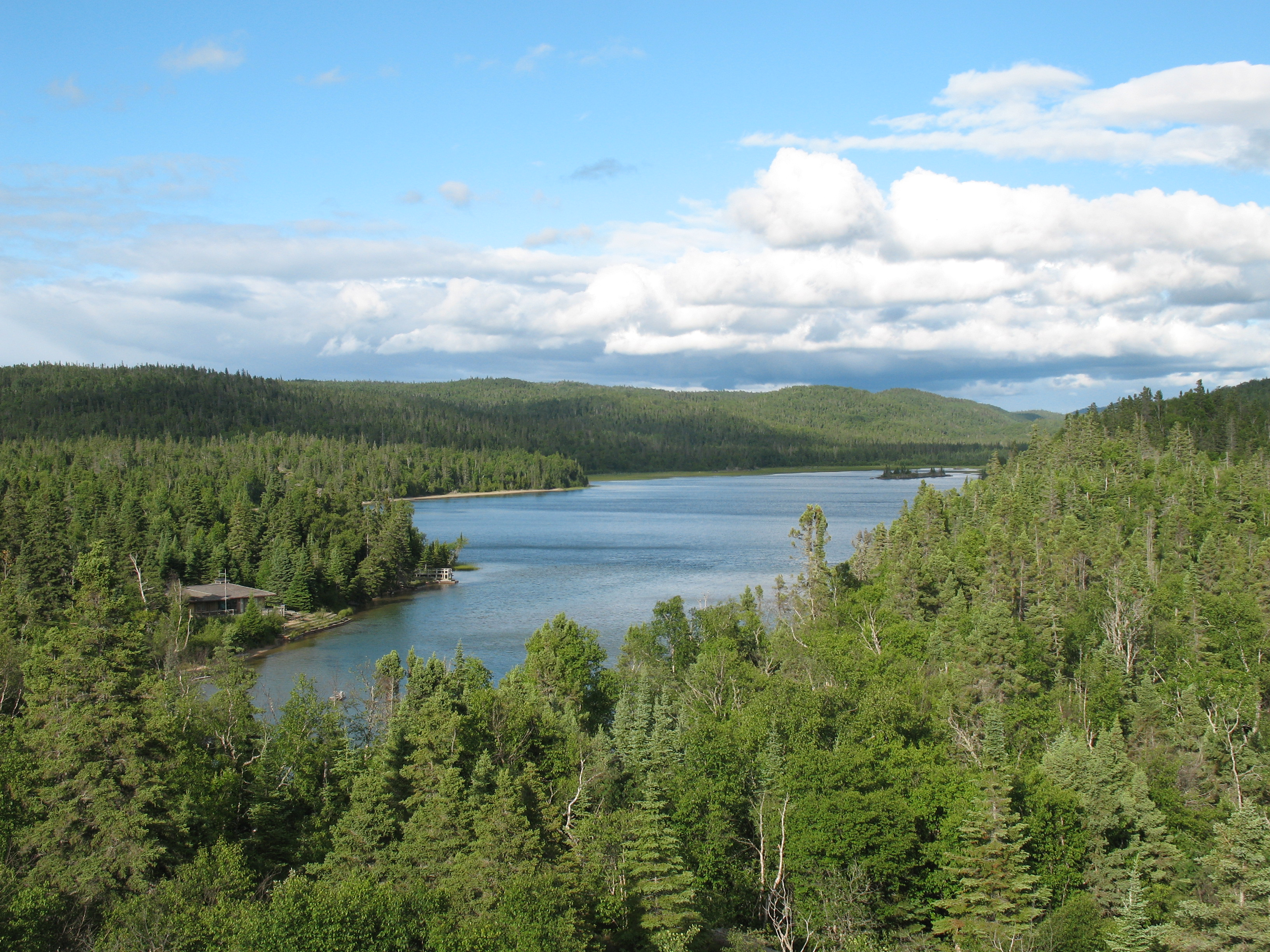
- Balsam fir-white spruce forest in Pukaskwa National Park, Ontario

Ecology
- Realm: Nearctic
- Biome: Boreal forests/taiga
- Borders: List: Eastern Canadian forests; Eastern Canadian Shield taiga; Eastern forest–boreal transition; Midwestern Canadian Shield forests; Southern Hudson Bay taiga; Western Great Lakes forests

Geography
- Area: 461,795 km^{2} (178,300 mi^{2})
- Country: Canada
- Provinces: Ontario; Quebec

Conservation
- Conservation status: Vulnerable

The Central Canadian Shield forests are a taiga ecoregion of Eastern Canada, as defined by the World Wildlife Fund (WWF) categorization system.

== Setting ==
This ecoregion consists of rolling hills, lakes, bogs and rocky outcrops covering a large curved swathe on the Canadian Shield from the Echoing River in Northern Ontario, running southeastwards through Thunder Bay District to the north shore of Lake Superior and then northeastwards into western Quebec. The area has a cool climate with summer temperatures averaging around 13°C dropping to a very cold -17°C in winter, with the hills around Lac Seul in northwestern Ontario being warmer and wetter than most of the area. Average rainfall in the eastern side of the ecoregion is 550mm per year, rising to 750mm in the centre (near Lake Nipigon for example), up to 900mm in the west. Specific areas include Lake Nipigon and Big Trout Lake (Ontario). These forest contrast with more severe boreal forest ecoregions such as the Eastern Canadian Shield taiga to the north, which covers most of Northern Quebec and Labrador.

== Flora ==
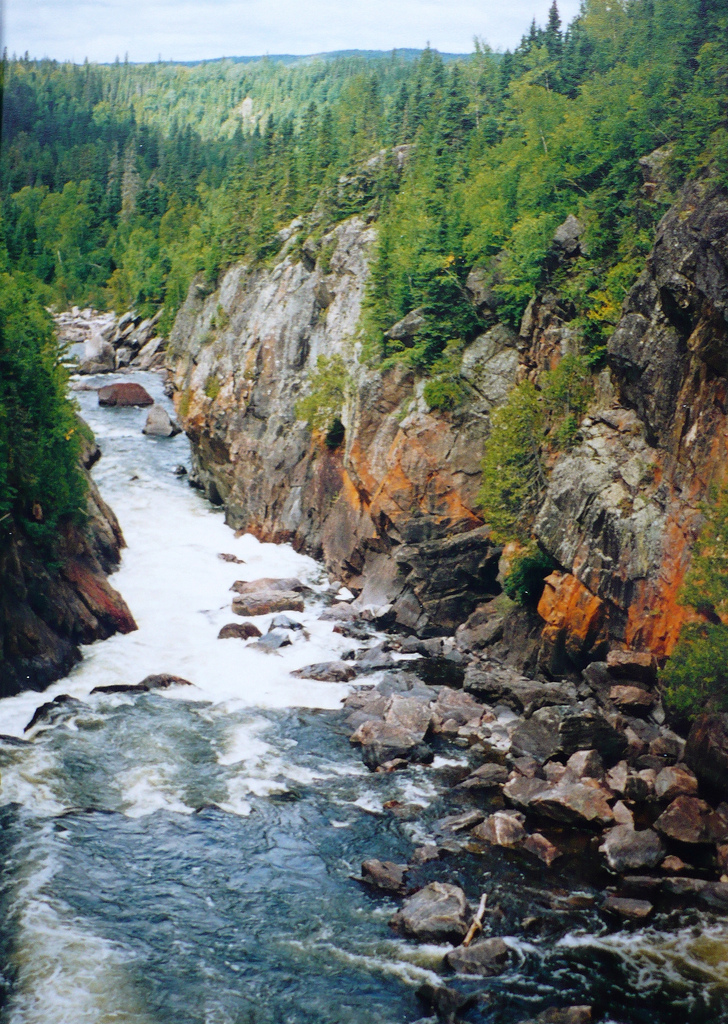
Pukaskwa National Park in Ontario.

These hills support a large area of rich taiga forest dominated by black spruce (Picea mariana) along with jack pine and some paper birch (Betula papyrifera) and in the warmer south-facing areas some trembling aspen (Populus tremuloides), white spruce (Picea glauca), Ontario balsam poplar (Populus balsamifera) and balsam fir (Abies balsamea). Many of the rocks of the area are covered with colourful lichens. The ecoregion contains large areas of wetland especially in the south east, and a greater variety of plant life on the north shore of Lake Superior.

== Fauna ==
Mammals of the taiga include moose (Alces alces), the southernmost populations of migratory woodland caribou (Rangifer tarandus caribou), American black bear (Ursus americanus), Canada lynx (Lynx canadensis), snowshoe hare (Lepus americanus) and grey wolf (Canis lupus). Birds of the area include northern hawk owl (Surnia ulula), great horned owl (Bubo virginianus), sharp-tailed grouse (Tympanuchus phasianellus), ruffed grouse (Bonasa umbellus), American black duck (Anas rubripes), wood duck (Aix sponsa), Canada goose (Branta canadensis) in the north, and hooded merganser (Lophodytes cucullatus) and pileated woodpecker (Dryocopus pileatus) in the west.

== Threats and preservation ==
This is fairly well-preserved ecoregion with 40% of original forest intact (less so in Manitoba) while most has been heavily changed by logging and in some areas by mining and hydroelectric power generation. Large blocks of undisturbed forest do remain, for example north of Lake Nipigon in Ontario and around Lake Mistassini in Quebec, and in the following protected areas: Wabakimi Provincial Park northwest of Lake Nipigon, Pukaskwa National Park near Marathon, Ontario on the Lake Superior shore, a number of rivers and lakes in Northern Ontario (Winisk River, Missinaibi River, Albany River north of Wabakimi Park, Severn River (northern Ontario), Attawapiskat Lake/Attawapiskat River and Brightsand River), Kesagami Provincial Park, Michipicoten Island in Lake Superior, all in Ontario; and Aiguebelle National Park in Quebec.

== See also ==
- List of ecoregions in Canada (WWF)
