= Île Rouleau crater =

Impact crater in Quebec, Canada

- Location within Canada Location within Quebec
- Location: Lake Mistassini, Baie-James, Nord-du-Québec, Quebec, Canada; 50°41′N 73°53′W

Impact crater structure
- Confidence: Confirmed
- Diameter: 4 km (2.5 mi)
- Age: <300 Ma; Permian or younger
- Exposed: Partly
- Drilled: No

Île Rouleau is an impact crater in Baie-James, Quebec, Canada, located on a small, uninhabited island in Lake Mistassini in the centre of the province.

The crater is 4 kilometres (2.5 mi) in diameter and the age is estimated to be less than 300 million years (Permian or younger). Part of the crater is exposed to the surface, but most of it is under the waters of the lake.
