= Gulf of St. Lawrence lowland forests =

Temperate broadleaf and mixed forest ecoregion of Canada and the United States

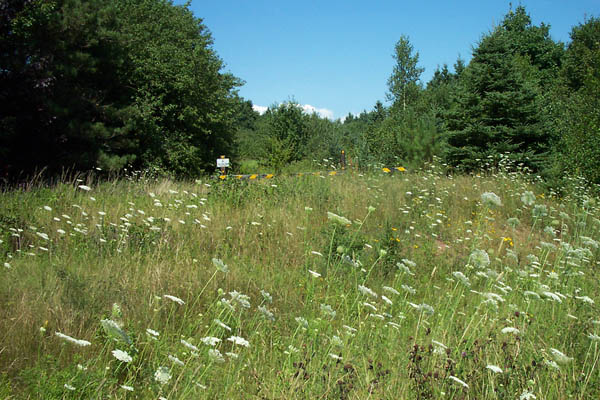
- Lowland forest along the Confederation Trail in Queens County, Prince Edward Island

Ecology
- Realm: Nearctic
- Biome: Temperate broadleaf and mixed forests
- Borders: Eastern Canadian forests; New England/Acadian forests
- Bird species: 191
- Mammal species: 46

Geography
- Area: 39,368 km^{2} (15,200 mi^{2})
- Country: Canada
- Provinces: New Brunswick; Nova Scotia; Prince Edward Island; Quebec

Conservation
- Habitat loss: 4.5%
- Protected: 2.9%

The Gulf of St. Lawrence lowland forests are a temperate broadleaf and mixed forest ecoregion of Eastern Canada, as defined by the World Wildlife Fund (WWF) categorization system.

== Setting ==
Located on the Gulf of Saint Lawrence, the world's largest estuary, this ecoregion covers all of Prince Edward Island, the Les Îles-de-la-Madeleine of Quebec, most of east-central New Brunswick, the Annapolis Valley, Minas Basin and the Northumberland Strait coast of Nova Scotia. This area has a coastal climate of warm summers and cold and snowy winters with an average annual temperature of around 5 °C going up to 15 °C in summer, the coast is warmer than the islands or the sheltered inland valleys.

== Flora ==
The colder climate allows more hardwood trees to grow in the Gulf of St Lawrence than in most of this part of northeast North America. Trees of the region include eastern hemlock (Tsuga canadensis), balsam fir (Abies balsamea), American elm (Ulmus americana), black ash (Fraxinus nigra), eastern white pine (Pinus strobus), red maple (Acer rubrum), northern red oak (Quercus rubra), black spruce (Picea mariana), red spruce (Picea rubens) and white spruce (Picea glauca).

== Fauna ==
The forests are home to a variety of wildlife including American black bear (Ursus americanus), moose (Alces alces), white-tailed deer (Odocoileus virginianus), red fox (Vulpes vulpes), snowshoe hare (Lepus americanus), North American porcupine (Erithyzon dorsatum), fisher (Martes pennanti), North American beaver (Castor canadensis), bobcat (Lynx rufus), American marten (Martes americana), raccoon (Procyon lotor) and muskrat (Ondatra zibethica). The area is habitat for maritime ringlet butterflies (Coenonympha nipisiquit) and other invertebrates. Birds include many seabirds, a large colony of great blue heron (Ardea herodias), the largest remaining population of the endangered piping plover, and one of the largest colonies of double-crested cormorant (Phalacrocorax auritus) in the world.

== Threats and preservation ==
Most of this ecoregion has been altered by logging and clearance for agriculture with only 3% of the original habitat remaining and that highly fragmented. The only large block of intact habitat remains in the area around Kouchibouguac National Park in New Brunswick, although even here logging is ongoing.

== See also ==
- List of ecoregions in Canada (WWF)
