= Eastern Canadian Shield taiga =

Taiga ecoregion of Labrador and Quebec, Canada

Coordinates: 55°N 68°W

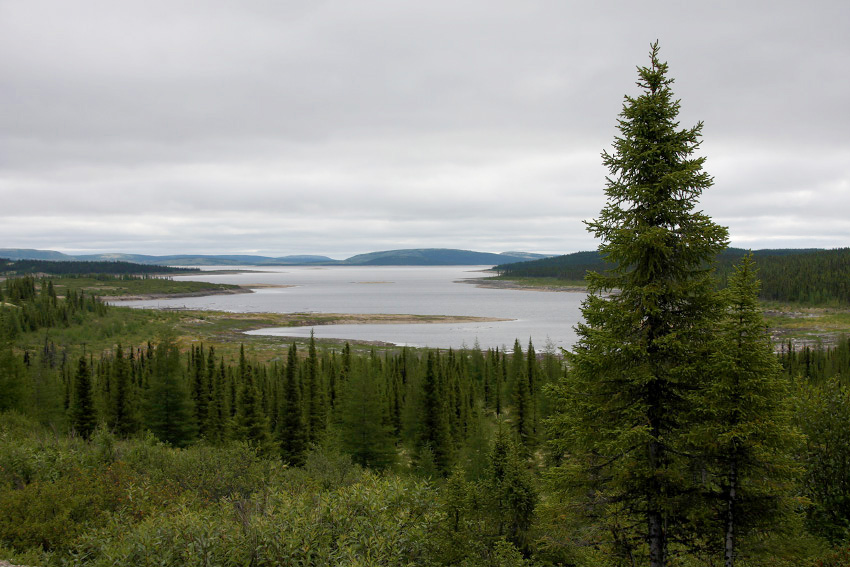
- Taiga along the shores of Caniapiscau Reservoir

Ecology
- Realm: Nearctic
- Biome: Boreal forests/taiga
- Borders: List: Central Canadian Shield forests; Eastern Canadian forests; Low Arctic tundra; Southern Hudson Bay taiga; Torngat Mountain tundra
- Bird species: 99
- Mammal species: 34

Geography
- Area: 754,169 km^{2} (291,186 mi^{2})
- Country: Canada
- Provinces: Quebec; Newfoundland and Labrador

Conservation
- Conservation status: Relatively stable/intact
- Global 200: Yes
- Habitat loss: 0%
- Protected: 26,540 km^{2} (4%)

The Eastern Canadian Shield taiga is an ecoregion of Canada as defined by the World Wildlife Fund (WWF) categorization system.

== Setting ==
Located in northeastern Canada, this ecoregion covers a large part of northern Quebec and most of Labrador, reaching from Hudson Bay and James Bay in the west, across to Ungava Bay and east to the Atlantic Ocean coast of Labrador. This is a taiga ecoregion and therefore stops at the treeline, beyond which is tundra. This is a rugged rocky landscape including an area of fjords on the Atlantic coast of Labrador. The hills and plateaus are dotted with many lakes and string bogs, and patches of tundra on the Mealy Mountains and elsewhere.

This is a cold part of the world with average annual temperatures ranging from −6°C in Hudson Bay to 1°C on the Labrador coast.

== Flora ==
The dominant trees of the taiga are black spruce (Picea mariana) and tamarack (Larix laricina), mixed with smaller numbers of white spruce (Picea glauca), dwarf birches, willows, blueberries, and rhododendrons. The boglands are a habitat of sedges and sphagnum moss.

== Fauna ==
The ecoregion is home to wildlife including caribou, moose (Alces alces), American black bear (Ursus americanus), grey wolf (Canis lupus), red fox (Vulpes vulpes), Arctic fox (Alopex lagopus), wolverine (Gulo gulo), snowshoe hare (Lepus americanus) and colonies of seals. Of particular interest are the inland (and therefore freshwater) harbor seals of Lacs des Loups Marins and the world's largest herd of caribou, the George River herd of, in 1986, up to 472,000 animals, which has since declined to around 8,000 animals. Birds include grouse, osprey (Pandion haliaetus), raven (Corvus corax) and many waterbirds. In particular the rocky coast is home to breeding colonies of seabirds, including the endangered eastern population of the harlequin duck and is also on the Atlantic Flyway migratory route for birds.

== Threats and preservation ==
This ecoregion is almost entirely in its natural state, apart from some areas damaged by hydro-electric power generation projects and mining activities such as the Voisey's Bay Mine. There are no substantial protected areas although the proposed Mealy Mountains National Park Reserve will be the largest park in Atlantic Canada and other parks are proposed for Richmond Gulf and the Clearwater Lakes on Hudson Bay, and Atikonak Lake on the Quebec–Labrador border.

== See also ==
- List of ecoregions in Canada (WWF)
- Eastern Canadian Shield Taiga One Earth
