= Eastern forest–boreal transition =

Temperate broadleaf and mixed forest ecoregion in Canada and the United States

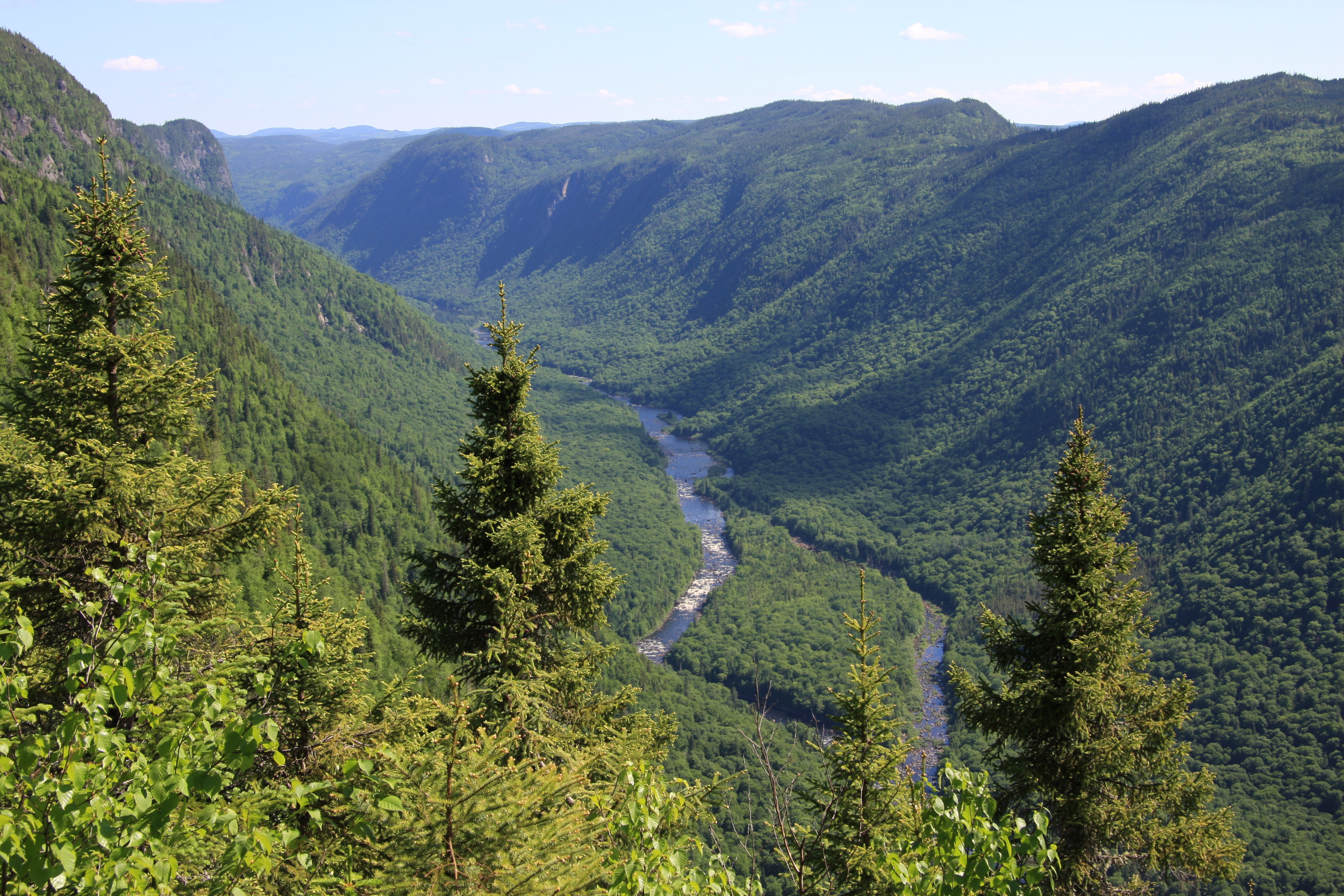
- Jacques-Cartier National Park in Quebec

Ecology
- Realm: Nearctic
- Biome: Temperate broadleaf and mixed forests, Hemiboreal/boreal forests
- Borders: Eastern Canadian forests; Eastern Great Lakes lowland forests; Central Canadian Shield forests; Western Great Lakes forests
- Bird species: 204
- Mammal species: 58

Geography
- Countries: Canada; United States
- States/Provinces: New York; Ontario; Quebec
- Climate type: Humid continental (Dfb)

Conservation
- Conservation status: Vulnerable
- Habitat loss: 2.5%
- Protected: 9.2%

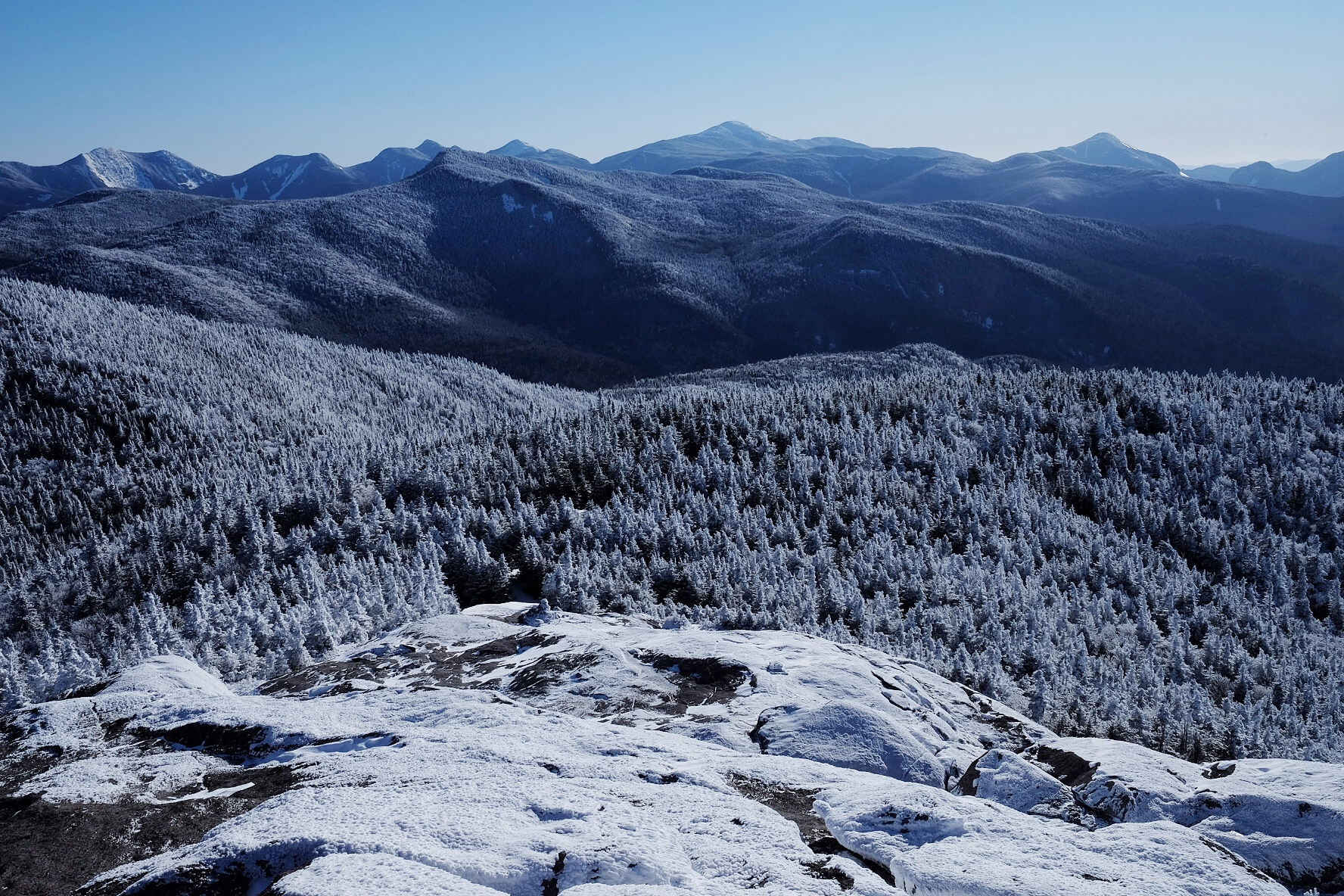
The heavily traversed Adirondack Mountains of Upstate New York form the southernmost part of the Eastern forest-boreal transition ecoregion, constituting part of the world's taiga biome.

The eastern forest–boreal transition is a boreal, temperate broadleaf and mixed forests ecoregion of North America, primarily in Eastern Canada and the Adirondack Mountains of (Upstate) New York. It is a transitional zone or region between the predominantly coniferous Boreal Forest and the mostly deciduous broadleaf forest region further south.

== Location and climate ==
The ecoregion includes most of the southern Canadian Shield in Ontario and Quebec north and west of the Saint Lawrence River lowlands. The portion in Northeastern Ontario includes the eastern shores of Lake Superior, Greater Sudbury, North Bay, Ontario, Lake Nipissing, the Clay Belt and Temagami. Areas in Central Ontario include Muskoka, Parry Sound, Algonquin Park, and Haliburton. The Quebec portion takes in Lake Timiskaming, the southern Laurentian Mountains, Quebec City, the Saguenay River, and Saguenay, Quebec. There is a separate southern section of the ecoregion in the Adirondack Mountains of Upstate New York, United States. However the higher elevations of the Laurentian Mountains and the northern Appalachian Mountains in Canada constitute the Eastern Canadian forests ecoregion.

The region has a humid continental climate (Dfb) consisting of warm summers and cold, snowy winters, and is warmer towards the south.

== Flora ==
The flora in this ecoregion varies considerably based upon soil conditions and elevation. These mixed forests are distinct from the deciduous forests south of the Canadian Shield and the cooler boreal forests to the north.

=== Conifer swamp ===
Conifer swamps occur in areas of seasonal flooding. Trees can be very dense or sparse; mats of sphagnum moss cover the ground. Black spruce (Picea mariana) and tamarack (Larix laricina) are the predominant tree species. Where the soil is not saturated year round grows northern white cedar (Thuja occidentalis). Speckled alder (Alnus incana) grows around the edges of these swamps and red spruce (Picea rubens) and white pine (Pinus strobus) grow on higher, drier ground.

=== Lowland conifer forests ===
Lowland conifer forests occur on flats, low ridges, and knolls near bodies of water. They are dominated by balsam fir (Abies balsamea) and red spruce (Picea rubens), although white pine (Pinus strobus), red pine (Pinus resinosa) and jack pine (Pinus banksiana) and paper birch (Betula papyrifera) also occur. The ground is often stony with little vegetation.

=== Hardwood–conifer mixed forests ===
Hardwood–conifer mixed forests occur in a transition zone between lowland conifer and northern hardwood forests. The ground is less rocky than in the lowland conifer forests and thus supports more vegetation. Trees include red spruce, balsam fir, eastern hemlock (Tsuga canadensis), red maple (Acer rubrum), and yellow birch (Betula alleghaniensis). The understory vegetation is abundant, with witch hobble (Viburnum lantanoides), honeysuckle (Lonicera spp.), and striped maple (Acer pensylvanicum). The herbaceous layer include common wood sorrel (Oxalis spp.), bunchberry (Cornus canadensis), yellow clintonia (Clintonia borealis), ferns, and mosses.

=== Northern hardwood forests ===
Northern hardwood forests occur on the richest, most productive soils. Sugar maple (Acer saccharum), American beech (Fagus grandifolia), and yellow birch are the predominant tree species. In secondary forests, red spruce, white pine, white ash (Fraxinus americana), eastern hemlock, black cherry (Prunus serotina), and red maple are present. Witch hobble (Viburnum lantanoides) is a common understory shrub. Ferns and clubmosses grow in the herbaceous layer, along with numerous species of spring-flowering forbs.

=== Upper slope hardwood–conifer mixed forests ===
Upper slope hardwood–conifer mixed forests are an area of transition between the northern hardwood and the mountain conifer forests. They are similar to hardwood–conifer forests, but with no red maple. Red spruce and eastern hemlock, together with sugar maple, yellow birch, and American beech are the dominant species, with scattered white pine.

=== Mountain conifer forests ===
Red spruce and balsam fir are common at lower elevations of the mountain conifer forests. Hardwoods that grow among the conifers include paper birch, yellow birch, and American mountain-ash (Sorbus americana). With increasing elevation, balsam fir becomes more abundant. Near treeline, black spruce joins balsam fir in the krummholz. Herbaceous plants include wood sorrel, bunchberry, yellow clintonia, and spinulose woodfern (Dryopteris carthusiana). Mosses and lichens cover exposed rocks.

=== Alpine ===
Rocks are exposed and covered with lichens and mosses. Low-lying plants more common in the tundra to the north grow here. They include gold-colored deer's hair (Trichophorum cespitosum), alpine bilberry (Vaccinium uliginosum), lapland rosebay (Rhododendron lapponicum), bearberry willow (Salix uva-ursi), mountain sandwort (Minuartia groenlandica), and alpine holy grass (Hierochloe alpina). In the Adirondacks, these communities are limited to 85 acres (34 ha) on 11 peaks.

== Fauna ==
Old-growth forest such as the pinewoods found in this ecoregion are home to a complex variety of long-established wildlife including many invertebrates and reptiles and birds such as American black duck (Anas rubripes), wood duck (Aix sponsa), hooded merganser (Lophodytes cucullatus), and pileated woodpecker (Dryocopus pileatus).

Mammals found here include the moose (Alces alces), American black bear (Ursus americanus), Canada lynx (Lynx canadensis), snowshoe hare (Lepus americanus), eastern wolf (Canis lycaon), coyote (Canis latrans), North American porcupine (Erethizon dorsatum), and white-tailed deer (Odocoileus virginianus). Extirpated mammals include the boreal woodland caribou (Rangifer tarandus caribou), eastern elk (Cervus canadensis canadensis), wolverine (Gulo gulo) and eastern cougar (Puma concolor couguar).

The Lake Nipissing area in particular is home to eastern chipmunk (Tamias striatus), mourning dove (Zenaida macroura), northern cardinal (Cardinalis cardinalis), and wood thrush (Hylocichla mustelina).

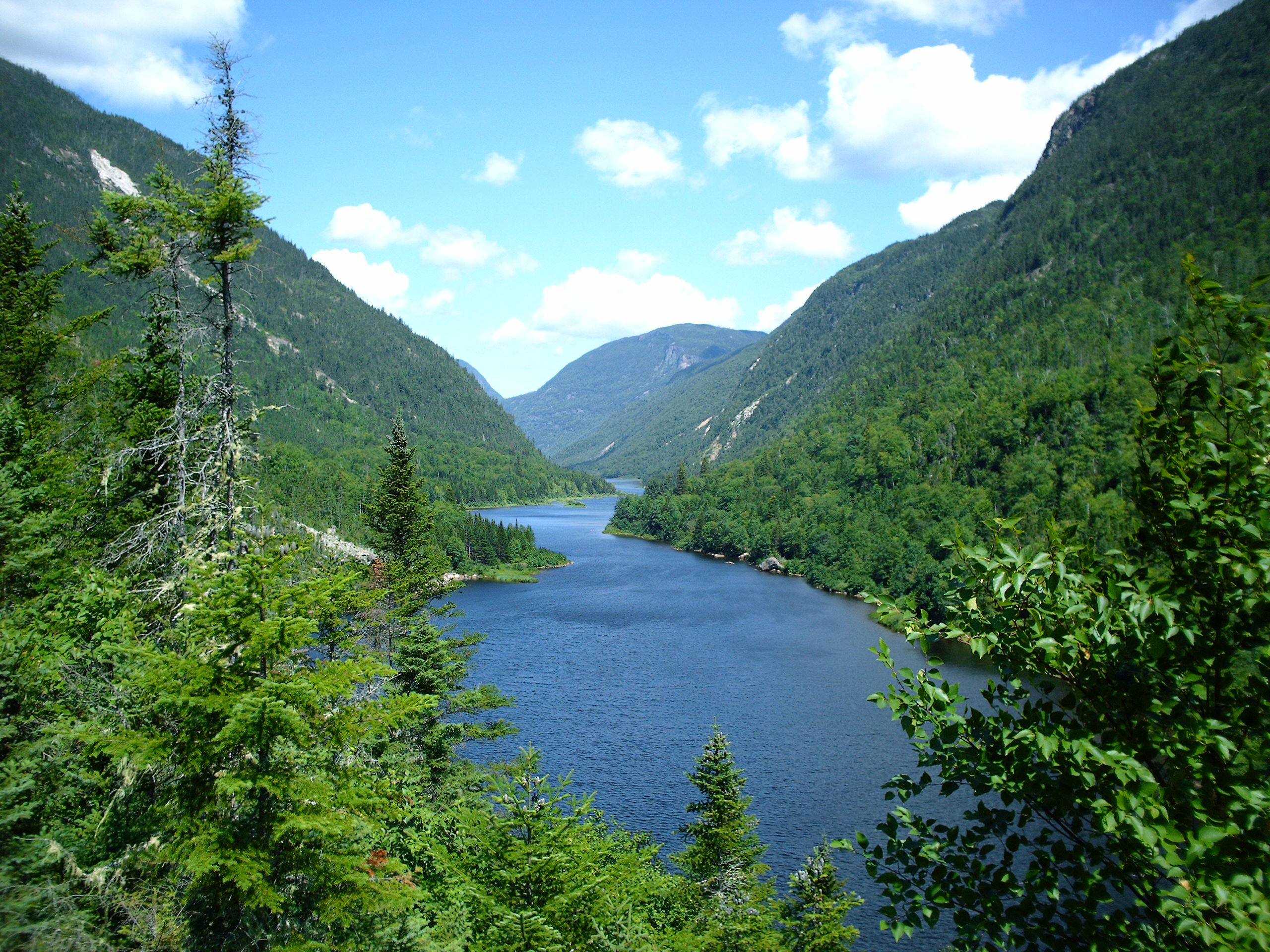
Hautes-Gorges-de-la-Rivière-Malbaie National Park in Quebec.

== Threats and preservation ==
These forests have been severely damaged by centuries of clearance for timber, roads, agricultural and urban development. This development now includes ski facilities, while logging and mining are ongoing. Protected areas include: Papineau-Labelle Wildlife Reserve, Mont-Tremblant, Jacques-Cartier, Hautes-Gorges-de-la-Rivière-Malbaie and La Mauricie National Parks in Quebec; Algonquin Provincial Park, Lake Superior Provincial Park, Lady Evelyn-Smoothwater Provincial Park, French River Provincial Park, Killarney Provincial Park, Daisy Lake Uplands Provincial Park, and a number of parks in Algoma District in Ontario; and Adirondack Park in New York. Adirondack Park contains the largest areas of original red pine and eastern white pine in the world and one of the largest areas of original forest in the United States, the Five Ponds Wilderness Area.

== See also ==
- List of ecoregions in Canada (WWF)
- List of ecoregions in the United States (WWF)
