= Geography of Alberta =

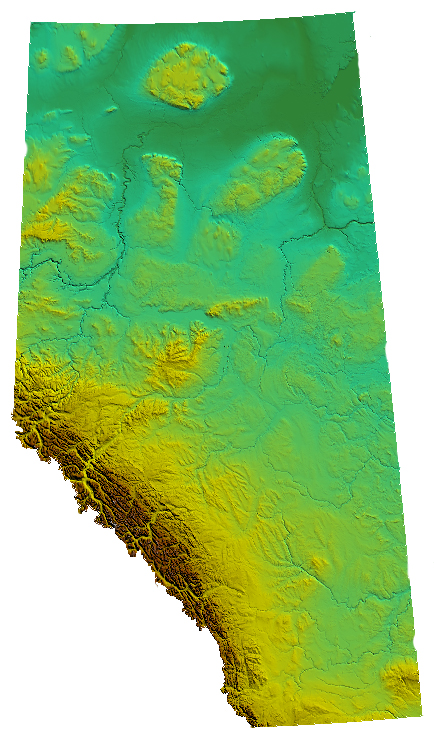
- Continent: North America
- Region: Western Canada; Canadian Prairies
- Coordinates: 54°59′30″N 114°22′36″W
- Area: Ranked 6th among provinces and territories
  - Total: 661,848 km^{2} (255,541 sq mi)
  - Land: 97.05%
  - Water: 2.95%
- Coastline: 0 km (0 mi)
- Borders: Total land borders: United States Montana; Canada British Columbia, Saskatchewan and Northwest Territories
- Highest point: Mount Columbia; 3,747 m (12,293 ft)
- Lowest point: Slave River; 210 m (690 ft)
- Longest river: Athabasca River; 1,231 km (765 mi)
- Largest lake: Lake Athabasca; 2,295 km (1,426 mi)

Alberta is one of the thirteen provinces and territories of Canada. Located in Western Canada, the province has an area of 661,190 km^{2} (255,290 sq mi) and is bounded to the south by the United States state of Montana along 49° north for 298 km (185 mi); to the east at 110° west by the province of Saskatchewan for 1,223 km (760 mi); and at 60° north the Northwest Territories for 644 km (400 mi). The southern half of the province borders British Columbia along the Continental Divide of the Americas on the peaks of the Rocky Mountains, while the northern half borders British Columbia along the 120th meridian west. Along with Saskatchewan it is one of only two landlocked provinces or territories.

== Terrain ==
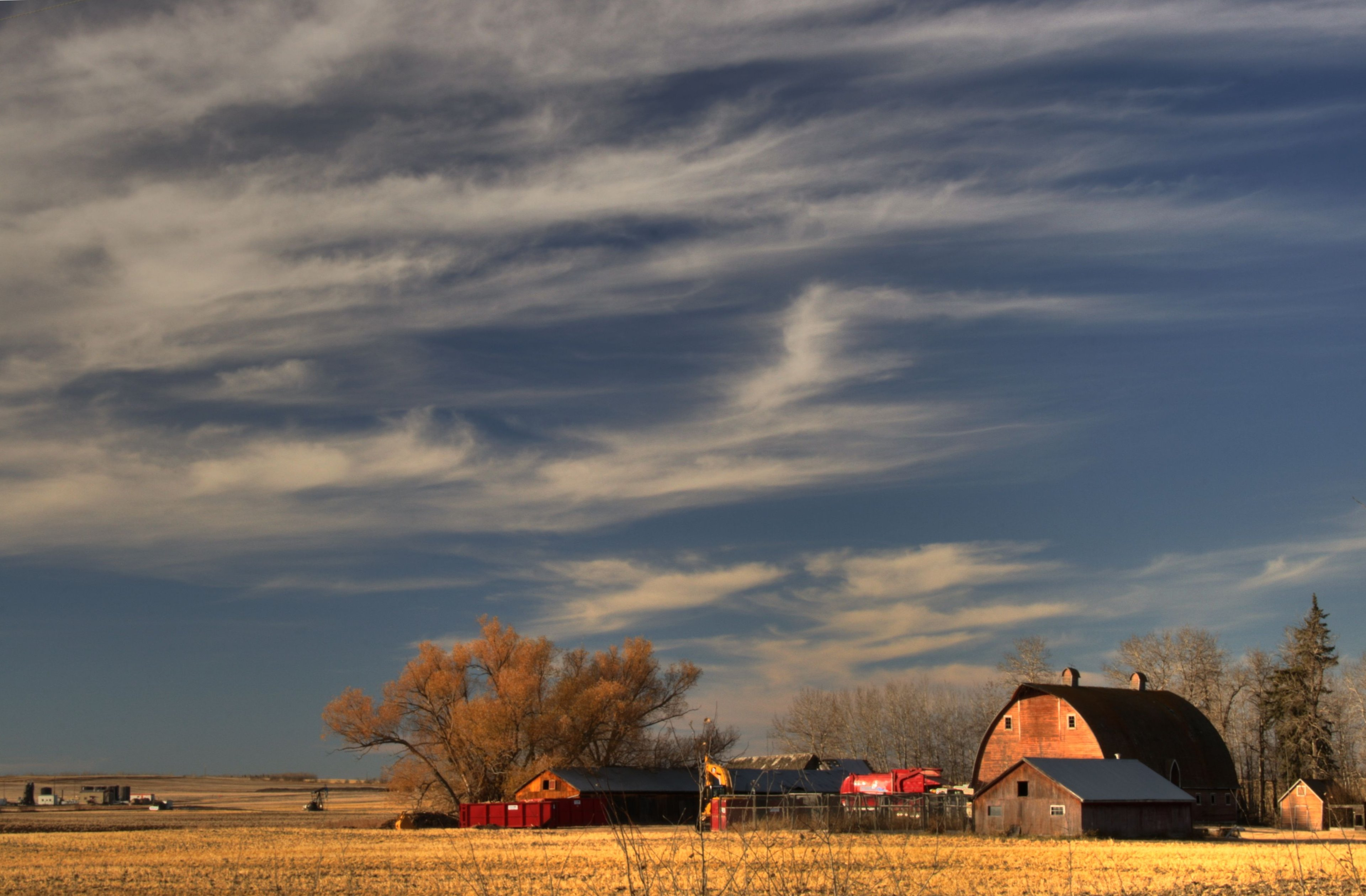
Grain farm on prairie northwest of Edmonton, Alberta.

Alberta's landscape is marked by the impact of the Wisconsin Glaciation, about 75,000 to 11,000 years ago, when the entire future province was covered in ice. As the ice sheet receded, the landscape was changed, and large amounts of glacial till were left behind.

The southern portion consists chiefly of plains that are almost entirely treeless. As the slopes of the Rocky Mountains to the west are reached, more trees are found until in the foothills of the mountains, bodies of forest timber occur. Trees also become more numerous in the northern part of the province, until in the region north of the North Saskatchewan River continuous forests are met with again. From the southern boundary line for 2.5° north the prairie is dry, but of good soil, which grows excellent crops when irrigated. North of this region, the surface of the province is of the most fertile soil, with ordinary rainfall sufficing for agriculture. Alberta also has large oil reserves, especially in the Athabasca oil sands in the north of the province.

The appearance of the prairie section of the province is that of undulating grasslands, with rounded sloping ridges covered with shorter grasses, which serve for the support of large herds of beef cattle. The wooded portions of the terrain are dotted with clumps and belts of trees of moderate size, giving them a park-like appearance. In winter it is generally very cold, but this is occasionally reduced by a warm wind from the west, known as the Chinook.

In 1986, Agriculture Canada published a map listing the following physiographic regions to be present at least partially within Alberta:

- Canadian Shield
  - Kazan Upland
  - Athabasca Plain
- Interior Plains
  - Northern Plains
  - Saskatchewan Plains
  - Northern Alberta Lowlands
  - Eastern Alberta Plains
  - Western Alberta Plains
  - Northern Alberta Uplands
  - Southern Alberta Uplands
- Cordilleran Region
  - Rocky Mountain Foothills
  - Rocky Mountains

== Mountains ==
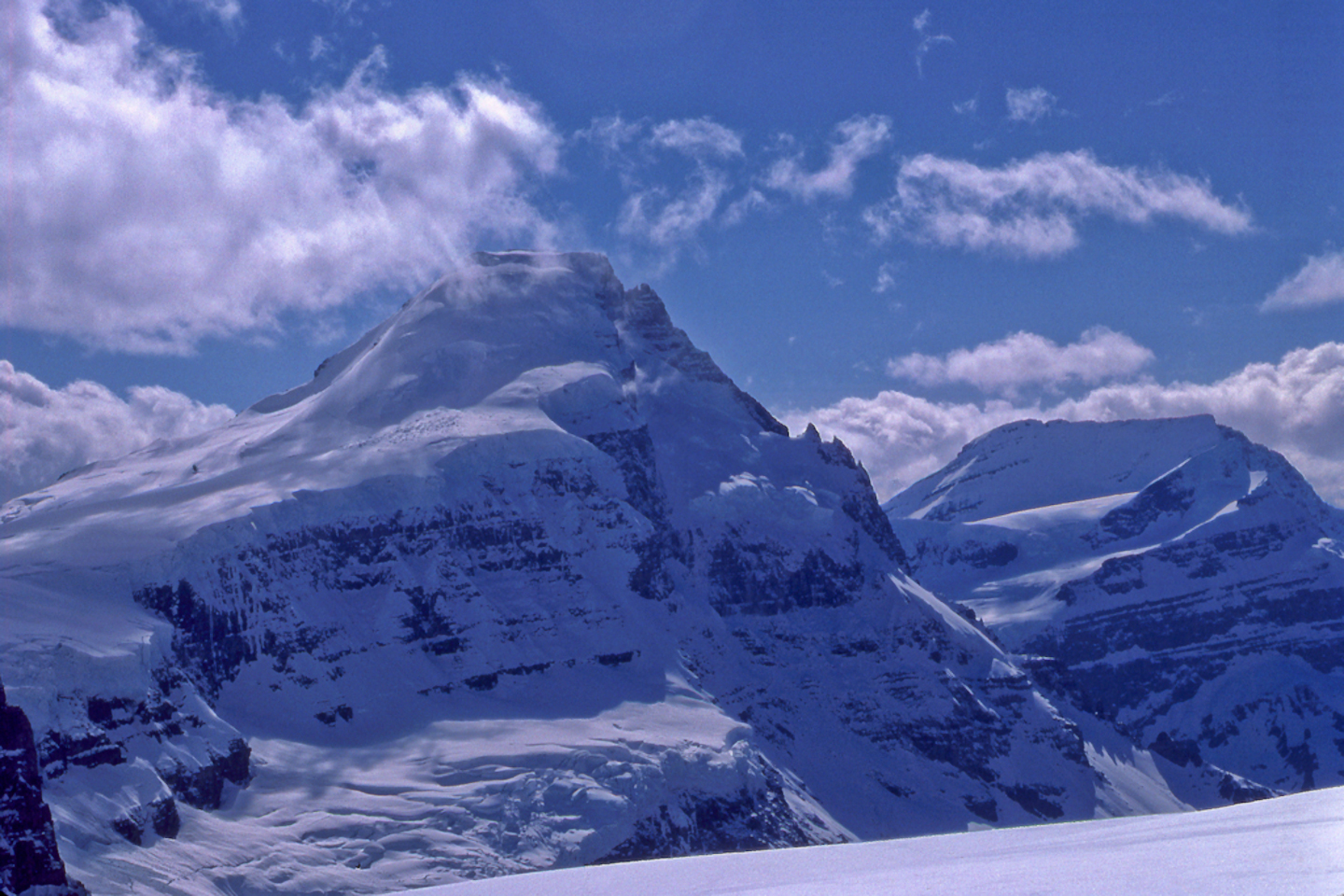
Mount Columbia and King Edward in background

From a distance of about 100 km (62 mi) the mountains are constantly in view in clear weather. They appear as a line of snowy peaks along the western horizon. This continues for hundreds of kilometres northwestward. The Canadian Rockies are ascended by a gradual approach from the east, but are exceedingly abrupt on their transalpine slope in British Columbia. The peaks of these mountains are majestic, many of them reaching a height of more than 3,000 m (9,800 ft) above the sea. Among the more notable of these are:

1. Mount Columbia – 3,747 m (12,293 ft)
2. Twin Peaks massif – 3,684 m (12,087 ft)
3. Mount Alberta – 3,619 m (11,873 ft)
4. Mount Forbes – 3,612 m (11,850 ft)
5. Mount Temple – 3,543 m (11,624 ft)
6. Mount Brazeau – 3,525 m (11,565 ft)
7. Snow Dome – 3,520 m (11,550 ft)
8. Mount Lyell – 3,504 m (11,496 ft)
9. Mount Kitchener – 3,505 m (11,499 ft)
10. Mount Hungabee – 3,492 m (11,457 ft)

Historical travelling through these mountains was difficult, and alpine passes became very important. The most noted of the Alberta passes are:

- The Crowsnest Pass, near the southern boundary line, through which a branch of the Canadian Pacific Railway runs.
- The Kicking Horse Pass, through which the main line of the Canadian Pacific Railway was built; 130 km (80 mi) from the eastern end of this pass is the gate of Banff National Park, with the famous touristic town of Banff as its centre.
- The Yellowhead Pass, running west from the Athabasca River; this pass was discovered by John Palliser (1858), was crossed by the first tourists, William Wentworth-Fitzwilliam, Viscount Milton and Walter Butler Cheadle, in 1861, and by Sandford Fleming (1871–1872) in the Ocean to Ocean expedition;

The Caribou Mountains are not part of the Canadian Rockies, but are located in northern Alberta, constituting an elevated plateau in the northern plains. They reach an altitude of 1,030 m (3,380 ft), almost 700 m (2,300 ft) higher than the surrounding area.

While not considered mountains, the Cypress Hills in southern Alberta, on the Saskatchewan border, form the highest point between the Rocky Mountains and Labrador. They reach a maximum elevation of 1,468 m (4,816 ft), 600 m (2,000 ft) above the surrounding prairie.

== Water ==
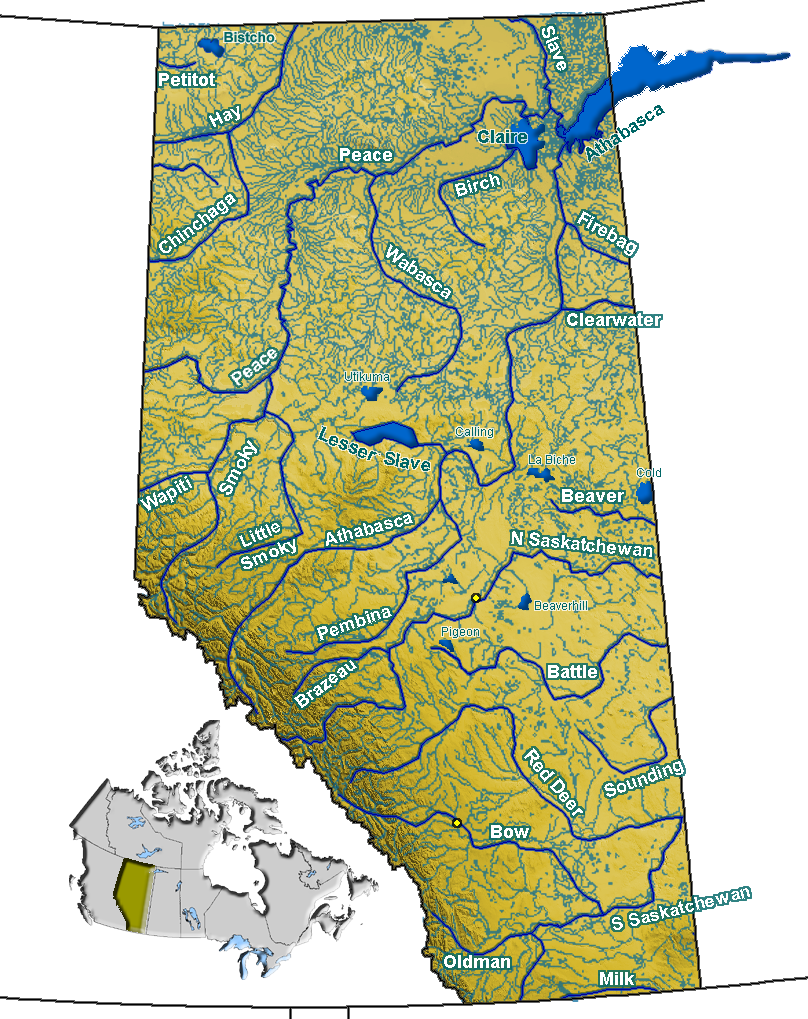
Hydrographic network of Alberta

With the exception of the southern section, the province of Alberta is well watered. Rising from numerous valleys on the Alberta declivity of the Rocky Mountains between the international boundary line and 52° north are streams which unite to form the Oldman River, and farther north the Bow River. Running eastward these two rivers unite about 112° west, and flow on under the name of the South Saskatchewan River. North of 52° north many small streams unite to form the Red Deer River, which flowing southeastward joins the South Saskatchewan near 110° west. Between 52° and 53° north rises the great river, the North Saskatchewan River. It receives a southern tributary, the Battle River, which joins it about 108° west. Pursuing their courses eastward the North and South Saskatchewan rivers unite in the Saskatchewan River (Cree: kisiskāciwani-sīpiy, "swift flowing river"), which finds its way to Lake Winnipeg, and thence by way of Nelson River to Hudson Bay. It is one of the mightiest rivers of the continent.

At Mount Athabasca, there is an unusual occurrence where the water flows either to the Pacific Ocean on the western slope, the Arctic Ocean on the northeast, and Hudson Bay on the southeast.

In the northern part of the province, between 53° and 54° north, all the waters of Alberta flow toward the Arctic Ocean. Starting at Mount Athabasca, the Athabasca River runs north and empties into Lake Athabasca near 58° north. North of 56° north flows through and from the Rocky Mountains as the Peace River. After descending northeastward to within a few miles of Lake Athabasca, it is met by a stream emerging from that lake. The united river carrying down the waters of the Athabasca slope is called the Slave River, which, passing through Great Slave Lake, emerges as the great Mackenzie River, which flows into the Arctic Ocean. Alberta thus gives rise to the two great rivers, the Saskatchewan and the Mackenzie.

While a number of fresh water, or in some cases brackish, lakes each less than 260 km^{2} (100 sq mi) in extent are situated in Alberta, two of more considerable size are found. These are Lake Athabasca, 7,898 km^{2} (3,049 sq mi) in extent, of which the greater part is in Saskatchewan, and the other Lesser Slave Lake 1,168 km^{2} (451 sq mi) in area.

== Climate ==
Köppen climate types in Alberta

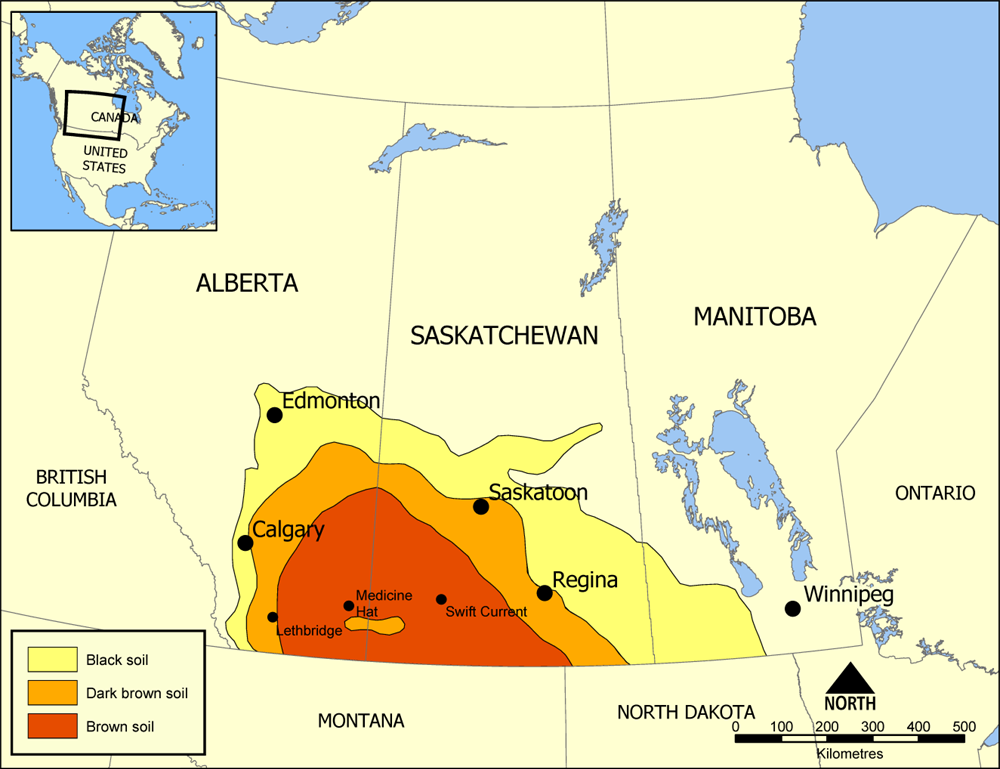
Map of Palliser's Triangle.

As Alberta extends for approximately 1,200 km (750 mi) from north to south, it is natural that the climate should vary considerably between parallels of 49° and 60° north and also between approximately 110° and 120° west. It is also further influenced by the different altitudes found in the province.

In general, Alberta's climate is dry, due to the rain shadow effect of the Rocky Mountains and Pacific Coast Ranges to the west, and continental, due to its distance from any large body of water. The contrast between warming, dry winds descending from the Rockies and proximate cold air in Yukon, however, gives Alberta (and the adjacent Mackenzie Basin) during the winter the highest variability in monthly temperatures anywhere in the world. Exceptionally warm winter months in the province can be as warm as oceanic climates at similar latitudes – for instance Edmonton averaged 1.1 °C (34.0 °F) in February 1977 – whereas the coldest winter months like January 1950 when Edmonton averaged −27.8 °C (−18.0 °F) are comparably cold to such Siberian localities as Aldan, Sakha.

=== Southern Alberta ===
Most of Southern Alberta east of the Rockies and outside of the Cypress Hills, especially Palliser's Triangle, is a dry steppe, with most locations having an annual average precipitation of 280–430 millimetres (11–17 inches). Under the Köppen climate classification, most places in Southern Alberta are either semi-arid (Köppen climate classification BSk), or humid continental (Köppen climate classification Dfb) (the "humid" designation denotes that these climates do not meet the criteria to be semi-arid, not that they necessarily have high humidity levels). Most places in Southern Alberta that fall under the "humid continental" classification are close to the borderline between semi-arid and humid continental. The other climates in this area are semi-monsoonal humid continental (Koppen: Dwb) located around Calgary, or subarctic (Koppen: Dfc) located in high elevation areas and the Cypress Hills. This region has the hottest summer temperatures in Alberta and quite cold winters, though chinook winds ameliorate the cold winter temperatures temporarily when they pass over. The natural vegetation of this region is mainly dry mixed grass prairie, grading to mixed grass prairie, and then fescue prairie as precipitation increases with higher altitude and / or latitude. This area is prone to drought and farming here is not successful without significant irrigation.

Climate data for Calgary (Calgary International Airport) WMO ID: 71877; coordinates 51°06′50″N 114°01′13″W; elevation: 1,084.1 m (3,557 ft); 1991–2020 normals, extremes 1881–present
Month	Jan	Feb	Mar	Apr	May	Jun	Jul	Aug	Sep	Oct	Nov	Dec	Year
Record high humidex	17.3	21.9	25.2	27.2	31.6	37.0	36.9	36.4	32.9	28.7	22.6	19.4	37.0
Record high °C (°F)	17.6 (63.7)	22.6 (72.7)	25.4 (77.7)	29.4 (84.9)	32.4 (90.3)	36.3 (97.3)	36.3 (97.3)	36.7 (98.1)	33.3 (91.9)	29.4 (84.9)	23.1 (73.6)	19.5 (67.1)	36.7 (98.1)
Mean maximum °C (°F)	12.0 (53.6)	12.5 (54.5)	16.2 (61.2)	22.0 (71.6)	26.4 (79.5)	27.6 (81.7)	30.8 (87.4)	31.5 (88.7)	28.3 (82.9)	22.5 (72.5)	15.6 (60.1)	11.2 (52.2)	32.4 (90.3)
Mean daily maximum °C (°F)	−1.5 (29.3)	0.1 (32.2)	3.8 (38.8)	10.8 (51.4)	16.4 (61.5)	19.7 (67.5)	23.5 (74.3)	23.1 (73.6)	18.3 (64.9)	11.1 (52.0)	4.1 (39.4)	−0.4 (31.3)	10.8 (51.4)
Daily mean °C (°F)	−7.6 (18.3)	−5.9 (21.4)	−2.2 (28.0)	4.5 (40.1)	9.9 (49.8)	13.7 (56.7)	16.9 (62.4)	16.2 (61.2)	11.5 (52.7)	4.9 (40.8)	−1.7 (28.9)	−6.3 (20.7)	4.5 (40.1)
Mean daily minimum °C (°F)	−13.5 (7.7)	−11.8 (10.8)	−8.1 (17.4)	−1.9 (28.6)	3.4 (38.1)	7.7 (45.9)	10.2 (50.4)	9.2 (48.6)	4.7 (40.5)	−1.3 (29.7)	−7.5 (18.5)	−12.1 (10.2)	−1.8 (28.8)
Mean minimum °C (°F)	−27.9 (−18.2)	−23.3 (−9.9)	−21.0 (−5.8)	−10.4 (13.3)	−3.5 (25.7)	2.2 (36.0)	5.1 (41.2)	3.7 (38.7)	−1.9 (28.6)	−11.0 (12.2)	−19.8 (−3.6)	−24.6 (−12.3)	−31.6 (−24.9)
Record low °C (°F)	−44.4 (−47.9)	−45 (−49)	−37.2 (−35.0)	−30 (−22)	−16.7 (1.9)	−3.3 (26.1)	−0.6 (30.9)	−3.2 (26.2)	−13.3 (8.1)	−25.7 (−14.3)	−35 (−31)	−42.8 (−45.0)	−45 (−49)
Record low wind chill	−52.1	−52.6	−44.7	−37.1	−23.7	−5.8	0.0	−4.1	−12.5	−34.3	−47.9	−55.1	−55.1
Average precipitation mm (inches)	10.0 (0.39)	11.8 (0.46)	17.7 (0.70)	29.6 (1.17)	61.1 (2.41)	112.7 (4.44)	65.7 (2.59)	53.8 (2.12)	37.1 (1.46)	17.1 (0.67)	16.3 (0.64)	12.5 (0.49)	445.4 (17.54)
Average rainfall mm (inches)	0.1 (0.00)	0.1 (0.00)	1.1 (0.04)	12.6 (0.50)	52.5 (2.07)	112.5 (4.43)	65.7 (2.59)	53.5 (2.11)	33.8 (1.33)	8.3 (0.33)	1.7 (0.07)	0.3 (0.01)	342.2 (13.47)
Average snowfall cm (inches)	16.6 (6.5)	16.9 (6.7)	23.8 (9.4)	22.9 (9.0)	9.6 (3.8)	0.2 (0.1)	0.0 (0.0)	0.0 (0.0)	2.2 (0.9)	11.5 (4.5)	18.8 (7.4)	16.3 (6.4)	138.7 (54.6)
Average precipitation days (≥ 0.2 mm)	7.4	7.8	8.8	9.8	11.1	14.5	12.9	10.4	8.3	7.8	8.0	7.2	114.0
Average rainy days (≥ 0.2 mm)	0.3	0.22	0.83	4.8	10.0	14.5	12.9	10.0	7.7	4.4	1.5	0.22	67.4
Average snowy days (≥ 0.2 cm)	7.8	7.9	9.3	7.0	2.4	0.08	0.0	0.13	0.96	4.6	7.1	7.7	55.0
Average relative humidity (%) (at 1500 LST)	55.7	54.7	50.2	42.7	43.8	49.2	46.8	44.3	44.3	45.3	54.2	56.3	49.0
Average dew point °C (°F)	−13.1 (8.4)	−12.0 (10.4)	−8.9 (16.0)	−4.5 (23.9)	0.8 (33.4)	6.1 (43.0)	9.1 (48.4)	7.8 (46.0)	3.0 (37.4)	−3.1 (26.4)	−8.3 (17.1)	−12.5 (9.5)	−3.0 (26.6)
Mean monthly sunshine hours	119.5	144.6	177.2	220.2	249.4	269.9	314.1	284.0	207.0	175.4	121.1	114.0	2,396.3
Percentage possible sunshine	45.6	51.3	48.2	53.1	51.8	54.6	63.1	62.9	54.4	52.7	45.0	46.0	52.4
Average ultraviolet index	1	1	2	4	6	7	7	6	4	2	1	0	3
Source: Environment and Climate Change Canada, weatherstats.ca (dew point, mean maxima/minima) and Weather Atlas (for UV index)

Climate data for Medicine Hat (composite station threads (Note: Data is from; Medicine Hat AWOS; Climate ID:3034483; coordinates 50°01′08.1″N 110°43′15″W; elevation: 716.9 m (2,352 ft); Medicine Hat; WMO ID: 71247; TC ID: YXH; coordinates 50°01′08″N 110°43′15″W; elevation: 716.9 m (2,352 ft); Medicine Hat A Climate ID: 3034480; TC ID: YXH; coordinates 50°01′08″N 110°43′15″W; elevation: 716.9 m (2,352 ft); Medicine Hat RCS; WMO ID: 71026; TC ID: XMW; coordinates 50°01′30.4″N 110°43′02.1″W; elevation: 715 m (2,346 ft))) 1991−2020 normals, extremes 1883−present, sun 1981–2010
Month	Jan	Feb	Mar	Apr	May	Jun	Jul	Aug	Sep	Oct	Nov	Dec	Year
Record high humidex	16.5	20.9	25.4	30.5	37.0	39.0	42.3	41.1	38.4	30.7	23.5	17.2	42.3
Record high °C (°F)	18.3 (64.9)	21.1 (70.0)	28.9 (84.0)	35.6 (96.1)	37.2 (99.0)	41.7 (107.1)	42.2 (108.0)	41.1 (106.0)	38.3 (100.9)	33.9 (93.0)	24.4 (75.9)	20.0 (68.0)	42.2 (108.0)
Mean daily maximum °C (°F)	−2.9 (26.8)	−0.6 (30.9)	5.9 (42.6)	13.5 (56.3)	19.2 (66.6)	23.1 (73.6)	27.7 (81.9)	27.2 (81.0)	21.3 (70.3)	13.2 (55.8)	4.6 (40.3)	−1.4 (29.5)	12.6 (54.7)
Daily mean °C (°F)	−8.5 (16.7)	−6.4 (20.5)	−0.3 (31.5)	6.6 (43.9)	12.1 (53.8)	16.4 (61.5)	20.1 (68.2)	19.4 (66.9)	13.8 (56.8)	6.6 (43.9)	−1.2 (29.8)	−6.9 (19.6)	6.0 (42.8)
Mean daily minimum °C (°F)	−14.1 (6.6)	−12.2 (10.0)	−6.6 (20.1)	−0.5 (31.1)	5.1 (41.2)	9.7 (49.5)	12.4 (54.3)	11.5 (52.7)	6.3 (43.3)	−0.2 (31.6)	−7.0 (19.4)	−12.4 (9.7)	−0.7 (30.7)
Record low °C (°F)	−46.1 (−51.0)	−46.1 (−51.0)	−38.9 (−38.0)	−26.7 (−16.1)	−11.1 (12.0)	−1.1 (30.0)	1.2 (34.2)	−0.6 (30.9)	−12.8 (9.0)	−28.7 (−19.7)	−37.8 (−36.0)	−45.6 (−50.1)	−46.1 (−51.0)
Record low wind chill	−54.2	−50.7	−44.7	−31	−12.6	−2.9	0.0	0.0	−12.8	−37.6	−49.2	−58.9	−58.9
Average precipitation mm (inches)	13.8 (0.54)	10.3 (0.41)	15.9 (0.63)	23.3 (0.92)	44.9 (1.77)	75.7 (2.98)	35.2 (1.39)	34.3 (1.35)	31.1 (1.22)	20.1 (0.79)	14.0 (0.55)	12.2 (0.48)	330.9 (13.03)
Average rainfall mm (inches)	0.7 (0.03)	0.5 (0.02)	4.4 (0.17)	16.1 (0.63)	33.2 (1.31)	82.7 (3.26)	32.6 (1.28)	34.6 (1.36)	31.3 (1.23)	15.0 (0.59)	2.8 (0.11)	0.7 (0.03)	254.4 (10.02)
Average snowfall cm (inches)	16.5 (6.5)	10.1 (4.0)	14.8 (5.8)	5.3 (2.1)	6.3 (2.5)	0.0 (0.0)	0.0 (0.0)	0.7 (0.3)	1.4 (0.6)	5.2 (2.0)	12.5 (4.9)	12.3 (4.8)	85.2 (33.5)
Average precipitation days (≥ 0.2 mm)	8.8	7.8	8.7	8.1	10.9	12.9	8.6	8.0	7.4	7.1	7.1	9.0	104.3
Average rainy days (≥ 0.2 mm)	0.75	0.53	1.8	6.1	9.5	11.7	7.7	6.9	7.2	4.8	1.9	0.8	59.7
Average snowy days (≥ 0.2 cm)	8.2	6.4	7.4	2.4	1.6	0.0	0.0	0.06	0.29	2.0	6.1	6.6	41.0
Average relative humidity (%) (at 1500)	6.1	60.5	49.8	37.6	38	41.9	34.8	33.4	37.6	44.3	57.4	65.4	47.2
Mean monthly sunshine hours	110.0	138.1	174.2	240.3	282.8	303.4	353.5	323.9	221.4	181.5	114.6	98.6	2,544.3
Percentage possible sunshine	41.2	48.6	47.4	58.3	59.3	62.5	71.7	72.3	58.3	54.3	42.0	38.9	54.6
Source: Environment and Climate Change Canada. Data is from Medicine Hat AWOS, Medicine Hat, Medicine Hat A, Medicine Hat RCS

=== Central Alberta ===
Central Alberta has a dry continental climate, with most places falling under the humid continental classification (Köppen climate classification Dfb), though some areas in the southeast of this region, close to the border with Saskatchewan around Oyen, are semi-arid (Köppen BSk). Precipitation levels here are generally higher than in Southern Alberta, though the driest areas of Alberta, around Empress, are in Central Alberta. This region generally has cooler temperatures than Southern Alberta in both summer and winter, due to the decreased amount of solar radiation received, and the lower frequency of chinooks blowing through the region. After Southern Ontario, Central Alberta is the region in Canada most likely to experience tornadoes. Most of Central Alberta is covered by aspen parkland, but the driest areas have mixedgrass and even dry mixed grass prairie, while the wetter and/or cooler areas are covered in mixed boreal forest. The wetter parts of this region, around Edmonton, have some of the most fertile land in the Canadian Prairies.

Climate data for Edmonton (Edmonton City Centre Airport). Climate ID: 3012208; coordinates 53°34′24″N 113°31′06″W; elevation: 670.6 m (2,200 ft); 1991–2020 normals, extremes 1880–present
Month	Jan	Feb	Mar	Apr	May	Jun	Jul	Aug	Sep	Oct	Nov	Dec	Year
Record high humidex	11.0	16.1	23.5	29.2	33.4	35.9	44.0	39.6	34.1	28.3	19.4	16.0	44.0
Record high °C (°F)	13.9 (57.0)	16.7 (62.1)	23.9 (75.0)	32.2 (90.0)	34.4 (93.9)	37.2 (99.0)	36.7 (98.1)	35.6 (96.1)	33.9 (93.0)	28.6 (83.5)	23.3 (73.9)	16.7 (62.1)	37.2 (99.0)
Mean maximum °C (°F)	7.8 (46.0)	8.7 (47.7)	13.0 (55.4)	22.2 (72.0)	27.7 (81.9)	28.5 (83.3)	30.6 (87.1)	30.5 (86.9)	27.4 (81.3)	21.5 (70.7)	11.6 (52.9)	7.1 (44.8)	32.2 (90.0)
Mean daily maximum °C (°F)	−5.8 (21.6)	−3.0 (26.6)	1.7 (35.1)	10.4 (50.7)	17.5 (63.5)	21.0 (69.8)	23.5 (74.3)	22.6 (72.7)	17.6 (63.7)	10.0 (50.0)	0.6 (33.1)	−4.7 (23.5)	9.3 (48.7)
Daily mean °C (°F)	−10.3 (13.5)	−7.9 (17.8)	−3.1 (26.4)	4.9 (40.8)	11.6 (52.9)	15.6 (60.1)	18.1 (64.6)	17.0 (62.6)	11.9 (53.4)	5.0 (41.0)	−3.5 (25.7)	−9.0 (15.8)	4.2 (39.6)
Mean daily minimum °C (°F)	−14.7 (5.5)	−12.7 (9.1)	−7.8 (18.0)	−0.7 (30.7)	5.6 (42.1)	10.2 (50.4)	12.6 (54.7)	11.3 (52.3)	6.2 (43.2)	−0.1 (31.8)	−7.5 (18.5)	−13.2 (8.2)	−0.9 (30.4)
Mean minimum °C (°F)	−29.2 (−20.6)	−24.7 (−12.5)	−21.7 (−7.1)	−9.7 (14.5)	−1.6 (29.1)	4.8 (40.6)	7.8 (46.0)	5.4 (41.7)	−0.7 (30.7)	−8.7 (16.3)	−19.0 (−2.2)	−24.9 (−12.8)	−31.9 (−25.4)
Record low °C (°F)	−49.4 (−56.9)	−49.4 (−56.9)	−40.0 (−40.0)	−26.1 (−15.0)	−12.2 (10.0)	−3.9 (25.0)	−1.7 (28.9)	−3.3 (26.1)	−11.7 (10.9)	−26.1 (−15.0)	−42.2 (−44.0)	−48.3 (−54.9)	−49.4 (−56.9)
Record low wind chill	−52.8	−50.7	−44.6	−37.5	−14.5	0.0	0.0	−3.7	−13.3	−34.3	−50.2	−55.5	−55.5
Average precipitation mm (inches)	19.6 (0.77)	11.8 (0.46)	16.8 (0.66)	28.6 (1.13)	44.2 (1.74)	69.9 (2.75)	82.7 (3.26)	60.7 (2.39)	38.5 (1.52)	20.5 (0.81)	17.5 (0.69)	11.8 (0.46)	422.5 (16.63)
Average rainfall mm (inches)	0.9 (0.04)	0.6 (0.02)	1.9 (0.07)	15.8 (0.62)	43.9 (1.73)	69.9 (2.75)	78.2 (3.08)	66.6 (2.62)	38.4 (1.51)	11.4 (0.45)	1.3 (0.05)	0.6 (0.02)	329.3 (12.96)
Average snowfall cm (inches)	25.6 (10.1)	12.7 (5.0)	19.1 (7.5)	15.0 (5.9)	4.9 (1.9)	0.0 (0.0)	0.0 (0.0)	0.1 (0.0)	0.7 (0.3)	11.0 (4.3)	19.8 (7.8)	15.1 (5.9)	123.9 (48.8)
Average precipitation days (≥ 0.2 mm)	11.2	8.0	8.1	8.9	10.2	14.4	15.1	12.2	10.6	8.7	8.8	8.3	124.4
Average rainy days (≥ 0.2 mm)	1.1	0.82	1.4	6.7	11.0	14.7	15.1	12.1	10.4	6.8	1.6	0.75	82.4
Average snowy days (≥ 0.2 cm)	10.6	6.9	7.5	4.1	1.1	0.0	0.0	0.06	0.29	2.9	7.2	8.4	49.0
Average relative humidity (%) (at 1500 LST)	65.2	59.5	53.9	43.5	39.3	47.8	50.6	49.3	48.2	51.0	63.8	65.4	53.1
Average dew point °C (°F)	−14.1 (6.6)	−12.5 (9.5)	−8.8 (16.2)	−3.6 (25.5)	1.4 (34.5)	7.7 (45.9)	11.1 (52.0)	10.1 (50.2)	5.0 (41.0)	−1.5 (29.3)	−7.6 (18.3)	−12.9 (8.8)	−2.1 (28.2)
Mean monthly sunshine hours	100.8	121.7	176.3	244.2	279.9	285.9	307.5	282.3	192.7	170.8	98.4	84.5	2,344.8
Mean daily sunshine hours	3.3	4.3	5.7	8.1	9.0	9.5	9.9	9.1	6.4	5.5	3.3	2.7	6.4
Percentage possible sunshine	40.2	44.1	48.1	58.2	56.8	56.2	60.2	61.5	50.4	52.0	37.8	36.0	50.1
Average ultraviolet index	0.0	1.0	2.0	4.0	5.0	6.0	6.0	5.0	4.0	2.0	1.0	0.0	3.0
Source 1: Environment and Climate Change Canada (sun, UV 1981–2010), (July record high humidex), Extremes (1880–1943); Note: climate data was collected near downtown Edmonton from July 1880 to June 1943, and at Edmonton City Centre Airport (Blatchford Field) from October 1937 to present.
Source 2: weatherstats.ca (for dewpoint and monthly&yearly average absolute maximum&minimum temperature)

Climate data for Oyen Cappon Climate ID: 3024961; coordinates 51°10′N 110°31′W; elevation: 792.5 m (2,600 ft); 1981−2010 normals
Month	Jan	Feb	Mar	Apr	May	Jun	Jul	Aug	Sep	Oct	Nov	Dec	Year
Record high °C (°F)	11.0 (51.8)	14.5 (58.1)	25.5 (77.9)	30.5 (86.9)	35.5 (95.9)	37.5 (99.5)	38.0 (100.4)	39.0 (102.2)	36.0 (96.8)	28.0 (82.4)	21.0 (69.8)	13.5 (56.3)	39.0 (102.2)
Mean daily maximum °C (°F)	−6.7 (19.9)	−4.0 (24.8)	2.2 (36.0)	12.2 (54.0)	18.2 (64.8)	22.1 (71.8)	26.1 (79.0)	25.6 (78.1)	18.8 (65.8)	10.1 (50.2)	0.7 (33.3)	−5.0 (23.0)	10.1 (50.2)
Daily mean °C (°F)	−11.4 (11.5)	−8.7 (16.3)	−2.9 (26.8)	5.5 (41.9)	11.3 (52.3)	15.5 (59.9)	18.8 (65.8)	18.0 (64.4)	12.0 (53.6)	5.1 (41.2)	−3.9 (25.0)	−9.6 (14.7)	4.1 (39.4)
Mean daily minimum °C (°F)	−16.1 (3.0)	−13.4 (7.9)	−8.0 (17.6)	−1.3 (29.7)	4.3 (39.7)	8.9 (48.0)	11.4 (52.5)	10.4 (50.7)	5.2 (41.4)	−1.0 (30.2)	−8.5 (16.7)	−14.3 (6.3)	−1.9 (28.6)
Record low °C (°F)	−40.0 (−40.0)	−40.5 (−40.9)	−33.5 (−28.3)	−23.3 (−9.9)	−7.5 (18.5)	−6.5 (20.3)	3.5 (38.3)	0.0 (32.0)	−8.5 (16.7)	−24.5 (−12.1)	−35.0 (−31.0)	−42.0 (−43.6)	−42.0 (−43.6)
Average precipitation mm (inches)	9.8 (0.39)	5.8 (0.23)	11.2 (0.44)	16.9 (0.67)	41.2 (1.62)	74.7 (2.94)	51.3 (2.02)	34.9 (1.37)	32.0 (1.26)	13.4 (0.53)	11.1 (0.44)	9.8 (0.39)	312.1 (12.29)
Average rainfall mm (inches)	0.0 (0.0)	0.2 (0.01)	1.1 (0.04)	12.3 (0.48)	40.0 (1.57)	74.7 (2.94)	51.3 (2.02)	34.9 (1.37)	31.0 (1.22)	7.7 (0.30)	0.5 (0.02)	0.4 (0.02)	254.1 (10.00)
Average snowfall cm (inches)	9.8 (3.9)	5.6 (2.2)	10.1 (4.0)	4.6 (1.8)	1.2 (0.5)	0.0 (0.0)	0.0 (0.0)	0.0 (0.0)	1.0 (0.4)	5.7 (2.2)	10.6 (4.2)	9.4 (3.7)	58 (23)
Average precipitation days (≥ 0.2 mm)	3.8	2.3	3.6	4.4	8.5	11.2	9.2	7.6	7.3	4.3	3.5	3.5	69.1
Average rainy days (≥ 0.2 mm)	0.0	0.07	0.52	3.2	8.2	11.2	9.2	7.6	7.0	2.9	0.19	0.12	50.2
Average snowy days (≥ 0.2 cm)	3.8	2.2	3.2	1.4	0.48	0.0	0.0	0.0	0.3	1.8	3.4	3.5	20.0
Source: Environment and Climate Change Canada,

=== Northern Alberta ===
Northern Alberta is the coldest region of Alberta, with most places having a subarctic climate (Köppen climate classification Dfc) though some areas in the south of this region, as well as much of the Peace River Country, have a humid continental climate (Köppen climate classification Dfb). Winters in Northern Alberta are long, and cold, while summers are short and warm. Precipitation levels are generally lower than Central Alberta and similar to Southern Alberta, but lower evapotranspiration results in there being greater effective precipitation than Southern Alberta. Natural vegetation in Northern Alberta consists primarily of mixed and coniferous taiga, with aspen parkland in the Peace River Country. With the exception of the Peace River Country, this region is generally quite poor for agriculture.

Climate data for Grande Prairie (Grande Prairie Airport) WMO ID: 71940; coordinates 55°10′47″N 118°53′06″W; elevation: 669 m (2,195 ft); 1991−2020 normals, extremes 1922−present
Month	Jan	Feb	Mar	Apr	May	Jun	Jul	Aug	Sep	Oct	Nov	Dec	Year
Record high humidex	14.5	11.1	15.6	28.6	30.8	44.0	40.8	36.6	34.7	27.1	17.2	12.1	44.0
Record high °C (°F)	15.2 (59.4)	12.8 (55.0)	16.1 (61.0)	29.4 (84.9)	34.4 (93.9)	41.1 (106.0)	35.6 (96.1)	34.5 (94.1)	31.9 (89.4)	28.9 (84.0)	22.2 (72.0)	13.3 (55.9)	41.1 (106.0)
Mean maximum °C (°F)	7.0 (44.6)	6.6 (43.9)	9.6 (49.3)	19.9 (67.8)	26.4 (79.5)	27.7 (81.9)	29.8 (85.6)	29.5 (85.1)	26.5 (79.7)	20.5 (68.9)	9.9 (49.8)	6.1 (43.0)	31.2 (88.2)
Mean daily maximum °C (°F)	−8.3 (17.1)	−4.6 (23.7)	−0.1 (31.8)	9.9 (49.8)	17.0 (62.6)	20.6 (69.1)	22.7 (72.9)	22.0 (71.6)	17.3 (63.1)	9.1 (48.4)	−0.9 (30.4)	−6.4 (20.5)	8.2 (46.8)
Daily mean °C (°F)	−13.9 (7.0)	−10.5 (13.1)	−5.8 (21.6)	3.8 (38.8)	10.3 (50.5)	14.3 (57.7)	16.3 (61.3)	15.2 (59.4)	10.5 (50.9)	3.3 (37.9)	−5.9 (21.4)	−11.7 (10.9)	2.2 (35.9)
Mean daily minimum °C (°F)	−19.4 (−2.9)	−16.3 (2.7)	−11.5 (11.3)	−2.3 (27.9)	3.4 (38.1)	8.0 (46.4)	9.9 (49.8)	8.4 (47.1)	3.8 (38.8)	−2.4 (27.7)	−10.7 (12.7)	−17.0 (1.4)	−3.8 (25.1)
Mean minimum °C (°F)	−36.5 (−33.7)	−30.9 (−23.6)	−27.9 (−18.2)	−12.5 (9.5)	−3.8 (25.2)	2.3 (36.1)	4.6 (40.3)	2.0 (35.6)	−3.9 (25.0)	−12.2 (10.0)	−24.7 (−12.5)	−31.3 (−24.3)	−40.2 (−40.4)
Record low °C (°F)	−52.2 (−62.0)	−50.0 (−58.0)	−42.8 (−45.0)	−35.6 (−32.1)	−8.7 (16.3)	−3.3 (26.1)	−1.1 (30.0)	−2.8 (27.0)	−11.7 (10.9)	−31.7 (−25.1)	−40.6 (−41.1)	−47.2 (−53.0)	−52.2 (−62.0)
Record low wind chill	−63.0	−55.0	−53.1	−46.7	−16.1	−4.3	0.0	−3.2	−15.3	−34.3	−56.1	−56.3	−63.0
Average precipitation mm (inches)	28.4 (1.12)	15.5 (0.61)	17.6 (0.69)	21.7 (0.85)	41.6 (1.64)	72.4 (2.85)	72.9 (2.87)	49.9 (1.96)	37.2 (1.46)	30.2 (1.19)	28.6 (1.13)	19.1 (0.75)	435.3 (17.14)
Average rainfall mm (inches)	2.4 (0.09)	0.8 (0.03)	1.7 (0.07)	12.2 (0.48)	37.8 (1.49)	71.6 (2.82)	73.1 (2.88)	49.9 (1.96)	35.7 (1.41)	17.8 (0.70)	7.1 (0.28)	0.8 (0.03)	310.8 (12.24)
Average snowfall cm (inches)	34.3 (13.5)	20.4 (8.0)	21.6 (8.5)	11.2 (4.4)	5.0 (2.0)	0.2 (0.1)	0.0 (0.0)	0.0 (0.0)	1.6 (0.6)	14.8 (5.8)	27.8 (10.9)	25.3 (10.0)	162.2 (63.9)
Average precipitation days (≥ 0.2 mm)	12.6	7.7	9.3	8.2	10.8	13.5	14.0	11.2	11.5	11.0	11.8	9.8	131.4
Average rainy days (≥ 0.2 mm)	2.2	0.8	1.9	5.5	10.3	13.4	14.2	11.2	11.4	7.7	3.9	1.0	83.5
Average snowy days (≥ 0.2 cm)	11.5	7.6	8.0	3.7	1.3	0.04	0.0	0.0	0.56	4.3	9.2	9.6	55.8
Average relative humidity (%) (at 1500 LST)	72.9	68.8	61.7	45.9	39.6	45.9	48.8	48.0	49.7	56.5	73.0	74.3	57.1
Average dew point °C (°F)	−16.6 (2.1)	−14.2 (6.4)	−10.3 (13.5)	−3.9 (25.0)	0.8 (33.4)	6.4 (43.5)	9.4 (48.9)	8.5 (47.3)	4.2 (39.6)	−1.8 (28.8)	−9.2 (15.4)	−15.0 (5.0)	−3.5 (25.7)
Mean monthly sunshine hours	77.8	106.2	172.1	231.0	276.0	295.2	307.7	272.4	172.5	134.5	78.9	73.5	2,197.7
Percentage possible sunshine	32.1	39.1	47.0	54.6	55.1	56.9	59.1	58.7	45.0	41.3	31.2	32.7	46.1
Source: Environment and Climate Change Canada (1991–2020) (sun 1981–2010) (June max) (mean maximum / minimum, & dew point from weatherstats.ca)

Climate data for High Level (High Level Airport) Climate ID: 3073146; coordinates 58°37′17″N 117°09′53″W; elevation: 338 m (1,109 ft); 1991−2020 normals, extremes 1970−present (Note: Climate data 1991–2020 is a composite recorded at High Level A (WMO ID: 71066; climate ID: 3073140; coordinates 58°37′18″N 117°09′53″W; elevation: 338 m (1,109 ft)) and High Level A (climate ID: 3073146; coordinates 58°37′17″N 117°09′53″W; elevation: 338 m (1,109 ft)))
Month	Jan	Feb	Mar	Apr	May	Jun	Jul	Aug	Sep	Oct	Nov	Dec	Year
Record high humidex	11.4	14.2	18.3	29.8	33.8	35.5	39.8	37.7	32.2	26.2	13.4	13.7	39.8
Record high °C (°F)	11.3 (52.3)	14.6 (58.3)	18.5 (65.3)	30.2 (86.4)	33.9 (93.0)	33.5 (92.3)	36.0 (96.8)	35.2 (95.4)	30.2 (86.4)	26.1 (79.0)	15.0 (59.0)	14.2 (57.6)	36.0 (96.8)
Mean maximum °C (°F)	2.5 (36.5)	4.9 (40.8)	10.1 (50.2)	19.7 (67.5)	26.5 (79.7)	28.7 (83.7)	30.3 (86.5)	29.1 (84.4)	24.0 (75.2)	16.9 (62.4)	5.4 (41.7)	1.9 (35.4)	31.1 (88.0)
Mean daily maximum °C (°F)	−14.6 (5.7)	−10.2 (13.6)	−2.6 (27.3)	8.4 (47.1)	16.8 (62.2)	21.5 (70.7)	23.3 (73.9)	21.5 (70.7)	15.4 (59.7)	5.8 (42.4)	−6.5 (20.3)	−13.1 (8.4)	5.5 (41.8)
Daily mean °C (°F)	−19.8 (−3.6)	−16.3 (2.7)	−9.4 (15.1)	1.7 (35.1)	9.5 (49.1)	14.7 (58.5)	16.8 (62.2)	14.8 (58.6)	9.0 (48.2)	0.9 (33.6)	−11.1 (12.0)	−18.1 (−0.6)	−0.6 (30.9)
Mean daily minimum °C (°F)	−25.0 (−13.0)	−22.5 (−8.5)	−16.2 (2.8)	−4.9 (23.2)	2.1 (35.8)	7.8 (46.0)	10.3 (50.5)	8.1 (46.6)	2.6 (36.7)	−4.0 (24.8)	−15.5 (4.1)	−23.1 (−9.6)	−6.7 (20.0)
Mean minimum °C (°F)	−40.0 (−40.0)	−35.8 (−32.4)	−33.4 (−28.1)	−16.8 (1.8)	−5.5 (22.1)	0.7 (33.3)	4.0 (39.2)	0.7 (33.3)	−5.3 (22.5)	−14.0 (6.8)	−30.0 (−22.0)	−36.2 (−33.2)	−42.1 (−43.8)
Record low °C (°F)	−50.6 (−59.1)	−46.1 (−51.0)	−45.0 (−49.0)	−32.2 (−26.0)	−13.7 (7.3)	−3.6 (25.5)	−0.2 (31.6)	−4.4 (24.1)	−13.9 (7.0)	−36.3 (−33.3)	−43.4 (−46.1)	−47.2 (−53.0)	−50.6 (−59.1)
Record low wind chill	−57.1	−51.1	−50.3	−35.8	−22.1	−3.8	0.0	−6.1	−17.5	−32.9	−53.0	−54.5	−57.1
Average precipitation mm (inches)	19.7 (0.78)	15.7 (0.62)	17.3 (0.68)	14.8 (0.58)	28.9 (1.14)	54.6 (2.15)	72.9 (2.87)	41.9 (1.65)	34.5 (1.36)	19.1 (0.75)	21.0 (0.83)	19.6 (0.77)	360.0 (14.17)
Average rainfall mm (inches)	1.1 (0.04)	0.4 (0.02)	1.1 (0.04)	6.4 (0.25)	26.4 (1.04)	56.0 (2.20)	72.9 (2.87)	41.9 (1.65)	32.1 (1.26)	10.4 (0.41)	1.1 (0.04)	0.8 (0.03)	250.5 (9.86)
Average snowfall cm (inches)	26.9 (10.6)	20.9 (8.2)	23.0 (9.1)	10.9 (4.3)	2.9 (1.1)	0.0 (0.0)	0.0 (0.0)	0.0 (0.0)	2.2 (0.9)	10.8 (4.3)	27.6 (10.9)	28.5 (11.2)	153.7 (60.5)
Average precipitation days (≥ 0.2 mm)	12.5	9.0	7.8	5.3	8.5	11.8	13.0	12.0	9.8	9.1	11.2	11.8	121.7
Average rainy days (≥ 0.2 mm)	0.72	0.29	0.54	2.5	7.9	11.8	13.0	12.0	9.6	5.3	1.1	0.62	65.3
Average snowy days (≥ 0.2 cm)	12.8	9.6	7.9	3.5	1.2	0.04	0.0	0.0	0.56	5.0	11.7	12.5	64.7
Average relative humidity (%) (at 1500 LST)	71.1	64.5	53.1	41.6	37.9	45.8	51.5	52.4	53.2	62.8	78.9	76.5	57.4
Average dew point °C (°F)	−23.3 (−9.9)	−20.1 (−4.2)	−15.0 (5.0)	−6.8 (19.8)	−0.1 (31.8)	7.3 (45.1)	10.7 (51.3)	9.3 (48.7)	3.7 (38.7)	−3.3 (26.1)	−13.3 (8.1)	−20.8 (−5.4)	−6.0 (21.2)
Mean monthly sunshine hours	52.6	96.2	178.5	239.4	280.1	298.2	295.2	264.4	168.0	101.3	46.0	35.3	2,055.1
Percentage possible sunshine	23.8	36.8	48.9	55.4	53.7	54.5	54.1	55.3	43.5	31.7	19.5	17.7	41.2
Source 1: Environment and Climate Change Canada (sun 1981–2010)
Source 2: weatherstats.ca (for dewpoint and monthly/yearly average absolute maximum/minimum temperature)

=== Rocky Mountains and Cypress Hills ===
Lower elevations of the Rocky Mountains and all but the highest elevations of the Cypress Hills have a humid continental climate (Köppen climate classification Dfb). These areas have snowy but mild winters due to the warming effect of chinook winds, and cool summers due to their high elevation. As altitude increases and the subalpine zone is reached, this grades into a subarctic climate (Köppen climate classification Dfc), with harsher winters and even cooler summers. Above the tree line, an alpine climate (Köppen climate classification ETH) prevails. Conditions this high are even colder and very windy. Precipitation is higher in these elevated regions than elsewhere in Alberta, and this supports forests of lodgepole pine and trembling aspen mixed with fescue grasslands in the montane areas, Engelmann spruce and subalpine fir forests in the subalpine zone, and heather, sedges and mountain avens in the alpine zone above the tree lines.

Climate data for Lake Louise Climate ID: 3034480; coordinates 51°26′N 116°13′W; elevation: 1,524 m (5,000 ft); 1981−2010 normals
Month	Jan	Feb	Mar	Apr	May	Jun	Jul	Aug	Sep	Oct	Nov	Dec	Year
Record high °C (°F)	7.8 (46.0)	13.9 (57.0)	17.0 (62.6)	26.5 (79.7)	31.7 (89.1)	31.1 (88.0)	34.4 (93.9)	32.2 (90.0)	29.0 (84.2)	26.1 (79.0)	18.3 (64.9)	12.2 (54.0)	34.4 (93.9)
Mean daily maximum °C (°F)	−5.4 (22.3)	−1.7 (28.9)	2.9 (37.2)	7.5 (45.5)	12.7 (54.9)	16.7 (62.1)	20.4 (68.7)	20.1 (68.2)	14.7 (58.5)	7.3 (45.1)	−1.7 (28.9)	−6.9 (19.6)	7.2 (45.0)
Daily mean °C (°F)	−12.0 (10.4)	−9.7 (14.5)	−4.7 (23.5)	0.9 (33.6)	5.8 (42.4)	9.7 (49.5)	12.6 (54.7)	11.9 (53.4)	7.1 (44.8)	1.1 (34.0)	−7.1 (19.2)	−13.0 (8.6)	0.2 (32.4)
Mean daily minimum °C (°F)	−18.4 (−1.1)	−17.6 (0.3)	−12.3 (9.9)	−5.8 (21.6)	−1.2 (29.8)	2.8 (37.0)	4.7 (40.5)	3.6 (38.5)	−0.5 (31.1)	−5.1 (22.8)	−12.6 (9.3)	−19.1 (−2.4)	−6.8 (19.8)
Record low °C (°F)	−52.8 (−63.0)	−50.6 (−59.1)	−44.4 (−47.9)	−33.9 (−29.0)	−27.8 (−18.0)	−10.0 (14.0)	−7.0 (19.4)	−7.5 (18.5)	−25.0 (−13.0)	−32.0 (−25.6)	−44.0 (−47.2)	−49.4 (−56.9)	−52.8 (−63.0)
Average precipitation mm (inches)	52.4 (2.06)	47.9 (1.89)	37.3 (1.47)	32.3 (1.27)	59.9 (2.36)	54.3 (2.14)	56.4 (2.22)	53.9 (2.12)	41.9 (1.65)	37.7 (1.48)	57.4 (2.26)	48.7 (1.92)	543.8 (21.41)
Average rainfall mm (inches)	0.7 (0.03)	0.0 (0.0)	1.5 (0.06)	9.0 (0.35)	32.8 (1.29)	54.1 (2.13)	56.4 (2.22)	53.6 (2.11)	39.1 (1.54)	19.0 (0.75)	2.4 (0.09)	0.0 (0.0)	268.7 (10.58)
Average snowfall cm (inches)	51.3 (20.2)	33.4 (13.1)	36.4 (14.3)	23.5 (9.3)	7.1 (2.8)	0.2 (0.1)	0.0 (0.0)	0.0 (0.0)	2.8 (1.1)	18.7 (7.4)	57.0 (22.4)	48.8 (19.2)	279.1 (109.9)
Average precipitation days (≥ 0.2 mm)	12.0	8.1	9.9	8.2	13.3	16.5	14.9	14.2	11.6	11.3	12.5	11.5	143.9
Average rainy days (≥ 0.2 mm)	0.1	0.0	0.38	2.6	11.9	16.5	14.9	14.2	11.2	6.1	0.5	0.0	78.3
Average snowy days (≥ 0.2 cm)	11.9	8.1	9.8	6.0	2.2	0.1	0.0	0.0	0.93	6.0	12.1	11.5	68.5
Source: Environment and Climate Change Canada

Climate data for Cypress Hills Climate ID: 4021996; coordinates 49°40′N 109°28′W; elevation: 1,196 m (3,924 ft); 1981−2010 normals
Month	Jan	Feb	Mar	Apr	May	Jun	Jul	Aug	Sep	Oct	Nov	Dec	Year
Record high °C (°F)	19.0 (66.2)	18.0 (64.4)	19.0 (66.2)	26.0 (78.8)	40.5 (104.9)	34.0 (93.2)	34.5 (94.1)	34.5 (94.1)	32.0 (89.6)	28.0 (82.4)	21.0 (69.8)	15.0 (59.0)	40.5 (104.9)
Mean daily maximum °C (°F)	−3.0 (26.6)	−1.4 (29.5)	2.4 (36.3)	9.8 (49.6)	15.2 (59.4)	19.1 (66.4)	23.2 (73.8)	22.8 (73.0)	16.6 (61.9)	10.1 (50.2)	1.7 (35.1)	−2.3 (27.9)	9.5 (49.1)
Daily mean °C (°F)	−9 (16)	−7.2 (19.0)	−2.9 (26.8)	3.5 (38.3)	8.7 (47.7)	12.7 (54.9)	15.9 (60.6)	15.3 (59.5)	9.6 (49.3)	4.0 (39.2)	−3.5 (25.7)	−8.0 (17.6)	3.3 (37.9)
Mean daily minimum °C (°F)	−15.0 (5.0)	−13.0 (8.6)	−8.2 (17.2)	−2.9 (26.8)	2.1 (35.8)	6.3 (43.3)	8.6 (47.5)	7.6 (45.7)	2.7 (36.9)	−2.2 (28.0)	−8.6 (16.5)	−13.7 (7.3)	−3.0 (26.6)
Record low °C (°F)	−42.5 (−44.5)	−40.0 (−40.0)	−35.5 (−31.9)	−26.5 (−15.7)	−11.5 (11.3)	−3.5 (25.7)	0.0 (32.0)	−4.0 (24.8)	−10.0 (14.0)	−28.5 (−19.3)	−39.0 (−38.2)	−41.5 (−42.7)	−42.5 (−44.5)
Average precipitation mm (inches)	33.3 (1.31)	31.0 (1.22)	43.3 (1.70)	41.4 (1.63)	74.0 (2.91)	103.3 (4.07)	59.7 (2.35)	47.8 (1.88)	58.9 (2.32)	36.8 (1.45)	32.8 (1.29)	38.3 (1.51)	600.6 (23.64)
Average rainfall mm (inches)	0.0 (0.0)	0.1 (0.00)	1.9 (0.07)	15.9 (0.63)	51.1 (2.01)	103 (4.1)	59.7 (2.35)	46.8 (1.84)	51.1 (2.01)	13.6 (0.54)	1.9 (0.07)	0.2 (0.01)	345.4 (13.60)
Average snowfall cm (inches)	33.3 (13.1)	31.0 (12.2)	41.3 (16.3)	25.5 (10.0)	22.8 (9.0)	0.3 (0.1)	0.0 (0.0)	0.9 (0.4)	7.7 (3.0)	23.2 (9.1)	30.9 (12.2)	38.1 (15.0)	255.2 (100.5)
Average precipitation days (≥ 0.2 mm)	9.7	9.6	10.5	9.8	11.5	14.3	10.4	9.8	9.7	8.4	9.5	11	124.3
Average rainy days (≥ 0.2 mm)	0.0	0.1	0.81	4.2	9.5	14.3	10.4	9.7	8.8	4.3	1.1	0.2	63.5
Average snowy days (≥ 0.2 cm)	9.7	9.1	10	6.4	2.8	0.1	0.0	0.1	1.7	4.6	8.9	10.9	64.1
Source: Environment and Climate Change Canada

== Ecology ==
=== Lists of ecological regions and zones ===
According to the provincial government's Natural Regions Committee, the following natural regions and subregions are found in Alberta:

- Rocky Mountains
  - Alpine
  - Subalpine
  - Montane
- Foothills
  - Upper Foothills
  - Lower Foothills
- Grassland
  - Dry Mixedgrass
  - Mixedgrass
  - Northern Fescue
  - Foothills Fescue
- Parkland
  - Foothills Parkland
  - Central Parkland
  - Peace River Parkland
- Boreal Forest
  - Dry Mixedwood
  - Central Mixedwood
  - Lower Boreal Highlands
  - Upper Boreal Highlands
  - Athabasca Plain
  - Peace–Athabasca Delta
  - Northern Mixedwood
  - Boreal Subarctic
- Canadian Shield
  - Kazan Upland

According to the Commission for Environmental Cooperation and Environment and Climate Change Canada, the following Canadian ecozones are found in Alberta:

- Boreal Plains Ecozone (CEC)
- Boreal Shield Ecozone (CEC)
- Montane Cordillera Ecozone (CEC)
- Prairies Ecozone
- Taiga Plains Ecozone (CEC)
- Taiga Shield Ecozone (CEC)

According to the World Wide Fund for Nature, the following Canadian ecoregions are found in Alberta:

- Alberta Mountain forests
- Alberta–British Columbia foothills forests
- Canadian aspen forests and parklands
- North Central Rockies forests
- Northern mixed grasslands
- Northern short grasslands
- Mid-Continental Canadian forests
- Montana valley and foothill grasslands
- Muskwa–Slave Lake forests

== See also ==
- Geography of Canada
- Glacial Lake Bassano
