= Northern Cordillera forests =

Taiga ecoregion of northwestern Canada

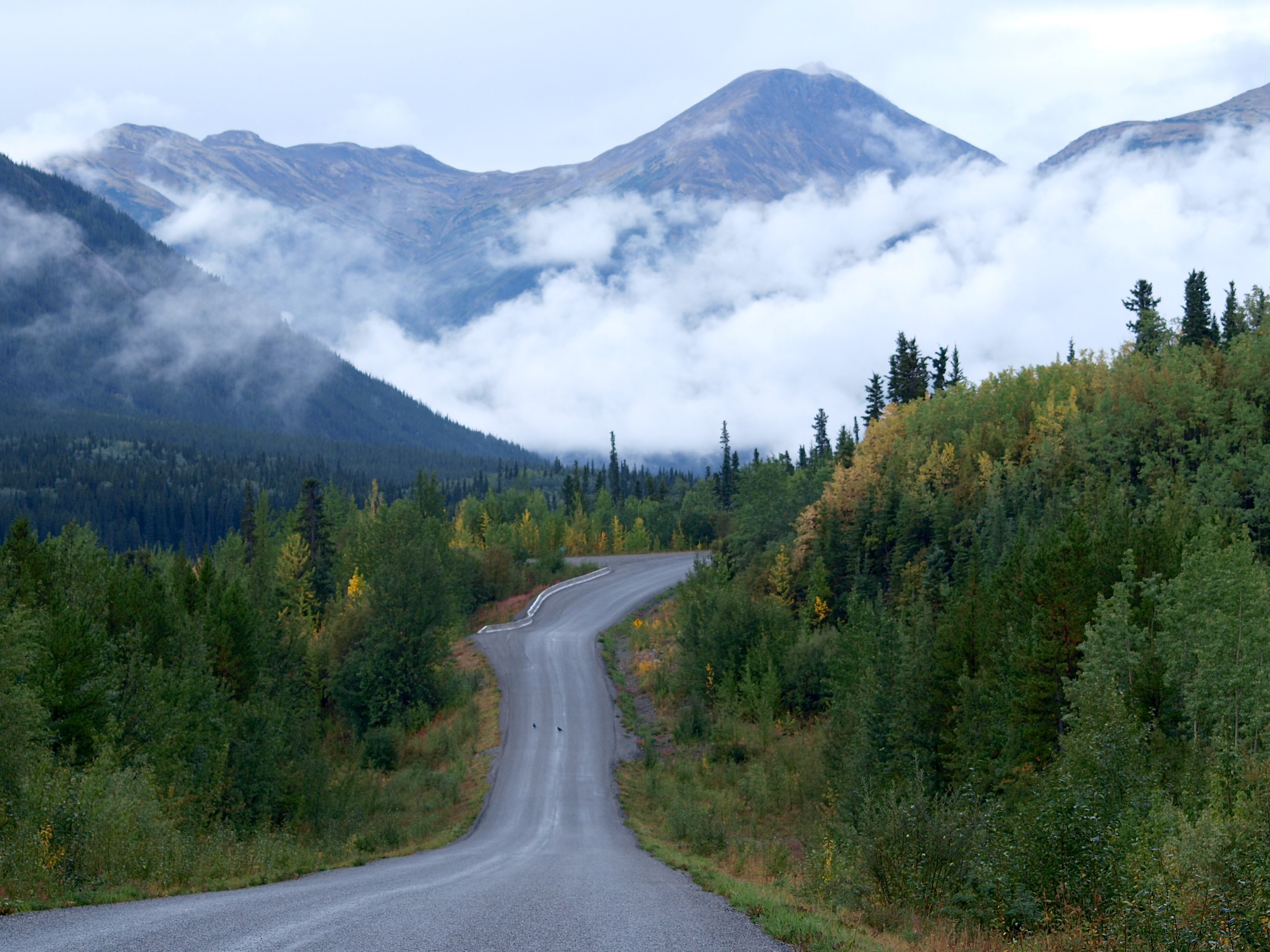
- Coniferous forest and deciduous shrubs along the Stewart–Cassiar Highway near Good Hope Lake

Ecology
- Realm: Nearctic
- Biome: Boreal forests/taiga
- Borders: List: Alaska-St. Elias Range tundra; Alberta-British Columbia foothills forests; Central British Columbia Mountain forests; Interior Yukon-Alaska alpine tundra; Muskwa-Slave Lake forests; Northern transitional alpine forests; Northwest Territories taiga; Ogilvie-MacKenzie alpine tundra; Pacific Coastal Mountain icefields and tundra; Yukon Interior dry forests
- Bird species: 165
- Mammal species: 55

Geography
- Area: 262,884 km^{2} (101,500 sq mi)
- Country: Canada
- Provinces/territories: British Columbia, Northwest Territories, and Yukon
- Climate type: Subarctic

Conservation
- Conservation status: Vulnerable
- Habitat loss: 0%
- Protected: 11.6%

Northern Cordillera forests is a taiga ecoregion that extends across the northern interior of British Columbia, southern Yukon, and a small area of the Northwest Territories as defined by the World Wildlife Fund (WWF) categorization system.

== Setting ==
This ecoregion occupies a transitional region of mountains, valleys, and high plateaus between the Coast and Saint Elias Mountains to the west, and the Northern Rocky Mountains to the east.

== Climate ==
This ecoregion has a predominantly subarctic climate (Köppen Dfc ) with cool summers and cold winters. Mean annual precipitation is approximately 350-600 mm, but increases up to 1000 mm at higher elevations. The highest elevations feature an alpine tundra climate.

== Ecology ==
=== Flora ===
The lower mountains and valleys are dominated by alpine fir, lodgepole pine, and black and white spruce all intermixed with a variety of deciduous shrubs. Higher elevations are dominated by dwarf birch, willow, and a variety of dwarf ericaceous shrubs. The highest elevations are dominated by grass, lichen, and moss.

=== Fauna ===
Fauna found throughout this ecoregion include grizzly bear, black bear, moose, mountain goat, beaver, red fox, wolves, ptarmigan, and snowy owl.

== Conservation ==
Some protected areas of this ecoregion include:

- Denetiah Provincial Park and Protected Area
- Kusawa Territorial Park
- Nahanni National Park Reserve
- Neʼāhʼ Conservancy
- Spatsizi Plateau Wilderness Provincial Park
- Tā Chʼilā Provincial Park

== See also ==
- List of ecoregions in Canada (WWF)
