= Central British Columbia Mountain forests =

Temperate coniferous forest ecoregion in British Columbia, Canada

Central British Columbia Mountain Forests
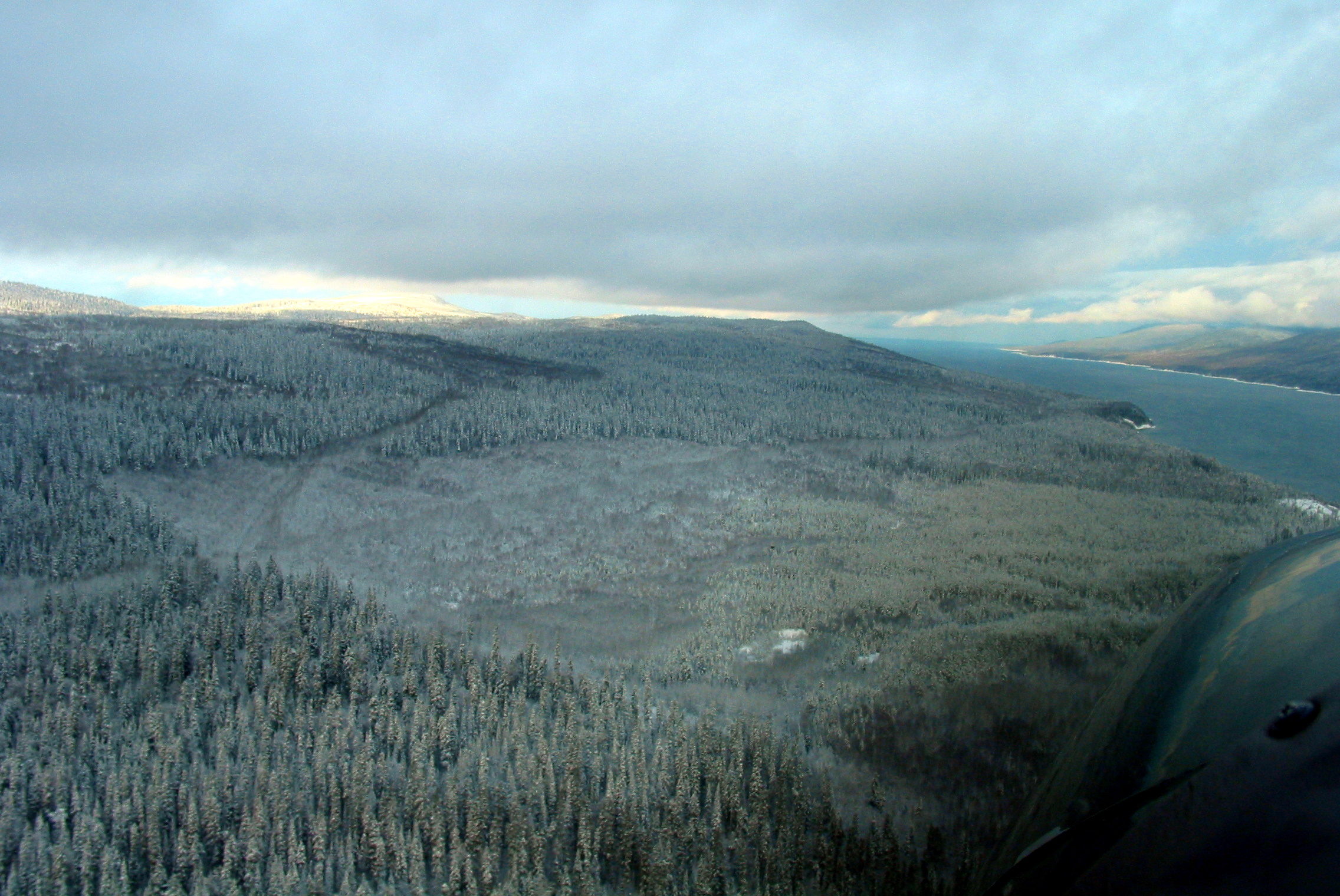
- Forest along the southwestern shores Williston Lake

Ecology
- Realm: Nearctic
- Biome: Temperate coniferous forests
- Borders: List: Alberta Mountain forests; Alberta-British Columbia foothills forests; Canadian aspen forests and parklands; Fraser Plateau and Basin complex; North Central Rockies forests; Northern Cordillera forests; Northern transitional alpine forests
- Bird species: 174
- Mammal species: 59

Geography
- Area: 71,743 km^{2} (27,700 mi^{2})
- Country: Canada
- Provinces: British Columbia

Conservation
- Conservation status: Vulnerable
- Habitat loss: 0%
- Protected: 5.51%

The Central British Columbia Mountain forests is a temperate coniferous forest ecoregion in north-central British Columbia, as defined by the World Wildlife Fund (WWF) categorization system.

== Setting ==
The WWF defines the ecoregion as inhabiting parts of the Stikine Ranges, Skeena Mountains, Omineca Mountains, Muskwa Ranges, and Hart Ranges. The forest is also found along the shores of Williston Lake and Takla Lake, among countless others scattered about the region. Elevations range from 700-2400 metres (2,297-7,874 ft).

== Climate ==
This ecoregion has a predominantly subarctic climate (Köppen Dfc) with cool to mild summers and cool to cold winters. The mean annual temperature is just 2°C (35.6°F), the mean summer temperature is 12°C (53.6°F), and the mean winter temperature is -8.5°C (16.7°F). Annual precipitation averages between 500-700 mm (19.7-27.6 in) and is drier in the northwest than in the southeast.

== Ecology ==
=== Flora ===
The flora present in this ecoregion varies greatly depending on elevation. Low elevations host forests dominated by western red cedar and western hemlock in the northwest, and forests of lodgepole pine, quaking aspen, and black and white spruce in the southeast. Mid to high elevations throughout the ecoregion host forests of alpine fir, lodgepole pine, and Engelmann and white spruce. The highest elevations, which are found in the far northwest and southeast extremes of the ecoregion, host communities of low-lying arctic lupine, glacier lily, mountain heather, and mountain avens.

=== Fauna ===
Mammals found throughout this ecoregion include woodland caribou, elk, moose, black-tailed deer, beaver, wolverine, marten, red fox, wolf, and large populations of black bear and grizzly bear. Bighorn sheep and mountain goat can be found at higher elevations.

Birds that take residence in this ecoregion include goose, grouse, loon, ptarmigan, and a variety of owl species.

== Protected areas ==
Some protected areas of this ecoregion include:

- Gwillim Lake Provincial Park
- Kakwa Provincial Park and Protected Area
- Monkman Provincial Park
- Pine Le Moray Provincial Park
- Sustut Provincial Park and Protected Area
- Tatlatui Provincial Park

== See also ==
- List of ecoregions in Canada (WWF)
