= Neʼāhʼ Conservancy =

Conservancy in British Columbia, Canada

- IUCN category II (national park)
- Location within British Columbia
- Location: Stikine Region, British Columbia, Canada
- Nearest city: Watson Lake, Yukon
- Coordinates: 59°18′59″N 128°42′08″W
- Area: 233,304 ha (900.79 sq mi)
- Established: 31 March 2013
- Governing body: BC Parks

Neʼāhʼ Conservancy is a conservancy located in the Stikine Region of British Columbia, Canada. The conservancy was established on 31 March 2013 through a cooperative resource management and land use planning agreement between BC Parks and the Kaska Dena First Nations.

== Geography ==
Ne’āh’ Conservancy is located between Cassiar Mountains and the Liard Plains in northern British Columbia. The conservancy borders BC Highway 37 and the much smaller Tā Ch’ilā Provincial Park to the west. Covering an area of 233,304 hectares (576,510 acres), it is the second largest conservancy after Kitlope Heritage Conservancy.

== Ecology ==
The conservancy protects high value habitat for a variety of mammal species such as black bear, boreal woodland caribou, moose, mountain goat, and stone sheep.
