= Northern transitional alpine forests =

Temperate coniferous forest ecoregion in British Columbia, Canada

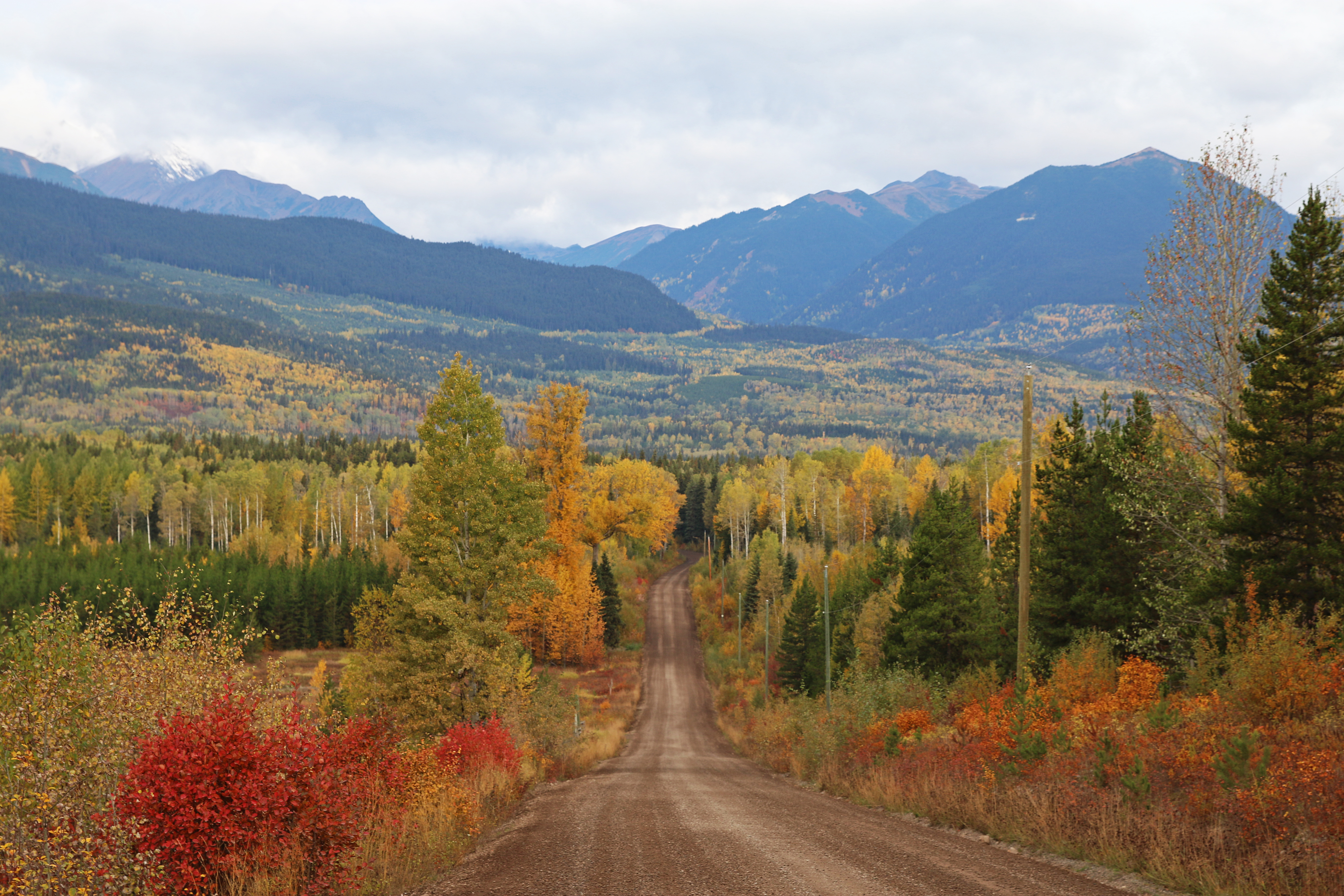
- Transitional alpine forest just south of Witset

Ecology
- Realm: Nearctic
- Biome: temperate coniferous forests
- Borders: List: British Columbia mainland coastal forests; Central British Columbia Mountain forests; Fraser Plateau and Basin complex; Northern Cordillera forests; Pacific Coastal Mountain icefields and tundra
- Bird species: 144
- Mammal species: 51

Geography
- Area: 25,641 km^{2} (9,900 mi^{2})
- Country: Canada
- Provinces: British Columbia

Conservation
- Conservation status: Vulnerable
- Habitat loss: 0%
- Protected: 1.57%

Northern transitional alpine forests are a temperate coniferous forest ecoregion in the northwestern interior of British Columbia, as defined by the World Wildlife Fund (WWF) categorization system.

== Setting ==
This ecoregion occupies a transitional region of mountains and valleys between the Coast Ranges to the west and the Omineca Mountains to the east. It varies greatly in elevation from the heavily glacierized areas of the Hazelton and Skeena mountains between 2,500–2,800 m (8,200–9,200 ft), to the Nass and Skeena river valleys below 750 m (2,460 ft).

== Climate ==
This ecoregion varies greatly depending on its proximity to the Pacific coast. In the west it has a warm humid continental climate (Köppen Dsb ) with warm summers and cold winters. In the east, it has a subarctic climate (Köppen Dfc ) with cool summers and cold winters. Precipitation ranges from 2500mm (98.4 in) in the western coastal areas of the Nass River valley, to 600mm (23.6 in) in the lower elevations of the interior Bulkley Ranges. Temperature varies greatly with elevation, but averages around 13°C (55.4°F) in the summer and -9.5°C (14.9°F) in the winter.

== Ecology ==
=== Flora ===
The lower mountains and valleys are dominated by western red cedar, western hemlock, and mountain hemlock. Higher elevations are dominated by lodgepole pine, engelmann spruce, and alpine fir, though to a lesser extent in the west of the ecoregion. Vegetation in the alpine tundra includes discontinuous patches of low growing heather, sedge, and mountain avens.

=== Fauna ===
Fauna found throughout this ecoregion include grizzly bear, American black bear, moose, mountain goat, red fox, and wolves. Parts are also populated by woodland caribou, black-tailed deer, beaver, wolverine, marten, snowshoe hare, ptarmigan, and grouse.

== See also ==
- List of ecoregions in Canada (WWF)
- Babine Mountains Provincial Park
