= Alberta–British Columbia foothills forests =

Temperate coniferous forests ecoregion of Alberta and British Columbia, Canada

Coordinates: 55.0000°N 120.0000°W

Alberta–British Columbia foothill forests
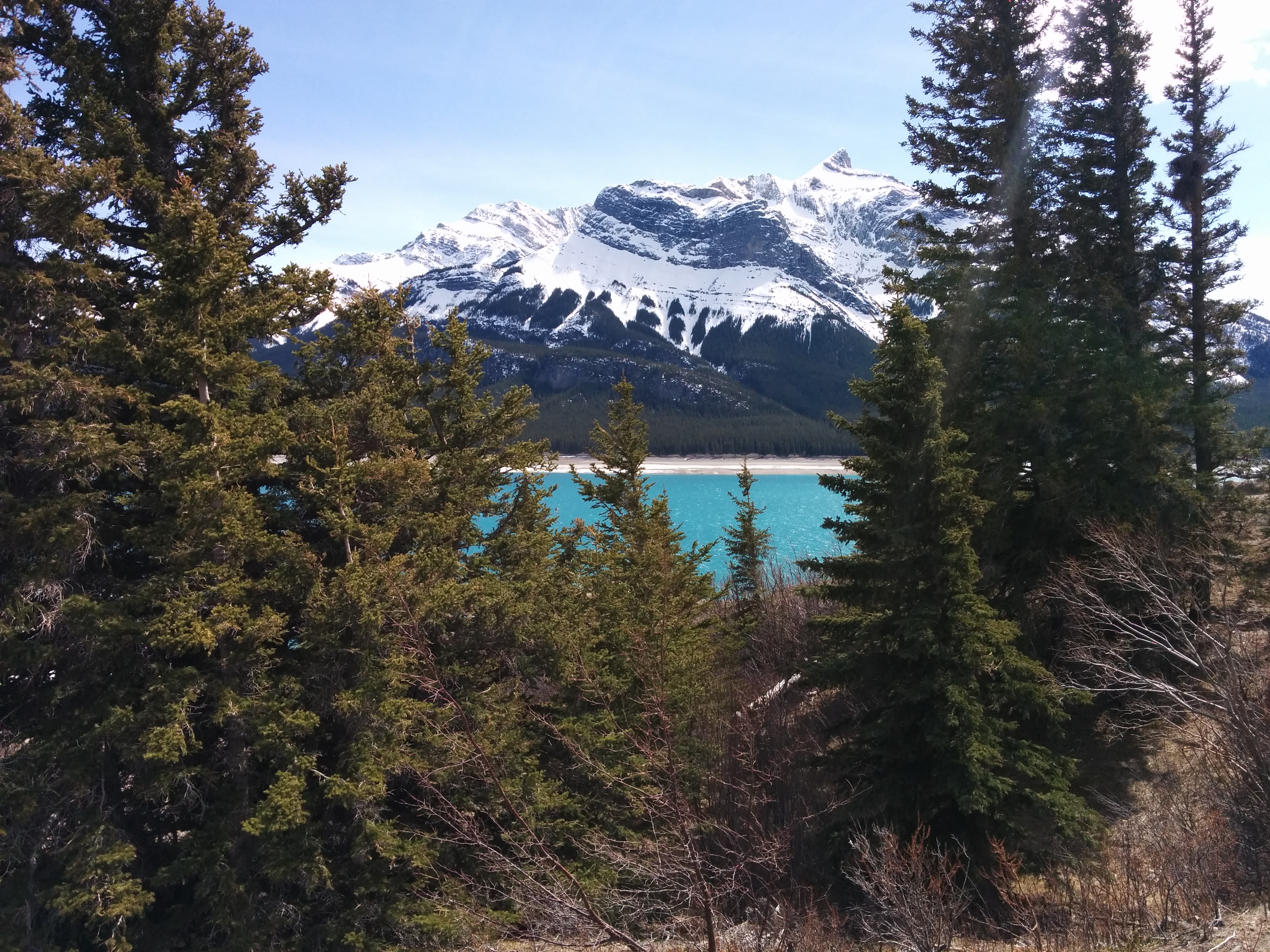
- Forests of Crimson Lake Provincial Park, Alberta

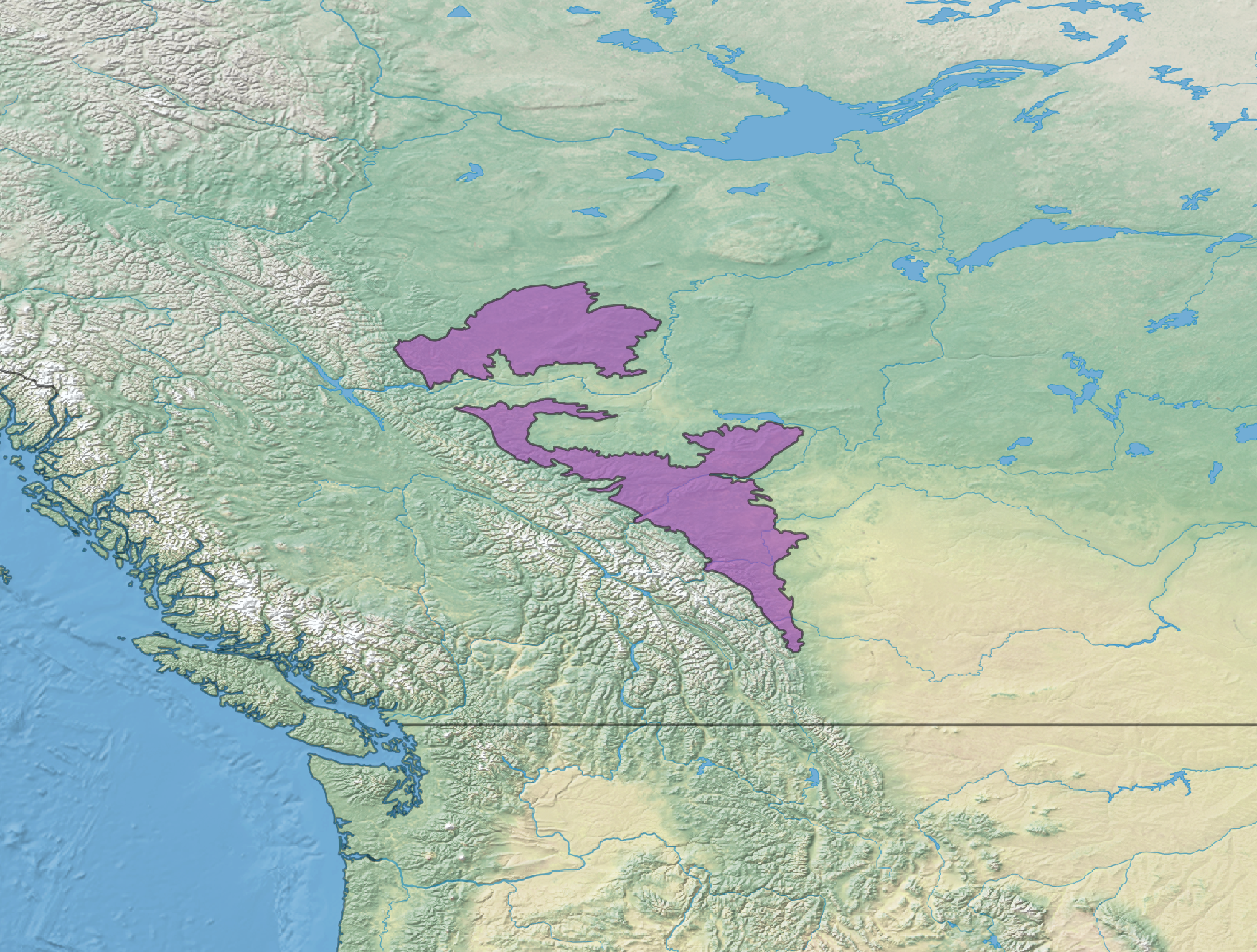
- Alberta–British Columbia foothills forests highlighted

Ecology
- Realm: Nearctic
- Biome: Temperate coniferous forests
- Borders: List: Alberta Mountain forests; Canadian aspen forests and parklands; Central British Columbia Mountain forests; Mid-Continental Canadian forests; Muskwa-Slave Lake forests; North Central Rockies forests; Northern Cordillera forests
- Bird species: 182
- Mammal species: 61

Geography
- Area: 120,500 km^{2} (46,500 mi^{2})
- Country: Canada
- States: Alberta; British Columbia
- Climate type: Humid continental (Dfb) and subarctic (Dfc)

Conservation
- Conservation status: Critical/Endangered
- Habitat loss: 5.0598%
- Protected: 47%

The Alberta–British Columbia foothills forests are a temperate coniferous forests ecoregion of Western Canada, as defined by the World Wildlife Fund (WWF) categorization system. This ecoregion borders Canada's taiga and contains a mix of subarctic forest and temperate forest species as a result. This makes the region an ecotone region, or a region that acts as a buffer between two other biomes.

== Setting ==
This ecoregion covers two separate areas: the rolling foothills of the Rocky Mountains of Alberta and further west a smaller area of the hills and valleys of central British Columbia. The Clear Hills in the north of the region are steeper.

Average annual temperature vary from −0.5 to 2 °C (31 to 36 °F) with the summer temperatures around 14 °C (57 °F) dropping in winter to −17.5 °C (0 °F) in the north and −10 °C (14 °F) in the south.

== Flora ==
The forests are a mixture dominated by lodgepole pine (Pinus contorta), jack pine (Pinus banksiana), trembling aspen (Populus tremuloides), black spruce (Picea mariana), and white spruce (Picea glauca). Other trees include balsam poplar (populus balsamifera), paper birch (Betula papyrifera), balsam fir (Abies balsamifera) and tamarack (Larix laricina).

== Fauna ==
These foothills are home to the largest populations of moose (Alces alces) in North America. Other mammals include snowshoe hare (Lepus americanus), beaver (Castor canadensis), muskrat (Ondatra zibethica), wolf (Canis lupus) and two subspecies of black bear the cinnamon bear (Ursus americanus cinnamomum) of the Rocky Mountains and the eastern black bear (Ursus americanus americanus) of the Canadian Taiga.

Birds of the area include sandhill cranes (Grus canadensis), ruffed grouse (Bonasa umbellus), spruce grouse (Falcipennis canadensis) and large numbers of waterbirds and New World warblers (Parulidae).

== Threats and preservation ==
These forests have been extensively altered by human activity, especially clearance for planting.

== See also ==
- List of ecoregions in Canada (WWF)
