= Alberta Mountain forests =

Temperate coniferous forests ecoregion of Alberta and British Columbia, Canada

Coordinates: 53.0000°N 118.0000°W

Alberta Mountains forest
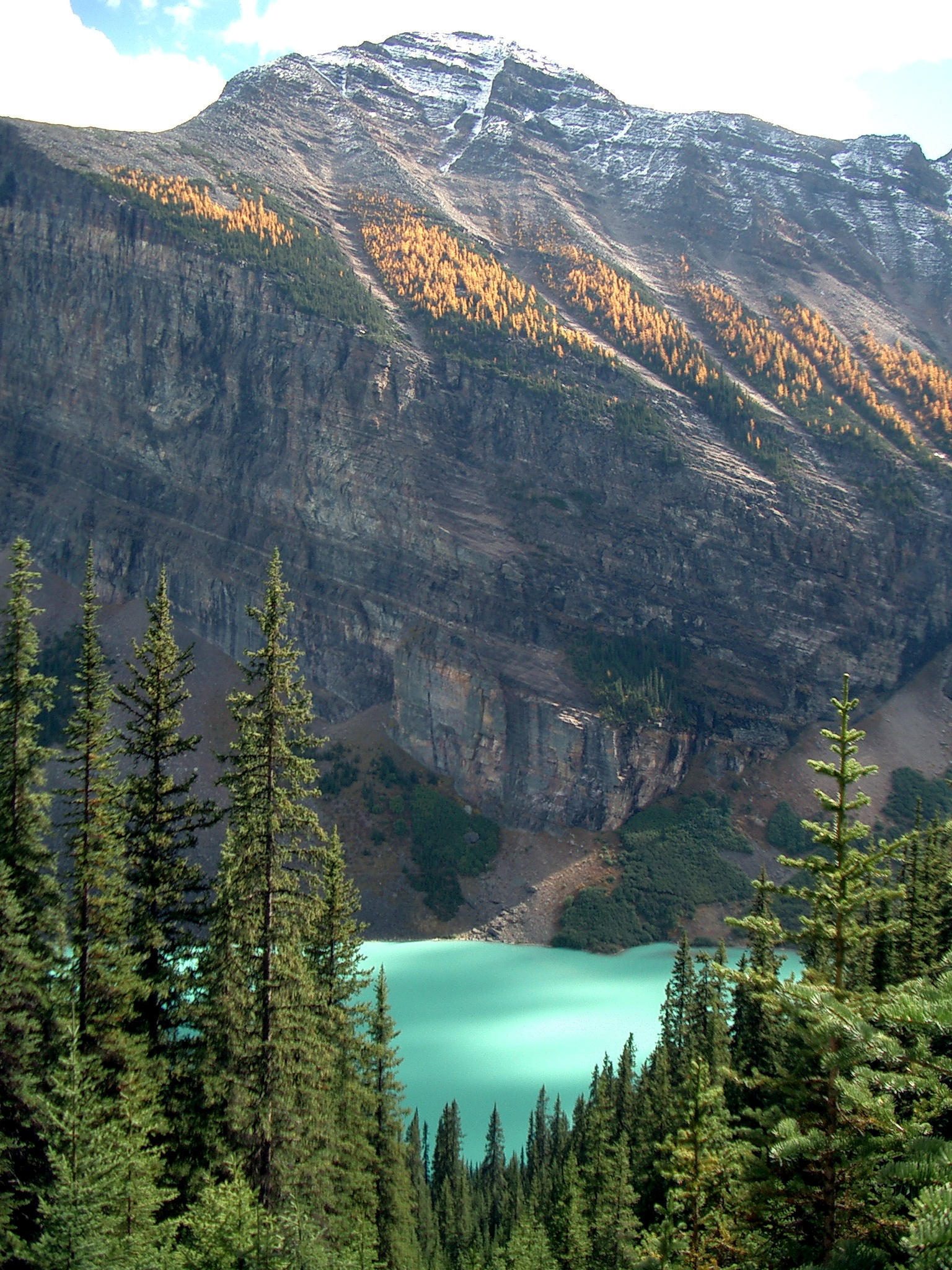
- Spruce forest around Lake Louise in Banff National Park

Ecology
- Realm: Nearctic
- Biome: Temperate coniferous forests
- Borders: Alberta-British Columbia foothills forests; Central British Columbia Mountain forests; North Central Rockies forests
- Bird species: 179
- Mammal species: 57

Geography
- Area: 39,800 km^{2} (15,400 mi^{2})
- Country: Canada
- Provinces: Alberta; British Columbia
- Climate type: Highly variable

Conservation
- Conservation status: Relatively Stable/Intact
- Habitat loss: 56.25%
- Protected: 63.85%

The Alberta Mountain forests are a temperate coniferous forests ecoregion of Western Canada, as defined by the World Wildlife Fund (WWF) categorization system.

== Setting ==
This ecoregion covers the Rocky Mountains of Alberta including the eastern outliers of the Continental Ranges. Located almost entirely in Alberta and taking in the Alberta–British Columbia border from Banff north to Jasper and Kakwa Wildlands Park, this is an area of glaciers and high mountains covered with a forest of tall trees. The highest points are the mountains around the Columbia Icefield, the largest ice field in the Rockies.

The mountain valleys have a mild climate with warm, dry summers and snowy winters, but the high mountain sides have a harsher climate. Average summer temperatures are 12 °C going down to −7 °C in winter.

== Flora ==
Trees include trembling aspen (Populus tremuloides), lodgepole pine (Pinus contorta), Engelmann spruce (Picea engelmannii), white spruce (Picea glauca), subalpine fir (Abies lasiocarpa) and Rocky Mountain Douglas-fir (Pseudotsuga menziesii var. glauca) as minor component in the central and southern part of the ecoregion.

== Fauna ==
These mountains are home to good numbers of large mammals. All five species of North American deer inhabit this ecoregion including woodland caribou (Rangifer tarandus caribou), elk (Cervus elaphus), moose (Alces alces andersoni), mule deer (Odocoileus hemionus), and white-tailed deer (northern Rocky Mountains/tawny white-tail) (Odocoileus virginianus ochrourus). Bighorn sheep (Ovis canadensis), and mountain goat (Oreamnos americanus) can also be found here. Predators in the mountains and forests include lynx (Lynx canadensis), coyote (Canis latrans), grizzly bear (Ursus arctos horribilis), black bear (Ursus americanus cinnamomum), cougar (Puma concolor couguar), red fox (Vulpes vulpes), and wolf (Canis lupus). Smaller wildlife such as snowshoe hare (Lepus americanus), and American pygmy shrew (Sorex hoyi) can be found here as well and the Banff Springs snail (Physella johnsoni) which is endemic to Banff National Park. Birds include Townsend's warbler (Setophaga townsendi), Clark's nutcracker (Nucifraga columbiana), Black-billed magpie (Pica hudsonia), veery (Catharus fuscescens), and bald eagle (Haliaeetus leucocephalus).

== Threats and preservation ==
80% of these forests are intact although some is being removed for urban development and tourism in the valley areas. Large areas of natural habitat remain in Banff National Park, Jasper National Park, Kakwa Wildlands, Willmore Wilderness Park, and Ghost River Wilderness Area.

This ecozone corresponds to the human region called Alberta's Rockies.

== See also ==
- List of ecoregions in Canada (WWF)
