= North Central Rockies forests =

Temperate coniferous forest ecoregion in Canada and the United States

Coordinates: 49°N 115°W

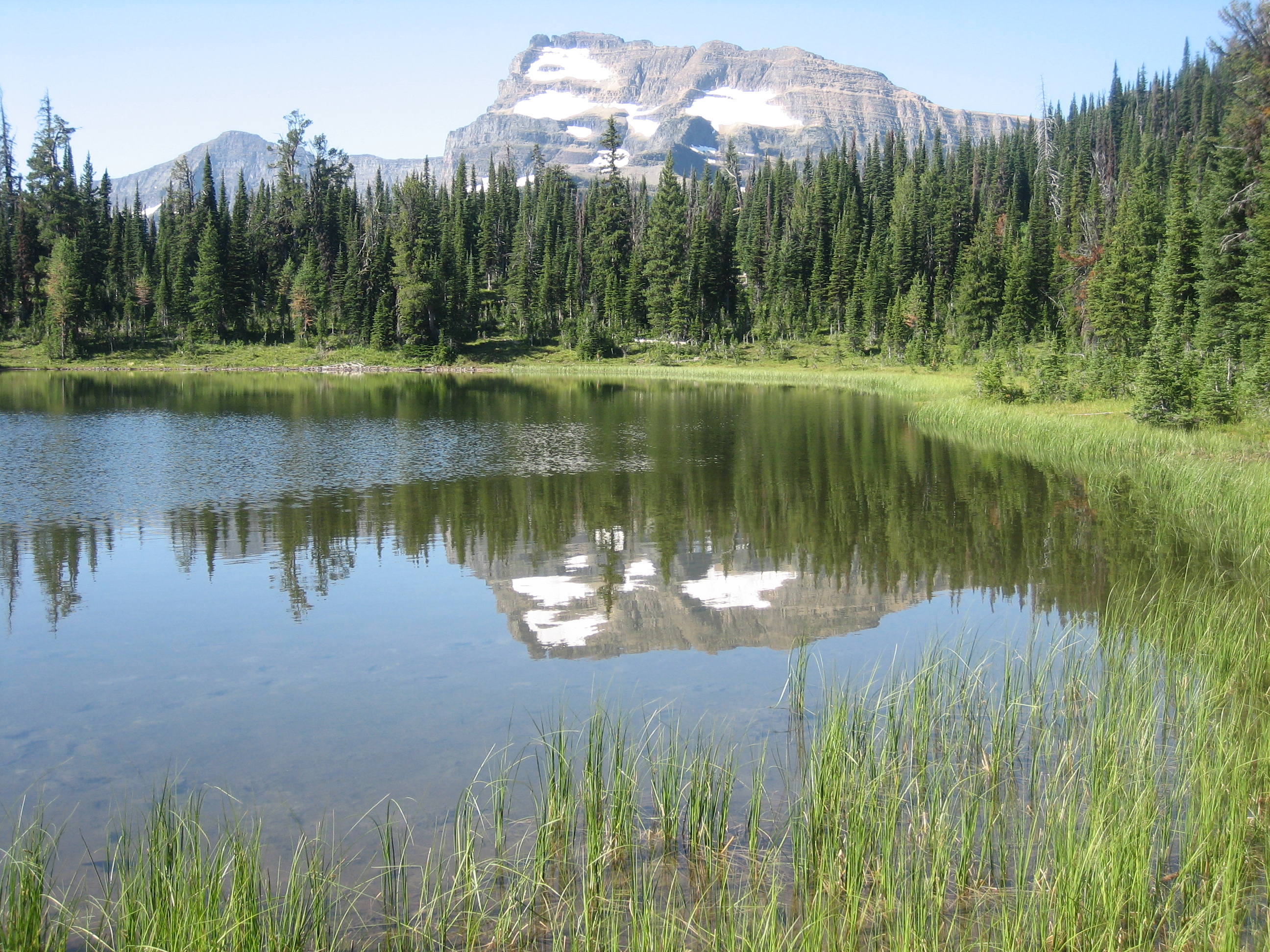
- Waterton Lakes National Park, Alberta

Ecology
- Realm: Nearctic
- Biome: Temperate coniferous forests
- Borders: List: Alberta Mountain forests; Alberta-British Columbia foothills forests; Canadian aspen forests and parklands; Central British Columbia Mountain forests; Fraser Plateau and Basin complex; Montana Valley and Foothill grasslands; Okanagan dry forests; Palouse grasslands; South Central Rockies forests
- Bird species: 219
- Mammal species: 79

Geography
- Area: 245,700 km^{2} (94,900 mi^{2})
- Countries: United States; Canada
- States/Provinces: Idaho; Montana; Washington; British Columbia; Alberta
- Rivers: Columbia River
- Climate type: Highly variable

Conservation
- Conservation status: Vulnerable
- Habitat loss: 2.1976%
- Protected: 39.72%

The North Central Rockies forests is a temperate coniferous forest ecoregion of Canada and the United States. This region overlaps in large part with the North American inland temperate rainforest and gets more rain on average than the South Central Rockies forests and is notable for containing the only inland populations of many species from the Pacific coast.

== Setting ==
This ecoregion is located in the Rocky Mountain regions of southeastern British Columbia, southwestern Alberta, northwestern Montana, northern Idaho, and northeastern Washington. The climate here is varied.

Areas west of the Continental Divide experience greater precipitation and the moderating effects of the Pacific Ocean, while areas east of the Divide experience a drier, more continental climate. In the Canadian portion of the ecoregion, mean annual temperatures range from 3.5 °C (38.3 °F) in the east to 5.5 °C (41.9 °F) west, summer mean temperatures range from 12.5 °C (54.5 °F) to 14.5 °C (58.1 °F), and average winter temperatures range from −3.5 °C (25.7 °F) to −6.5 °C (20.3 °F).

Valleys experience warm, wet summers and mildly cold, snowy winters, while subalpine zones experience cool, wet summers with the possibility of frosts, and very cold, snowy winters. Precipitation is moderate to high, with valleys usually receiving between 500 millimetres (20 in) and 800 millimetres (31 in), and high elevations receiving well over 1,000 millimetres (39 in).

== Flora ==
This ecoregion is predominantly coniferous forest. Lower elevation forests are dominated by Western hemlock (Tsuga heterophylla), Western red cedar (Thuja plicata) and Subalpine fir (Abies lasiocarpa), with medium-smaller and mixed populations of Lodgepole pine (Pinus contorta), Rocky mountain douglas-fir (Pseudotsuga menziesii var. glauca), Ponderosa pine (Pinus ponderosa), Western white pine (Pinus monticola), Mountain hemlock (Tsuga mertensiana) and Western larch (Larix occidentalis). Subalpine zones are dominated by Engelmann spruce (Picea engelmanni), Subalpine fir (Abies lasiocarpa). In areas affected by fire, there is the Lodgepole pine (Pinus contorta). This ecoregion also contains meadows, foothill grasslands, riverside woodlands, and tree line/alpine zone communities.

== Fauna ==
Mammals of the North Central Rockies forests include the gray wolf (Canis lupus), grizzly bear (Ursus arctos horriblus), wolverine (Gulo gulo), woodland caribou (Rangifer tarandus caribou), black bear (Ursus americanus cinnamomum), mountain goat (Oreamnos americanus), mule deer (Odocoileus hemonius), white-tailed deer (Odocoileus virginianus), Rocky Mountain elk (Cervus canadensis nelson), moose (Alces alces), coyote (Canis latrans), cougar (Puma concolor), bobcat (Lynx rufus), fisher (Martes pennanti), red fox (Vulpes vulpes), groundhog (Marmota monax) and American marten (Martes americana).

== Conservation status and protected areas ==
Though large portions of this ecoregion are intact and protected, its conservation status is listed as "vulnerable". The main threats to this ecoregion's integrity are resource extraction and development, increasing human activity, logging, mining, livestock grazing and the introduction of exotic species.

Protected areas in this ecoregion include Glacier National Park and Bob Marshall Wilderness Complex in northwestern Montana, Yoho and Kootenay National Parks in southeastern British Columbia, Waterton Lakes National Park in far southwestern Alberta and the Selway-Bitterroot Wilderness in northeastern Idaho.

== See also ==
- List of ecoregions in Canada (WWF)
- List of ecoregions in the United States (WWF)
- North American inland temperate rainforest
