= Tā Ch'ilā Provincial Park =

Provincial park in British Columbia, Canada

- IUCN category II (national park)
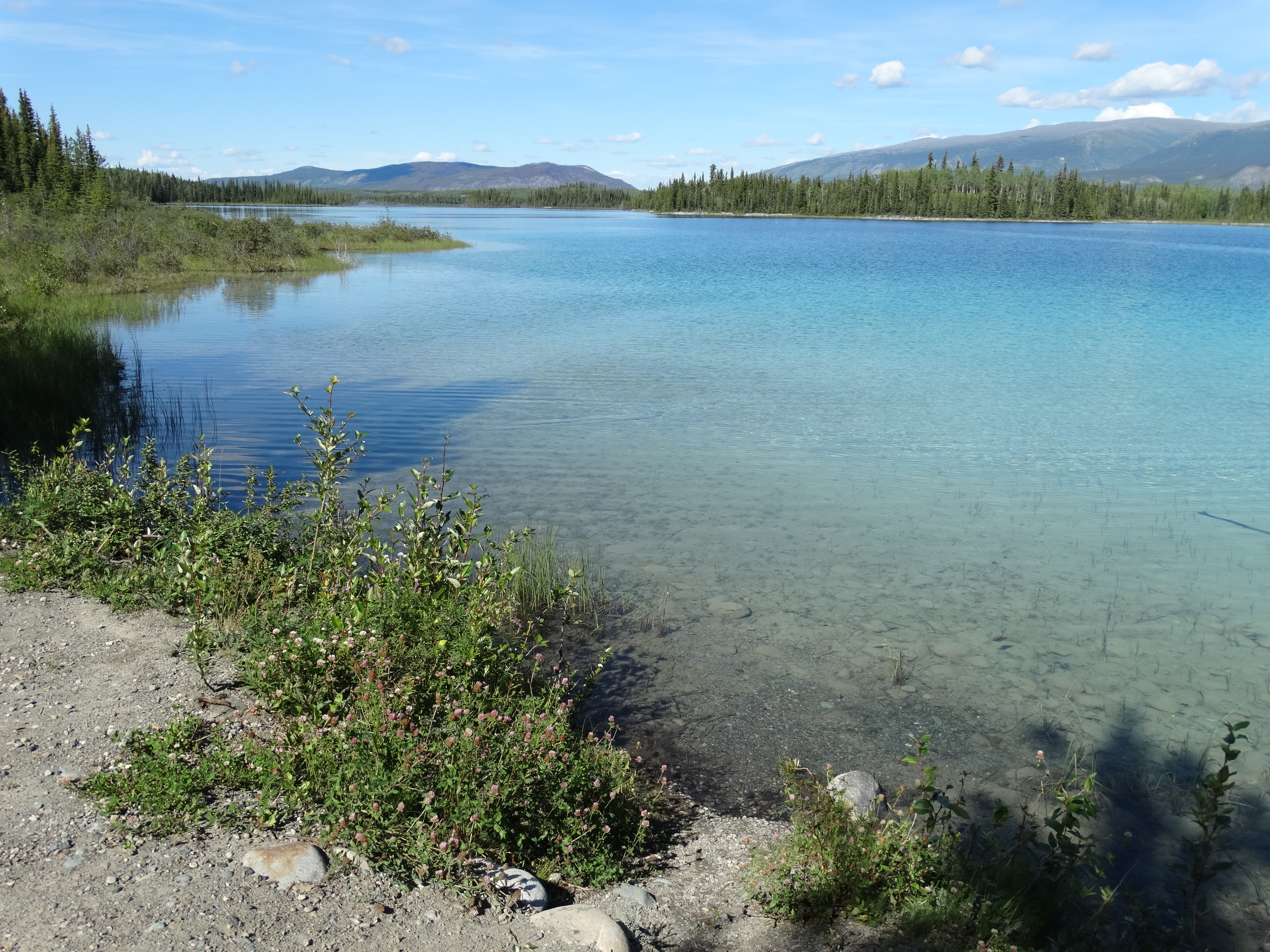
- Panoramic view

- Location within British Columbia
- Interactive map of Tā Ch'ilā Provincial Park
- Location: British Columbia, Canada
- Nearest city: Fort St. John
- Coordinates: 59°22′59″N 129°05′24″W
- Area: 47.28 km^{2} (18.25 sq mi)
- Established: November 30, 1965
- Governing body: BC Parks

Tā Chʼilā Provincial Park, formerly Boya Lake Provincial Park, is a provincial park located in the Stikine Region of British Columbia, Canada. The park located 120 km north-by-northwest of the community of Dease Lake near BC Highway 37 (the Stewart–Cassiar Highway). Boya Lake is named for Charlie Boya, a First Nations man from the area.
