= Torngat Mountain tundra =

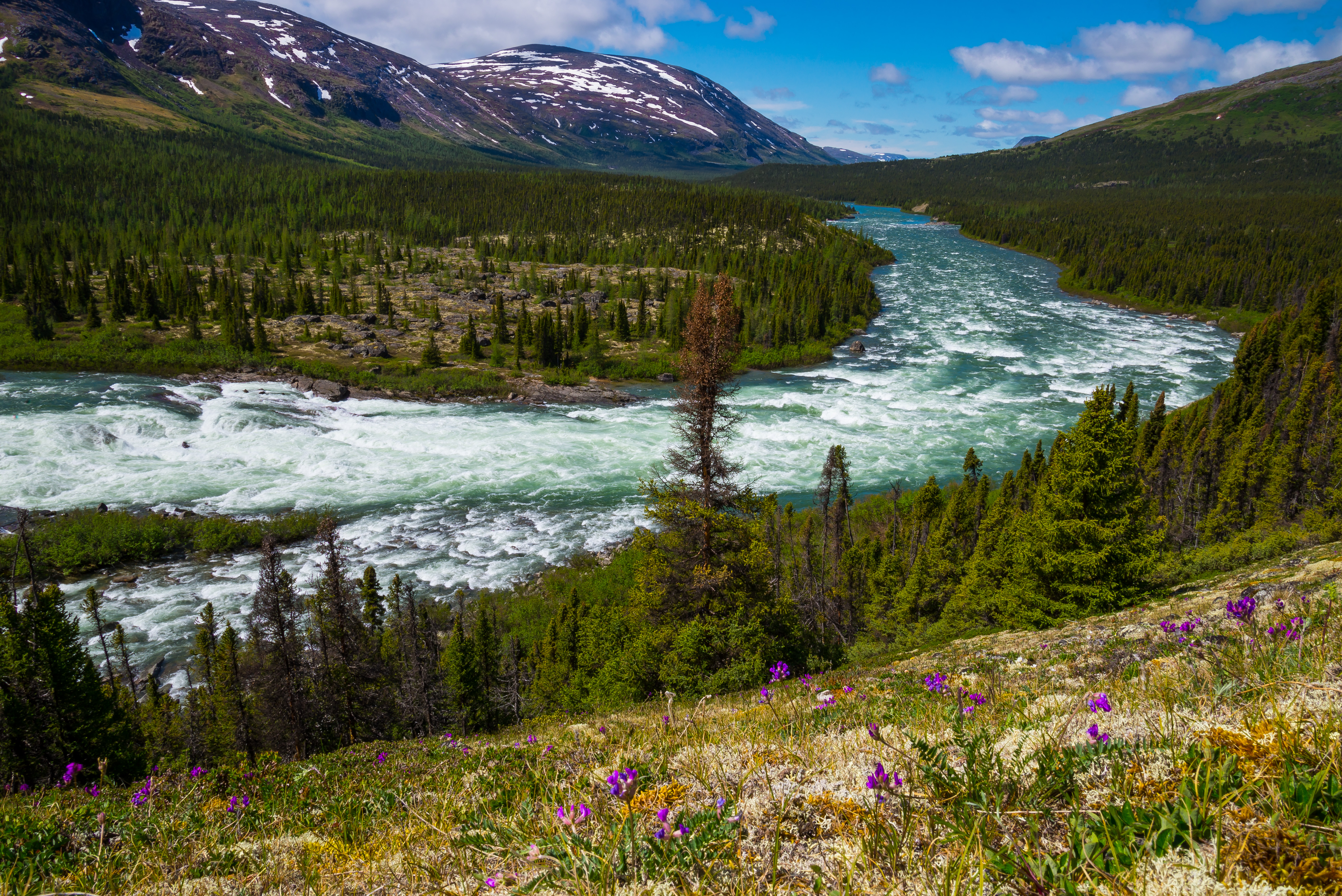
- Korok River in Kuururjuaq National Park

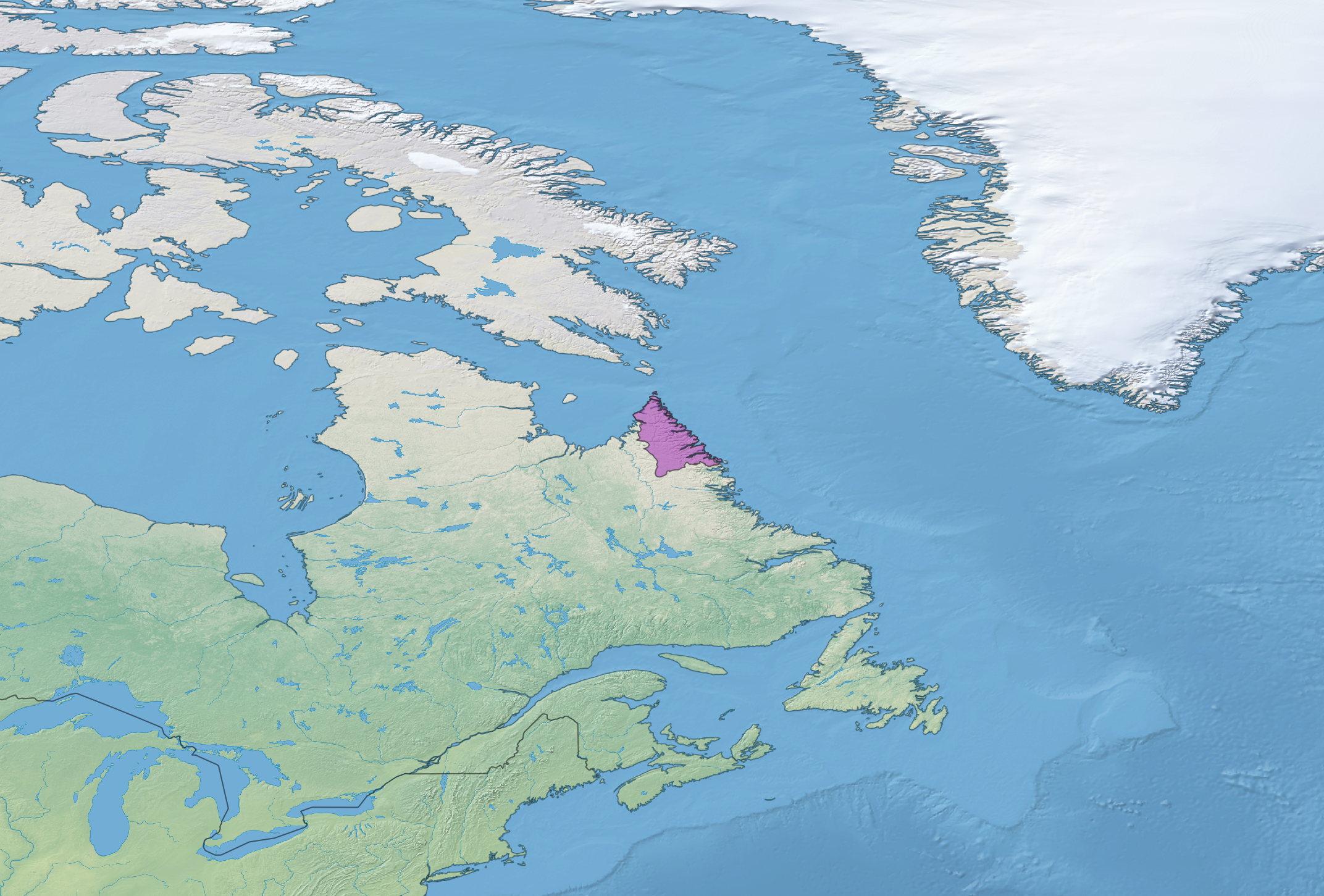
- Map of the Torngat Mountain tundra

Ecology
- Realm: Nearctic
- Biome: Tundra

Geography
- Area: 32,363 km^{2} (12,495 mi^{2})
- Country: Canada
- Coordinates: 58.75°N 64.5°W

The Torngat Mountain tundra ecoregion (WWF ID: NA1118) covers the Torngat Mountains on the northeastern tip of the Labrador Peninsula where the provinces of Quebec and Newfoundland and Labrador meet. The mountains feature glacially carved U-shaped valleys and deep fjords. The vegetation over most of the territory is that of arctic tundra (lichen, moss, sedges and grasses), herbaceous cover, or bare rock. The region supports seasonal polar bears, black bears, and caribou. The Atlantic coast is on the Atlantic Flyway for migratory birds.

== Location and description ==
The Torngat Mountains are the southernmost range of the Arctic Cordillera, a chain of mountain ranges that reach 2,500 km to the northern point of Ellesmere Island. The Torngat Mountains form a peninsula between Ungava Bay on the west and the Atlantic Ocean on the east. The ecoregion is only 100 km wide, and 300 km north to south. Rising from sea level, the mean elevation is 490 metres (1,610 ft) meters, and the highest point 1,498 metres (4,915 ft). The west side is continuous permafrost; the eastern (Atlantic coast side) has discontinuous permafrost. The bordering ecoregion on the west and south is the Eastern Canadian Shield taiga.

== Climate ==
The climate of the ecoregion is Tundra climate (Köppen climate classification ET), a local climate in which at least one month has an average temperature high enough to melt snow (0 °C (32 °F)), but no month with an average temperature in excess of 10 °C (50 °F). Precipitation averages 300-700 mm/year; average temperature in the winter is −16.5 °C (2.3 °F) and 4 °C (39 °F) in the summer.

== Flora and fauna ==
Ground cover in the region is 68% moss and lichen, 15% herbaceous cover, and less than 1% evergreen forest. The remainder is bare rock, sparse vegetation or open water. The areas with mixed evergreen and deciduous shrubs tend to be on sheltered, south-facing slopes. Where tundra and open forest meet there is often a transition zone of birch/willow thickets.

Mammals are mostly small species, but there are noteworthy populations of polar bears (Ursus maritimus) denning in the region seasonally, an unusual community of tundra-dwelling black bears (Ursus americanus), and a herd of Torngat caribou.

== Protected areas ==
Over 41% of the ecoregion is officially protected. These protected areas include:

- Kuururjuaq National Park
- Torngat Mountains National Park
- Ulittaniujalik National Park
