= Central Canada =

Region of Eastern Canada

Central Canada Centre du Canada (French)
- Region
- Map of Central Canada, defined politically
- Coordinates: 50°N 79°W
- Country: Canada
- Provinces: Ontario; Quebec
- Canadian Confederation: 1 July 1867

Area (2021 - land, 2017 - fresh water)
  - Total: 2,552,291.51 km^{2} (985,445.26 sq mi)
  - Land: 2,191,011.51 km^{2} (845,954.27 sq mi)
  - Water: 361,280.00 km^{2} (139,490.99 sq mi)

Population (2021)
  - Total: 22,725,775
  - Density: 10.4/km^{2} (27/sq mi)

Time zones
- Western Ontario: UTC−06:00 (CST)
  - Summer (DST): UTC−05:00 (CDT)
- Eastern Ontario / most of Quebec: UTC−05:00 (EST)
  - Summer (DST): UTC−04:00 (EDT)
- Eastern Quebec: UTC−04:00 (AST)
  - Summer (DST): UTC−03:00 (ADT)
- Largest city: Toronto
- Largest metro: Greater Toronto Area

Central Canada (French: Centre du Canada, sometimes the Central Provinces) is a Canadian region consisting of Ontario and Quebec, the largest and most populous provinces of the country. Geographically, they are not at the centre of Canada but instead overlap with Eastern Canada toward the east. Because of their large populations, Ontario and Quebec have traditionally held a significant amount of political power in Canada, leading to some amount of resentment from other regions of the country. Before Confederation, the term "Canada" specifically referred to Central Canada. Today, the term "Central Canada" is less often used than the names of the individual provinces.

== History ==
Before Confederation, the region known as Canada was what is now called Central Canada. Southern Ontario was once called Upper Canada and later Canada West and southern Quebec was called Lower Canada and later Canada East. Both were part of the United Province of Canada in 1841.

== Geography ==
Ontario, Canada's fourth largest subdivision (after Nunavut, Quebec, and the Northwest Territories), had, at the 2021 Canadian census, a land area of 892,411.76 km^{2} (344,562.11 sq mi) (10.15 percent of Canada and the fifth largest after Nunavut, Quebec, the Northwest Territories, and British Columbia) and as of 2017, there was 177,390 km^{2} (68,490 sq mi) (21.55 percent of Canada and the second largest after Quebec) of freshwater, for a total area of 1,069,801.76 km^{2} (413,052.77 sq mi) (11.13 percent of Canada).

Quebec, Canada's second largest subdivision and largest province, had, at the 2021 Canadian census, a land area of 1,298,599.75 km (806,912.47 mi) (14.78 percent of Canada and the second largest after Nunavut), and as of 2017, there was 183,890 km^{2} (71,000 sq mi) (22.34 percent and the largest in Canada) of freshwater, for a total area of 1,482,489.75 km^{2} (572,392.49 sq mi) (15.42 percent of Canada).

Together the two provinces have a land area of 2,191,011.51 km^{2} (845,954.27 sq mi) (24.93 percent), 361,280.00 km^{2} (139,490.99 sq mi) (43.89 percent) fresh water for a total area of 2,552,291.51 km^{2} (985,445.26 sq mi) (26.55 percent).

Although the region is called Central Canada the actual centre of Canada can be defined in multiple ways. The longitudinal centre of Canada is located just east of Winnipeg, Manitoba, on Highway 1 East, part of the Trans-Canada Highway. The latitudinal centre is at 62 degrees, 24 minutes north, meaning the geographic centre of Canada is located just south of Yathkyed Lake, Nunavut.

=== Physical geography ===
==== Ontario ====
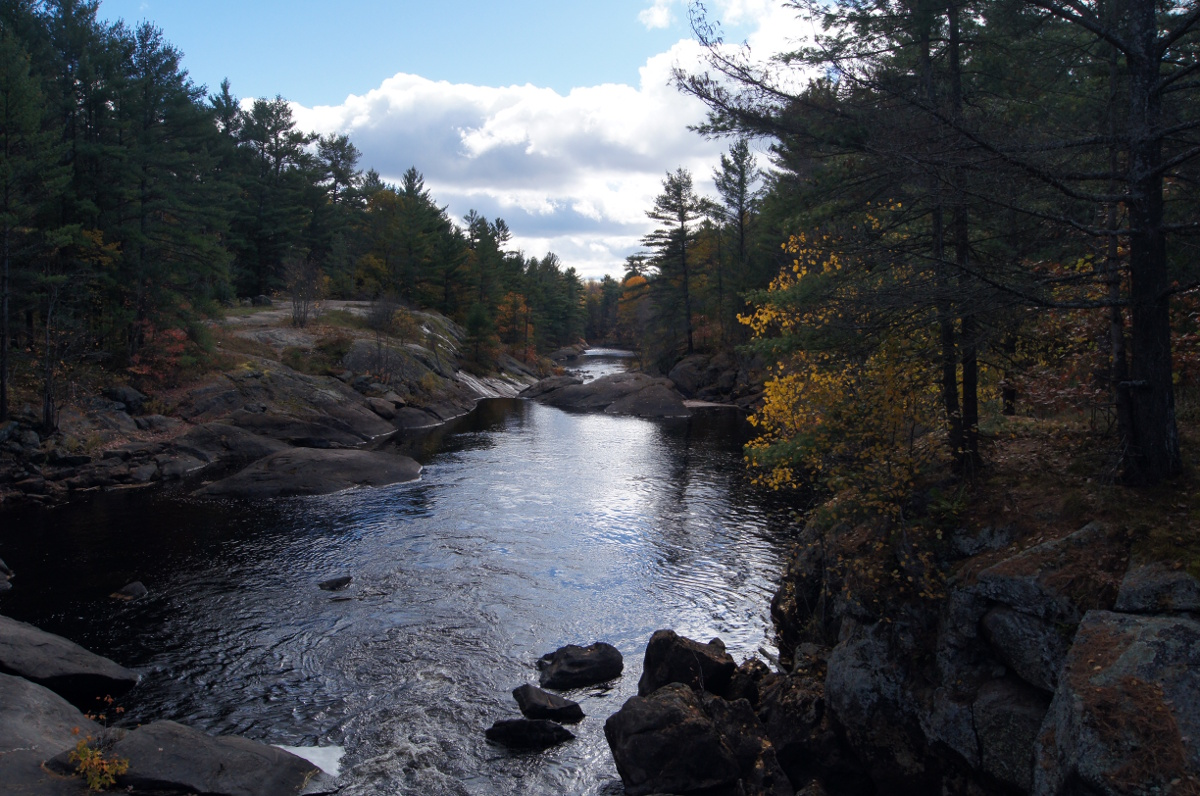
Typical landscape of the Canadian Shield at Queen Elizabeth II Wildlands Provincial Park, located in Central Ontario.

The thinly populated Canadian Shield, which dominates the northwestern and central portions of the province, comprises over half the land area of Ontario. Although this area mostly does not support agriculture, it is rich in minerals, partly covered by the Central and Midwestern Canadian Shield forests, and studded with lakes and rivers. Northern Ontario is subdivided into two sub-regions: Northwestern Ontario and Northeastern Ontario.

The virtually unpopulated Hudson Bay Lowlands in the extreme north and northeast are mainly swampy and sparsely forested.

Southern Ontario is further sub-divided into four sub-regions: Central Ontario (although not actually the province's geographic centre), Eastern Ontario, Golden Horseshoe and Southwestern Ontario (parts of which were formerly referred to as Western Ontario).

Despite the rarity of mountainous terrain in the province, there are large areas of uplands, particularly within the Canadian Shield, which traverses the province from northwest to southeast and also above the Niagara Escarpment, which crosses the south. The highest point is Ishpatina Ridge at 693 metres (2,274 feet) above sea level in Temagami, Northeastern Ontario. In the south, elevations of over 500 m (1,640 ft) are surpassed near Collingwood, above the Blue Mountains in the Dundalk Highlands and in hilltops near the Madawaska River in Renfrew County.

The Carolinian forest zone covers most of the southwestern region of the province. The temperate and fertile Great Lakes-Saint Lawrence Valley in the south is part of the Eastern Great Lakes lowland forests ecoregion where the forest has now been largely replaced by agriculture, industrial and urban development. A well-known geographic feature is Niagara Falls, part of the Niagara Escarpment. The Saint Lawrence Seaway allows navigation to and from the Atlantic Ocean as far inland as Thunder Bay in Northwestern Ontario. Northern Ontario covers approximately 87% of the province's surface area; conversely, Southern Ontario contains 94% of the population.

Point Pelee is a peninsula of Lake Erie in southwestern Ontario (near Windsor and Detroit, Michigan) that is the southernmost extent of Canada's mainland. Pelee Island and Middle Island in Lake Erie extend slightly farther. All are south of 42°N – slightly farther south than the northern border of California.

==== Quebec ====
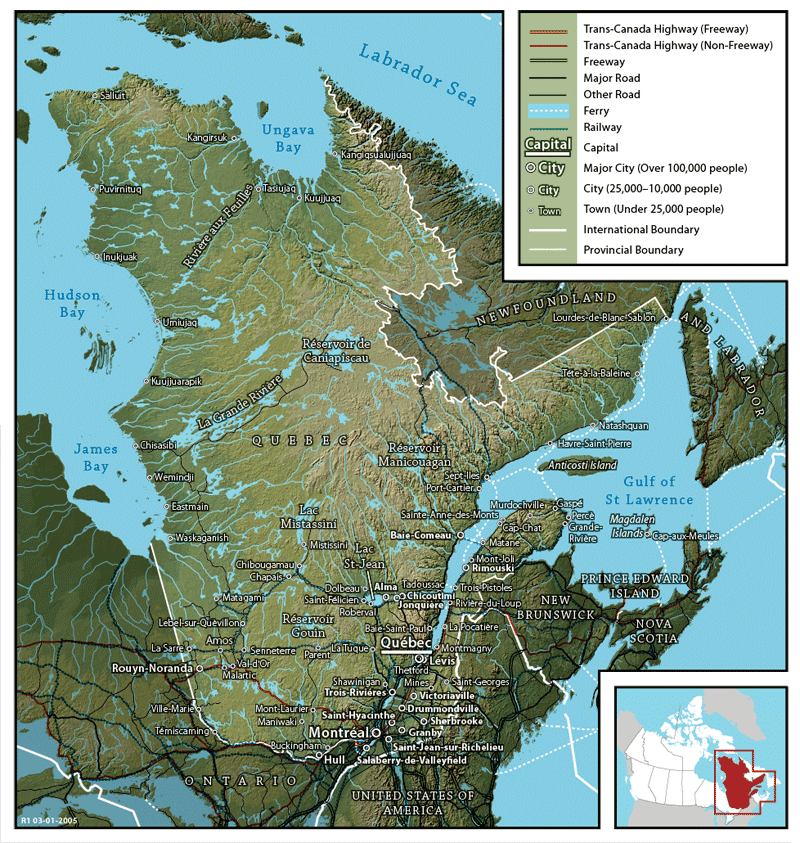
The Quebec territory.

Approximate areas of ecoregions: 1. Middle Arctic Tundra; 2. Low Arctic Tundra; 3. Torngat Mountain Tundra; 4. Eastern Canadian Shield Taiga; 5. Southern Hudson Bay Taiga; 6. Central Canadian Shield Forests; 7. Eastern Canadian Forests; 8. Eastern Forest/Boreal Transition; 9. Eastern Great Lakes Lowland Forests; 10. New England/Acadian Forests; 11. Gulf of St. Lawrence Lowland Forests

Located in the eastern part of Canada, Quebec occupies a territory nearly three times the size of France or Texas. It is much closer to the size of Alaska, covering 1.5 million square kilometres (0.58 million square miles), with borders more than 12,000 km (7,500 mi) long. It is the largest province in Canada and, by total area, the tenth-largest country subdivision in the world.

Most of Quebec is sparsely populated. Its most populous region is the Great Lakes–St. Lawrence Lowlands.

The combination of rich soils and the lowlands' relatively warm climate makes this valley its most prolific agricultural area. The rural landscape is divided into narrow rectangular tracts of land that extend from the river and date to the seigneurial system.

Quebec's topography is different from one region to another due to the varying composition of the ground, the climate, and the proximity to water. The Great Lakes–St. Lawrence Lowlands and the Appalachians are the two main topographic regions in southern Quebec, while the Canadian Shield occupies most of central and northern Quebec. 95% of the total, including the Labrador Peninsula, lies within the Canadian Shield. It is generally flat and exposed mountainous terrain interspersed with higher points such as the Laurentian Mountains in southern Quebec, the Otish Mountains in central Quebec and the Torngat Mountains near Ungava Bay. While low and medium altitude peaks extend from western Quebec to the far north, high altitude mountains appear in the Capitale-Nationale region to the east. Quebec's highest point at 1,652 metres (5,420 ft) is Mont d'Iberville, known in English as Mount Caubvick, in the northeastern part of the province in the Torngat Mountains. In the Labrador Peninsula portion of the Shield, the far northern region of Nunavik includes the Ungava Peninsula and consists of flat Arctic tundra inhabited mostly by Inuit.

Further south is the Eastern Canadian Shield taiga ecoregion and the Central Canadian Shield forests. The Appalachian region has a narrow strip of ancient mountains along the southeastern border of Quebec.

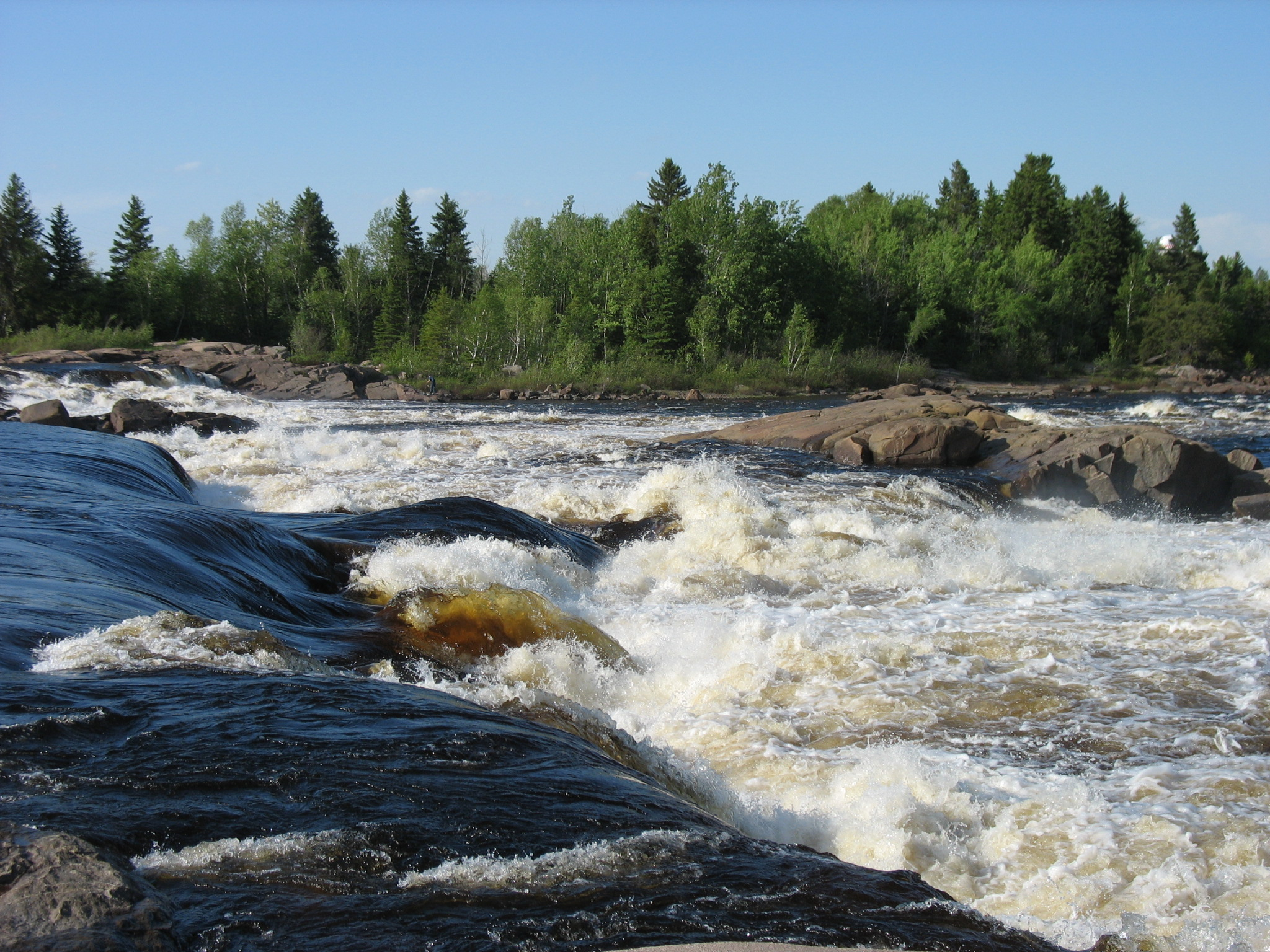
Michel's falls on Ashuapmushuan River in Saint-Félicien, Saguenay–Lac-Saint-Jean

Quebec has one of the world's largest reserves of fresh water, occupying 12% of its surface and representing 3% of the world's renewable fresh water. More than half a million lakes and 4,500 rivers empty into the Atlantic Ocean, through the Gulf of Saint Lawrence and the Arctic Ocean, by James, Hudson, and Ungava bays. The largest inland body of water is the Caniapiscau Reservoir; Lake Mistassini is the largest natural lake. The Saint Lawrence River has some of the world's largest sustaining inland Atlantic ports. Since 1959, the Saint Lawrence Seaway has provided a navigable link between the Atlantic Ocean and the Great Lakes.

The public lands of Quebec cover approximately 92% of its territory, including almost all of the water bodies. Protected areas can be classified into about twenty different legal designations (ex. exceptional forest ecosystem, protected marine environment, national park, biodiversity reserve, wildlife reserve, zone d'exploitation contrôlée (ZEC), etc.). More than 2,500 sites in Quebec today are protected areas. As of 2013, protected areas comprise 9.14% of Quebec's territory.

The ecological classification of Quebec territory established by the Ministry of Forests, Wildlife and Parks 2021, is presented in nine levels, it includes the diversity of terrestrial ecosystems throughout Quebec while taking into account both the characteristics of the vegetation (physiognomy, structure and composition) and the physical environment (relief, geology, geomorphology, hydrography).

The territory of Quebec is rich in resources in its coniferous forests, lakes, and rivers—pulp and paper, lumber, and hydroelectricity are some of the province's most important industries. The far north of the province, Nunavik, is subarctic or Arctic and is mostly inhabited by Inuit.

== Population ==
Ontario and Quebec are the two most populous provinces in Canada, accounting for 61.43 percent of Canada's population. As of the 2021 census conducted by Statistics Canada, there were 22,725,775 people in the two provinces, and represented an increase of 5.1 per cent over the 2016 census figure of 21,612,855 people. The land area was 2,191,011.51 km^{2} (845,954.27 sq mi) giving a population density of 10.4/km^{2} (26.9/sq mi).

The median age of Ontario was 41.6, identical to Canada as a whole, and Quebec's population was slightly older at 43.2.

Population of visible minority, Indigenous, and others (2021 Canadian census)
		Ontario		Quebec		Central Canada			Canada	
Population group		Population	% of province	Population	% of province	Population	% of Central Canada	% of Canada	Population	%
Non-visible minority or Indigenous		8,807,805	62.8%	6,762,735	81.4%	15,570,541	61.4%	42.9%	25,364,140	69.8%
Visible minority group	South Asian	1,515,295	10.8%	127,990	1.5%	1,643,285	7.4%	4.5%	2,571,400	7.1%
Visible minority group	Chinese	820,245	5.8%	115,240	1.4%	935,485	4.2%	2.6%	1,715,770	4.7%
Visible minority group	Black	768,740	5.5%	422,405	5.1%	1,191,145	5.3%	3.3%	1,574,870	4.3%
Visible minority group	Filipino	363,650	2.6%	44,885	0.5%	408,535	1.8%	1.1%	957,355	2.6%
Visible minority group	Arab	284,215	2.0%	280,075	3.4%	564,290	2.5%	1.6%	694,015	1.9%
Visible minority group	Latin American	249,190	1.8%	172,925	2.1%	422,115	1.9%	1.2%	580,235	1.6%
Visible minority group	Southeast Asian	167,845	1.2%	70,455	0.8%	238,300	1.1%	0.7%	390,340	1.1%
Visible minority group	West Asian	212,185	1.5%	43,985	0.5%	256,170	1.1%	0.7%	360,495	1.0%
Visible minority group	Korean	99,425	0.7%	10,360	0.1%	109,785	0.5%	0.3%	218,140	0.6%
Visible minority group	Japanese	31,420	0.2%	5,305	0.1%	36,725	0.2%	0.1%	98,890	0.3%
Visible minority group	Visible minority, n.i.e.	124,120	0.9%	12,150	0.1%	136,270	0.6%	0.4%	331,805	0.9%
Visible minority group	Multiple visible minority	181,025	1.3%	34,960	0.4%	215,985	1.0%	0.6%	172,885	0.5%
Total visible minority population		4,817,360	34.3%	1,340,735	16.1%	6,158,095	27.6%	17.0%	9,639,205	26.5%
Indigenous peoples
Indigenous peoples	First Nations (North American Indian)	251,030	1.8%	116,550	1.4%	367,580	1.6%	1.0%	1,048,405	2.9%
Indigenous peoples	Métis	134,615	1.0%	61,010	0.7%	195,625	0.9%	0.5%	624,220	1.7%
Indigenous peoples	Inuk (Inuit)	4,310	0.0%	15,800	0.2%	20,110	0.1%	0.1%	70,540	0.2%
Indigenous peoples	Multiple Indigenous responses	7,115	0.1%	3,135	0.1%	10,250	0.0%	0.0%	28,855	0.1%
Indigenous responses n.i.e.	9,515	0.1%	8,515	0.0%	18,030	0.1%	0.0%	35,225	0.1%	
Total Indigenous population		406,585	2.9%	205,010	2.5%	611,595	2.7%	1.7%	1,807,250	5.0%
Total population		14,031,750	100.00%	8,308,480	100.00%	22,340,230	100.00%	61.5%	36328480	100.00%

They are represented in the House of Commons of Canada by 200 Members of Parliament (Ontario: 122, Quebec: 78) out of a total of 343. The southern portions of the two provinces — particularly the Quebec City–Windsor Corridor — are the most urbanized and industrialized areas of Canada, containing the country's two largest cities, Toronto and Montreal, the national capital, Ottawa, and the National Capital Region.

As of the 2021 census Statistics Canada lists 24 Census Metropolitan Areas (CMA) in Central Canada. They include Ottawa - Gatineau as well as Ottawa - Gatineau (Ontario part) and Ottawa - Gatineau (Quebec part). All CMAs in Quebec are located in the southern part of the province. In Ontario, except Greater Sudbury / Grand Sudbury and Thunder Bay, which are in Northern Ontario, all CMAs are in Southern Ontario. The CMAs are listed here by population count:

Census Metropolitan Areas
Name	Province	Population	Land area	Density	Location	References
Toronto	Ontario	6,202,225	5,902.75 km^{2} (2,279.06 sq mi)	1,050.7/km^{2} (2,721.3/sq mi)	Central Canada is located in Southern Ontario	
Montreal	Quebec	4,291,732	4,670.1 km^{2} (1,803.1 sq mi)	919.0/km^{2} (2,380.2/sq mi)	Central Canada is located in Quebec South	
Ottawa - Gatineau	Ontario	1,488,307	8,046.99 km^{2} (3,106.96 sq mi)	185.0/km^{2} (479.1/sq mi)	Central Canada is located in Southern Ontario	
Ottawa - Gatineau (Ontario part)	Ontario	1,135,014	4,665.16 km^{2} (1,801.23 sq mi)	243.3/km^{2} (630.1/sq mi)	Central Canada is located in Southern Ontario	
Quebec City	Quebec	839,311	3,499.46 km^{2} (1,351.15 sq mi)	239.8/km^{2} (621.1/sq mi)	Central Canada is located in Quebec South	
Hamilton	Ontario	785,184	1,373.15 km^{2} (530.18 sq mi)	571.8/km^{2} (1,481.0/sq mi)	Central Canada is located in Southern Ontario	
Kitchener - Cambridge – Waterloo	Ontario	575,847	1,092.33 km^{2} (421.75 sq mi)	527.2/km^{2} (1,365.4/sq mi)	Central Canada is located in Southern Ontario	
London	Ontario	543,551	2,661.48 km^{2} (1,027.60 sq mi)	204.2/km^{2} (528.9/sq mi)	Central Canada is located in Southern Ontario	
St. Catharines - Niagara	Ontario	433,604	1,397.09 km^{2} (539.42 sq mi)	310.4/km^{2} (803.9/sq mi)	Central Canada is located in Southern Ontario	
Windsor	Ontario	422,630	1,803.17 km^{2} (696.21 sq mi)	234.4/km^{2} (607.1/sq mi)	Central Canada is located in Southern Ontario	
Oshawa	Ontario	415,311	903.25 km^{2} (348.75 sq mi)	459.8/km^{2} (1,190.9/sq mi)	Central Canada is located in Southern Ontario	
Ottawa – Gatineau (Quebec part)	Quebec	353,293	3,381.83 km^{2} (1,305.73 sq mi)	104.5/km^{2} (270.7/sq mi)	Central Canada is located in Quebec South	
Sherbrooke	Quebec	227,398	1,458.1 km^{2} (563.0 sq mi)	156.0/km^{2} (404.0/sq mi)	Central Canada is located in Quebec South	
Barrie	Ontario	212,856	897.26 km^{2} (346.43 sq mi)	237.2/km^{2} (614.3/sq mi)	Central Canada is located in Southern Ontario	
Kingston	Ontario	172,546	1,919.17 km^{2} (741.00 sq mi)	89.9/km^{2} (232.8/sq mi)	Central Canada is located in Southern Ontario	
Greater Sudbury / Grand Sudbury	Ontario	170,605	4,187.4 km^{2} (1,616.8 sq mi)	40.7/km^{2} (105.4/sq mi)	Central Canada is located in Ontario	
Guelph	Ontario	165,588	595.08 km^{2} (229.76 sq mi)	278.3/km^{2} (720.8/sq mi)	Central Canada is located in Southern Ontario	
Saguenay	Quebec	161,567	3,133.53 km^{2} (1,209.86 sq mi)	51.6/km^{2} (133.6/sq mi)	Central Canada is located in Quebec South	
Trois-Rivières	Quebec	161,489	1,038.64 km^{2} (401.02 sq mi)	155.5/km^{2} (402.7/sq mi)	Central Canada is located in Quebec South	
Brantford	Ontario	144,162	1,074.0 km^{2} (414.7 sq mi)	134.2/km^{2} (347.6/sq mi)	Central Canada is located in Southern Ontario	
Peterborough	Ontario	128,624	1,508.44 km^{2} (582.41 sq mi)	85.3/km^{2} (220.9/sq mi)	Central Canada is located in Southern Ontario	
Thunder Bay	Ontario	123,258	2,550.79 km^{2} (984.87 sq mi)	48.3/km^{2} (125.1/sq mi)	Central Canada is located in Ontario	
Belleville - Quinte West	Ontario	111,184	1,337.5 km^{2} (516.4 sq mi)	83.1/km^{2} (215.2/sq mi)	Central Canada is located in Southern Ontario	
Drummondville	Quebec	101,610	1,094.36 km^{2} (422.53 sq mi)	92.8/km^{2} (240.4/sq mi)	Central Canada is located in Quebec South	

== See also ==
- Central United States
- Great Lakes region
