= Innuit Mountain =

Mountain in Labrador, Canada

Highest point
- Elevation: 1,509 m (4,951 ft)
- Prominence: 1,239 m (4,065 ft)
- Coordinates: 59°03′31″N 64°06′58″W

Geography
- Location: Labrador, Canada
- Parent range: Torngat Mountains
- Topo map: NTS 24P1 Komaktorvik Lakes

Innuit Mountain is a mountain located 30 km (19 mi) northwest of Mount Caubvick in the Torngat Mountains of northern Labrador, Canada.

== Situation ==
Innuit Mountain lies at the head of Nachvak Fiord and has a twin summit called Packard Mountain.
