= Tivi Etok =

Canadian Inuk illustrator and printmaker (1929–2025)

- Born: 1929; Quebec, Canada
- Died: 1 May 2025 (aged 95–96)
- Education: Puvirnituq, Quebec
- Known for: Illustrator and printmaker

Tivi Etok (1929 – 1 May 2025) was a Quebec Inuk artist, illustrator, and printmaker. In 1975, he was the first Inuk printmaker to have a collection of his own prints released.

== Early life ==
Etok was born in the camp of Qirnituartuq, which is in proximity of the Kangiqsualujjuaq region, Nunavik, Quebec. His mother was named Sarah, and his brother, Joe Willie. Etok's family originated from the Tasiujaq region, later moving to the areas of Nachvak Fiord in Labrador's Torngat Mountains, and the Koroc River area of Quebec's Ungava Bay watershed.

== Career ==
In 1967, he befriended anthropologist Donat Savoie, who stayed with Etok and his family while conducting research for his masters thesis. The household included Etok, Sarah, and Joe, as well as Etok's wife, Susie (née Baron; 1939–2006) of Koroc River, and children, Minnie, Tomasi, Aatami, and Charlie. Etok and Savoie's friendship has persisted throughout the years, even after Savoie became a government official.

After attending a print workshop in Puvirnituq, in the 1970s, Etok learned how to earn money as a printmaker.

== Later life and death ==
"Our Elders used to tell us that our future was going to be hard and life would be more difficult. Their predictions were very true." (Etok, 2007)

Now considered an Inuk Elder, a trilingual (Inuktitut, English and French) biography of Etok's life was written by Jobie Weetaluktuk, and published in Nunavik in 2008. The previous year, Scott Heyes' 2007 study entitled Inuit Knowledge and Perceptions of the Land-Water Interface, researched Kangiqsualujjuaq people, especially their knowledge and perceptions of their surroundings, and included Etok, plus three generations of his family.

Etok died on 1 May 2025, at the age of 95–96.
