= Bryant Pass =

Mountain pass in Labrador, Canada

Coordinates: 59°35′01″N 64°00′53″W

Bryant Pass is a mountain pass at the northern end of the Labrador Peninsula in Labrador, Canada. It is northwest of Mount Pinsent and the Four Peaks, which are in the Torngat Mountains between Miriam Lake and Ryans Bay of the Labrador Sea.
