= Kangiqsualujjuaq =

Kangiqsualujjuaq ᑲᖏᕐᓱᐊᓗᑦᔪᐊᖅ
- Northern village municipality
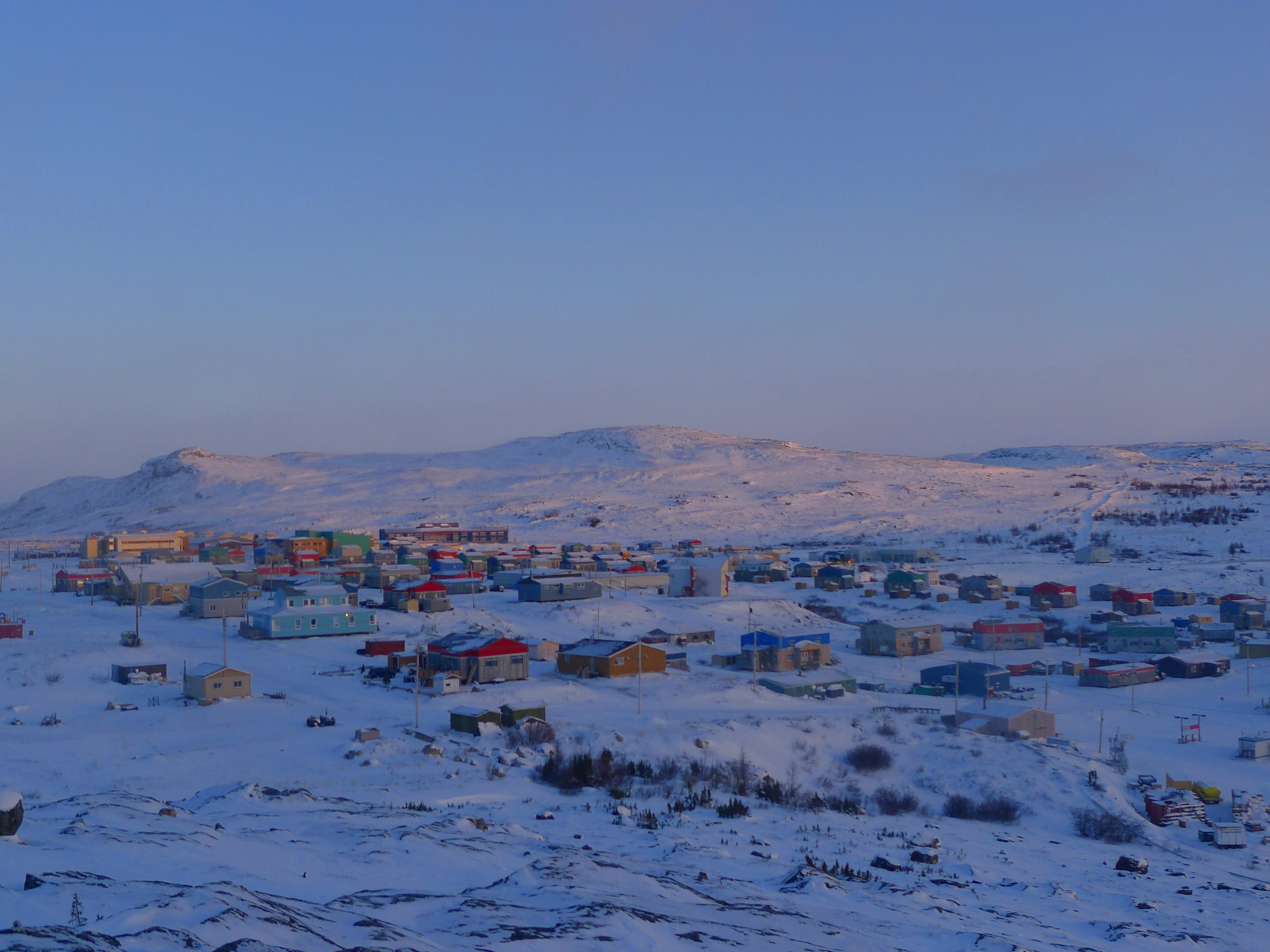

- Location within Quebec
- Coordinates: 58°41′N 65°57′W
- Country: Canada
- Province: Quebec
- Region: Nord-du-Québec
- TE: Kativik
- Constituted: February 2, 1980

Government
  - Mayor: Hilda Snowball
  - Federal riding: Abitibi—Baie-James—Nunavik—Eeyou
  - Prov. riding: Ungava

Area
  - Total: 35.50 km^{2} (13.71 sq mi)
  - Land: 34.33 km^{2} (13.25 sq mi)

Population (2021)
  - Total: 956
  - Density: 27.9/km^{2} (72/sq mi)
  - Change (2016–21): ▲1.5%
  - Dwellings: 270
- Time zone: UTC−5 (EST)
  - Summer (DST): UTC−4 (EDT)
- Postal code(s): J0M 1N0
- Area code: 819
- Website: www.nvkangiqsualujjuaq.ca

Kangiqsualujjuaq (/kænˌdʒɪksuˈæluːdʒuæk/ kan-JIK-soo-AL-oo-joo-ak; Inuktitut: [kaŋiqsu.alujːu.ˈaq]; French: [kɑ̃dʒiksɥalydʒɥak]) is an Inuit village located at the mouth of the George River on the east coast of Ungava Bay in Nunavik, Quebec, Canada. Its population was 956 as of the 2021 census.

The settlement's original name, Fort Severight, honoured John Severight, a North West Company man who had headed Fort Coulonge during McLean's time there. After its re-establishment, it was variously known from its location as Fort George, George's River, George River, George River Post, and Fort George River. It was also sometimes known as Port-Nouveau-Québec (French for "Port New Quebec").

The name "Kangiqsualujjuaq" (Inuktitut: ᑲᖏᖅᓱᐊᓗᔾᔪᐊᖅ) is Inuktitut for "the very large bay". It is also sometimes spelled "Kangirsualujjuaq" (ᑲᖏᕐᓱᐊᓗᔾᔪᐊᖅ).

== History ==
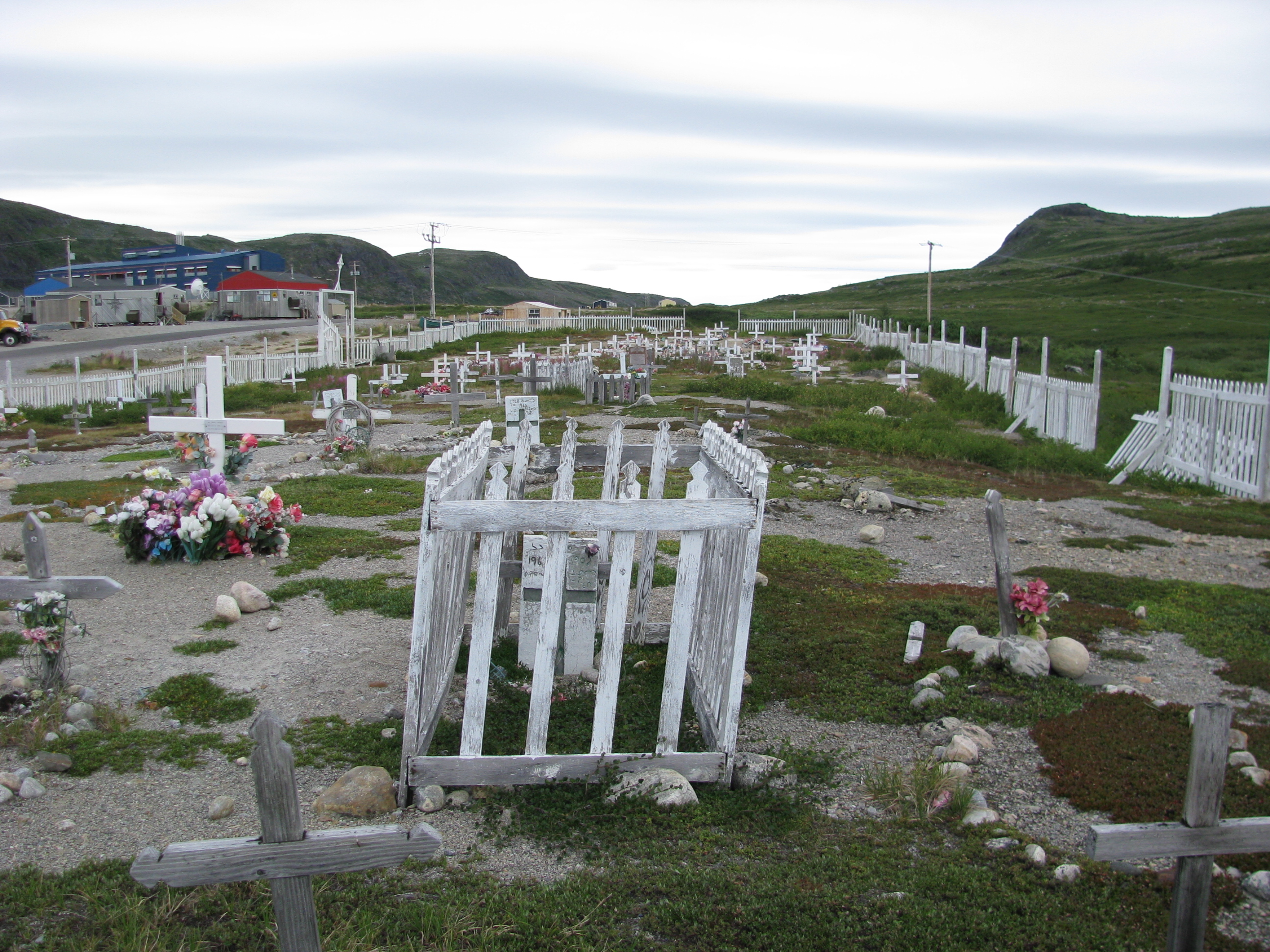
Kangiqsualujjuaq cemetery

John McLean established Fort Severight for the Hudson's Bay Company in 1838. It was a bit south of the present-day town, at 58°31′43.03″N 65°53′34.58″W (now marked as Illutaliviniq on topographic maps). It served as a salmon and seal fishery, supplying Fort Chimo to the west and Fort Trial and Fort Nascopie to the south. It was abandoned in 1842 after Fort Chimo turned out to be an unprofitable station and a path was found to supply Nascopie from Fort Smith to the southeast. The Inuit of the area never settled around the post, preferring to live along the coast in summer and setting their camps about 50 km (31 mi) inland in winter.

The site was taken up again in September 1876, mostly to capture the local indigenous peoples' trade which had been going to the Moravians. The new buildings were built from the old. The site was abandoned again in the summer of 1878 before reopening again in 1883. It again functioned as a salmon and seal fishery for Fort Chimo, although it carried on some local trading until that was removed to Port Burwell in 1917. HBC shuttered its office in June 1952.

In 1959, local Inuit established, on their own initiative, the first co-operative in Northern Quebec for the purpose of marketing Arctic char. Construction of the village began in 1962 and Inuit began to settle there permanently. In 1963 a school, a co-operative store, and government buildings were built. In 1980, Kangiqsualujjuaq was legally established as a municipality.

The community was struck by an avalanche in the early morning of January 1, 1999, which destroyed the Satuumavik School gymnasium during New Year celebrations, killing nine. Another 25 people were injured, 12 of them seriously enough to have to be airlifted 1,500 km (930 mi) to Montreal for treatment. Some speculated that it may have been triggered by lively dancing at the party. The school was rebuilt on the new, safer location and renamed to Ulluriaq School.

== Geography ==
Kangiqsualujjuaq is located 1,688 km (1,049 mi) to the northeast of Montreal. Enveloped by mountains, the township is framed by picturesque surroundings and its elevated position affords unobstructed views of the George River. The town itself is laid out on a grid pattern over levelled-ground, with two unsealed roads leading a few kilometres beyond the mountain ridges at either end of the village. Amidst rocky outcrops and stone way-finding markers (Inukshuk), the village landscape is dotted with stands of stunted trees and prostrate groundcover that clings perilously to the rugged granite terrain. In low-lying areas, the ground is covered by thick carpets of moss and lichen.

== Demographics ==
In the 2021 Census of Population conducted by Statistics Canada, Kangiqsualujjuaq had a population of 956 living in 247 of its 270 total private dwellings, a change of 1.5% from its 2016 population of 942. With a land area of 34.33 km^{2} (13.25 sq mi), it had a population density of 27.8/km^{2} (72.1/sq mi) in 2021.

== Economy ==
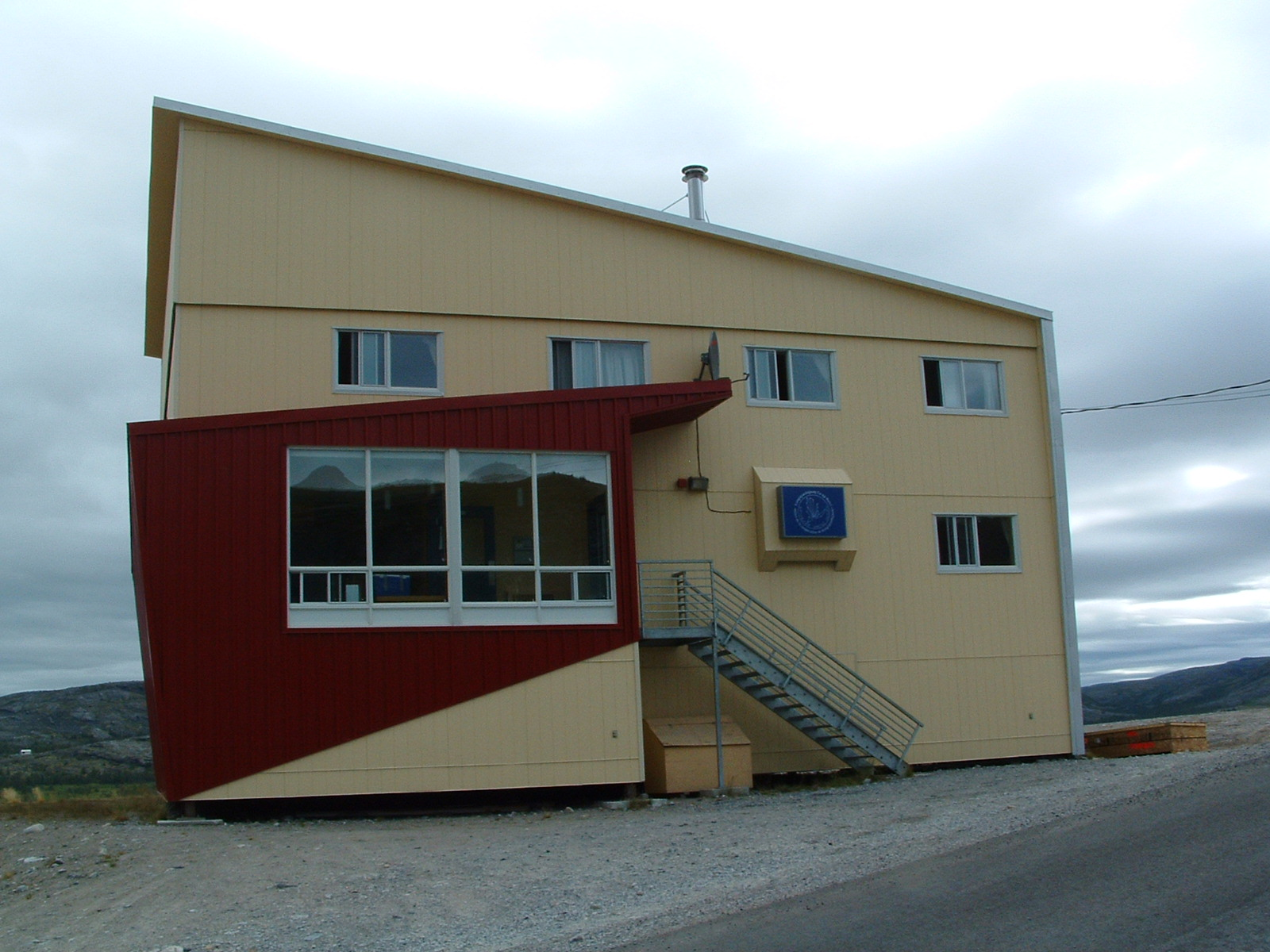
Kangiqsualujjuaq Hotel

Industries in Kangiqsualujjuaq include hunting of caribou, seal and beluga whale, Arctic char fishing, and the production of Inuit art. The town is also the main terminus of the George River canoeing expeditions (e.g. one of Chewonki Foundation's canoe trips).

== Government ==
The police services are provided by the Kativik Regional Police Force. The Kativik School Board formerly operated the Ulluriaq School, previously the Satuumavik School.

== Infrastructure ==
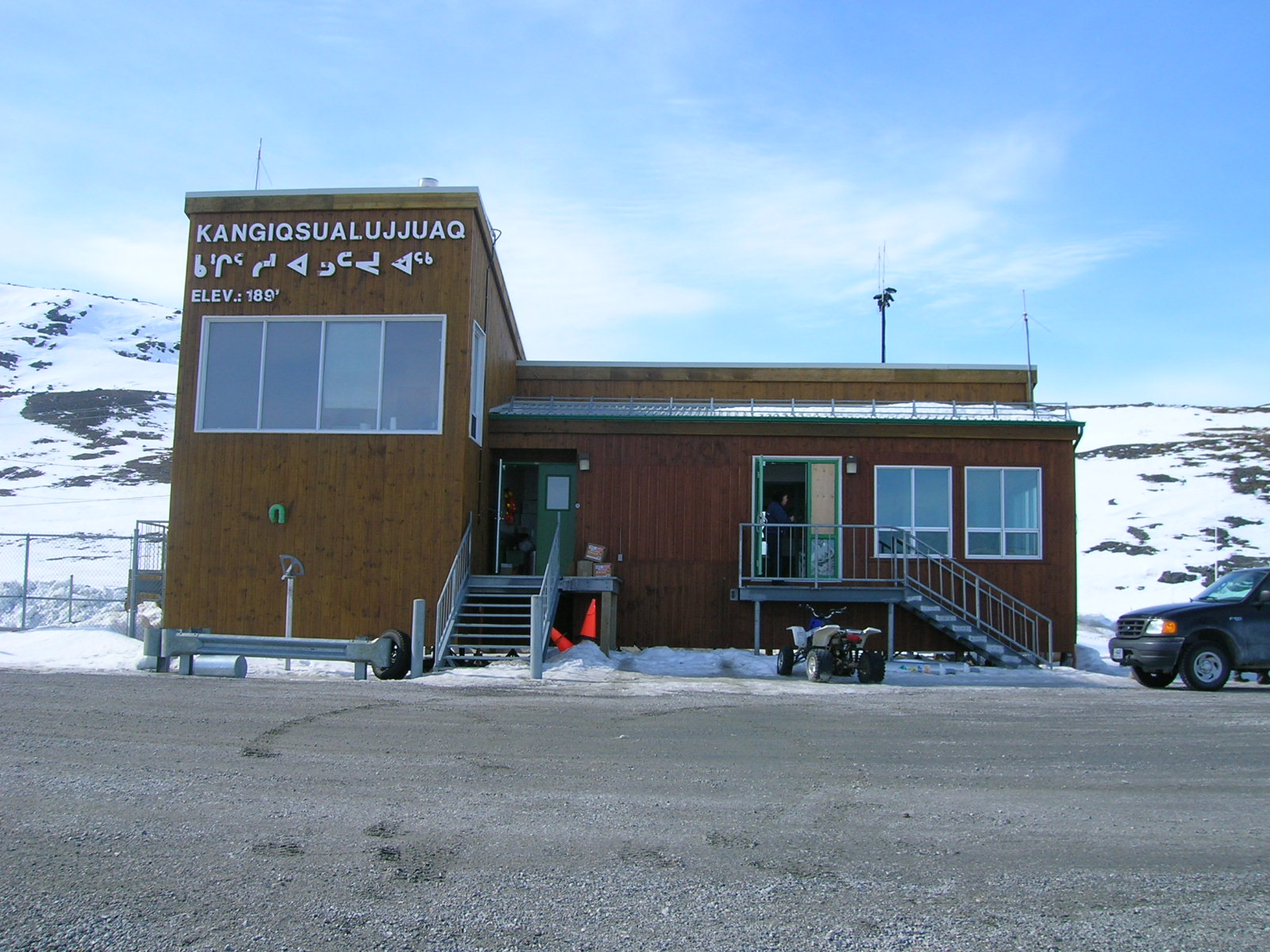
Kangiqsualujjuaq's airport in April 2006

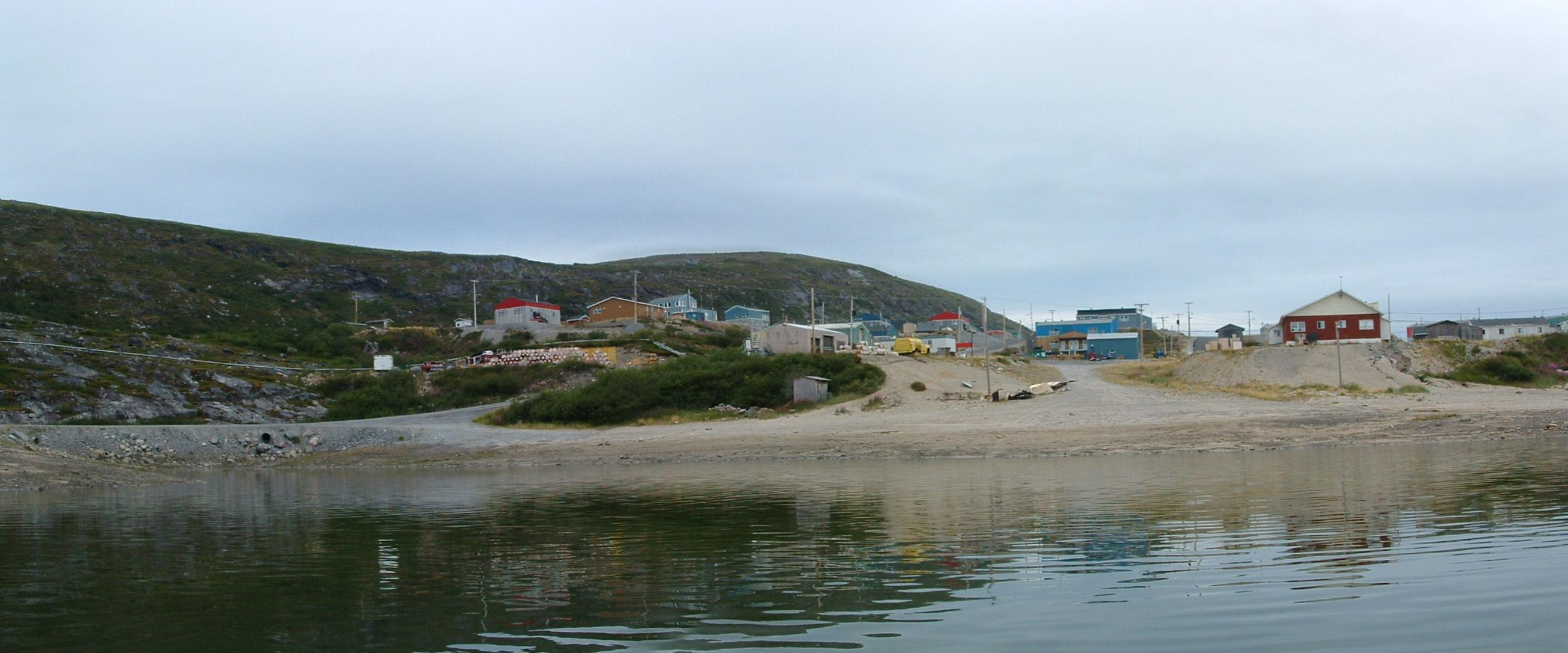
Kangiqsualujjuaq Harbour at high tide

The town is served by the small Kangiqsualujjuaq Airport. Access is usually by plane, although Kangiqsualujjuamiut occasionally travel to Kuujjuaq in winter by snowmobile and in summer by boat, a journey of approximately 160 km (99 mi) to the southwest. Journeys across the Torngat Mountains by snowmobile to the Labrador settlements Nain and Nachvak are rarely embarked upon these days, but were commonplace when dog teams were used. Cargo ships from Becancour deliver cumbersome supplies and equipment to the community every summer.

== Notable people ==
- Mary Simon (Ningiukadluk), 30th Governor General of Canada
- Johnny May
- Donat Savoie

Inuit elders from Kangiqsualujjuaq include:

- Noah Angnatuk
- George Annanack
- Johnny Sam Annanack
- Maggie Annanack (Elsie Imaq)
- Sarah Annanack
- Willie Emudluk
- Tivi Etok
- Willie Etok
- Benjamin Jararuse

Explorers and missionaries who have visited the town include:

- Mina Benson Hubbard
- George Kmoch
- Benjamin Gottlieb Kohlmeister
- Albert Peter Low
- John McLean

== Images ==
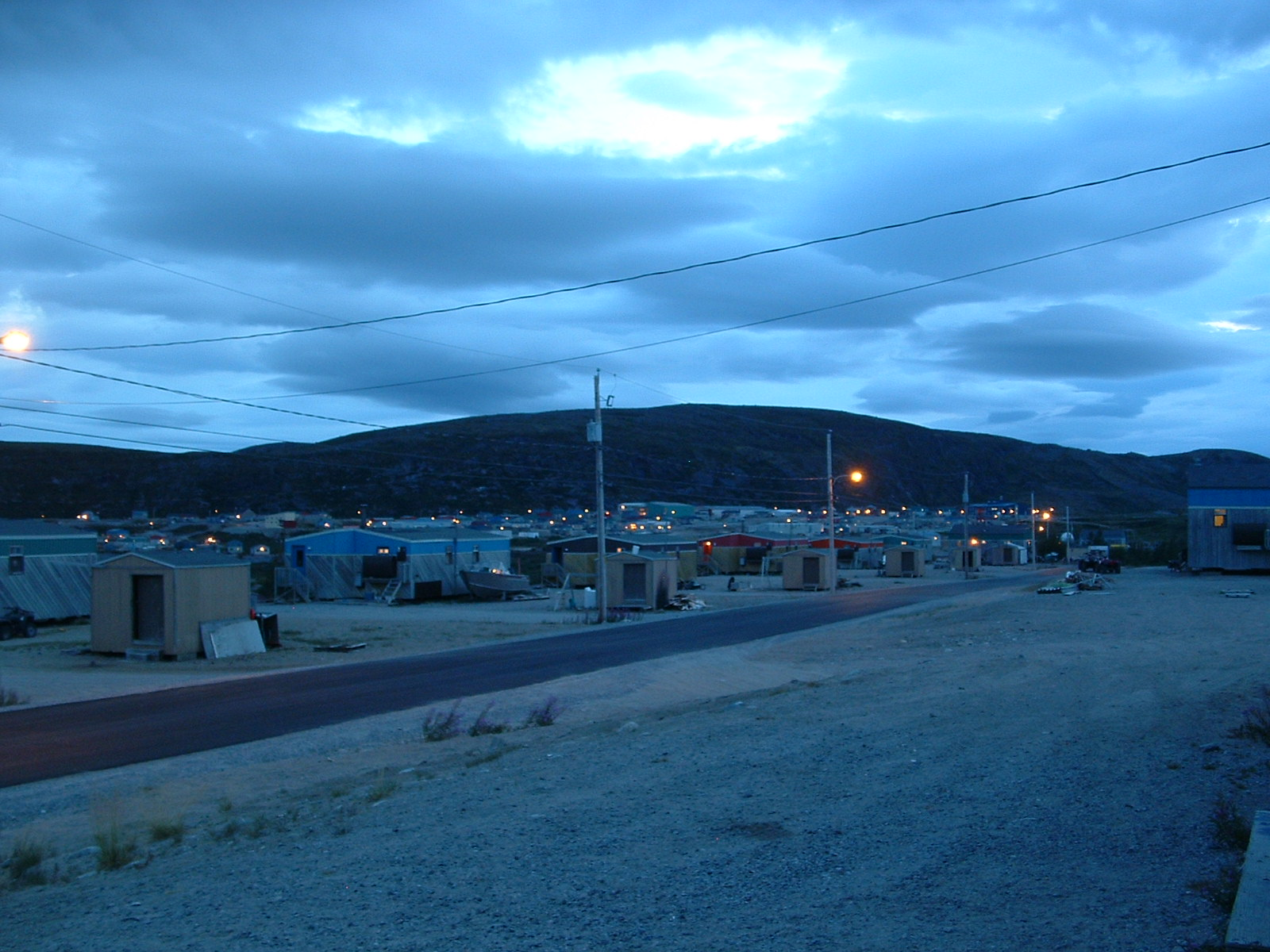
Kangiqsualujjuaq at night

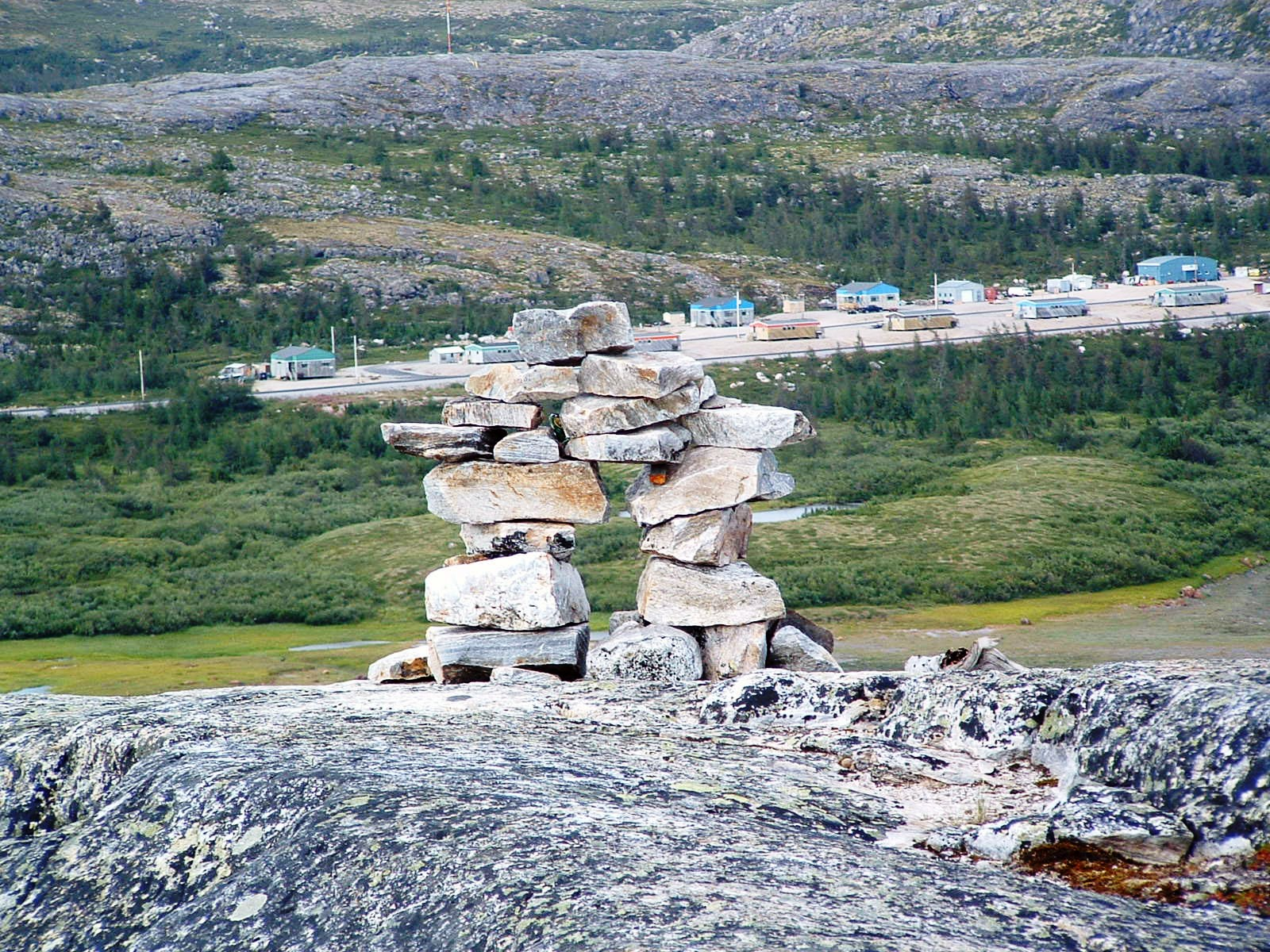
Inukshuk

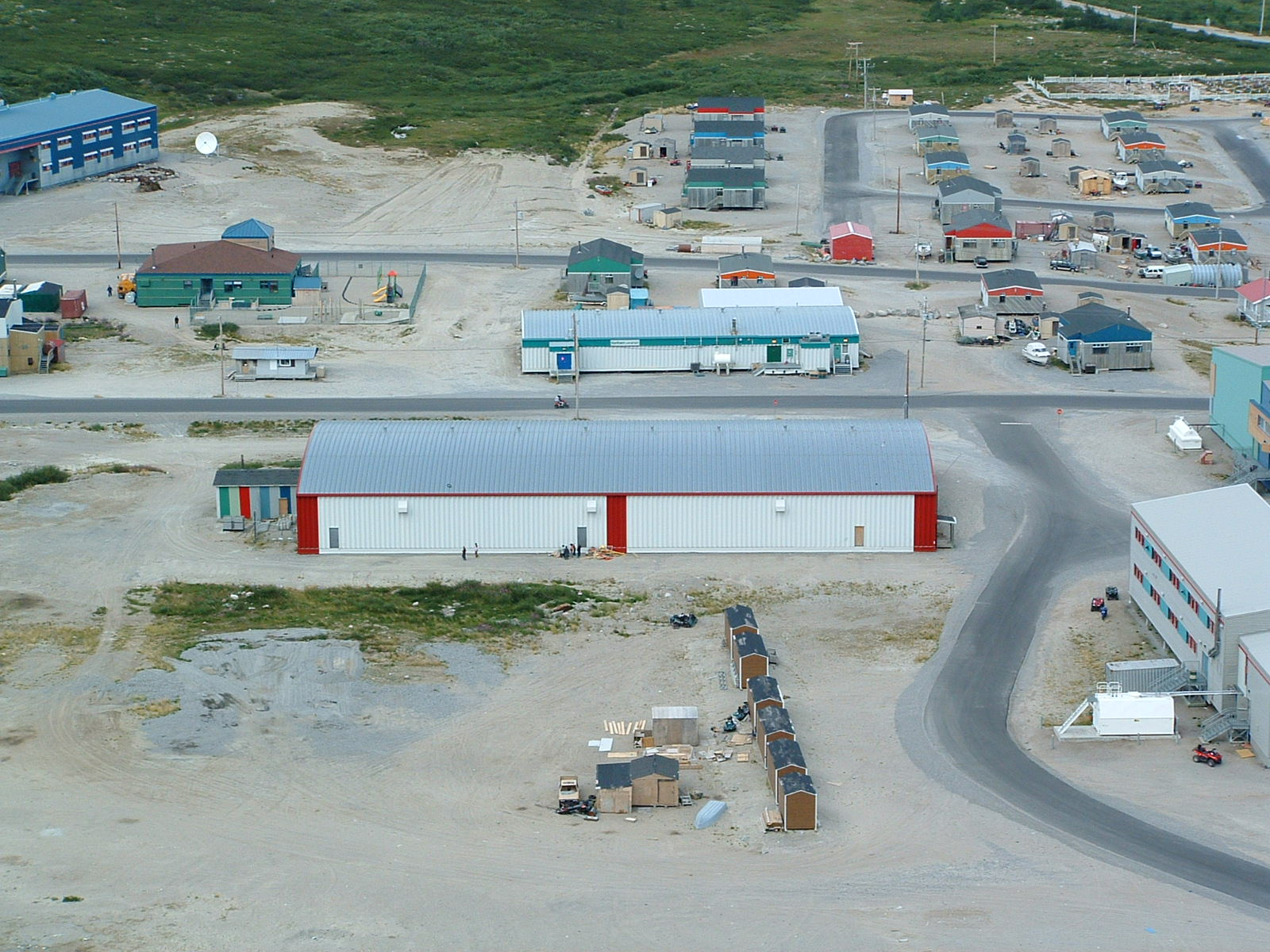
Kangiqsualujjuaq hockey rink
