= Torngarsoak Mountain =

Canadian mountain

Highest point
- Elevation: 1,595 m (5,233 ft)
- Prominence: 720 m (2,360 ft)
- Coordinates: 58°57′01″N 63°47′57″W

Geography
- Location: Labrador, Canada
- Parent range: Selamiut Range
- Topo map: NTS 14L13 Cirque Mountain

Torngarsoak Mountain is a mountain located 10 km (6 mi) east of Tallek Lake, Labrador, Canada. It is the second highest mountain in Labrador and lies in the Selamiut Range, which is a subrange of the Torngat Mountains.
