= Labrador Peninsula =

Peninsula in eastern Canada

Geography of Labrador Peninsula - Quebec-Labrador Peninsula
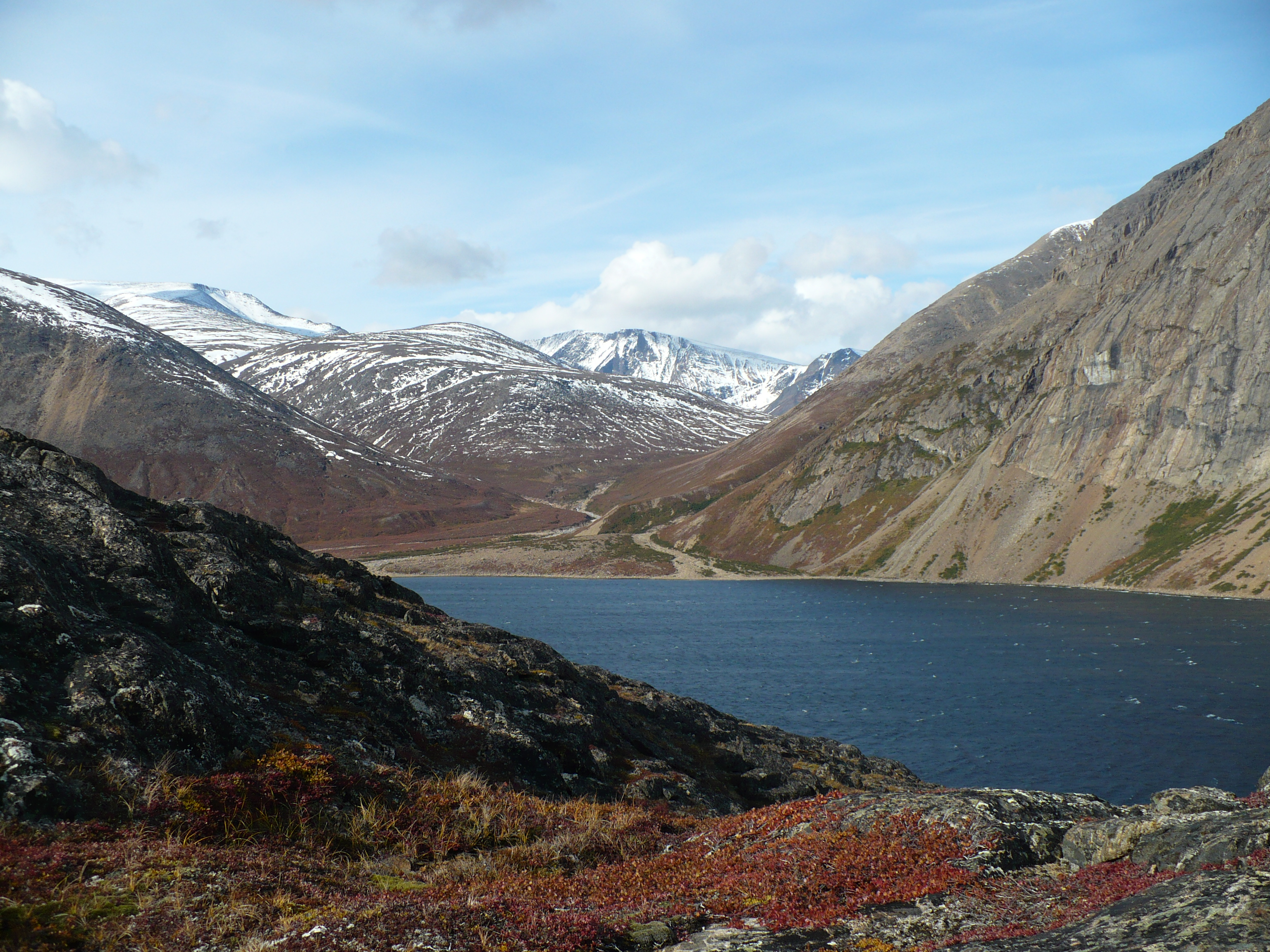
- Nachvak Fjord, Torngat Mountains National Park Reserve

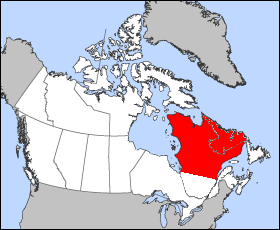
- Continent: North America
- Region: Eastern Canada
- Area
  - Total: 1,400,000 km^{2} (540,000 sq mi)
  - Land: 88%
  - Water: 12%
- Highest point: Mount Caubvick
- Lowest point: Sea level
- Longest river: La Grande River
- Largest lake: Caniapiscau Reservoir
- Climate: Largely subarctic
- Terrain: Flat and rolling except in the Torngat, Otish and Laurentian mountain ranges.

The Labrador Peninsula, also called Quebec-Labrador Peninsula, is a large peninsula in eastern Canada. It is bounded by Hudson Bay to the west, the Hudson Strait to the north, the Labrador Sea to the east, Strait of Belle Isle and the Gulf of St. Lawrence to the southeast. The peninsula includes the region of Labrador, which is part of the province of Newfoundland and Labrador, and the regions of Saguenay–Lac-Saint-Jean, Côte-Nord, and Nord-du-Québec, which are in the province of Quebec. It has an area of 1,400,000 km^{2} (541,000 sq mi).

== Location and geography ==
The peninsula is surrounded by sea on all sides, except for the southwest where it widens into the general continental mainland. The northwestern part of the Labrador Peninsula is shaped as a lesser peninsula, the Ungava Peninsula, surrounded by Hudson Bay, the Hudson Strait, and Ungava Bay. The northernmost point of the Ungava Peninsula, Cape Wolstenholme, also serves as the northernmost point of the Labrador Peninsula and of the province of Quebec. The peninsula is a plateau threaded by river valleys. There are several mountain ranges. The Torngat Mountains, located in the northern part of the peninsula, contain the highest point of the peninsula, Mount Caubvick, which at 1,652 metres (5,420 ft) is also the highest point of mainland Canada east of Alberta. The mountains also host Torngat Mountains National Park, the only national park of Canada in Labrador. The park is located in the province of Newfoundland and Labrador, and the adjacent Kuururjuaq National Park is located in the province of Quebec.

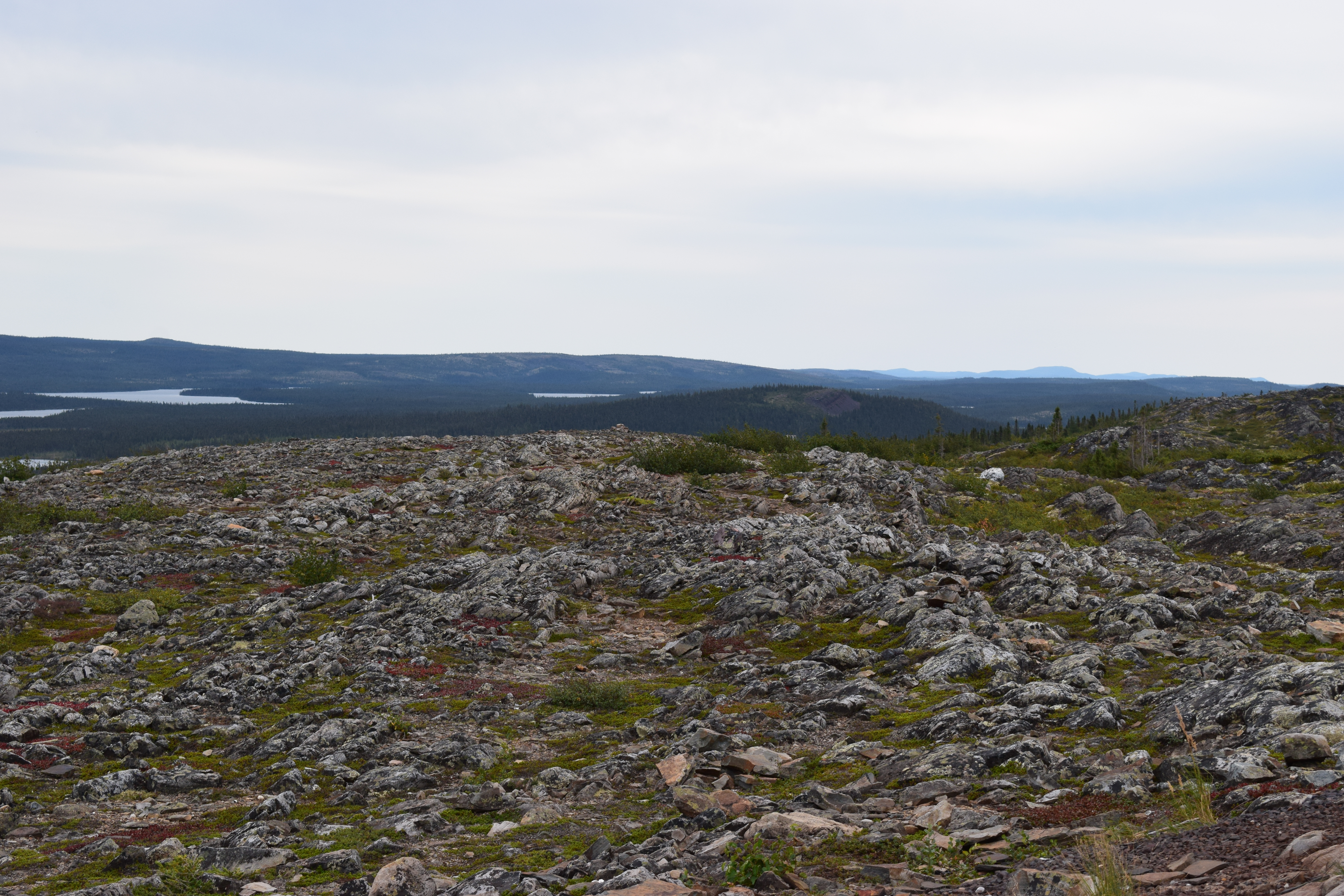
Typical landscape scenery of the interior of the Labrador Peninsula, taken near Schefferville, Quebec, in summer 2021

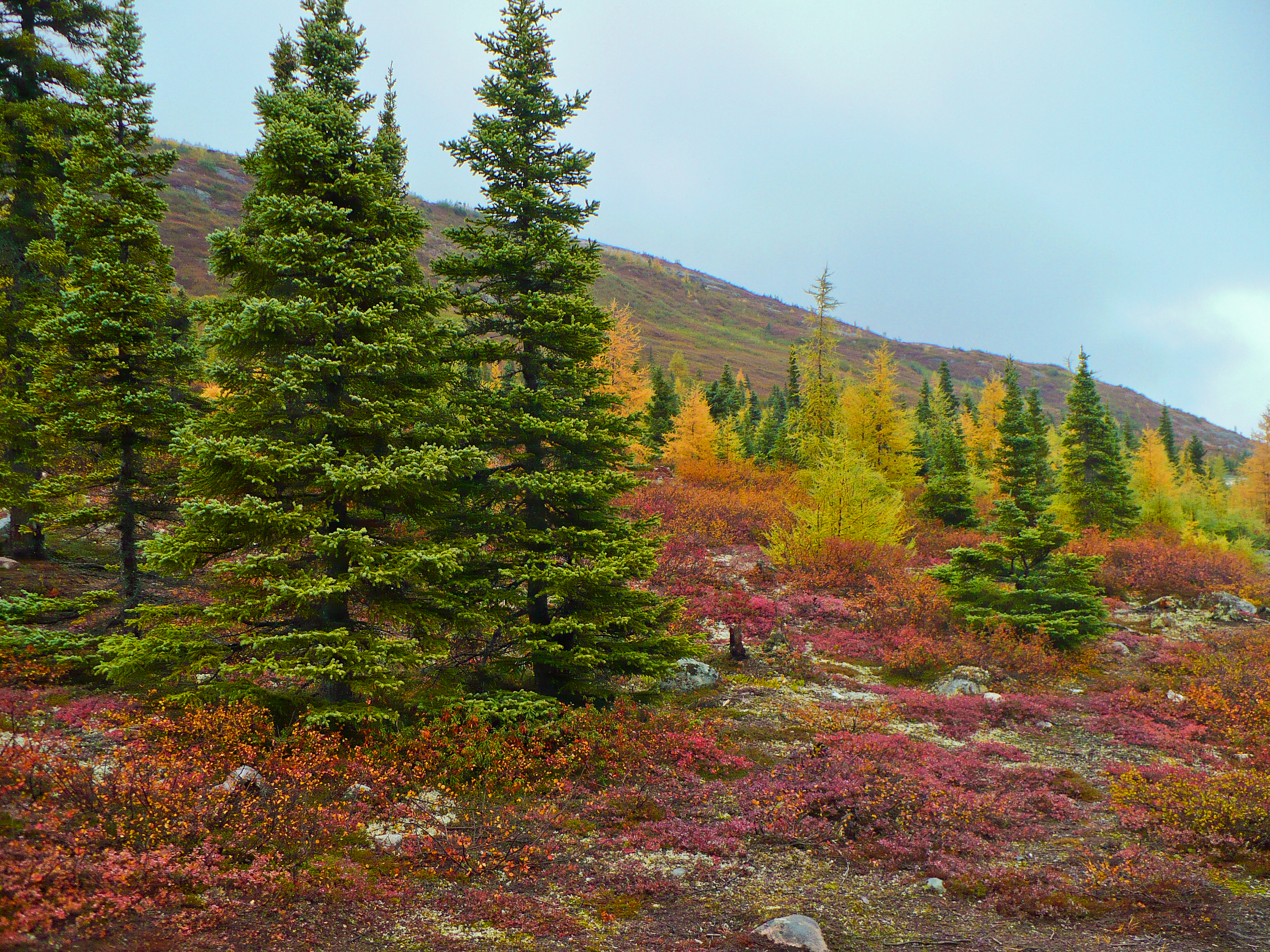
A hillside at Nain, east coast of the peninsula on a September 2008 autumn day

=== Hydrology ===
Due to it being covered almost entirely by the Canadian Shield—a vast, rocky plateau with a history of glaciation—the peninsula has a large number of lakes. The province of Quebec alone has more than half a million lakes of varying size. The largest body of water on the Labrador Peninsula is the Smallwood Reservoir, but the largest natural lake is Lake Mistassini. Other lakes of note include the Manicouagan Reservoir, the Caniapiscau Reservoir, and the La Grande 2 and La Grande 3 reservoirs. Due to a history of hydroelectric development, the majority of the larger freshwater lakes on the peninsula are reservoirs. In addition to an abundance of lakes, the peninsula also has many rivers. The longest, the La Grande River, is 900 kilometres (560 mi) long and flows westwards across nearly half the peninsula, emptying into James Bay. Other rivers of note include the Eastmain River, Rupert River, and Churchill River.

== History ==
Prior to European colonization, the peninsula was inhabited chiefly by Cree and Inuit peoples. The Innu Nation in the southeast area of the peninsula referred to as Nitassinan (ᓂᑕᔅᓯᓇᓐ, meaning "our land" in the Innu language) and the Naskapi whose territories just to the north called St'aschinuw (ᒋᑦ ᐊᔅᒋᓄᐤ, also meaning "our land") speak closely related languages; while the East Cree of Eeyou Istchee (ᐄᔨᔨᐤ/ᐄᔨᔫ/ᐄᓅ ᐊᔅᒌ) speak a more distantly related language. Inuit homelands are Nunavik (ᓄᓇᕕᒃ) in northern Quebec, Nunatsiavut (ᓄᓇᑦᓯᐊᕗᑦ) in northern Labrador and NunatuKavut (ᓄᓇᑐᑲᕗᑦ) in southern Labrador. The area became known as Markland in Greenlandic Norse and its inhabitants were known as the Skræling.

It is widely accepted that the peninsula is named after Portuguese explorer João Fernandes Lavrador. He was granted a patent by King Manuel I of Portugal in 1499 that gave him the right to explore that part of the Atlantic Ocean as set out in the Treaty of Tordesillas. Together with Pero de Barcelos, he first sighted Labrador in 1498, and charted the coasts of southwestern Greenland and of adjacent the northeastern North America around 1498 and gave notice of them in Portugal and Europe. His landowner status allowed him to use the title lavrador, Portuguese for "farmer" or "landholder", but "labrador" in Spanish and Galician means "agricultural worker" (Portuguese pronunciation: [lɐvɾɐˈðoɾ]). He actually gave the name of Terra do Lavrador to Greenland, which was the first land that he sighted, but eventually, the name was spread to all areas until it was set for Labrador.
