= Donat Savoie =

- Born: Montreal, Quebec, Canada
- Education: University of Montreal
- Occupation: Anthropologist
- Employer: Department of Indian and Northern Affairs Canada
- Known for: Interim Executive Director of Canada's Inuit Relations Secretariat; Chief federal negotiator for Nunavik self-government
- Awards: Weaver-Tremblay Award

Donat Savoie (born in Montreal, Quebec) is a Canadian anthropologist. He served as the interim Executive Director of Canada's Inuit Relations Secretariat and chief federal negotiator for Nunavik self-government before his retirement in 2006.

== Early life and education ==
"By allowing myself to be integrated into the family and village, I learnt a great deal about the Inuit way of life, their mode of thought, their values and the difficulties they faced daily in a quest for food and family essentials. This was an opportunity for me to witness not only their capacity to survive, but also their creative response to many obstacles." (Savoie, regarding his 1967 experience in George River.)

Savoie left on May 3, 1967 for the Eastern Arctic, to the Ungava Bay community of George River, now known as Kangiqsualujjuaq, Quebec. There he lived with Inuk printmaker Tivi Etok and family while doing research for his masters' project. He received a B.S. degree in Anthropology from the University of Montreal in 1968, and a master's degree in Anthropology the following year.

== Career ==
Savoie spent his career at the Department of Indian and Northern Affairs Canada (DIAND) where he held several positions. His first job, in 1969, was the analysis and editing of Father Émile Petitot’s ethnographic work in the Northwest Territories. From 1971-1974, he was a Research Officer in the Northern Research Division, before becoming Chief of the Eastern Arctic Section, Northern Research Division in 1975. For thirteen years, from 1977 through 1990, Savoie was Director of Circumpolar and Scientific Affairs. In 1992, Savoie became Acting Director General, Self-Government, and in 1993-2001, Senior Negotiator for Nunavik Self-Government negotiations. The Minister of DIAND appointed Savoie as Chief Federal Negotiator for Nunavik Self-Government negotiations in 2001, a position he held until 2006. In the last year before his retirement, he served as Interim Executive Director, Inuit Relations Secretariat, April 2005-April 2006, thus making him the first director of the federal government's new Inuit secretariat.

"The 36 years I have spent in the public service of Canada, and nearly exclusively with the Department of Indian and Northern Affairs Canada, have brought a lot of fun and many nice accomplishments." (Savoie, 2006)

In addition to being the Founding President of the University of Montreal Research Committee on Northern Populations in 1974, Savoie has held leadership positions in a variety of organizations, including Vice President, Canadian Association of French Language Sociologists and Anthropologists (1973); Secretary Treasurer and Vice-President, Recherches Améridiennes au Québec (1971–1975); Vice President, Man and the Biosphere/Canada Program, Unesco (1984–1987).

From 1977 through 1982, Savoie was also editor of Montreal's Cultures Amérindiennes Collection of Éditions Hurtubise HMH Ltée.

He retired from government service April 7, 2006.

The introduction and photographs in Jobie Weetaluktuk's 2008 book, Le monde de Tivi Etok: la vie et l'art d'un aîné inuit about the man Savoie lived with while doing his master's degree research, are by Savoie.

== Awards and honors ==
He was elected a Fellow of the Arctic Institute of North America in 1996, and ten years later, in 2006, was elected a member of the College of Fellows of the Royal Canadian Geographical Society. He was the 2003 recipient of the Weaver-Tremblay Award.

== Selected works ==
- (1970). Les Indiens loucheux, OCLC 179804781
- (1971). Le rapport Dorion et les droit territoriaux des Indiens de la baie de James, OCLC 24820948
- (1971). Les esquimaux Tchiglit, OCLC 180149784
