= Cirque Mountain =

Mountain in Labrador, Canada

Highest point
- Elevation: 1,568 m (5,144 ft)
- Prominence: 820 m (2,690 ft)
- Coordinates: 58°56′01″N 63°32′57″W

Geography
- Location: Labrador, Canada
- Parent range: Selamiut Range
- Topo map: NTS 14L13 Cirque Mountain

Climbing
- First ascent: 1916, A.P. Coleman

Cirque Mountain is a mountain located 11 km (7 mi) northeast of Mount Caubvick, in Labrador, Canada. It is the third-highest mountain in Labrador, after Caubvick (1,652 m) and Torngarsoak Mountain (1,595 m), and lies in the Selamiut Range, which is a subrange of the Torngat Mountains. Before 1971, it was believed that Cirque Mountain was the highest peak in Canada east of the Rocky Mountains and south of Baffin Island; that distinction is now known to belong to Mount Caubvick.
