= Kuururjuaq National Park =

National park of Quebec, Canada

- IUCN category II (national park)
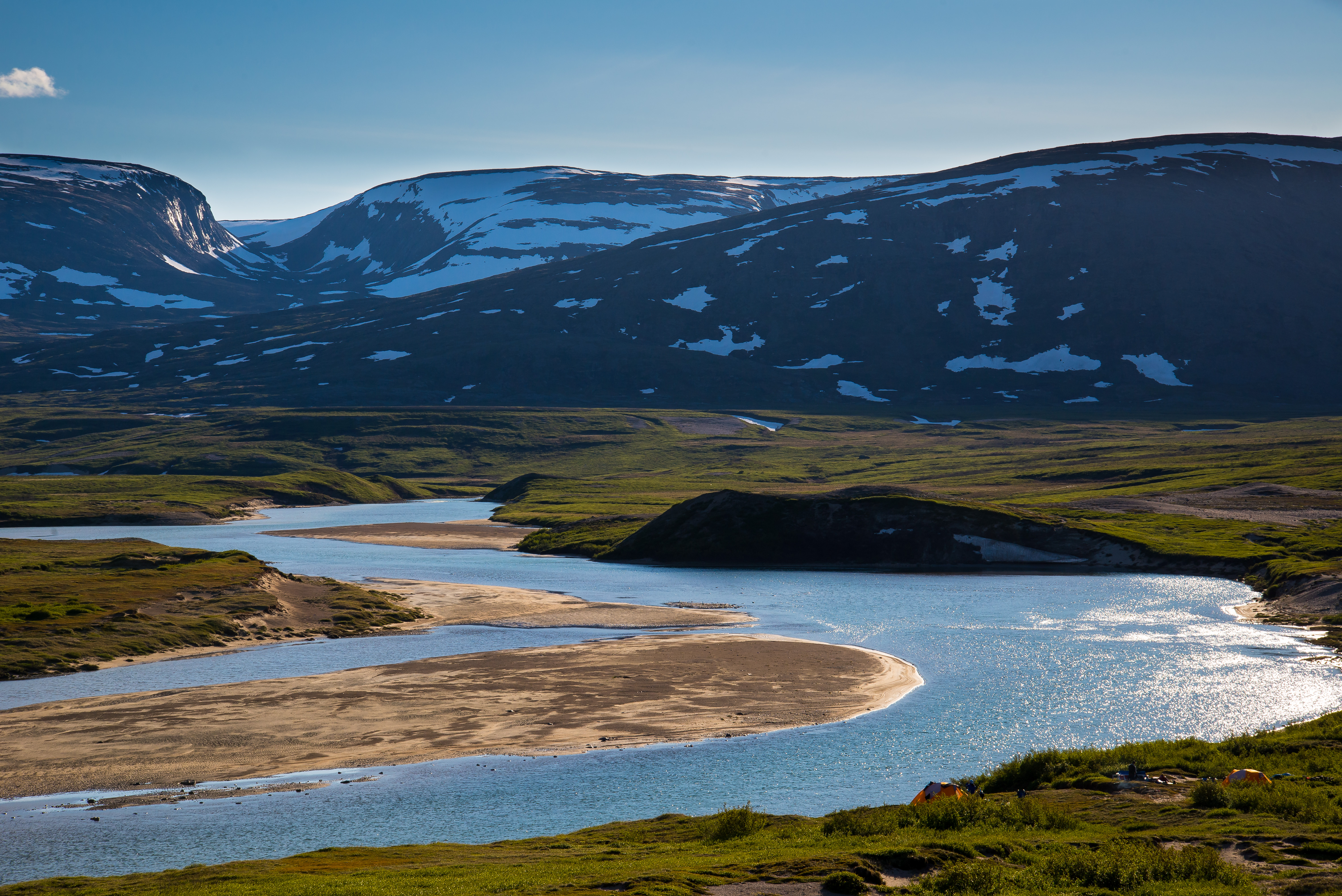

- Location within Quebec Location within Canada
- Interactive map of Kuururjuaq National Park
- Nearest city: Kangiqsualujjuaq
- Coordinates: 58°37′49.8″N 64°33′20.52″W
- Area: 4,460 km^{2} (1,720 sq mi)
- Established: May 2009
- Governing body: Kativik Regional Government

Kuururjuaq National Park (French: Parc national Kuururjuaq) is a 4,460 km^{2} national park, created in May 2009 and managed by the Kativik Regional Government, in northeast Quebec, Canada. It stretches all the way from Ungava Bay to Mount D'Iberville, which is on the Newfoundland and Labrador and Quebec border. Mount D'Iberville, at an altitude of 1,646 m (5,400 ft), is the highest mountain in eastern continental Canada, dominating over the entire Torngat Mountain range. The 166 km (103 mi) Koroc River runs through the national park to Ungava Bay. Kuururjuaq National Park contains a variety of different ecosystems and comprises three natural regions: the Torngat Mountain Foothills, the George River Plateau and the Ungava Coast. Like other Nunavik parks, Kuururjuaq National Park is developed and managed by the Inuit.

== Flora and fauna ==
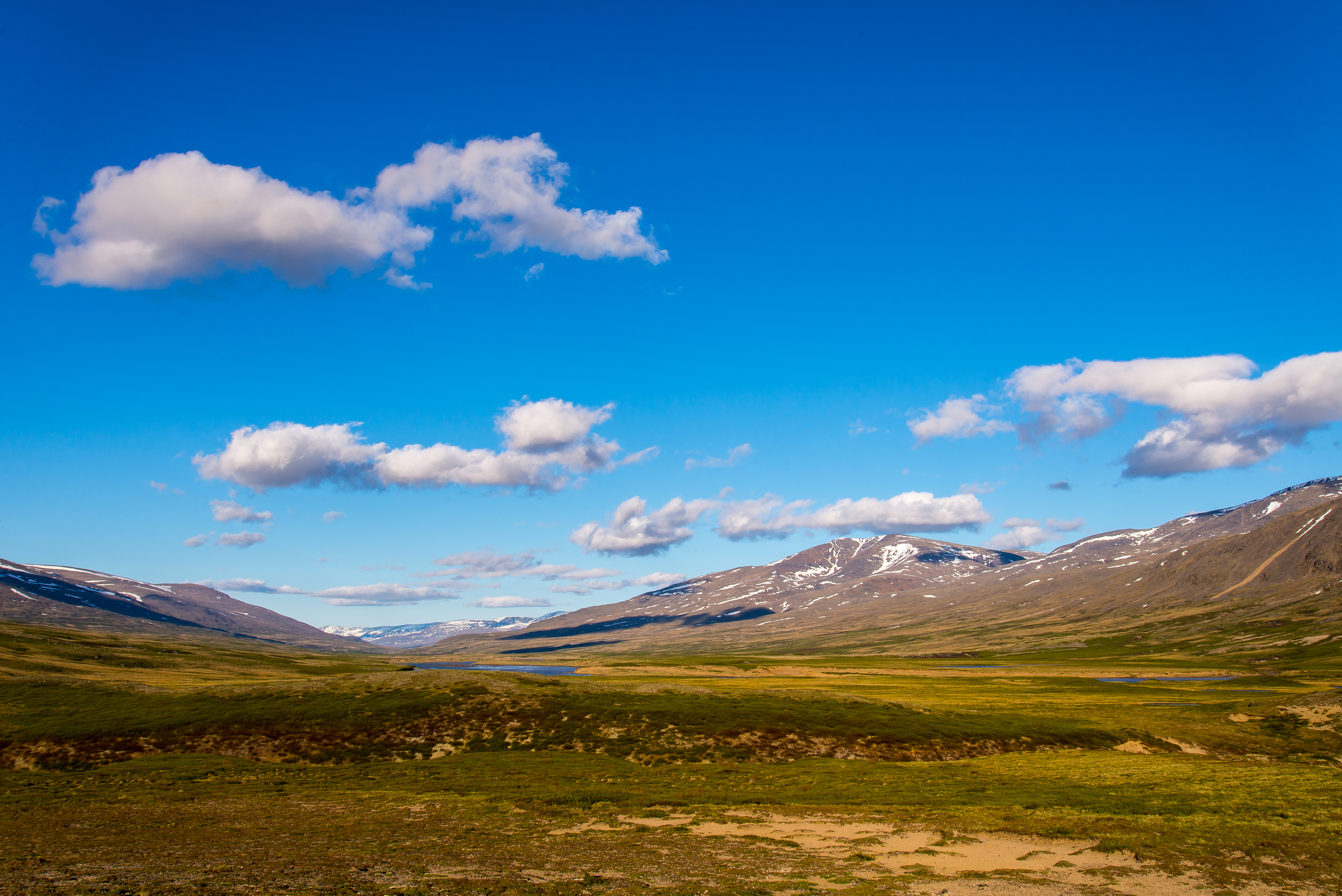
Korok River valley, Kuururjuaq National Park

The flora and fauna within the park are diverse, owing to its wide variety of habitats. There are 10 species of marine mammal, 24 species of land mammal and a similar number of fish, plus various forest birds. In the Koroc River, there are several species of marine animal, including the Arctic char, brook trout, whitefish and Atlantic salmon. Within the valley, there are red and Arctic foxes, spruce grouse, willow ptarmigan and black and polar bears. Caribou are the main attraction of the park. There are two herds: the George River herd and the Torngat Mountain herd.

There is also a relatively diverse variety of vegetation within the park, including the black spruce and tamarack.

== See also ==
- List of protected areas of Quebec
