= Torngat Mountains National Park =

National park in Newfoundland and Labrador, Canada

- Parc national des Monts-Torngat
- IUCN category II (national park)
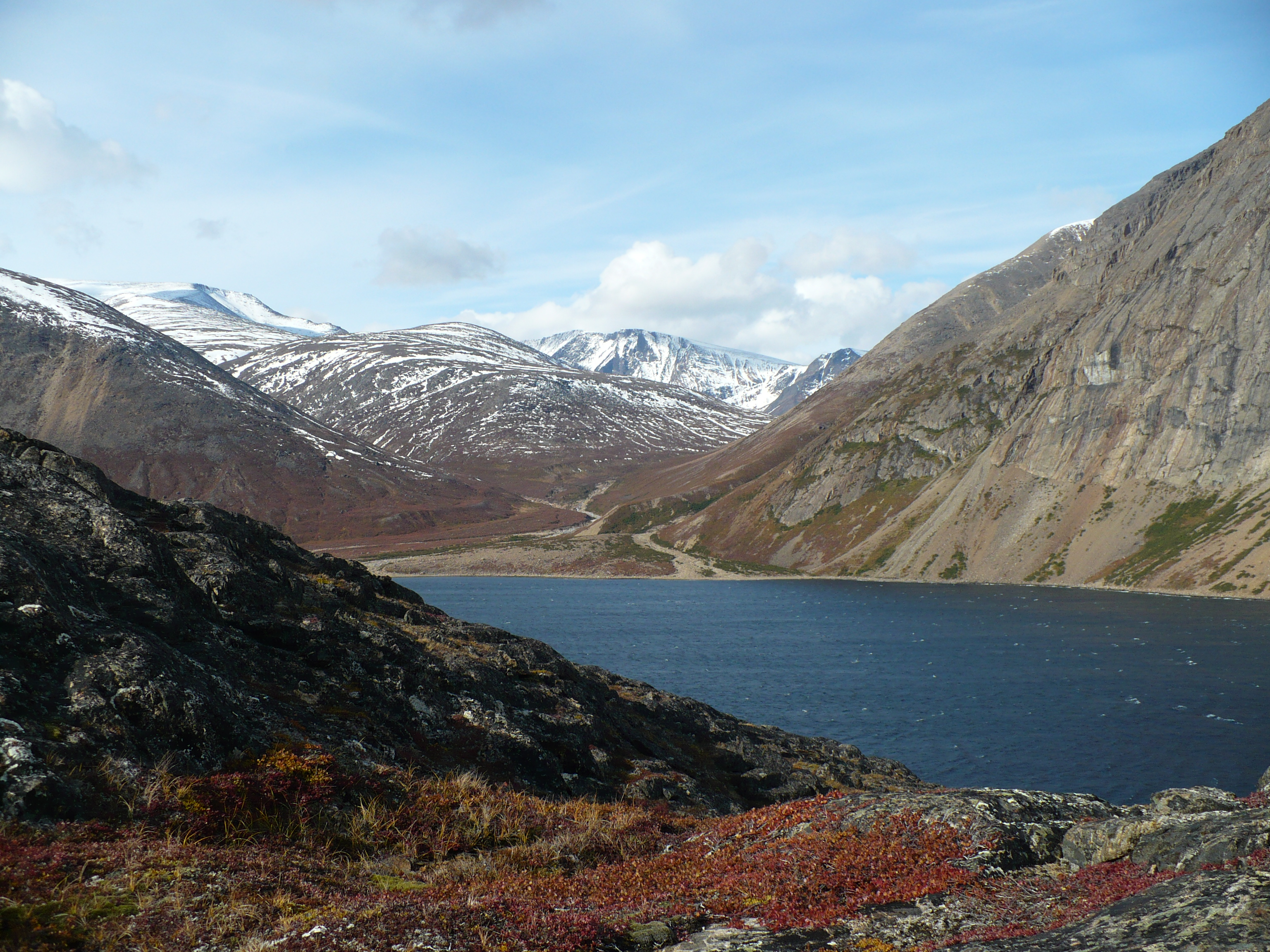
- Nachvak Fjord

- Location within Canada Location within Newfoundland and Labrador
- Interactive map of Torngat Mountains National Park
- Location: Labrador, Newfoundland and Labrador, Canada
- Nearest city: Nain
- Coordinates: 59°26′09″N 63°41′47″W
- Area: 9,700 km^{2} (3,700 sq mi)
- Established: July 10, 2008
- Governing body: Parks Canada

Torngat Mountains National Park (Inuktitut: Tongait KakKasuangita SilakKijapvinga) is a Canadian national park located on the Quebec-Labrador Peninsula in the province of Newfoundland and Labrador. The park encompasses 9,700 km^{2} (3,700 sq mi; 2,400,000 acres) of mountainous terrain between Northern Quebec and the Labrador Sea. It is the largest national park in Atlantic Canada and the southernmost national park in the Arctic Cordillera. It partially contains the Torngat Mountains, the highest mountains in mainland Canada east of the Rocky Mountains.

The Torngat Mountains National Park was created to honour the relationship that Inuit of Labrador and Nunavik have with the land. Parks Canada works with these groups in order to conserve the ecological integrity of the land, as well as to inform visitors of the park's history with Inuit groups. The subarctic mountains are part of the greater Inuit homeland, known as Inuit Nunangat. The area in and around the park is governed by Inuit and it has been named "Nunatsiavut", translating to "our beautiful land" in their native language. The mountains are an important place for Inuit and have been known as the "place of spirits".

An area called Torngat Mountains National Park Reserve was set aside with enactment of the Labrador Inuit Land Claims Agreement on December 1, 2005, with the intention of creating a national park. When the Nunavik Inuit Land Claims Agreement came into effect on July 10, 2008, the park was officially established, and the National Park Reserve became Torngat Mountains National Park, the first in Labrador.

In the Torngat Mountains, there are diverse animal and plant species in ecological communities. Indigenous cultures are deeply connected to and dependent on caribou for their food resources and cultures. This park protects wildlife including: boreal woodland caribou, black bears, Labrador wolf packs, red and Arctic foxes, polar bears, peregrine falcon, and golden eagle among others. Four different climatic regions enable these different species to co-exist. As the temperature rises, the ice in this area shrinks and shrubs grow rapidly, affecting local residents, species and tourists.

The park is open year-round and is accessible via charter air flight, cruise ship, or snowmobile. It offers wilderness-oriented recreational activities such as, hiking, scrambling, and kayaking.

== Creation of park ==
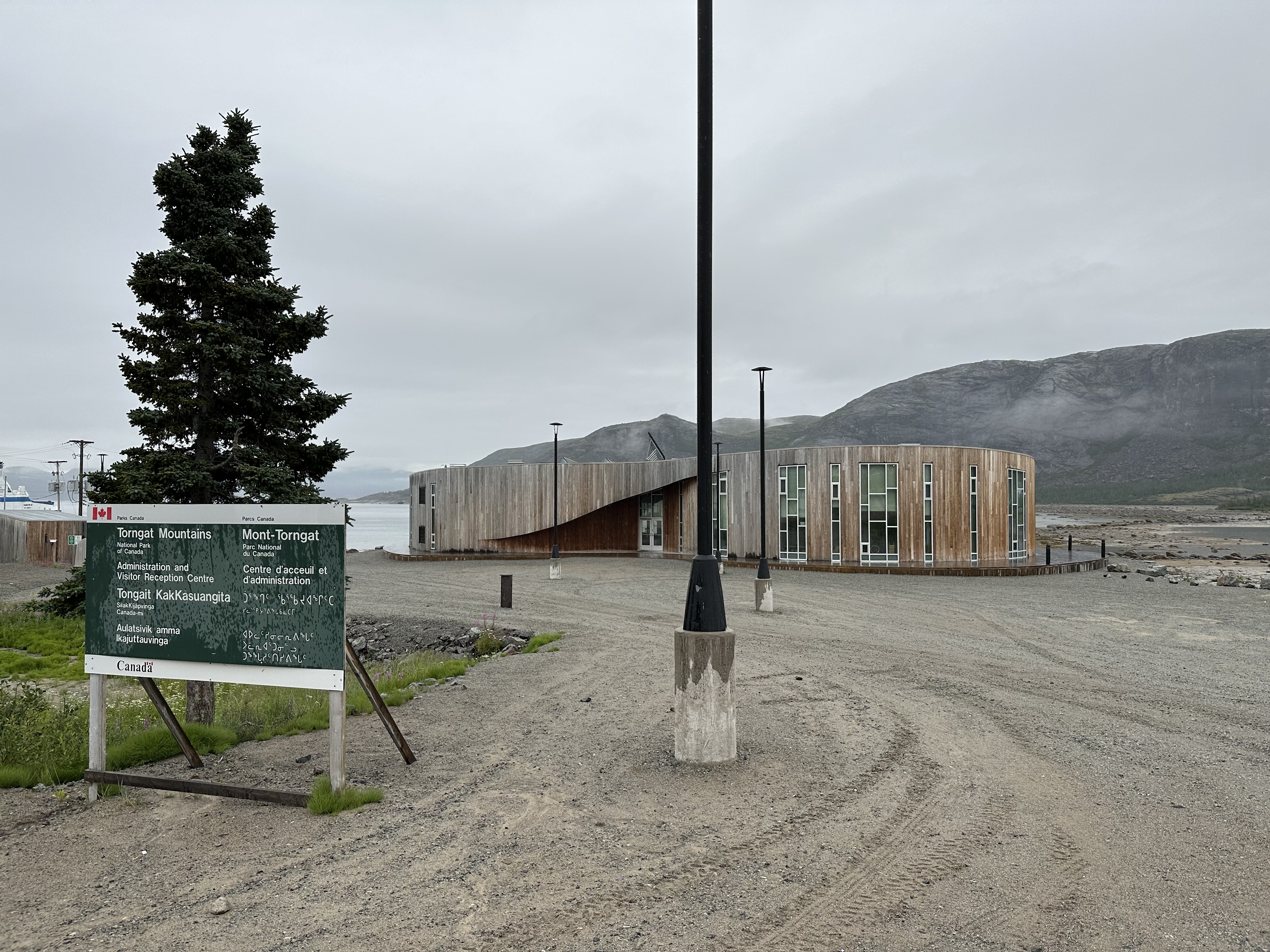
The Torngat Mountains National Park Administration and Visitor Reception Centre in Nain

During the 1970s, Parks Canada had a goal of creating national parks in 39 divided regions of the country, which were chosen based on vegetation and landscape. The Torngat Mountains were chosen to be conserved as part of this plan. Labrador and Nunavik Inuit also had interests in conserving the Torngat Mountains, as the land is embedded in their culture and history. The goal of collaborating with these Inuit groups was made to honour their rights, interests, and the relationship they have with the land. Being the tallest mountains in Canada, aside from the Rocky Mountains, the Torngat Mountains were a desired landscape to conserve. Usage of the park is meant for all Canadians to enjoy, with special interest being given to Nunavik and Labrador Inuit to use the designated land and its resources. These are some of the intended purposes for the park being built.

Some of the goals of the park include maintaining its ecological integrity, sharing the Inuit story, and attracting more visitors to support the park. The goal of ecological integrity has been maintained through recent designations addressing the concerns about the Torngat Mountains. These include the isolated and divided range that species could be found in and human disturbances of the area. To expand beyond hunting and fishing activities, the Nunavik Tourism Association was established, which helped with their business expansion goals and teaching of Inuit history. Some regional Inuit organizations were also created to address resource management, environmental protection, and economic development needs.

The boundaries of the park include the low watermark of the Labrador Sea to the east, Saglek Fiord to the south, the provincial boundary with Quebec to the west, and the tip of Newfoundland in the north. It does not include the Iron Strand, as it is owned by the Labrador Inuit. The park does not extend past Newfoundland's provincial bounds, which is how the borders to the west were chosen. It extends all the way to the eastern coastline of Newfound, where the Grenfell Sound, Eclipse Channel, and Bears Gut are located. There is no further information on how the southern border of the park was chosen.

== Inuit ==
Flag of Nunatsiavut

On December 1, 2005, the Inuit and the Canadian Government signed the "Labrador Inuit Land Claim Agreement" (LILCA). The agreement gave the power of 72,520 km^{2} (28,000 sq mi) of land, in Northern Labrador, over to Inuit to govern and they have named it "Nunatsiavut". Nunatsiavut translates to our beautiful land in Inuktitut, a common Inuit language.

The Torngat Mountains National Park is part of the Nunatsiavut region and is co-run by both the Canadian government and the Nunatsiavut government. This means that both powers must share the upkeep and management, as well as the resources it provides. Torngat Mountains was known as a park reserve since 2005, but became a national park on July 10, 2008, after the Land Claim Agreement came into legal effect. When the LILCA was signed, they also signed the Park Impacts and Benefits Agreement (PIBA). This agreement details the Inuit importance for the park's natural land and ecosystems and says that it will be honoured. The mountains are a spiritual place for Inuit and many would journey there seeking guidance from "spirit helpers". The name Torngat comes from the Inuktitut word Tongait, meaning "place of spirits".

== Fauna ==
Torngat mountains, home to the Nunatsiavut Inuit in Canada, are also lands and resources for diverse species. Caribou, polar bears and Arctic hares are some of the animals found in the area along with bird species and wolves. Caribou and wolves are in a prey-predator relationship and caribou depend on lichen in the winter. Parks Canada found some seals (i.e., ringed seals, hooded seals, harp seals, harbour seals, etc.) and whales swimming along the coast of the Torngat Mountains. Four different climatic regions (i.e., mountain alpine climate, coastal fjords and headlands climate, southern interior valleys climate, and Arctic flora) across the Torngat Mountains create ideal environments for various species to live.

Harlequin ducks, caribou, and peregrine falcons are identified as species at risk, found in the Torngat Mountains. Caribou are identified as species at risk, due to numerous human activities occurring in the Mountains. Over 38 years, the population trends of caribou in the Mountains are experiencing a decline, at the rate of 81 per cent. Some human activities driving caribou's population decline are mining, industrial development, overhunting, overharvesting, and climate change. Caribou show patterns of avoiding to reside in the proximity of mining areas up to 6 km (3.7 mi). Although mining scores negligible as a threat, caribou's safety is uncertain with the expected increase in mining and development activities. Building dams and implementing hydroelectricity projects cause a decline in caribou, causing a disturbance in their space and habitat use.

Historically, caribou have been cultural and traditional resources for groups of Indigenous people (i.e., the Cree, Inuit, Naskapi, etc.). Sport hunting in Quebec and Labrador, on the other hand, has been banned since 2012 in Quebec and 2013 in Labrador. However, the understanding of sport hunting is different in each region. Quebec considers hunting by non-Indigenous as sport hunting, whereas Labrador justifies hunting by non-Indigenous Labradoreans as subsistence hunting. Inuit elders and hunters, holding their traditional knowledge, believe their extent of hunting is negligible because they do not entail or act on overharvesting. Additionally, traditional knowledge holders share that caribou have been essential resources for cultures, functioning as sources of food and clothing. Fauna in the Torngat Mountains as well as the views from the Mountains are some of the aspects of attraction.

== Visitors and activities ==
The park welcomes fewer than 600 visitors a year. Visitors can visit the park by air, sea or on foot. Silluak, on the northern arm of the Saglek Fiord, adjacent to Saglek Bay, is a starting point for visitors. Hiking trails are mostly unmarked, and due to the prevalence of polar bears, working with armed local guides is recommended. Other activities in the park include animal watching, mountain climbing, backcountry camping, bird watching, kayaking, and photography.

== Impact of climate change ==
The climate of northern Nunatsiavut, Labrador, has been warming since the 1980s, and summer sea ice declines by 30 per cent each decade, snow days have also decreased across the region. Sea ice plays an integral role in regulating the climate, suppressing temperatures, and the dwindling amount of sea ice near coastlines has been linked to the frequent exposure of local residents to unprecedented heat in recent years.

It also has been shown to have an impact on tundra productivity. Regions throughout the Arctic will experience "shrubification" - shrubs will grow taller, bigger, and appear in previously unknown locations. According to forecasts, between 2039 and 2043, the bush-dominated habitat in Torngat Mountains National Park is expected to increase by about 50 per cent compared to 2014.

Shrubification can challenge the survival of local Inuit and wildlife. Excessive shrubs can have an impact on travel in summer and winter, making transportation tools like snowmobiles more dangerous. It also makes it more difficult to understand the location of black or polar bears, and not knowing their location effectively can make tourism dangerous and increase the chance of conflict between tourists and them. Shrubification has affected local food production and gathering, especially with reduced berry availability and productivity. It also harms lichen abundance and diversity, depriving the Torngat Mountain caribou population of an important food source.

== See also ==
- List of national parks of Canada
- List of Canadian protected areas
