= Selamiut Range =

Mountain range in Labrador, Canada

- Location within Newfoundland and Labrador

Highest point
- Peak: Mount Caubvick
- Elevation: 1,652 m (5,420 ft)
- Coordinates: 58°53′N 63°43′W

Geography
- Country: Canada
- Province: Labrador
- Range coordinates: 58°53′01″N 63°44′57″W
- Parent range: Torngat Mountains
- Topo map: NTS 14L13 Cirque Mountain

The Selamiut Range is a mountain range on the northernmost tip of Labrador, Canada. It is a subrange of the Torngat Mountains which in turn form part of the southern section of the Arctic Cordillera mountain system.

== See also ==
- List of mountain ranges
