= Nachvak Fiord =

Fiord in Labrador, Canada

Coordinates: 59°02′09″N 63°44′52″W

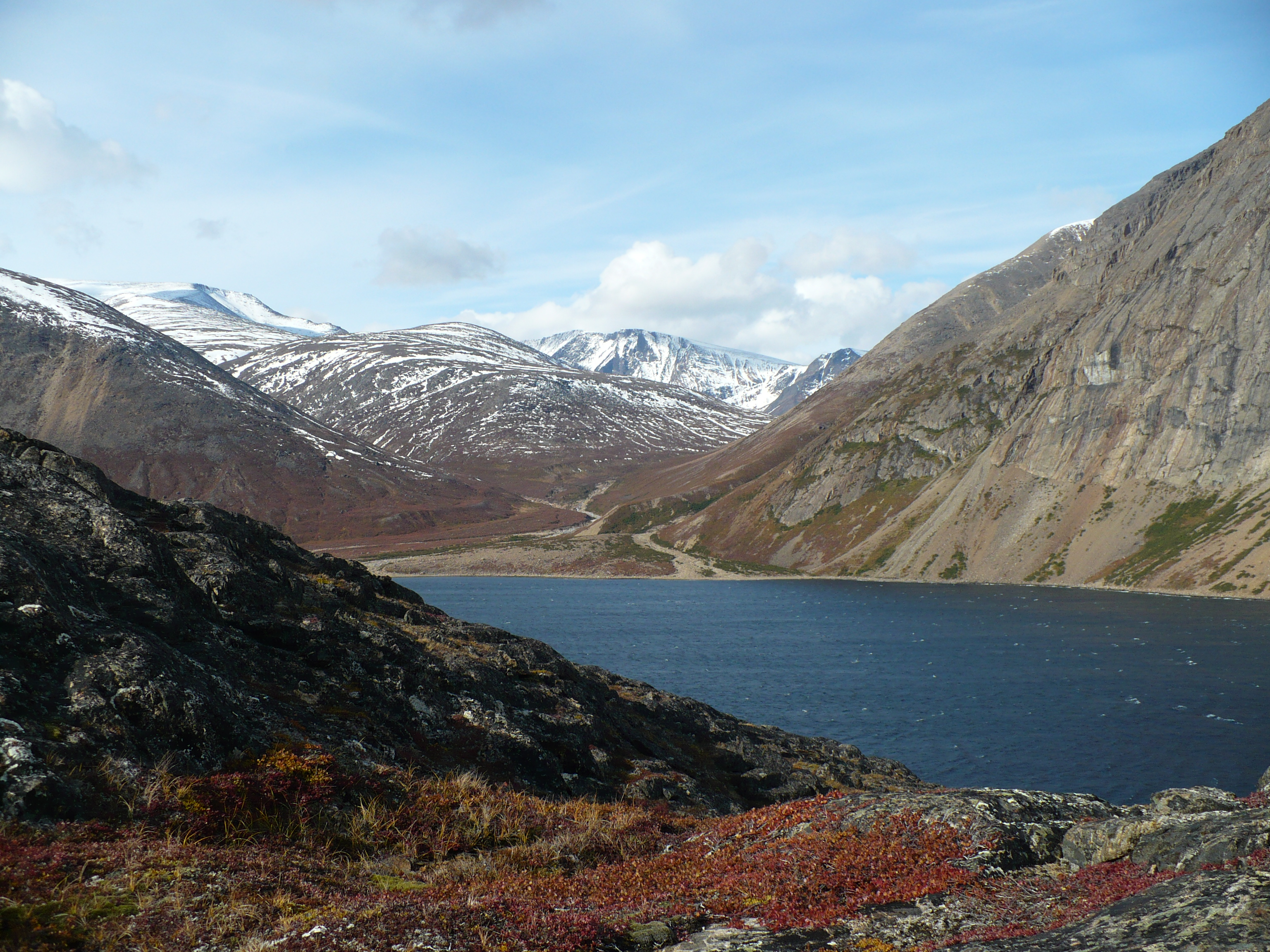
Nachvak Fjord, 2008

Nachvak Fjord is a deep fiord in northern Labrador nearly 2 km (1.2 mi) wide and 20 km (12 mi) long. The fjord is divided in two arms on the western end called Tallek Arm and Tasiuyak Arm. The Torngat Mountains that surround Nachvak Fjord are the highest in Labrador, where both Mount Razorback to the north and Mount Caubvick to the south are located.

The Inuit of Labrador have historically used this place as a summer fishing station. It was the site of a Hudson's Bay Company post from 1868 to 1905, the most northerly of the company's posts in Labrador. Governor William MacGregor estimated during his trip to northern Labrador in 1905 that there were 20 to 30 heathen, non-Moravian Inuit, in addition to Hudson's Bay Company personnel. In 1904 the Moravians induced several families to move to Killiniq where a mission station was established. In 1908 MacGregor had noted that the Moravians hoped to induce the remaining Inuit to move to Hebron.

== Tributaries ==
Many small rivers and canoeing routes empty into the fjord.

The Palmer River, flows northeasterly through the Torngat Mountains and empties into Tallek Arm.
