= Mount Caubvick =

Mountain in Quebec and Labrador, Canada

- Mont D'Iberville
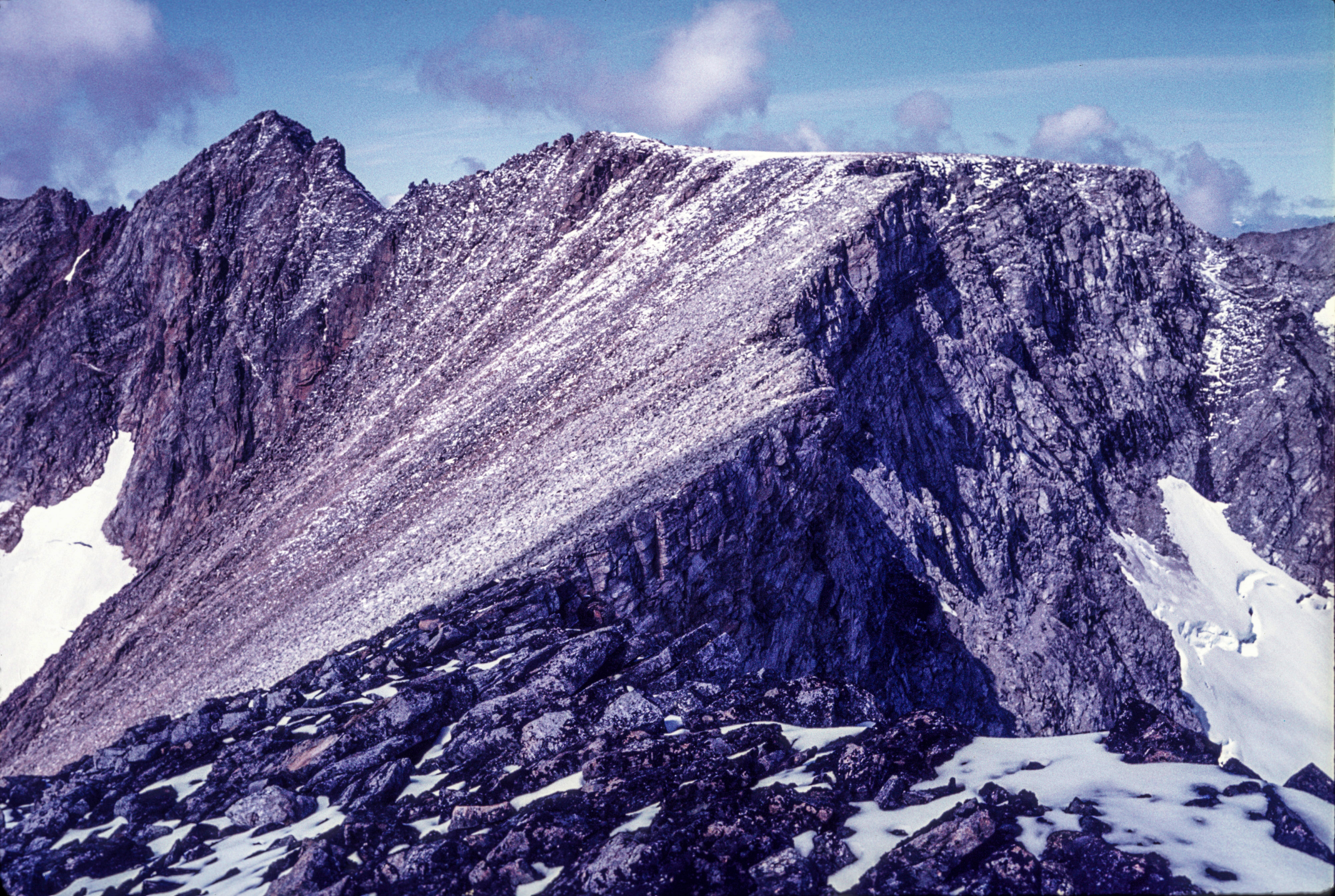

Highest point
- Elevation: 1,652 m (5,420 ft)
- Prominence: 1,367 m (4,485 ft)
- Isolation: 791 km (492 mi)
- Listing: North America isolated peaks 12th; Canada most isolated peaks 2nd; Canadian Subnational High Points 6th
- Coordinates: 58°53′01″N 63°42′57″W

Geography
- Location within Newfoundland and Labrador Location within Quebec
- Location: Border of Labrador and Quebec, Canada. Summit is in Labrador.
- Parent range: Torngats - Selamiut Range
- Topo map: NTS 14L13 Cirque Mountain

Climbing
- First ascent: 1973 by Goetze and Adler
- Easiest route: class 4 scramble

Mount Caubvick (1646 m, known as Mont D'Iberville in Quebec) is a mountain located in Canada on the border between Labrador and Quebec in the Selamiut Range of the Torngat Mountains. It is the highest point in Quebec, Newfoundland and Labrador, and mainland Canada east of the Rockies. The mountain contains a massive peak that rises sharply from nearby sea level. Craggy ridges, steep cirques and glaciers are prominent features of the peak.

The alp was named Mont D'Iberville by the Quebec government in 1971. It remained nameless on the Labrador side for several years; it became known unofficially as L1, L for Labrador and 1 for highest. In 1981, at the suggestion of Dr. Peter Neary, the provincial government named the mountain after Caubvick, one of the five Inuit who accompanied George Cartwright to England in 1772.

Mount Caubvick also hosts the highest point in both the province of Newfoundland and Labrador and Quebec, although the summit itself lies about 10 metres (33 ft) northeast of the Quebec provincial border and is entirely within Labrador.

== Climbing ==
Due to difficult access (either via bush plane or boat) and unpredictable, snowy weather at any time of the year, there is no easy way to the top. The summit can be gained from the east by the Minaret Ridge or to the west by the Koroc Ridge. The final sections on both routes become technical in nature.

American climbers Michael Adler and Christopher Goetze were the first to scale the peak in 1973. The first Canadian party climbed the mountain on August 14, 1978. In that party were Ray Chipeniuk, Ron Parker, and Erik Sheer.

In August 2003, two climbers from Mississauga, Ontario perished during their descent from the summit. A search was initiated in late August when they failed to meet a plane at a pre-arranged location. The approaching winter weather forced an early end to the search in 2003. In August 2004, their bodies were discovered high up on the mountain. The most plausible scenario appears to be that one of the climbers became injured and was unable to continue the descent. The other climber made an attempt to seek help, taking an alternate route down and apparently fell about 150 feet down a steep headwall.

== See also ==
- List of highest points of Canadian provinces and territories
- List of mountains of Quebec
- List of mountain peaks of North America
- Mountain peaks of Canada
