= Torngat Mountains =

Mountain range in eastern Canada

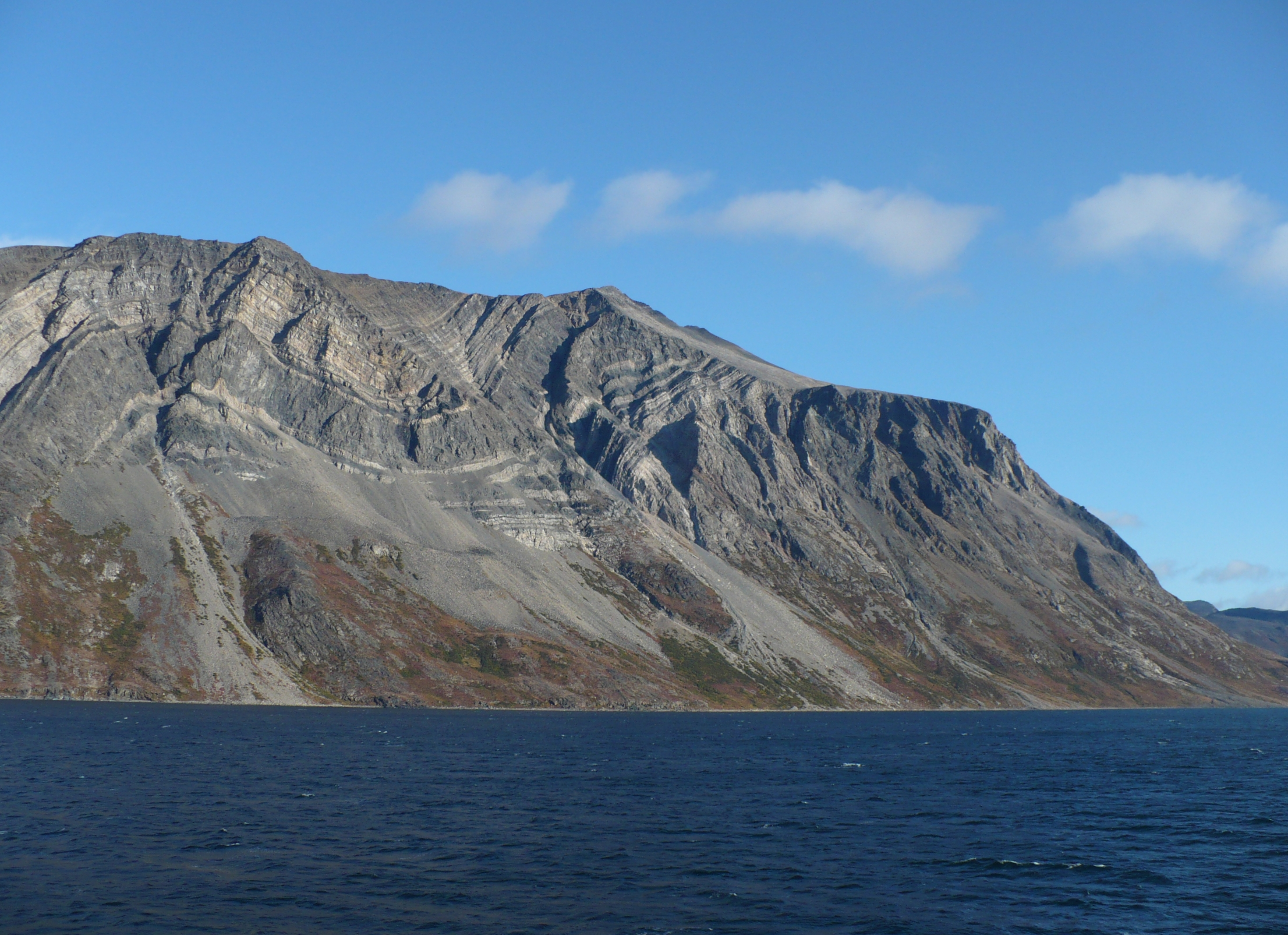
- Folded rocks of the Torngat Mountains

Highest point
- Peak: Mount Caubvick (Mont D'Iberville)
- Elevation: 1,652 m (5,420 ft)
- Coordinates: 58°53′01″N 63°42′57″W

Dimensions
- Area: 30,067 km^{2} (11,609 mi^{2})

Geography
- Location within Newfoundland and Labrador Location within Quebec
- Country: Canada
- Provinces: Labrador; Quebec
- Range coordinates: 59°25′N 64°30′W
- Parent range: Arctic Cordillera

The Torngat Mountains are a mountain range on the Labrador Peninsula at the northern tip of Newfoundland and Labrador and eastern Quebec. They are part of the Arctic Cordillera. The mountains form a peninsula that separates Ungava Bay from the Atlantic Ocean.

== Etymology ==
The name Torngat is derived from an Inuktitut word meaning place of spirits, sometimes interpreted as place of evil spirits.

== Geography ==
The Torngat Mountains have a substantial geographical extent. About 56% of the range is located in Quebec, 44% is in Labrador, and the remainder, less than 1%, is located on Killiniq Island in Nunavut. At least 2% of the mountain chain is under water, and poorly surveyed. The Torngat Mountains cover 30,067 square kilometres (11,609 sq mi), including lowland areas and extend over 300 km (186 mi) from Cape Chidley in the north to Hebron Fjord in the south. The Torngat Mountains have the highest peaks of eastern continental Canada.

The highest point is Mount Caubvick (also known as Mont D'Iberville) at 1,652 m (5,420 ft). There are no trees in the Torngat Mountains because the mountains lie in an arctic tundra climate and are therefore above the tree line.

Permafrost is continuous on the Quebec side of the border, and it is extensive but discontinuous on the eastern Atlantic side. The terrain is over 300 m (984 ft) above sea level and is predominantly rocky desert.

Highest Peaks of the Torngat Mountains
Rank	Name	m	ft
1	Mount Caubvick	1652	5420
2	Torngarsoak Mountain	1595	5232
3	Cirque Mountain	1568	5144
4	Peak 5100 (24I/16)	1554+	5100+
5	Peak 5074	1547	5074
6	Mount Erhart	1539	5049
7	Jens Haven	1531	5023
8	Peak 5000 (24P/01)	1524+	5000+
9	Peak 5000 (24I/16)	1524+	5000+
10	Innuit Mountain	1509	4951

== Geology ==
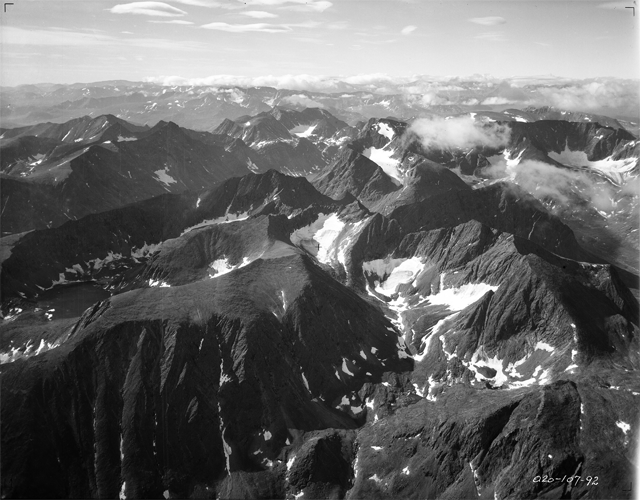
Aerial view of Four Peaks region of Torngat Mountains

Precambrian gneisses that comprise the Torngat Mountains are among the oldest on Earth and have been dated at roughly 3.6 to 3.9 billion years old. Geologists recognize the gneisses of the Torngats as a part of the Canadian Shield or Laurentian Upland, which, composing the very old North American Craton, split from the continent of Rodinia roughly 750 million years ago to form the geologic core of North America.

However, the mountain-building or orogeny of the Torngats took place much more recently, and is characteristic of the folding and faulting that defines the series of geological events known as Arctic Cordillera. This, according to some, makes the Torngats, as mountains, "distinct compared to the surrounding Precambrian Canadian Shield," though they are ultimately composed of shield rock. Evidence of this dramatic cordilleran folding and faulting characterizing the Torngat Mountains can be seen distinctly in rocks where the North American Craton long ago collided with the Nain Craton, later exposed in cross-section by glacial scouring, especially at Saglek Fjord.

== Glaciation ==
The ranges of the Torngat Mountains are separated by deep fjords and finger lakes surrounded by sheer rock walls. The fjords were produced by glaciation. The Laurentide Ice Sheet covered most of the mountains at least once, however during the last ice age the coverage was more limited.

Currently, there are over 100 active small mountain glaciers in the Torngat Mountains with a total of about 195 ice masses in the region.

== Ecology ==
Torngat Mountain tundra
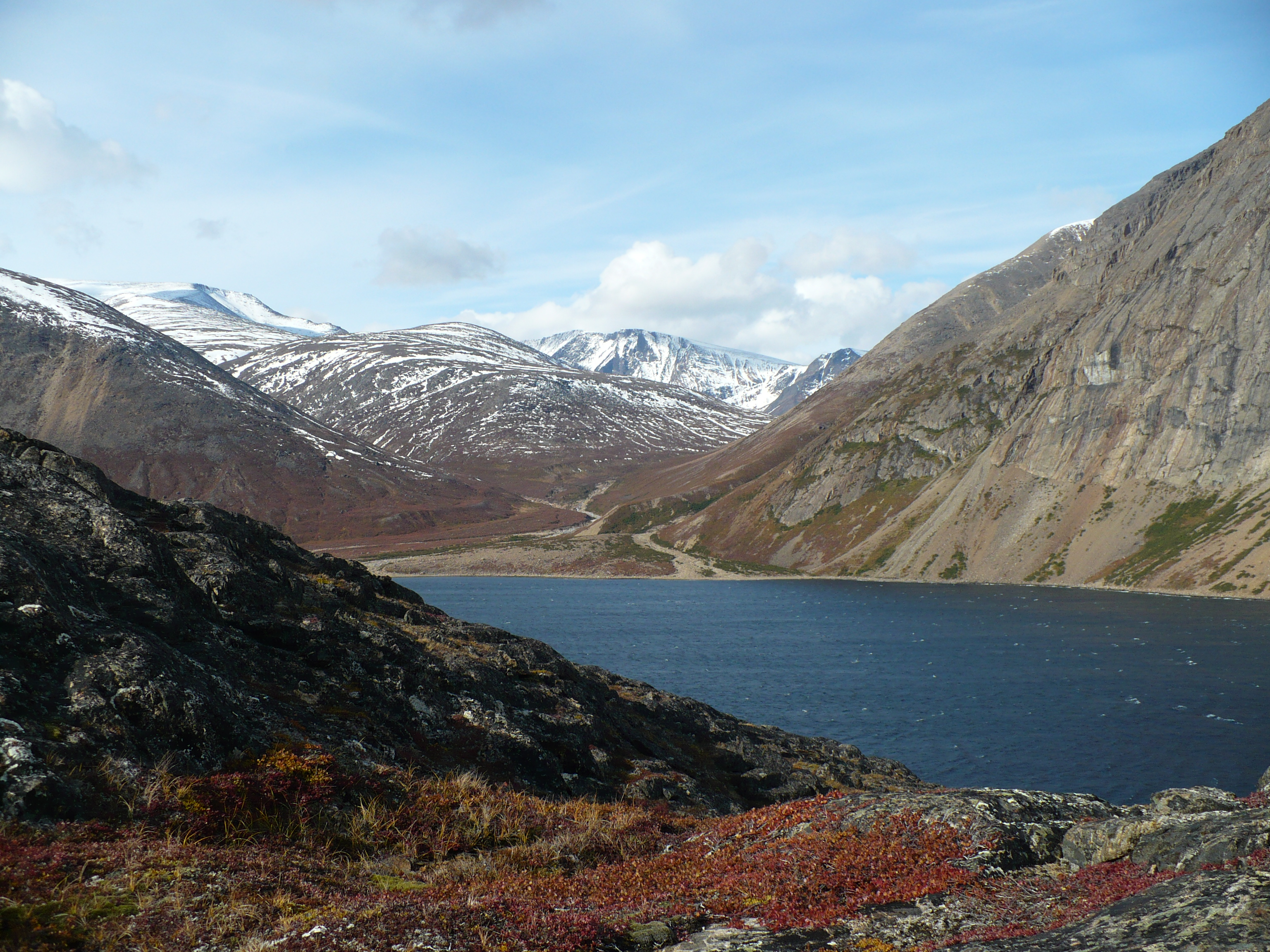
- Torngat Mountains and Nachvak Fjord

- Location of the Torngat Mountain tundra ecoregion in North America

Ecology
- Realm: Nearctic
- Biome: Tundra
- Borders: Eastern Canadian Shield taiga; Middle Arctic tundra

Geography
- Area: 32,375 km^{2} (12,500 mi^{2})
- Country: Canada
- Provinces: Newfoundland and Labrador; Quebec
- Climate type: Polar

Conservation
- Conservation status: Relatively Stable/Intact

=== Flora ===
The Torngat Mountain tundra is characterized by sparse cover of arctic sedges, grass, lichen, and moss. Patches of mixed arctic evergreen and deciduous shrubs can be found on sheltered south-facing slopes, increasing in prevalence as one moves south.

=== Fauna ===
The tundra provides seasonal habitat for caribou, polar bears, and the only tundra-dwelling black bears in the world. In addition, the coastal area of this ecoregion lies along the Atlantic migratory flyway.

== Conservation ==
The Torngat Mountains National Park Reserve was announced on 1 December 2005. It aims to protect wildlife (caribou, polar bears, peregrine falcon and golden eagle among others), while offering wilderness-oriented recreational activities.

== In popular culture ==
In the CBC Series Geologic Journey, the Torngat mountains are featured. Notably, a billion-year-old coal seam (based on algae, not peat swamps) was discovered in the Torngat mountains on the Newfoundland Coast as part of the filming of the series.

Backcountry Magazine ran a feature story written by Drew Pogge in 2009 on steep skiing in the Torngat Mountains, notably first descents in Nachvak and Saglek fjords, as well as on the Caubvick massif.

== See also ==
- List of ecoregions in Canada (WWF)
- Torngat Mountains National Park
- Kuururjuaq National Park
