= Central U.S. hardwood forests =

Temperate broadleaf and mixed forests ecoregion of the United States

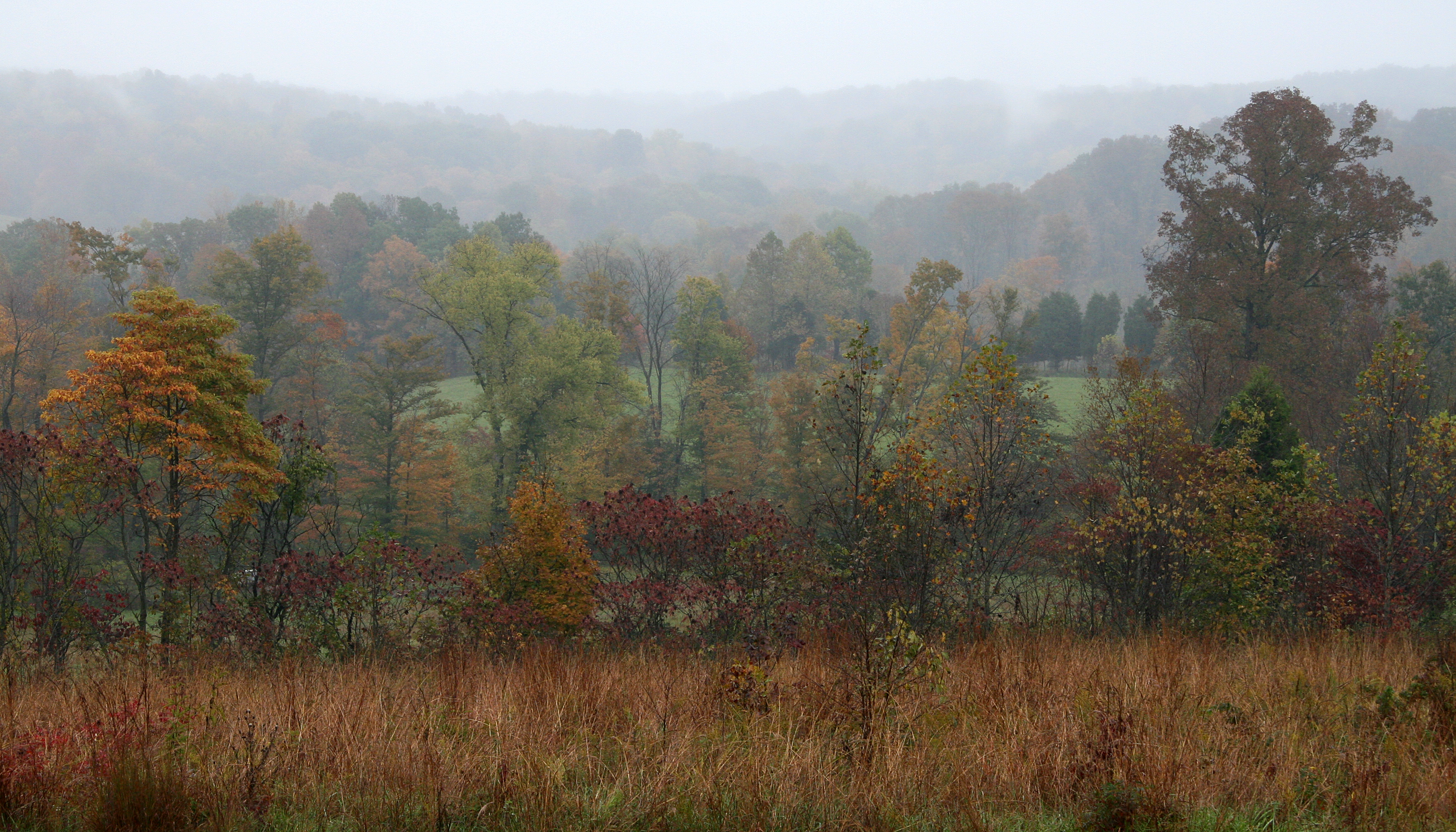
- Hoosier National Forest

Ecology
- Realm: Nearctic
- Biome: Temperate broadleaf and mixed forests
- Borders: List: Central forest-grasslands transition; Southern Great Lakes forests; Appalachian mixed mesophytic forests; Southeastern mixed forests; Mississippi lowland forests; Ozark Mountain forests
- Bird species: 203
- Mammal species: 69

Geography
- Area: 296,000 km^{2} (114,000 sq mi)
- Country: United States
- States: List: Missouri; Illinois; Indiana; Ohio; Kentucky; Tennessee; Mississippi; Alabama; Arkansas; Oklahoma
- Climate type: Humid continental (Dfa) and humid subtropical (Cfa)

Conservation
- Habitat loss: 46.522%
- Protected: 7.01%

The central U.S. hardwood forests comprise a temperate broadleaf and mixed forests ecoregion in the Eastern United States, as defined by the World Wildlife Fund. It has one of the most diverse herbaceous plant floras of ecoregions in North America.

== Setting ==
This is a large region, mainly of rolling plain except for the Ozark plateau and other smaller areas of plateau and basin in Kentucky and Tennessee. The region contains the large system of sandstone caves in Mammoth Cave National Park. The region was designated by the World Wide Fund for Nature (WWF) and is a fraction of what others consider the Central Hardwood Forest of the Central Hardwood Region, which would include the northern hardwood forest to the north.

== Flora ==
The pre-Columbian dominant ecosystems in this region were oak savannas with woodlands and forests of oak and hickory. Today only small areas of oak and hickory woodland remain, mixed with dogwoods, sassafras trees and hop hornbeams. The ecoregion contains large areas of prairie as well as wetter meadows that are home to tulip trees and sweetgums.

== Fauna ==
Birds of the woodlands include vireos and tanagers while mammals include bobcats, white-tailed deer, Eastern gray squirrels, chipmunks, raccoons and opossums.

== Threats ==
The dominance of oak in this part of the pre-Columbian savannas of North America was due to frequent fires. The fire suppression policies since the 1930s have been a significant forest disturbance.

Today there is very little intact habitat in this ecoregion, with a reduction of bottomland hardwood forests by 70–95%, and only 0.02 percent of the original oak savannas remain. Although much of the area is forested, these forests tend to be highly fragmented and significantly altered by development, agriculture, and fire suppression. The forests are dominated primarily by oak and hickory species, but succession has filled the understory with maples and yellow poplar and blocking oak regeneration. In some areas, habitat is threatened by urbanization and invasive species such as non-native privet, honeysuckle, garlic mustard and kudzu. Significant natural areas in the ecoregion include: Wolf River (Tennessee), the Cedar glades and the western Highland Rim of Tennessee; Mammoth Cave National Park; the Land Between the Lakes National Recreation Area of Tennessee and Kentucky; Hoosier National Forest and Yellowwood State Forest in southern Indiana; the Edge of Appalachia Preserve in Ohio; the Cache River (Illinois) wetlands and the Shawnee Hills in southern Illinois; and the Ozarks in Missouri including Mark Twain National Forest. The best preserved of these are Mammoth Cave, Edge of Appalachia, and parts of the Missouri Ozarks and the Tennessee Cedar Glades.

== See also ==
- List of ecoregions in the United States (WWF)
- Interior Low Plateaus
