= Beringia upland tundra =

Tundra ecoregion of Alaska, United States

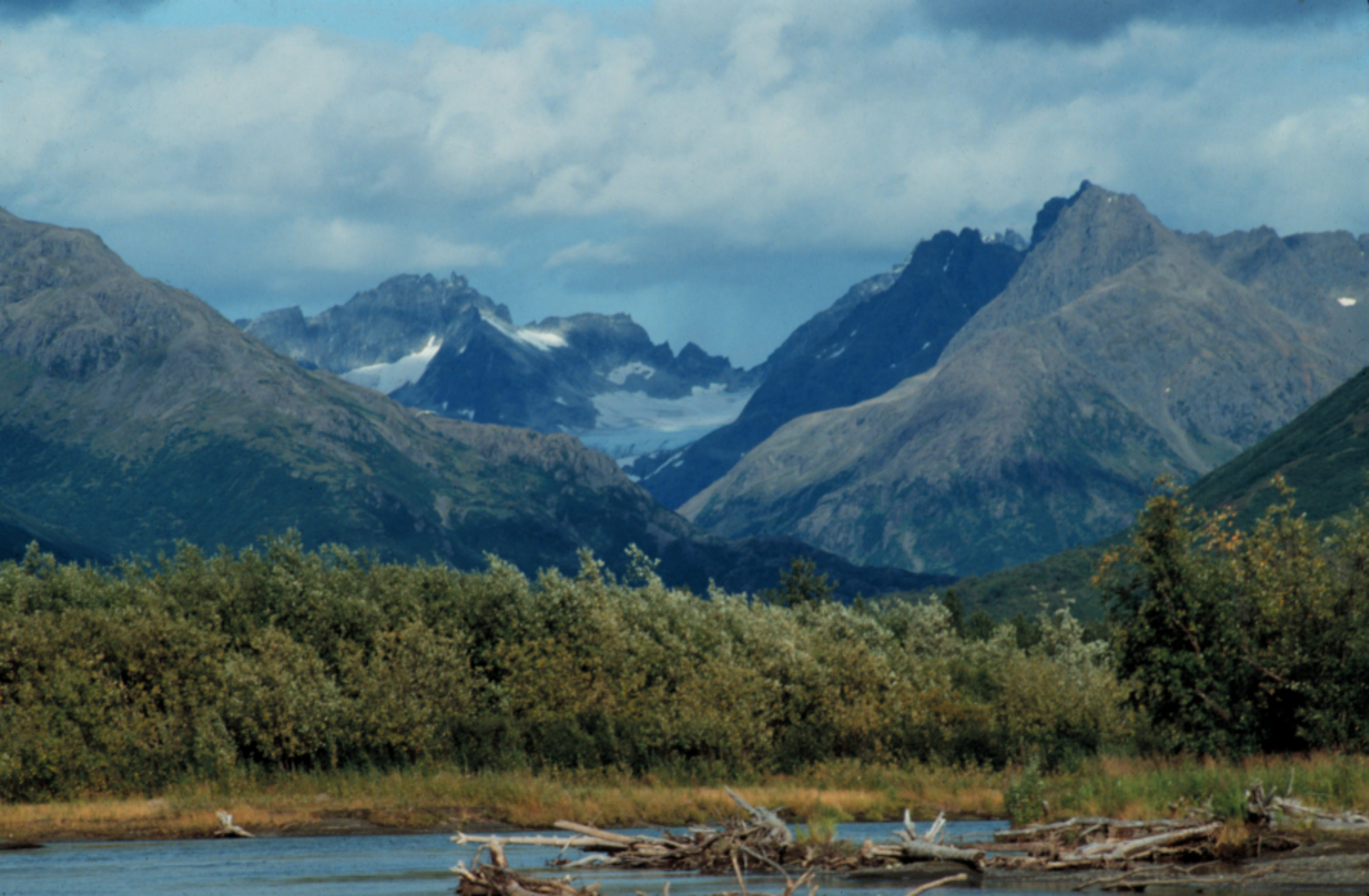
- The Ahklun and Wood River Mountains

- 1107. Beringia upland tundra

Ecology
- Realm: Nearctic
- Biome: Tundra
- Bird species: bristle-thighed curlew, thick-billed murre, tufted puffin
- Mammal species: walrus, Arctic fox, tundra hare, polar bear, caribou, musk ox, beaver.

Geography
- Area: 97,300 km^{2} (37,600 mi^{2})
- Country: United States
- State: Alaska
- Geology: rocky coastal range

Conservation
- Habitat loss: 0%
- Protected: 0%

The Beringia upland tundra is a mountainous tundra ecoregion of North America, on the west coast of Alaska.

== Location ==
This ecoregion consists of three separate but similar areas of the Bering Sea coast of Alaska: the hills and mountains of the Seward Peninsula; the Ahklun Mountains in the southwest; and the hilly western half of St. Lawrence Island in the Bering Sea. All these are hilly areas climbing sometimes to steep barren mountain up to 1500m, and which still have a number of cirque glaciers. The climate varies of course from the coast to the icy peaks.

== Flora ==
The slopes are covered with a variety of lichens and other tundra plants, depending on altitude and drainage. The low-lying, wetter areas are similar to the surrounding Beringia lowland tundra ecoregion but the uplands are generally drier and dominated by sedges such as Eriophorum vaginatum and scrub such as the ericas Arctostaphylos alpina, Vaccinium vitis-idaea or Empetrum nigrum or mountain-avens (Dryas octopetala) and dwarf arctic birch (Betula nana). Sheltered valleys will have some spruce or poplar trees Picea glauca and Populus balsamifera. The Seward Peninsula is vulnerable to fire when the lichens dry out in summer

== Fauna ==
Birds of this coast include the rare shorebird bristle-thighed curlew (Numenius tahitiensis) which breeds only in Alaska, spectacled eider (Somateria fischeri), a number of turnstones (Arenaria spp.), and in the river valleys blackpoll warblers (Dendroica striata). The cliffs of the Seward Peninsula and St. Lawrence Island in particular are nesting sites for a variety of seabirds including common murre and thick-billed murre (Uria aalge and Uria lomvia) and tufted puffin (Fratercula cirrhata)

The ecoregion also includes the Walrus Islands in Togiak Bay which as the name would suggest are home to Alaska's largest concentration of walrus in summer.

== Threats and preservation ==
There are small human communities in the region, some mining on the Seward Peninsula and some possible over-hunting of caribou, but these are large blocks of largely unspoilt habitat. Protected areas include Wood-Tikchik State Park, Walrus Islands State Game Sanctuary, Yukon Delta National Wildlife Refuge, and Togiak National Wildlife Refuge.

== See also ==
- List of ecoregions in the United States (WWF)
