= List of ecoregions in the United States (WWF) =

Ecoregions of North America, featuring the 50 United States, the District of Columbia and the five inhabited territories

The following is a list of United States ecoregions as identified by the World Wide Fund for Nature (WWF). The United States is a megadiverse country with a high level of endemism across a wide variety of ecosystems.

== Terrestrial ecoregions ==
The United States is unique among countries in that its terrestrial ecoregions span three biogeographic realms: the Nearctic, Neotropical, and Oceanian realms.

=== Fifty states ===
Alaska is the most biodiverse state with 15 ecoregions across three biomes in the same realm. California comes in a close second with 13 ecoregions across four biomes in the same realm. By contrast, Rhode Island is the least biodiverse with just one ecoregion—the Northeastern coastal forests—encompassing the entire state.

The terrestrial ecoregions of the 50 states of the United States are as follows:

Realm	Biome	Ecoregion	State
Nearctic	Boreal forests/taiga	Alaska Peninsula montane taiga	Alaska
Nearctic	Boreal forests/taiga	Cook Inlet taiga	Alaska
Nearctic	Boreal forests/taiga	Copper Plateau taiga	Alaska
Nearctic	Boreal forests/taiga	Interior Alaska–Yukon lowland taiga	Alaska
Nearctic	Deserts and xeric shrublands	Chihuahuan Desert	Arizona
Nearctic	Deserts and xeric shrublands	Chihuahuan Desert	New Mexico
Nearctic	Deserts and xeric shrublands	Chihuahuan Desert	Texas
Nearctic	Deserts and xeric shrublands	Colorado Plateau shrublands	Arizona
Nearctic	Deserts and xeric shrublands	Colorado Plateau shrublands	Colorado
Nearctic	Deserts and xeric shrublands	Colorado Plateau shrublands	New Mexico
Nearctic	Deserts and xeric shrublands	Colorado Plateau shrublands	Utah
Nearctic	Deserts and xeric shrublands	Great Basin shrub steppe	California
Nearctic	Deserts and xeric shrublands	Great Basin shrub steppe	Idaho
Nearctic	Deserts and xeric shrublands	Great Basin shrub steppe	Nevada
Nearctic	Deserts and xeric shrublands	Great Basin shrub steppe	Utah
Nearctic	Deserts and xeric shrublands	Mojave Desert	Arizona
Nearctic	Deserts and xeric shrublands	Mojave Desert	California
Nearctic	Deserts and xeric shrublands	Mojave Desert	Nevada
Nearctic	Deserts and xeric shrublands	Mojave Desert	Utah
Nearctic	Deserts and xeric shrublands	Snake-Columbia shrub steppe	California
Nearctic	Deserts and xeric shrublands	Snake-Columbia shrub steppe	Idaho
Nearctic	Deserts and xeric shrublands	Snake-Columbia shrub steppe	Nevada
Nearctic	Deserts and xeric shrublands	Snake-Columbia shrub steppe	Oregon
Nearctic	Deserts and xeric shrublands	Snake-Columbia shrub steppe	Washington
Nearctic	Deserts and xeric shrublands	Sonoran Desert	Arizona
Nearctic	Deserts and xeric shrublands	Sonoran Desert	California
Nearctic	Deserts and xeric shrublands	Tamaulipan mezquital	Texas
Nearctic	Deserts and xeric shrublands	Wyoming Basin shrub steppe	Colorado
Nearctic	Deserts and xeric shrublands	Wyoming Basin shrub steppe	Idaho
Nearctic	Deserts and xeric shrublands	Wyoming Basin shrub steppe	Montana
Nearctic	Deserts and xeric shrublands	Wyoming Basin shrub steppe	Utah
Nearctic	Deserts and xeric shrublands	Wyoming Basin shrub steppe	Wyoming
Nearctic	Mediterranean forests, woodlands, and scrub	California coastal sage and chaparral	California
Nearctic	Mediterranean forests, woodlands, and scrub	California interior chaparral and woodlands	California
Nearctic	Mediterranean forests, woodlands, and scrub	California montane chaparral and woodlands	California
Nearctic	Temperate broadleaf and mixed forests	Allegheny Highlands forests	New Jersey
Nearctic	Temperate broadleaf and mixed forests	Allegheny Highlands forests	New York
Nearctic	Temperate broadleaf and mixed forests	Allegheny Highlands forests	Ohio
Nearctic	Temperate broadleaf and mixed forests	Allegheny Highlands forests	Pennsylvania
Nearctic	Temperate broadleaf and mixed forests	Appalachian mixed mesophytic forests	Alabama
Nearctic	Temperate broadleaf and mixed forests	Appalachian mixed mesophytic forests	Georgia
Nearctic	Temperate broadleaf and mixed forests	Appalachian mixed mesophytic forests	Kentucky
Nearctic	Temperate broadleaf and mixed forests	Appalachian mixed mesophytic forests	Maryland
Nearctic	Temperate broadleaf and mixed forests	Appalachian mixed mesophytic forests	North Carolina
Nearctic	Temperate broadleaf and mixed forests	Appalachian mixed mesophytic forests	Ohio
Nearctic	Temperate broadleaf and mixed forests	Appalachian mixed mesophytic forests	Pennsylvania
Nearctic	Temperate broadleaf and mixed forests	Appalachian mixed mesophytic forests	Tennessee
Nearctic	Temperate broadleaf and mixed forests	Appalachian mixed mesophytic forests	Virginia
Nearctic	Temperate broadleaf and mixed forests	Appalachian mixed mesophytic forests	West Virginia
Nearctic	Temperate broadleaf and mixed forests	Appalachian–Blue Ridge forests	Alabama
Nearctic	Temperate broadleaf and mixed forests	Appalachian–Blue Ridge forests	Georgia
Nearctic	Temperate broadleaf and mixed forests	Appalachian–Blue Ridge forests	Maryland
Nearctic	Temperate broadleaf and mixed forests	Appalachian–Blue Ridge forests	New Jersey
Nearctic	Temperate broadleaf and mixed forests	Appalachian–Blue Ridge forests	New York
Nearctic	Temperate broadleaf and mixed forests	Appalachian–Blue Ridge forests	North Carolina
Nearctic	Temperate broadleaf and mixed forests	Appalachian–Blue Ridge forests	Pennsylvania
Nearctic	Temperate broadleaf and mixed forests	Appalachian–Blue Ridge forests	South Carolina
Nearctic	Temperate broadleaf and mixed forests	Appalachian–Blue Ridge forests	Tennessee
Nearctic	Temperate broadleaf and mixed forests	Appalachian–Blue Ridge forests	Virginia
Nearctic	Temperate broadleaf and mixed forests	Appalachian–Blue Ridge forests	West Virginia
Nearctic	Temperate broadleaf and mixed forests	Central U.S. hardwood forests	Alabama
Nearctic	Temperate broadleaf and mixed forests	Central U.S. hardwood forests	Arkansas
Nearctic	Temperate broadleaf and mixed forests	Central U.S. hardwood forests	Illinois
Nearctic	Temperate broadleaf and mixed forests	Central U.S. hardwood forests	Indiana
Nearctic	Temperate broadleaf and mixed forests	Central U.S. hardwood forests	Kentucky
Nearctic	Temperate broadleaf and mixed forests	Central U.S. hardwood forests	Mississippi
Nearctic	Temperate broadleaf and mixed forests	Central U.S. hardwood forests	Missouri
Nearctic	Temperate broadleaf and mixed forests	Central U.S. hardwood forests	Ohio
Nearctic	Temperate broadleaf and mixed forests	Central U.S. hardwood forests	Oklahoma
Nearctic	Temperate broadleaf and mixed forests	Central U.S. hardwood forests	Tennessee
Nearctic	Temperate broadleaf and mixed forests	East Central Texas forests	Texas
Nearctic	Temperate broadleaf and mixed forests	Eastern Great Lakes lowland forests	New York
Nearctic	Temperate broadleaf and mixed forests	Eastern Great Lakes lowland forests	Vermont
Nearctic	Temperate broadleaf and mixed forests	Eastern forest–boreal transition	New York
Nearctic	Temperate broadleaf and mixed forests	Mississippi lowland forests	Arkansas
Nearctic	Temperate broadleaf and mixed forests	Mississippi lowland forests	Illinois
Nearctic	Temperate broadleaf and mixed forests	Mississippi lowland forests	Kentucky
Nearctic	Temperate broadleaf and mixed forests	Mississippi lowland forests	Louisiana
Nearctic	Temperate broadleaf and mixed forests	Mississippi lowland forests	Mississippi
Nearctic	Temperate broadleaf and mixed forests	Mississippi lowland forests	Missouri
Nearctic	Temperate broadleaf and mixed forests	Mississippi lowland forests	Tennessee
Nearctic	Temperate broadleaf and mixed forests	New England–Acadian forests	Connecticut
Nearctic	Temperate broadleaf and mixed forests	New England–Acadian forests	Maine
Nearctic	Temperate broadleaf and mixed forests	New England–Acadian forests	Massachusetts
Nearctic	Temperate broadleaf and mixed forests	New England–Acadian forests	New Hampshire
Nearctic	Temperate broadleaf and mixed forests	New England–Acadian forests	New York
Nearctic	Temperate broadleaf and mixed forests	New England–Acadian forests	Vermont
Nearctic	Temperate broadleaf and mixed forests	Northeastern coastal forests	Connecticut
Nearctic	Temperate broadleaf and mixed forests	Northeastern coastal forests	Delaware
Nearctic	Temperate broadleaf and mixed forests	Northeastern coastal forests	Maine
Nearctic	Temperate broadleaf and mixed forests	Northeastern coastal forests	Maryland
Nearctic	Temperate broadleaf and mixed forests	Northeastern coastal forests	Massachusetts
Nearctic	Temperate broadleaf and mixed forests	Northeastern coastal forests	New Hampshire
Nearctic	Temperate broadleaf and mixed forests	Northeastern coastal forests	New Jersey
Nearctic	Temperate broadleaf and mixed forests	Northeastern coastal forests	New York
Nearctic	Temperate broadleaf and mixed forests	Northeastern coastal forests	Pennsylvania
Nearctic	Temperate broadleaf and mixed forests	Northeastern coastal forests	Rhode Island
Nearctic	Temperate broadleaf and mixed forests	Northeastern coastal forests	Vermont
Nearctic	Temperate broadleaf and mixed forests	Ozark Mountain forests	Arkansas
Nearctic	Temperate broadleaf and mixed forests	Ozark Mountain forests	Oklahoma
Nearctic	Temperate broadleaf and mixed forests	Southeastern mixed forests	Alabama
Nearctic	Temperate broadleaf and mixed forests	Southeastern mixed forests	Georgia
Nearctic	Temperate broadleaf and mixed forests	Southeastern mixed forests	Louisiana
Nearctic	Temperate broadleaf and mixed forests	Southeastern mixed forests	Maryland
Nearctic	Temperate broadleaf and mixed forests	Southeastern mixed forests	Mississippi
Nearctic	Temperate broadleaf and mixed forests	Southeastern mixed forests	North Carolina
Nearctic	Temperate broadleaf and mixed forests	Southeastern mixed forests	Pennsylvania
Nearctic	Temperate broadleaf and mixed forests	Southeastern mixed forests	South Carolina
Nearctic	Temperate broadleaf and mixed forests	Southeastern mixed forests	Tennessee
Nearctic	Temperate broadleaf and mixed forests	Southeastern mixed forests	Virginia
Nearctic	Temperate broadleaf and mixed forests	Southern Great Lakes forests	Indiana
Nearctic	Temperate broadleaf and mixed forests	Southern Great Lakes forests	Michigan
Nearctic	Temperate broadleaf and mixed forests	Southern Great Lakes forests	New York
Nearctic	Temperate broadleaf and mixed forests	Southern Great Lakes forests	Ohio
Nearctic	Temperate broadleaf and mixed forests	Southern Great Lakes forests	Pennsylvania
Nearctic	Temperate broadleaf and mixed forests	Upper Midwest forest–savanna transition	Illinois
Nearctic	Temperate broadleaf and mixed forests	Upper Midwest forest–savanna transition	Iowa
Nearctic	Temperate broadleaf and mixed forests	Upper Midwest forest–savanna transition	Michigan
Nearctic	Temperate broadleaf and mixed forests	Upper Midwest forest–savanna transition	Minnesota
Nearctic	Temperate broadleaf and mixed forests	Upper Midwest forest–savanna transition	Wisconsin
Nearctic	Temperate broadleaf and mixed forests	Western Great Lakes forests	Michigan
Nearctic	Temperate broadleaf and mixed forests	Western Great Lakes forests	Minnesota
Nearctic	Temperate broadleaf and mixed forests	Western Great Lakes forests	Wisconsin
Nearctic	Temperate broadleaf and mixed forests	Willamette Valley forests	Oregon
Nearctic	Temperate broadleaf and mixed forests	Willamette Valley forests	Washington
Nearctic	Temperate coniferous forests	Arizona Mountains forests	Arizona
Nearctic	Temperate coniferous forests	Arizona Mountains forests	New Mexico
Nearctic	Temperate coniferous forests	Arizona Mountains forests	Texas
Nearctic	Temperate coniferous forests	Atlantic coastal pine barrens	Massachusetts
Nearctic	Temperate coniferous forests	Atlantic coastal pine barrens	New Jersey
Nearctic	Temperate coniferous forests	Atlantic coastal pine barrens	New York
Nearctic	Temperate coniferous forests	Blue Mountains forests	Idaho
Nearctic	Temperate coniferous forests	Blue Mountains forests	Oregon
Nearctic	Temperate coniferous forests	Blue Mountains forests	Washington
Nearctic	Temperate coniferous forests	British Columbia mainland coastal forests	Washington
Nearctic	Temperate coniferous forests	Cascade Mountains leeward forests	Washington
Nearctic	Temperate coniferous forests	Central Pacific coastal forests	Oregon
Nearctic	Temperate coniferous forests	Central Pacific coastal forests	Washington
Nearctic	Temperate coniferous forests	Central and Southern Cascades forests	Oregon
Nearctic	Temperate coniferous forests	Central and Southern Cascades forests	Washington
Nearctic	Temperate coniferous forests	Colorado Rockies forests	Colorado
Nearctic	Temperate coniferous forests	Colorado Rockies forests	New Mexico
Nearctic	Temperate coniferous forests	Colorado Rockies forests	Wyoming
Nearctic	Temperate coniferous forests	Eastern Cascades forests	California
Nearctic	Temperate coniferous forests	Eastern Cascades forests	Oregon
Nearctic	Temperate coniferous forests	Eastern Cascades forests	Washington
Nearctic	Temperate coniferous forests	Florida sand pine scrub	Florida
Nearctic	Temperate coniferous forests	Great Basin montane forests	California
Nearctic	Temperate coniferous forests	Great Basin montane forests	Nevada
Nearctic	Temperate coniferous forests	Great Basin montane forests	Oregon
Nearctic	Temperate coniferous forests	Klamath–Siskiyou forests	California
Nearctic	Temperate coniferous forests	Klamath–Siskiyou forests	Oregon
Nearctic	Temperate coniferous forests	Middle Atlantic coastal forests	Delaware
Nearctic	Temperate coniferous forests	Middle Atlantic coastal forests	Georgia
Nearctic	Temperate coniferous forests	Middle Atlantic coastal forests	Maryland
Nearctic	Temperate coniferous forests	Middle Atlantic coastal forests	North Carolina
Nearctic	Temperate coniferous forests	Middle Atlantic coastal forests	South Carolina
Nearctic	Temperate coniferous forests	Middle Atlantic coastal forests	Virginia
Nearctic	Temperate coniferous forests	North Central Rockies forests	Idaho
Nearctic	Temperate coniferous forests	North Central Rockies forests	Montana
Nearctic	Temperate coniferous forests	North Central Rockies forests	Washington
Nearctic	Temperate coniferous forests	Northern California coastal forests	California
Nearctic	Temperate coniferous forests	Northern California coastal forests	Oregon
Nearctic	Temperate coniferous forests	Northern Pacific coastal forests	Alaska
Nearctic	Temperate coniferous forests	Okanagan dry forests	Washington
Nearctic	Temperate coniferous forests	Piney Woods forests	Arkansas
Nearctic	Temperate coniferous forests	Piney Woods forests	Louisiana
Nearctic	Temperate coniferous forests	Piney Woods forests	Oklahoma
Nearctic	Temperate coniferous forests	Piney Woods forests	Texas
Nearctic	Temperate coniferous forests	Puget lowland forests	Washington
Nearctic	Temperate coniferous forests	Sierra Nevada forests	California
Nearctic	Temperate coniferous forests	Sierra Nevada forests	Nevada
Nearctic	Temperate coniferous forests	South Central Rockies forests	Idaho
Nearctic	Temperate coniferous forests	South Central Rockies forests	Montana
Nearctic	Temperate coniferous forests	South Central Rockies forests	South Dakota
Nearctic	Temperate coniferous forests	South Central Rockies forests	Wyoming
Nearctic	Temperate coniferous forests	Southeastern conifer forests	Alabama
Nearctic	Temperate coniferous forests	Southeastern conifer forests	Florida
Nearctic	Temperate coniferous forests	Southeastern conifer forests	Georgia
Nearctic	Temperate coniferous forests	Southeastern conifer forests	Louisiana
Nearctic	Temperate coniferous forests	Southeastern conifer forests	Mississippi
Nearctic	Temperate coniferous forests	Wasatch and Uinta montane forests	Idaho
Nearctic	Temperate coniferous forests	Wasatch and Uinta montane forests	Utah
Nearctic	Temperate coniferous forests	Wasatch and Uinta montane forests	Wyoming
Nearctic	Temperate grasslands, savannas, and shrublands	California Central Valley grasslands	California
Nearctic	Temperate grasslands, savannas, and shrublands	Canadian aspen forests and parklands	Minnesota
Nearctic	Temperate grasslands, savannas, and shrublands	Canadian aspen forests and parklands	North Dakota
Nearctic	Temperate grasslands, savannas, and shrublands	Central and Southern mixed grasslands	Kansas
Nearctic	Temperate grasslands, savannas, and shrublands	Central and Southern mixed grasslands	Nebraska
Nearctic	Temperate grasslands, savannas, and shrublands	Central and Southern mixed grasslands	Oklahoma
Nearctic	Temperate grasslands, savannas, and shrublands	Central and Southern mixed grasslands	Texas
Nearctic	Temperate grasslands, savannas, and shrublands	Central forest–grasslands transition	Illinois
Nearctic	Temperate grasslands, savannas, and shrublands	Central forest–grasslands transition	Indiana
Nearctic	Temperate grasslands, savannas, and shrublands	Central forest–grasslands transition	Iowa
Nearctic	Temperate grasslands, savannas, and shrublands	Central forest–grasslands transition	Kansas
Nearctic	Temperate grasslands, savannas, and shrublands	Central forest–grasslands transition	Missouri
Nearctic	Temperate grasslands, savannas, and shrublands	Central forest–grasslands transition	Oklahoma
Nearctic	Temperate grasslands, savannas, and shrublands	Central forest–grasslands transition	Texas
Nearctic	Temperate grasslands, savannas, and shrublands	Central forest–grasslands transition	Wisconsin
Nearctic	Temperate grasslands, savannas, and shrublands	Central tall grasslands	Iowa
Nearctic	Temperate grasslands, savannas, and shrublands	Central tall grasslands	Kansas
Nearctic	Temperate grasslands, savannas, and shrublands	Central tall grasslands	Minnesota
Nearctic	Temperate grasslands, savannas, and shrublands	Central tall grasslands	Missouri
Nearctic	Temperate grasslands, savannas, and shrublands	Central tall grasslands	Nebraska
Nearctic	Temperate grasslands, savannas, and shrublands	Central tall grasslands	North Dakota
Nearctic	Temperate grasslands, savannas, and shrublands	Central tall grasslands	South Dakota
Nearctic	Temperate grasslands, savannas, and shrublands	Central tall grasslands	Wisconsin
Nearctic	Temperate grasslands, savannas, and shrublands	Edwards Plateau savanna	Texas
Nearctic	Temperate grasslands, savannas, and shrublands	Flint Hills tall grasslands	Kansas
Nearctic	Temperate grasslands, savannas, and shrublands	Flint Hills tall grasslands	Oklahoma
Nearctic	Temperate grasslands, savannas, and shrublands	Montana valley and foothill grasslands	Montana
Nearctic	Temperate grasslands, savannas, and shrublands	Nebraska Sand Hills mixed grasslands	Nebraska
Nearctic	Temperate grasslands, savannas, and shrublands	Nebraska Sand Hills mixed grasslands	South Dakota
Nearctic	Temperate grasslands, savannas, and shrublands	Northern mixed grasslands	Nebraska
Nearctic	Temperate grasslands, savannas, and shrublands	Northern mixed grasslands	North Dakota
Nearctic	Temperate grasslands, savannas, and shrublands	Northern mixed grasslands	South Dakota
Nearctic	Temperate grasslands, savannas, and shrublands	Northern short grasslands	Montana
Nearctic	Temperate grasslands, savannas, and shrublands	Northern short grasslands	Nebraska
Nearctic	Temperate grasslands, savannas, and shrublands	Northern short grasslands	North Dakota
Nearctic	Temperate grasslands, savannas, and shrublands	Northern short grasslands	South Dakota
Nearctic	Temperate grasslands, savannas, and shrublands	Northern short grasslands	Wyoming
Nearctic	Temperate grasslands, savannas, and shrublands	Northern tall grasslands	Minnesota
Nearctic	Temperate grasslands, savannas, and shrublands	Northern tall grasslands	North Dakota
Nearctic	Temperate grasslands, savannas, and shrublands	Northern tall grasslands	South Dakota
Nearctic	Temperate grasslands, savannas, and shrublands	Palouse grasslands	Idaho
Nearctic	Temperate grasslands, savannas, and shrublands	Palouse grasslands	Oregon
Nearctic	Temperate grasslands, savannas, and shrublands	Palouse grasslands	Washington
Nearctic	Temperate grasslands, savannas, and shrublands	Texas blackland prairies	Texas
Nearctic	Temperate grasslands, savannas, and shrublands	Western short grasslands	Colorado
Nearctic	Temperate grasslands, savannas, and shrublands	Western short grasslands	Kansas
Nearctic	Temperate grasslands, savannas, and shrublands	Western short grasslands	Nebraska
Nearctic	Temperate grasslands, savannas, and shrublands	Western short grasslands	New Mexico
Nearctic	Temperate grasslands, savannas, and shrublands	Western short grasslands	Oklahoma
Nearctic	Temperate grasslands, savannas, and shrublands	Western short grasslands	South Dakota
Nearctic	Temperate grasslands, savannas, and shrublands	Western short grasslands	Texas
Nearctic	Temperate grasslands, savannas, and shrublands	Western short grasslands	Wyoming
Nearctic	Tropical and subtropical coniferous forests	Sierra Madre Occidental pine–oak forests	Arizona
Nearctic	Tropical and subtropical coniferous forests	Sierra Madre Occidental pine–oak forests	New Mexico
Nearctic	Temperate broadleaf and mixed forests	Sierra Madre Oriental pine–oak forests	Texas
Nearctic	Tropical and subtropical grasslands, savannas, and shrublands	Western Gulf coastal grasslands	Louisiana
Nearctic	Tropical and subtropical grasslands, savannas, and shrublands	Western Gulf coastal grasslands	Mississippi
Nearctic	Tropical and subtropical grasslands, savannas, and shrublands	Western Gulf coastal grasslands	Texas
Nearctic	Tundra	Alaska–St. Elias Range tundra	Alaska
Nearctic	Tundra	Aleutian Islands tundra	Alaska
Nearctic	Tundra	Arctic coastal tundra	Alaska
Nearctic	Tundra	Arctic foothills tundra	Alaska
Nearctic	Tundra	Beringia lowland tundra	Alaska
Nearctic	Tundra	Beringia upland tundra	Alaska
Nearctic	Tundra	Brooks–British Range tundra	Alaska
Nearctic	Tundra	Interior Yukon–Alaska alpine tundra	Alaska
Nearctic	Tundra	Ogilvie–MacKenzie alpine tundra	Alaska
Nearctic	Tundra	Pacific Coastal Mountain icefields and tundra	Alaska
Neotropical	Flooded grasslands and savannas	Everglades	Florida
Neotropical	Tropical and subtropical moist broadleaf forests	South Florida rocklands	Florida
Oceanian	Tropical and subtropical dry broadleaf forests	Hawaiian tropical dry forests	Hawaii
Oceanian	Tropical and subtropical grasslands, savannas, and shrublands	Hawaiian tropical high shrublands	Hawaii
Oceanian	Tropical and subtropical grasslands, savannas, and shrublands	Hawaiian tropical low shrublands	Hawaii
Oceanian	Tropical and subtropical grasslands, savannas, and shrublands	Northwestern Hawaii scrub	Hawaii
Oceanian	Tropical and subtropical moist broadleaf forests	Hawaiian tropical rainforests	Hawaii

=== Five inhabited territories ===
The ecoregions of the 5 inhabited territories of the United States are as follows:

Realm	Biome	Ecoregion	Territory
Neotropical	Deserts and xeric shrublands	Leeward Islands xeric scrub	U.S. Virgin Islands
Neotropical	Mangroves	Greater Antilles mangroves	Puerto Rico
Neotropical	Mangroves	Greater Antilles mangroves	U.S. Virgin Islands
Neotropical	Tropical and subtropical dry broadleaf forests	Puerto Rican dry forests	Puerto Rico
Neotropical	Tropical and subtropical moist broadleaf forests	Leeward Islands moist forests	U.S. Virgin Islands
Neotropical	Tropical and subtropical moist broadleaf forests	Puerto Rican moist forests	Puerto Rico
Oceanian	Tropical and subtropical dry broadleaf forests	Marianas tropical dry forests	Guam
Oceanian	Tropical and subtropical dry broadleaf forests	Marianas tropical dry forests	Northern Mariana Islands
Oceanian	Tropical and subtropical moist broadleaf forests	Samoan tropical moist forests	American Samoa

== Marine ecoregions ==
The marine ecoregions of the 50 states of the United States are as follows:

Realm	Biome	Ecoregion	State
Arctic	Arctic	Beaufort Sea continental coast and shelf	Alaska
Arctic	Arctic	Chukchi Sea	Alaska
Arctic	Arctic	Eastern Bering Sea	Alaska
Eastern Indo-Pacific	Tropical Mid-Pacific (Hawaii)	Hawaiian Islands	Hawaii
Temperate Northern Atlantic	Cold Temperate Northwest Atlantic	Gulf of Maine-Bay of Fundy	Maine
Temperate Northern Atlantic	Cold Temperate Northwest Atlantic	Gulf of Maine-Bay of Fundy	Massachusetts
Temperate Northern Atlantic	Cold Temperate Northwest Atlantic	Gulf of Maine-Bay of Fundy	New Hampshire
Temperate Northern Atlantic	Cold Temperate Northwest Atlantic	Virginian	Connecticut
Temperate Northern Atlantic	Cold Temperate Northwest Atlantic	Virginian	Delaware
Temperate Northern Atlantic	Cold Temperate Northwest Atlantic	Virginian	Maryland
Temperate Northern Atlantic	Cold Temperate Northwest Atlantic	Virginian	Massachusetts
Temperate Northern Atlantic	Cold Temperate Northwest Atlantic	Virginian	New Jersey
Temperate Northern Atlantic	Cold Temperate Northwest Atlantic	Virginian	New York
Temperate Northern Atlantic	Cold Temperate Northwest Atlantic	Virginian	North Carolina
Temperate Northern Atlantic	Cold Temperate Northwest Atlantic	Virginian	Pennsylvania
Temperate Northern Atlantic	Cold Temperate Northwest Atlantic	Virginian	Rhode Island
Temperate Northern Atlantic	Cold Temperate Northwest Atlantic	Virginian	Virginia
Temperate Northern Atlantic	Warm Temperate Northwest Atlantic	Carolinian	Florida
Temperate Northern Atlantic	Warm Temperate Northwest Atlantic	Carolinian	Georgia
Temperate Northern Atlantic	Warm Temperate Northwest Atlantic	Carolinian	North Carolina
Temperate Northern Atlantic	Warm Temperate Northwest Atlantic	Carolinian	South Carolina
Temperate Northern Atlantic	Warm Temperate Northwest Atlantic	Northern Gulf of Mexico	Alabama
Temperate Northern Atlantic	Warm Temperate Northwest Atlantic	Northern Gulf of Mexico	Florida
Temperate Northern Atlantic	Warm Temperate Northwest Atlantic	Northern Gulf of Mexico	Louisiana
Temperate Northern Atlantic	Warm Temperate Northwest Atlantic	Northern Gulf of Mexico	Mississippi
Temperate Northern Atlantic	Warm Temperate Northwest Atlantic	Northern Gulf of Mexico	Texas
Temperate Northern Pacific	Cold Temperate Northeast Pacific	Aleutian Islands	Alaska
Temperate Northern Pacific	Cold Temperate Northeast Pacific	Gulf of Alaska	Alaska
Temperate Northern Pacific	Cold Temperate Northeast Pacific	North American Pacific Fjordland	Alaska
Temperate Northern Pacific	Cold Temperate Northeast Pacific	Northern California	California
Temperate Northern Pacific	Cold Temperate Northeast Pacific	Oregon, Washington, Vancouver coast and shelf	California
Temperate Northern Pacific	Cold Temperate Northeast Pacific	Oregon, Washington, Vancouver coast and shelf	Oregon
Temperate Northern Pacific	Cold Temperate Northeast Pacific	Oregon, Washington, Vancouver coast and shelf	Washington
Temperate Northern Pacific	Cold Temperate Northeast Pacific	Puget Trough/Georgia Basin	Washington
Temperate Northern Pacific	Warm Temperate Northeast Pacific	Southern California Bight	California
Tropical Atlantic	Tropical Northwestern Atlantic	Floridian	Florida

== See also ==
- Alternative classification framework
  - List of ecoregions in the United States (EPA)
- WWF ecoregions of neighboring countries
  - List of ecoregions in Canada (WWF)
  - List of ecoregions in Mexico (WWF)
