= Central forest–grasslands transition =

Temperate grasslands, savannas, and shrublands ecoregion of the United States

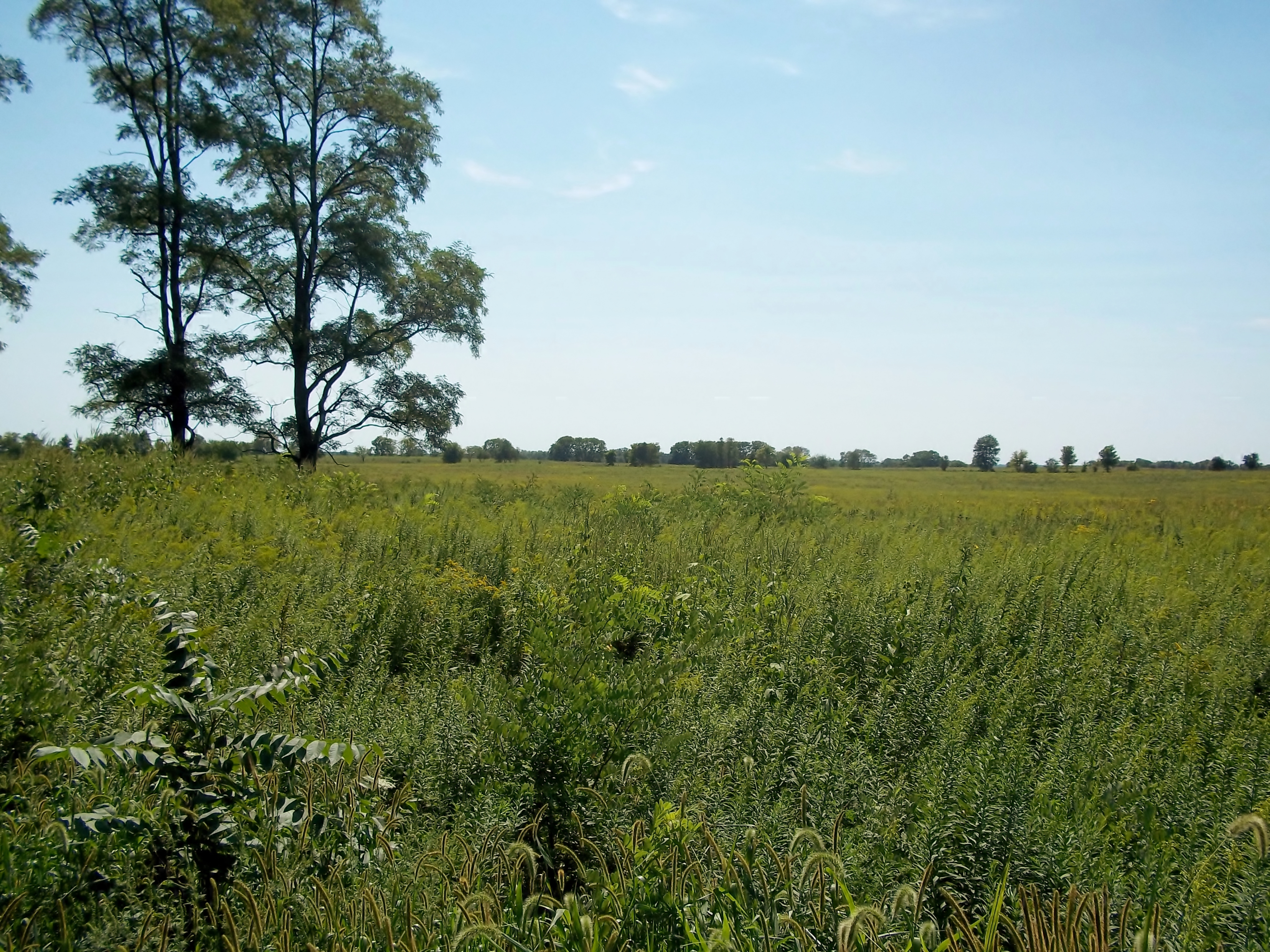
- Ecoregion preserve (Midewin -- Illinois)

Ecology
- Realm: Nearctic
- Biome: Temperate grasslands, savannas, and shrublands
- Borders: List: Upper Midwest forest–savanna transition; Southern Great Lakes forests; Central U.S. hardwood forests; Ozark Mountain forests; Piney Woods forests; East Central Texas forests; Texas blackland prairies; Edwards Plateau savanna; Central and Southern mixed grasslands; Flint Hills tall grasslands; Central tall grasslands
- Bird species: 234
- Mammal species: 81

Geography
- Area: 407,000 km^{2} (157,000 mi^{2})
- Country: United States
- States: Indiana; Illinois; Iowa; Missouri; Kansas; Oklahoma; Texas
- Climate type: Humid continental (Dfa) and humid subtropical (Cfa)

Conservation
- Habitat loss: 67.6%
- Protected: 2.09%

The central forest–grasslands transition is a prairie ecoregion of the central United States, an ecotone between eastern forests and the North American Great Plains. It is a classification defined by the World Wildlife Fund.

== Setting ==
This is a large area covering 407,000 square kilometres (157,000 sq mi) from northern Illinois through most of Missouri, eastern Kansas, Oklahoma and into Texas. This area was traditionally a mixture of woodland and tall grass prairie, which as the soil consists of highly fertile mollisols, most of the area has been converted to farmland. Rainfall varies from 600 to 1040 mm per year and the area is vulnerable to drought and fire. Along with the Upper Midwest forest–savanna transition this ecoregion separates the Central U.S. hardwood forests to the east from the largely treeless Central and Southern mixed grasslands and Central tall grasslands to the west.

== Fauna ==
This ecoregion is rich in reptiles, birds and insects. Birds of the area include the greater prairie chicken. Reptiles include the Osage copperhead snake.

== Threats and preservation ==
The area has almost entirely been converted to agriculture, particularly planting corn and soybeans. Remaining blocks of intact habitat are small and include the Emiquon National Wildlife Refuge an important stopover for migrating birds located across the Illinois River from the town of Havana in western Illinois. Other spots of unspoilt prairie occur in Goose Lake Prairie State Natural Area, Midewin National Tallgrass Prairie and the Kankakee Outwash Plain in Illinois; Indiana Dunes National Park in northwest Indiana; the Cross Timbers in southern Kansas and central Oklahoma; and the Osage Plains in the south of the ecoregion. However these are all highly fragmented although there are many protected areas in the ecoregion, for example, Prairie State Park in Missouri, and there are also several small tall grass prairie reservations in Cook County, Illinois, including the National Natural Landmark, Gensburg-Markham Prairie.

== See also ==
- Oak savanna
- List of ecoregions in the United States (WWF)
