= Canadian Aspen Forests and Parklands =

Ecoregion in Canada and the United States

Coordinates: 31°N 100°W

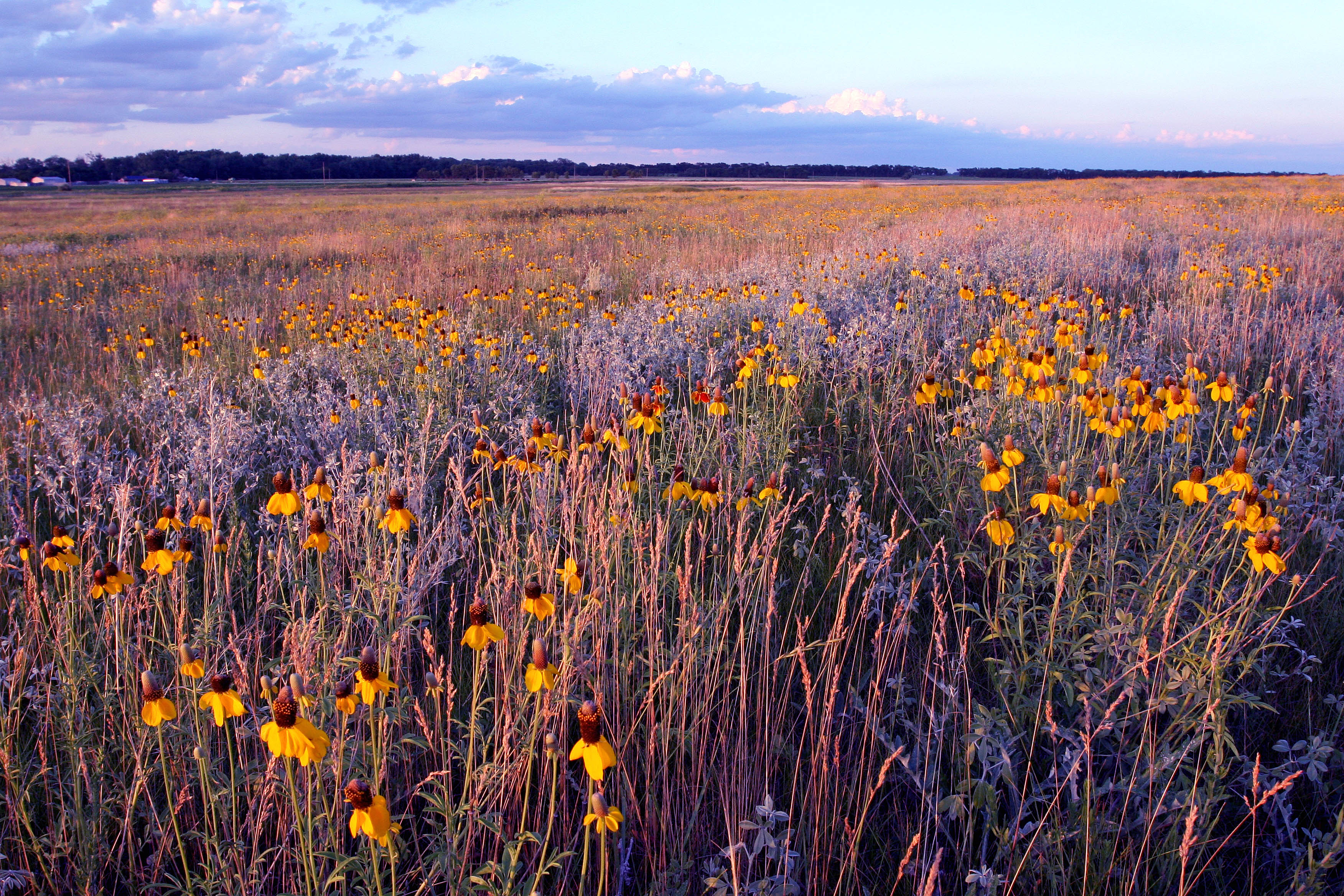
- A patch of mixed grassland in J. Clark Salyer NWR

- Canadian Aspen Forests and Parklands

Ecology
- Realm: Nearctic
- Biome: Temperate grasslands, savannas, and shrublands
- Borders: List: Canadian Aspen forests and parklands; Central and Southern mixed grasslands; Central tall grasslands; Montana Valley and Foothill grasslands; Nebraska Sand Hills mixed grasslands; Northern short grasslands; Northern tall grasslands
- Bird species: ?
- Mammal species: ?

Geography
- Country: Canada and United States
- States/Provinces: Alberta, Saskatchewan, Manitoba, North Dakota, South Dakota, Nebraska
- Climate type: Humid continental (hot summer in south) (Dfa and Dfb)

Conservation
- Global 200: Yes
- Habitat loss: 75%
- Protected: Very low%

The Canadian Aspen Forests and Parklands is one of 844 terrestrial ecoregions defined by One Earth. This ecoregion includes parts of the Canadian provinces of Alberta, Saskatchewan, and Manitoba, north-central and eastern (except extreme eastern) North Dakota, most of east South Dakota, and north-central Nebraska in the American Great Plains. The United States Environmental Protection Agency (EPA) defines this ecoregion as the Northern Glaciated Plains.

== Setting ==
This is a transition zone between the ecoregions of the Northern tall grasslands to the east and the Northern short grasslands to the west, while to the north lie the cooler Canadian boreal forests and a much shorter growing season.

== Environment ==
Flora

In the northern parts of the ecoregion, the transitional grassland ecoclimate supports a vegetation of Quaking aspen (Populus tremuloides), Bur oak (Quercus macrocarpa) groves, mixed tall shrubs, and intermittent fescue grasslands. Generally, quaking aspen and shrubs occur on moist sites while bur oak and grass species occur on increasingly drier sites. The southeast portion of the ecoregion tends to be warmer and drier. Remaining native vegetation in this portion of the ecoregion is dominated by spear grass and wheat grass. In addition, local saline deposits support alkali grass, wild barley, red samphire, and seablite. In the separated Cypress Upland, fescue and wheatgrass grow below 1000 m, and mixed montane forests of lodgepole pine, deciduous trees and shrubs grow at higher elevations. Larkspur (Delphinium sp.), death camas (Zigadenus elegans), and wild lupine (Lupinus sp.) are found here and nowhere else in the prairies.

The mixed grass prairie was recognized as a mixture of the tallgrass and shortgrass prairies. The dominant grasses found here include grama (Bouteloua gracilis), little bluestem (Schizachyrium scoparium), needle-and-thread grass (Stipa comata), wheatgrass (Agropyron smithii), Carex filifolia, junegrass (Koeleria cristata), and Poa secunda.

Fauna

The topography is broken by many glacial pothole lakes, making this ecoregion the most productive breeding area for waterfowl in the U.S. Other wildlife characteristic of the moist mixed grassland are black-tailed and white-tailed deer (Odocoileus hemionus and O. virginianus), pronghorn antelope (Antilocapra americana), coyote (Canis latrans), short-horned lizard (Phrynosoma douglassi), western rattlesnake (Crotalus viridis), rabbit (Sylvilagus sp.) and sage grouse (Centrocercus urophasianus). Yellow-rumped warbler (Dendroica coronata) is also found only in this part of the prairies. Bison were once a common feature of this ecoregion.

== Threats and preservation ==
The ecoregion provides significant waterfowl production for the continent and is a major staging area. It is estimated that up to 80 percent of the wetlands, however, have been lost or degraded. The Cypress Uplands (Alberta/Saskatchewan), which are believed to have escaped the last glaciation, are located in this ecoregion.

No completely intact blocks of habitat remain. Restoration of some areas is just beginning. Few sites are protected.

== See also ==
- List of ecoregions in Canada (WWF)
- List of ecoregions in the United States (WWF)
- Alternative classification framework
  - List of ecoregions in the United States (EPA)
