= Paradise Marsh Wildlife Area =

State Wildlife Area in Columbia County, Wisconsin

- Paradise Marsh State Wildlife Area
- IUCN category V (protected landscape/seascape)
- Location within Wisconsin Location within the United States
- Location: Columbia County, Wisconsin
- Nearest city: Columbus, WI
- Coordinates: 43°28′24″N 89°3′36″W
- Area: 1,588 acres (6.43 km^{2})
- Established: 1962
- Governing body: Wisconsin Department of Natural Resources

The Paradise Marsh Wildlife Area is a 1,588 acres (643 ha) tract of protected land located in Columbia County, Wisconsin, managed by the Wisconsin Department of Natural Resources (WDNR). Land to be used for the Wildlife Area was first acquired in 1962 with the hopes of improving the habitat conditions for various waterfowl. In addition to conservation of wildlife, plans for further draining the marsh were laid out, with the marsh previously being drained as early as the early 1900s.

== Paradise Marsh ==
The marsh itself is considered by the WDNR to be a satellite marsh for the significantly larger Horicon National Wildlife Refuge. While one of the original objectives of the marsh was to drain the marsh and increase drainage ability after flooding, extensive ditch-digging and repeated excavations of the area have caused the Wildlife Area's condition to deteriorate. A water control structure and dike are now in place in the marsh to prevent further degradation.

== Flora and Fauna ==
The most prominent species of trees that can be found in the Wildlife Area are Oak and Hickory, in addition to various hardwood trees and savanna trees native to the region. The expansion of cattails is of particular concern for the WDNR, as well as other invasive plant species.

A popular activity in the Wildlife Area is trapping, with there being a sizable population of both mink and muskrat in the Marsh. Hunting is also popular, with most of it taking place in the sunflower fields, planted specifically to create a habitat for mourning doves.

== See also ==
- Columbus
- Marsh
