= Central tall grasslands =

Temperate grasslands, savannas, and shrublands ecoregion of the United States

Coordinates: 43°N 95°W

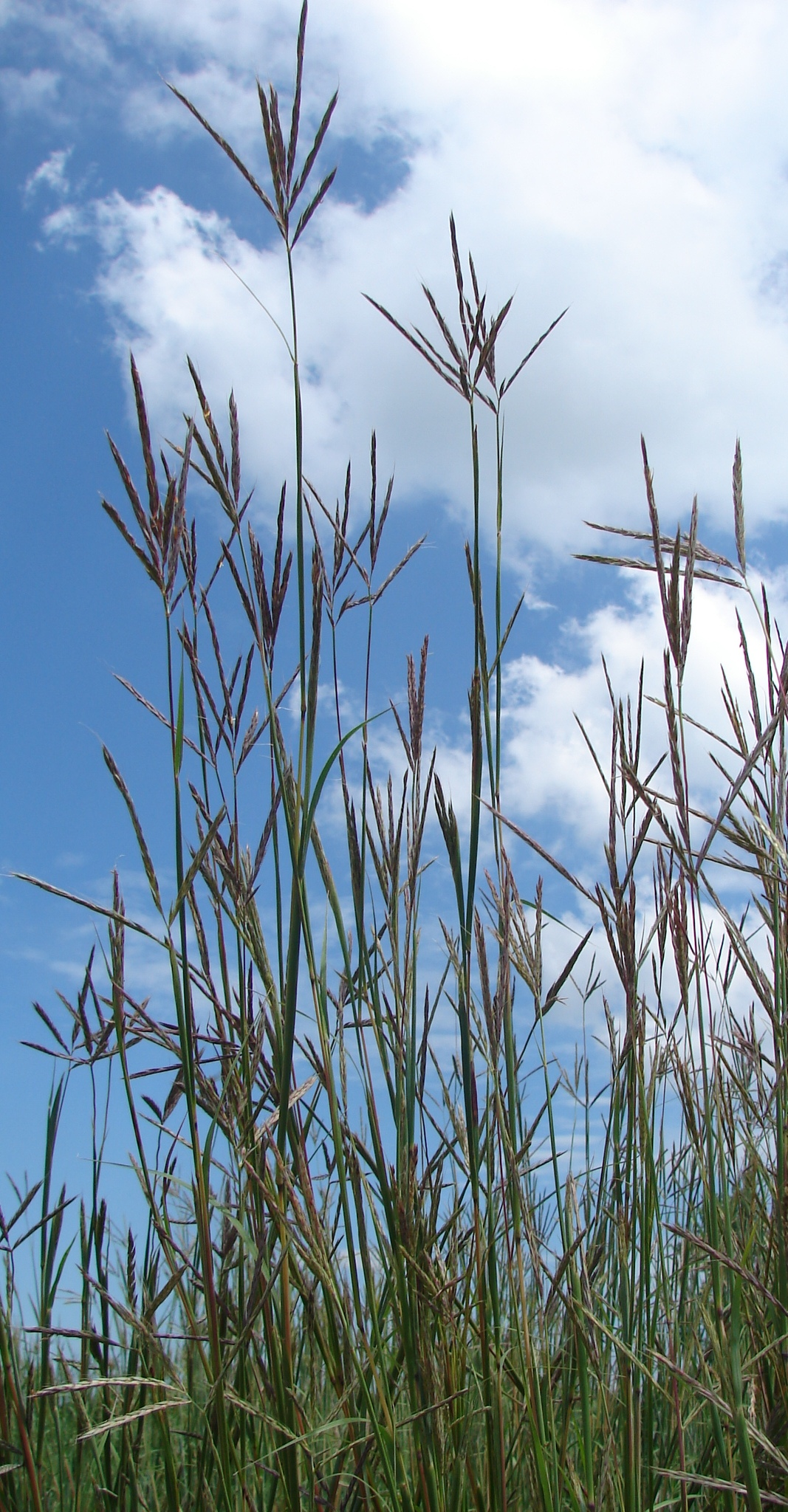
- Big bluestem, Andropogon gerardi

Ecology
- Realm: Nearctic
- Biome: Temperate grasslands, savannas, and shrublands
- Borders: List: Central and Southern mixed grasslands; Central forest-grasslands transition; Flint Hills tall grasslands; Northern mixed grasslands; Northern tall grasslands; Upper Midwest forest-savanna transition
- Bird species: 228
- Mammal species: 67

Geography
- Area: 248,400 km^{2} (95,900 mi^{2})
- Country: United States
- States: North Dakota; South Dakota; Nebraska; Minnesota; Iowa; Missouri; Wisconsin
- Climate type: Humid continental (Dfa)

Conservation
- Habitat loss: 95.7%
- Protected: 0.95%

The Central tall grasslands are a prairie ecoregion of the Midwestern United States, part of the North American Great Plains.

== Setting ==
This ecoregion covers a large area of southern Minnesota, most of Iowa, and a narrow strip from the southeast corner of North Dakota through eastern South Dakota and eastern Nebraska to northeastern Kansas. Rainfall here is 39 inches (1,000 mm) per year, higher than most of the Great Plains. The Northern tall grasslands lie to the north and have fewer and different species of grass, while the Flint Hills tall grasslands to the south have a rockier landscape.

== Flora ==
The high rainfall and long summer allows a rich plant cover and this area was once the largest area of tallgrass prairie in the world, with grasses reaching up to 7 feet (2 m) high and interspersed with many wildflowers. For example, 265 species of plants were recorded in Iowa, 237 in a square mile near Lincoln, Nebraska, and 225 in the Missouri River Valley.

However the soil is rich here and the original grasslands have now largely been converted to farmland, much more so than in the neighbouring Flint Hills tall grasslands, for example. The central tall grasslands are now a large part of the Corn Belt of the Midwest and covered with fields of corn and soybeans. Grasses of the area include big bluestem (Andropogon gerardi), switchgrass (Panicum virgatum) and Indian grass (Sorghastrum nutans).

== Fauna ==
This prairie was probably once grazing land for American bison (Bison bison) and elk (Cervus elaphus).

== Threats and preservation ==
No substantial areas of original grassland remain in this ecoregion, only fragmented remnants but prairie restoration is happening, for example, at Neal Smith National Wildlife Refuge in Jasper County, Iowa.

== See also ==
- List of ecoregions in the United States (WWF)
