= Northern Shortgrass Prairie =

Ecoregion of Canada and the United States

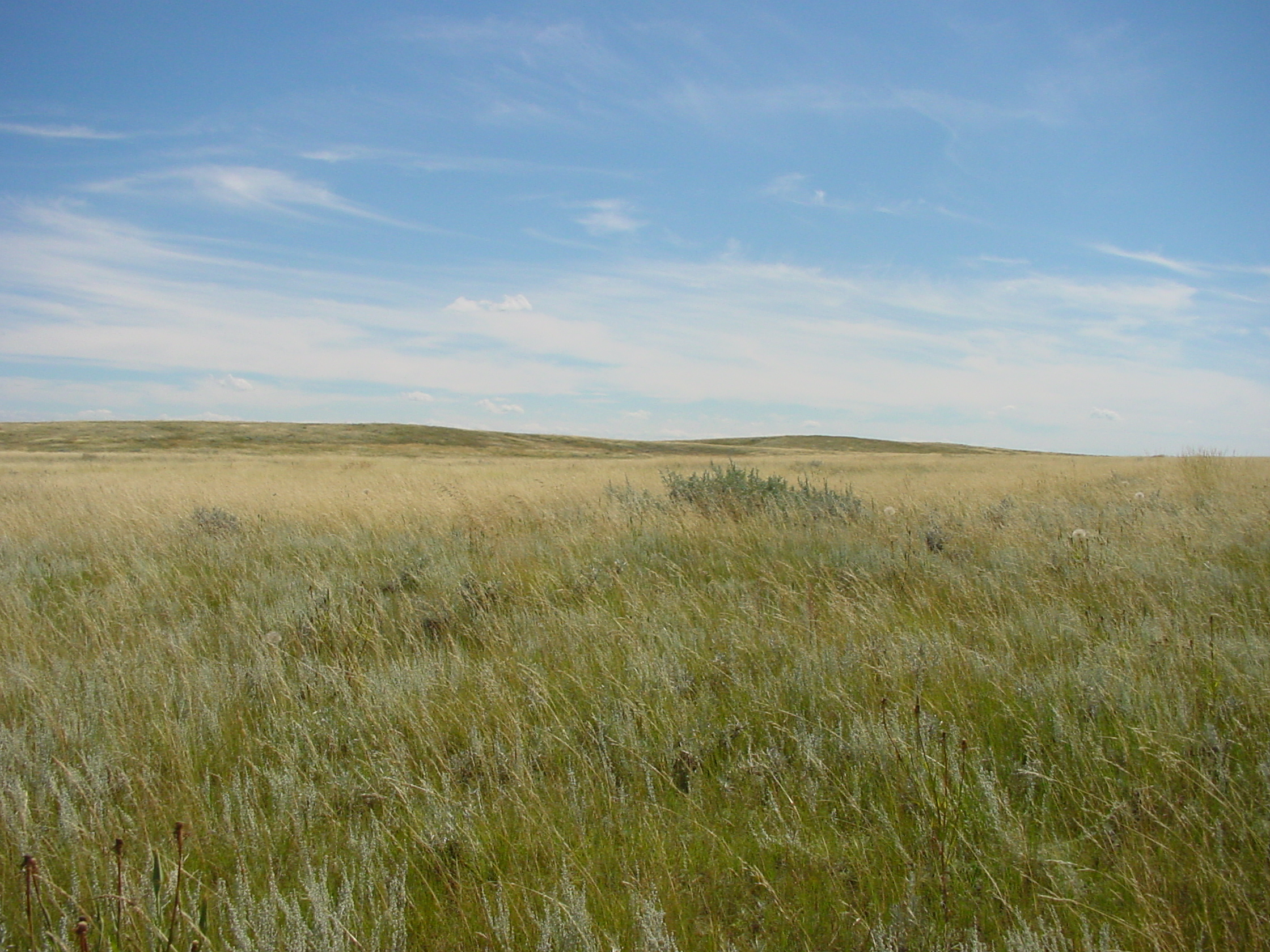
- Prairie in southeastern Alberta, Canada

Ecology
- Realm: Nearctic
- Biome: Temperate grasslands, savannas, and shrublands
- Borders: List: Montana Valley and Foothill grasslands; Northern mixed grasslands; Western short grasslands; Nebraska Sand Hills mixed grasslands; Wyoming Basin shrub steppe; South Central Rockies forests; Colorado Rockies forests
- Bird species: 231
- Mammal species: 78

Geography
- Area: 638,400 km^{2} (246,500 mi^{2})
- Countries: United States; Canada
- States/Provinces: Montana; North Dakota; Wyoming; South Dakota; Nebraska; Alberta; Saskatchewan
- Climate type: Cold semi-arid (BSk)

Conservation
- Conservation status: Critical/Endangered
- Global 200: Yes
- Habitat loss: 28.690%
- Protected: 14.8%

The Northern Shortgrass Prairie includes parts of the Canadian provinces of Alberta and Saskatchewan, and the United States Great Plains states of Montana, North Dakota, Wyoming, South Dakota and Nebraska. One of 844 terrestrial ecoregions defined by One Earth, the United States Environmental Protection Agency (EPA) further breaks this ecoregion into the Northwestern Glaciated Plains and Northwestern Great Plains.

== Climate ==
The Northern Shortgrass Prairies have a semi-arid climate, with annual average precipitation ranging from 270mm to 450mm. Winters here are cold, with a mean winter temperature of −10 °C (14 °F), but chinook winds, most common in the western part of the region, closest to the Rocky Mountains, ameliorate the cold temporarily when they pass over. Summers range from warm to hot, with a mean temperature of 16 °C (61 °F).

== Flora ==
Dominant grasses include blue grama, needlegrass and spear grass. Big sagebrush is common in the southern and western regions, but almost non-existent in the north, northeast and east, where silver sagebrush is very common. Prickly pear and yellow cactus can be found in drier areas, especially in the badlands areas that can be found across the ecoregion. In the wettest areas, along water bodies, plains cottonwood, trembling aspen, willows and other trees can be found, along with various aquatic plants.

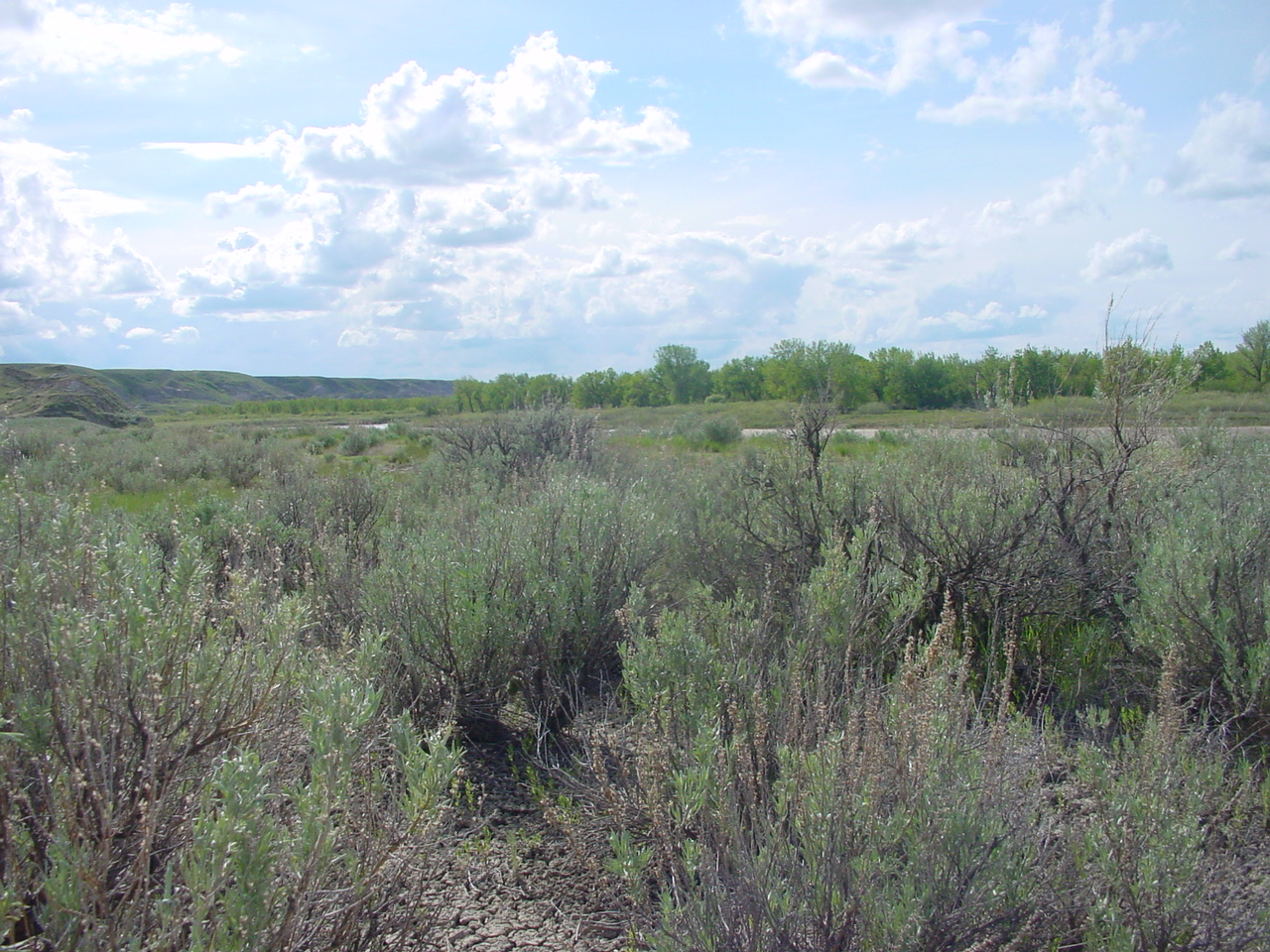
Silver sagebrush and plains cottonwood along the Red Deer River in Dinosaur Provincial Park, Alberta.

== Fauna ==
The Northern Shortgrass Prairies were once home to vast herds of bison, and some can still be found in places such as Grasslands National Park in southwestern Saskatchewan, and on private ranches. Pronghorn can be found in great numbers in much of the region, benefiting greatly from conservation measures. Mule deer are very common, and white-tailed deer somewhat less so.

Despite various intense pest control measures, immense colonies of Richardson's ground squirrels still remain, though the black-tailed prairie dog is much less common than before European settlement. The steppe here was once home to elk and grizzly bears, but these species have been extirpated from the plains.

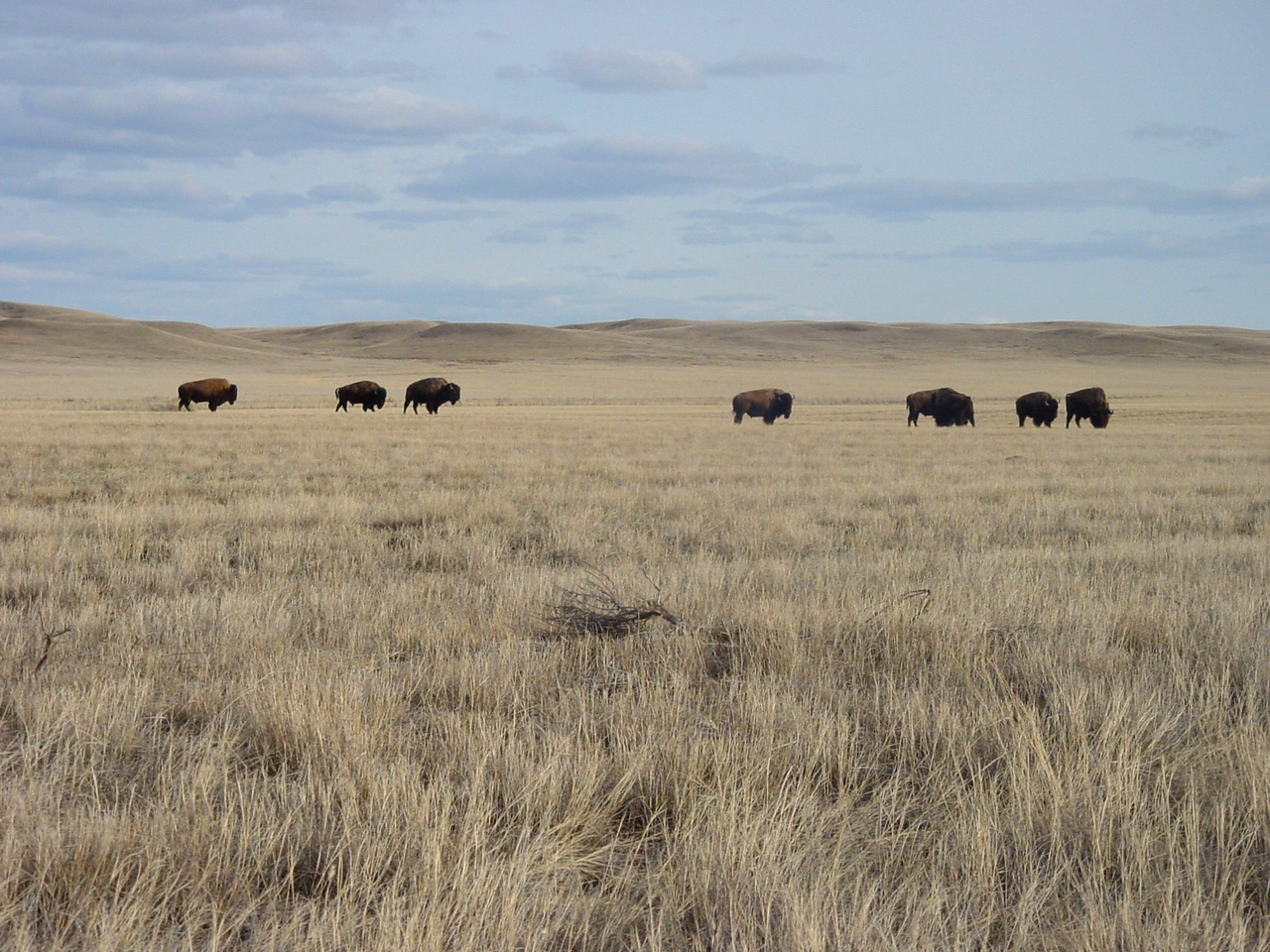
Bison in Grasslands National Park, Saskatchewan.

== See also ==
- Shortgrass prairie
- List of ecoregions in Canada (WWF)
- List of ecoregions in the United States (WWF)
- Palliser's Triangle, which includes the Canadian portion of this ecoregion
- American Prairie (nature reserve)
