= Colorado Rockies forests =

Temperate coniferous forests ecoregion of the United States

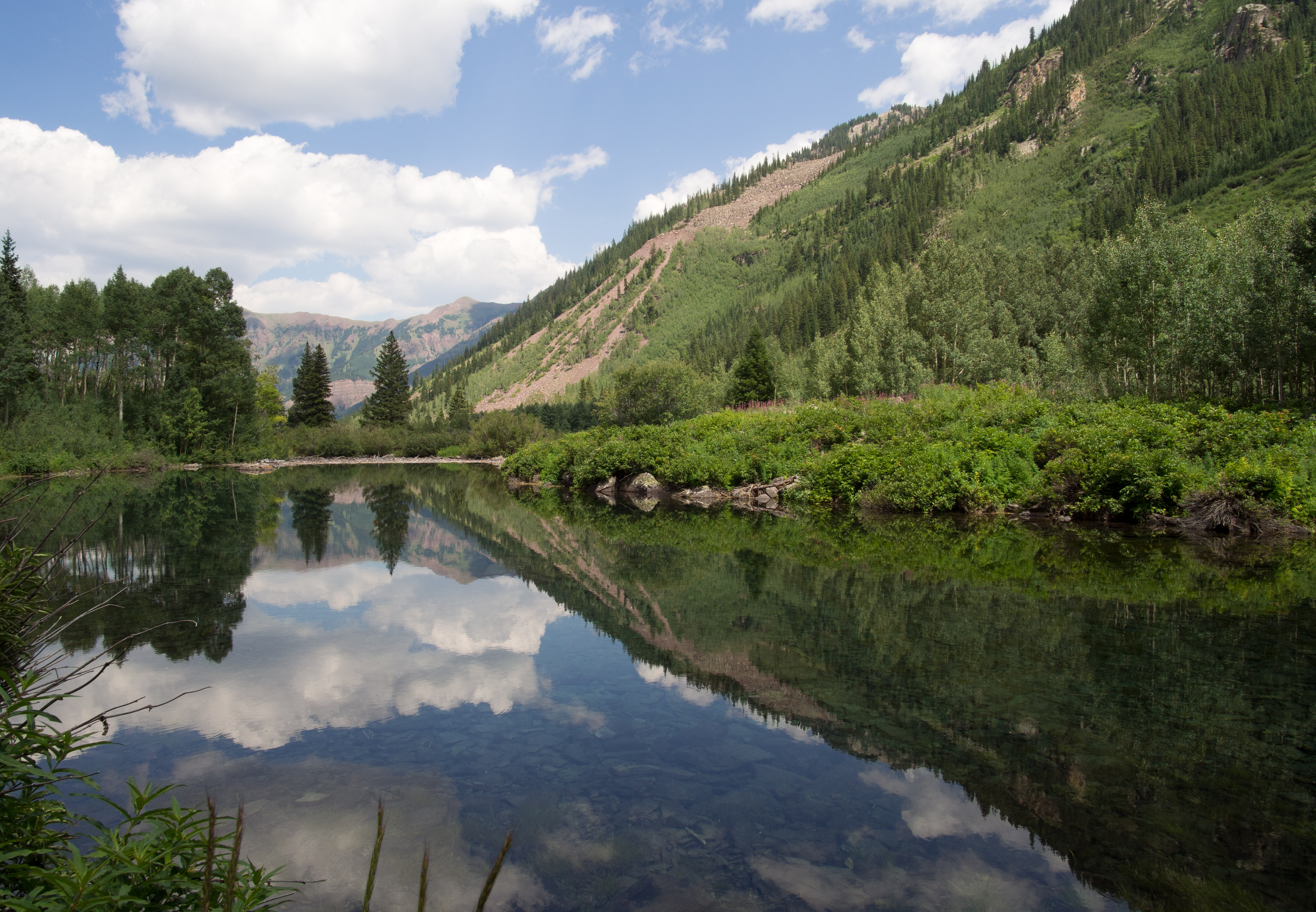
- Forest and lake in the Elk Mountains, Colorado

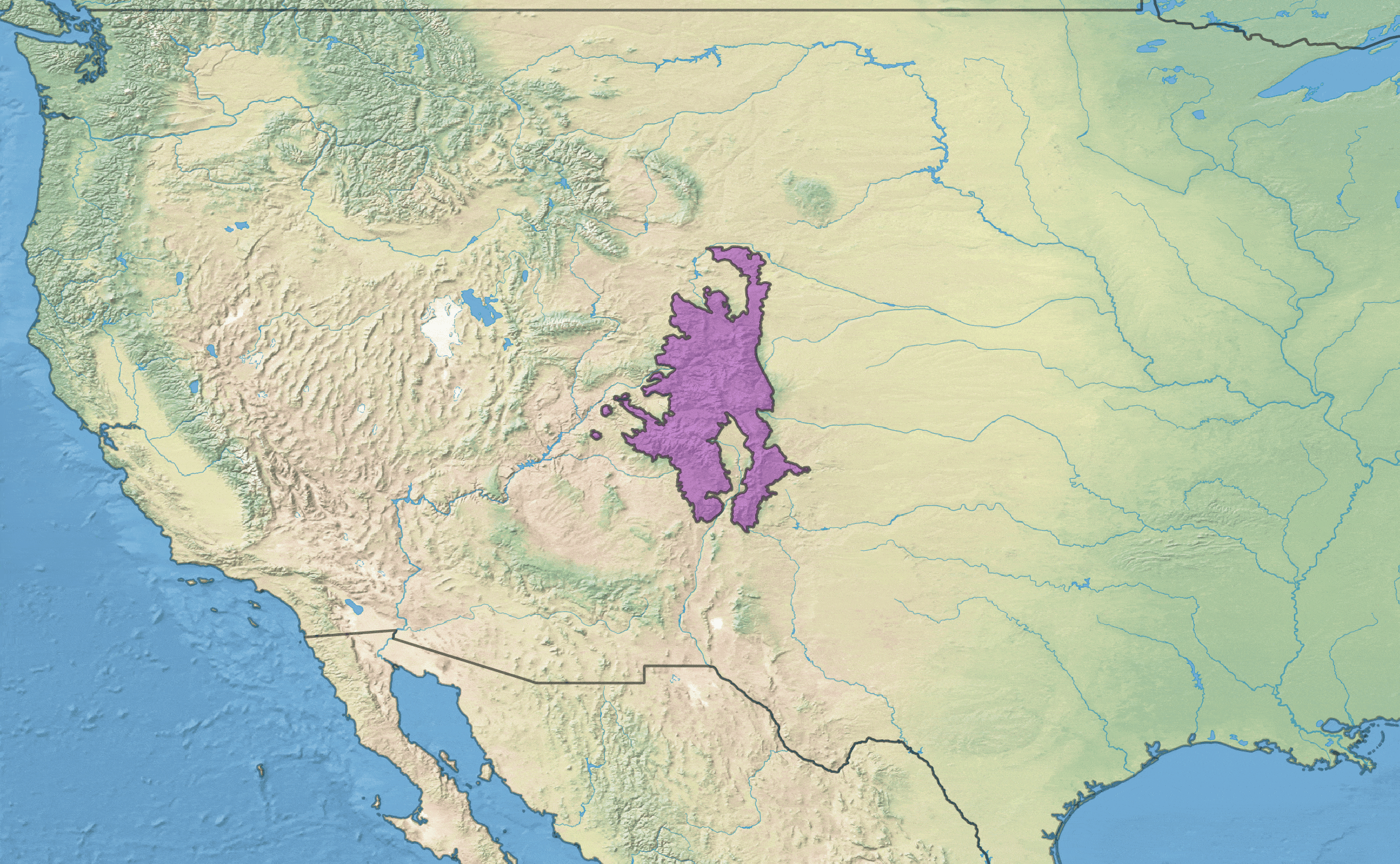
- Map of Colorado Rockies forests

Ecology
- Realm: Nearctic
- Biome: Temperate coniferous forest
- Borders: Colorado Plateau shrublands; Northern short grasslands; Western short grasslands; Wyoming Basin shrub steppe
- Bird species: 210
- Mammal species: 103

Geography
- Country: United States
- States: Wyoming; Colorado; New Mexico

Conservation
- Habitat loss: 1.2653%
- Protected: 65.39%

The Colorado Rockies forests is a temperate coniferous forest ecoregion of the United States. This ecoregion is located in the highest ranges of the Southern Rocky Mountains, in central and western Colorado, northern New Mexico and southeastern Wyoming, and experiences a dry continental climate. This ecoregion is the same as the Southern Rockies ecoregion in the EPA classification scheme from Omernik.

== Flora ==
The dominant vegetation type of this ecoregion is coniferous forest. In contrast with Rocky Mountain ecoregions to the north, lodgepole pine is rather rare, replaced by ponderosa pine and quaking aspen. Rocky Mountain Douglas-fir, Engelmann spruce, subalpine fir, limber pine and Gambel oak can also be found in the mountain forests. Bristlecone pine is the dominant plant at the tree line/krummholz zone. Aside from coniferous forests, the ecoregion contains meadows, foothill grasslands, riparian woodlands and alpine tundra.

== Fauna ==
Mammals include elk, mule deer, black bear, mountain lions, wolverine, Canada lynx, and American marten. Grizzly bears may exist in this region but there has not been a confirmed sighting of a grizzly in Colorado since 1979. Many bird species are found in this region, including white-tailed ptarmigan, western tanagers, dusky grouse, mountain chickadees, pine grosbeaks, Canada jays, pygmy nuthatches, red crossbills, Clark's nutcrackers, American dippers, and Townsend's solitaires. Raptors include red-tailed hawks and great horned owls.

== Threats and preservation ==
While this ecoregion is listed as "relatively stable/intact", it is threatened by logging, mining, oil and gas development, recreational-residential construction, domestic livestock grazing and introduction of exotic species. Protected areas include Rocky Mountain National Park and Indian Peaks Wilderness in north-central Colorado, South San Juan Wilderness in south-central Colorado, and parts of the Sangre de Cristo Mountains extending into north-central New Mexico.

== See also ==
- List of ecoregions in the United States (WWF)
- Rocky Mountains
- Rocky Mountain ponderosa pine forest
- Rocky Mountains subalpine zone
- Front Range
