= Southern Great Lakes forests =

Temperate broadleaf and mixed forests ecoregion of Canada and the United States

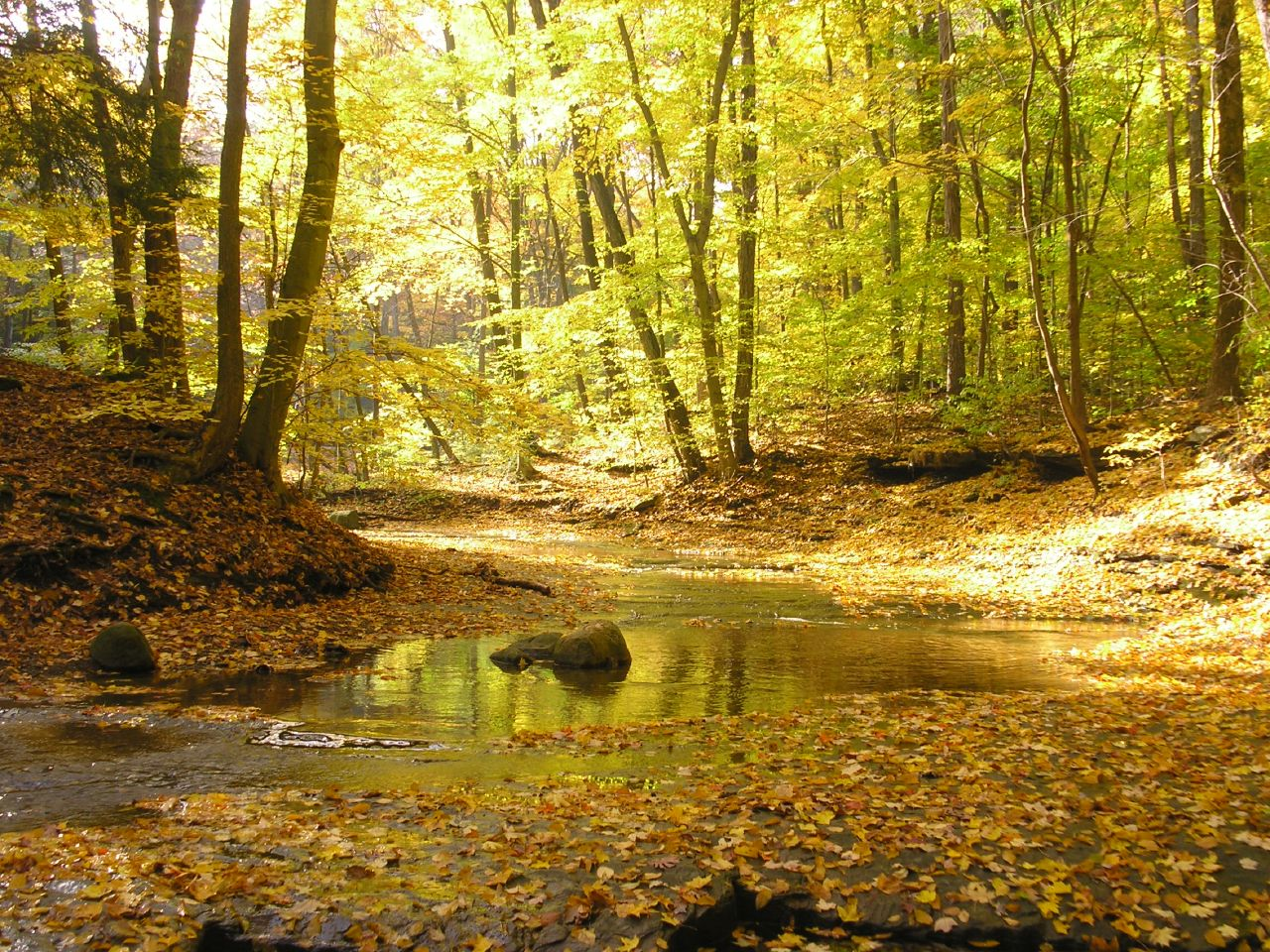
- South Chagrin River near Cleveland, Ohio

Ecology
- Realm: Nearctic
- Biome: Temperate broadleaf and mixed forests
- Borders: List: Eastern Great Lakes lowland forests; Allegheny Highlands forests; Appalachian mixed mesophytic forests; Central U.S. hardwood forests; Central forest-grasslands transition; Western Great Lakes forests; Upper Midwest forest-savanna transition
- Bird species: 220
- Mammal species: 56

Geography
- Area: 244,500 km^{2} (94,400 mi^{2})
- Countries: United States; Canada
- States/Provinces: Michigan; New York; Ohio; Ontario; Pennsylvania; Indiana
- Climate type: Humid continental (Dfa and Dfb)

Conservation
- Conservation status: Critical/Endangered
- Habitat loss: 99%

The Southern Great Lakes lowland forests is a temperate broadleaf and mixed forest ecoregion of North America, as defined by the World Wildlife Fund. Located near the Great Lakes, it lies mostly in the central northeastern United States and extends into southeast central Canada. In modern times, little of it remains intact due to land use, including agriculture and urban uses.

== Setting ==
This area includes the southern half of Michigan's Lower Peninsula, and much of Indiana and Ohio. It also extends through the southern half of Southwest Ontario from Windsor to Toronto and into Pennsylvania and New York on the southern rims of lakes Erie and Ontario.

This region is characterized by warm-to-hot summers and mild-to-cold, snowy winters.

== Flora ==
This ecoregion is associated with the temperate deciduous forest with the forest being dominated by Acer rubrum, Acer saccharum and Fagus grandifolia, Prunus serotina, Carya ovata, Quercus alba, and Quercus rubra. Other trees that may be found in the forest include Fraxinus americana, Liriodendron tulipifera, Cornus florida, Sassafras albidum, Juglans nigra, Tsuga canadensis, and Juniperus virginiana. Pure stands of Pinus strobus are sometimes common. In riparian environments Morus rubra and Fraxinus pennsylvanica can be found, though in dwindling numbers, due to Morus alba hybridization, and the emerald ash borer respectively. In more marshy areas, Populus deltoides, Populus tremuloides, Nyssa sylvatica, Betula populifolia, Betula nigra, Larix laricina, and Thuja occidentalis are common.

== Fauna ==
The Southern Great Lakes forests were very rich in wildlife. Birds include cardinals, downy woodpecker, wood duck and eastern screech owl. Large mammals including American black bear (Ursus americanus), moose (Alces alces), Canada lynx (Lynx canadensis), cougar (Puma concolor), caribou (Rangifer tarandus), elk (Cervus canadensis) and eastern wolf (Canis lycaon) have been mostly or completely extirpated from this ecoregion; remaining mammals include white-tailed deer (Odocoileus virginianus), coyote (Canis latrans), snowshoe hare (Lepus americanus), eastern chipmunk (Tamias striatus), American red squirrel (Tamiasciurus hudsonicus) and eastern gray squirrel (Sciurus carolinensis).

== Threats and preservation ==
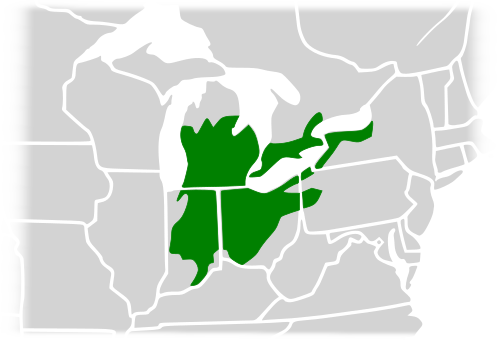
Detailed map of the Southern Great Lakes forests

Because of extensive urbanization and agricultural use very little of this habitat remains intact.

== See also ==
- List of ecoregions in Canada (WWF)
- List of ecoregions in the United States (WWF)
