= Eastern Great Lakes lowland forests =

Temperate broadleaf and mixed forest ecoregion of Canada and the United States

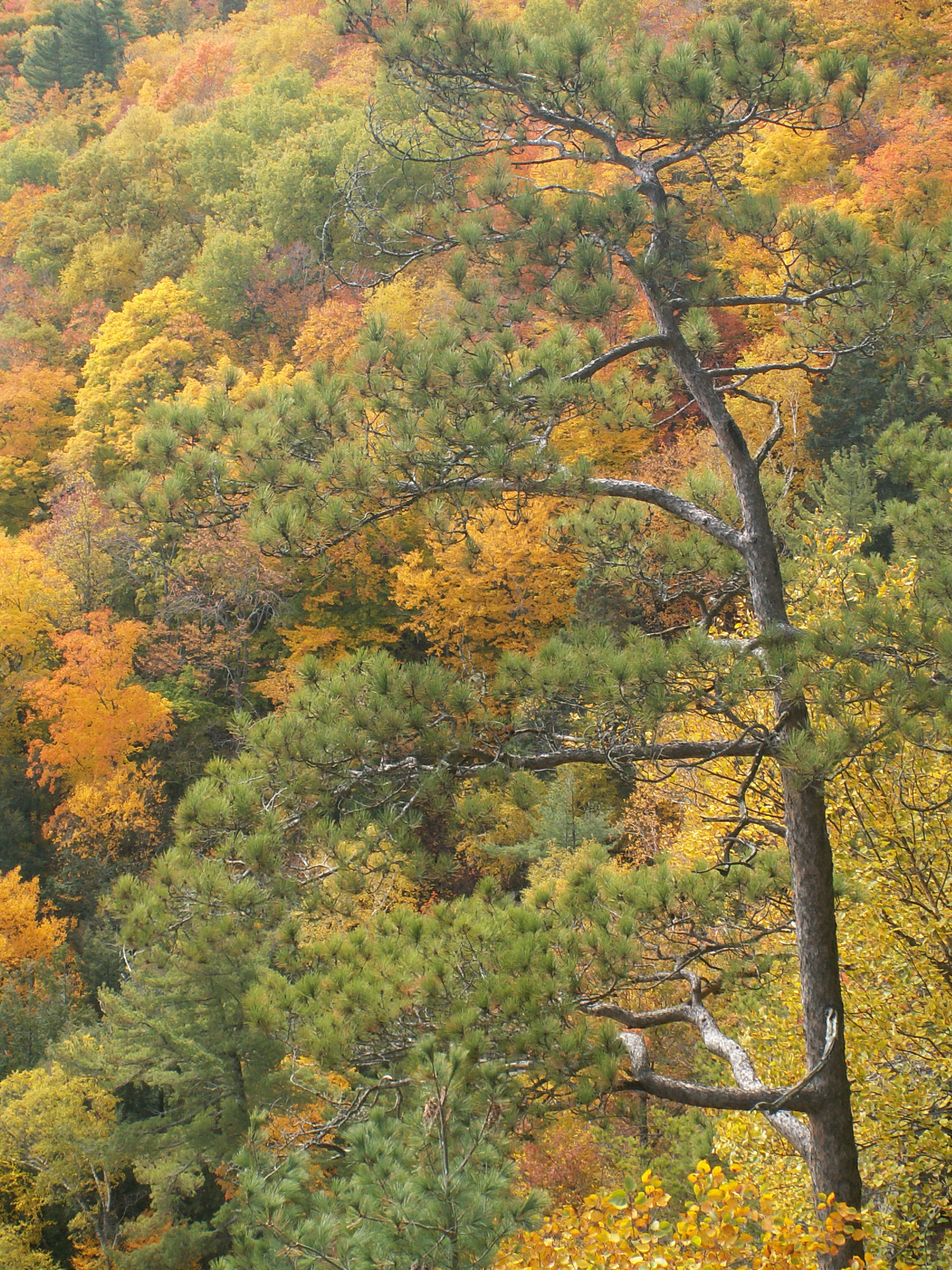
- Cap Tourmente National Wildlife Area in Quebec in fall

Ecology
- Realm: Nearctic
- Biome: Temperate broadleaf and mixed forests
- Borders: List: Eastern forest-boreal transition; New England-Acadian forests; Northeastern coastal forests; Allegheny Highlands forests; Southern Great Lakes forests
- Bird species: 220
- Mammal species: 56

Geography
- Area: 116,400 km^{2} (44,900 mi^{2})
- Countries: Canada; United States
- States/Provinces: New York; Ontario; Quebec; Vermont
- Climate type: Humid continental (Dfa and Dfb)

Conservation
- Conservation status: Critical/Endangered
- Habitat loss: 54.4%
- Protected: 2.23%

The Eastern Great Lakes lowland forests is a temperate broadleaf and mixed forest ecoregion of North America, as defined by the World Wildlife Fund. It lies mostly in south and eastern Ontario and Quebec in Canada, and Upstate New York and Vermont in the United States.

== Setting ==
This area includes much of northern New York state (save for the Adirondacks), western Vermont, the Saint Lawrence Lowlands in southern Quebec and most of southern Ontario between Lake Ontario and Georgian Bay on Lake Huron. The region includes the Frontenac Axis, the Niagara Escarpment up to Manitoulin Island on Lake Huron, and Lake Simcoe. Meanwhile, the forests south of Lake Ontario are classified as the Southern Great Lakes forests ecoregion and in Canada the higher elevations of the Canadian Appalachian Mountains and the Laurentian Mountains constitute the Eastern Canadian forests.

This region has warm summers and cold, snowy winters.

== Flora ==
This ecoregion is a transition area between the taiga to the north and the temperate deciduous forest to the south and thus contains a variety of habitats including freshwater marshes, dunes, bogs, fens, and hardwood and conifer swamps. Trees of the woodland include eastern hemlock, Eastern white pine, Red pine, White spruce, Black spruce, Balsam fir, and hardwoods White oak, Northern red oak, American beech, Sugar maple, Yellow birch, Paper birch and Quaking aspen. Particular areas include the oak/pitch pine mix of the Albany Pine Bush, areas of dry rocky alvar plain, and the white cedars of the Niagara Escarpment.

== Fauna ==
The Eastern Great Lakes lowland forests are very rich in wildlife. Birds include cardinals, downy woodpecker, wood duck and eastern screech owl. Large mammals including Canada lynx (Lynx canadensis), cougar (Puma concolor), caribou (Rangifer tarandus), wolverine (Gulo gulo), elk (Cervus canadensis) and eastern wolf (Canis lycaon) have been completely extirpated from this ecoregion; remaining mammals include white-tailed deer (Odocoileus virginianus), American black bear (Ursus americanus), coyote (Canis latrans), moose (Alces alces), snowshoe hare (Lepus americanus), eastern chipmunk (Tamias striatus), bobcat (Lynx rufus), American red squirrel (Tamiasciurus hudsonicus) and eastern gray squirrel (Sciurus carolinensis).

== Threats and preservation ==
The Saint Lawrence River is one of the most polluted in the world, and these surrounding forests are vulnerable to clearance for agriculture and urban development including the cities of Montreal, Ottawa, Quebec City and suburbs of Toronto, Syracuse and Albany, New York. Less than 5% of natural forest remains intact.

The fragmented blocks of remaining habitat include: the eastern end of Lake Ontario; Missisquoi National Wildlife Refuge in Vermont; the Chaumont Barrens, Rome Sand Plains, the Albany Pine Bush and the proposed Split Rock Wildway in New York; Bruce Peninsula (the barrier between Georgian Bay and the main section of Lake Huron), Alfred Bog, Luther Marsh, the Ganaraska Forest and Carden Plain in Ontario; and Mont Saint-Hilaire, Lac Saint-François National Wildlife Area and Cap Tourmente National Wildlife Areas in Quebec.

== See also ==
- List of ecoregions in Canada (WWF)
- List of ecoregions in the United States (WWF)

== References and external links ==
- "Eastern Great Lakes Lowland Forests". Terrestrial Ecoregions. World Wildlife Fund.
- World Wildlife Fund, ed. (2001). "Eastern Great Lakes Lowland Forests". WildWorld Ecoregion Profile. National Geographic Society. Archived from the original on 2010-03-08.
