= Colorado Plateau shrublands =

Xeric shrubland ecoregion of the western United States

- Landscape Arch in the Arches National Park

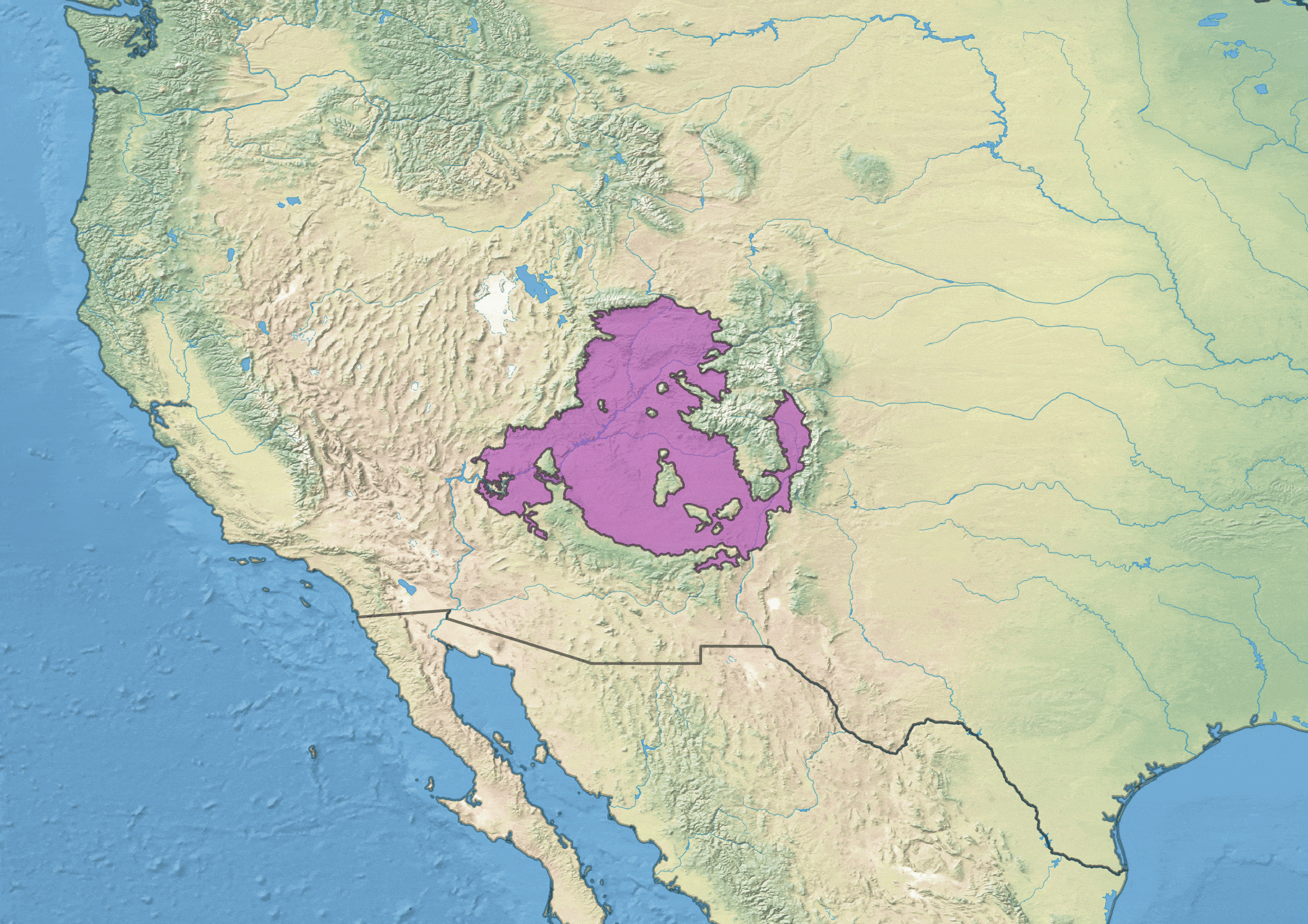
- Map of Colorado Plateau shrublands

Ecology
- Realm: Nearctic
- Biome: deserts and xeric shrublands
- Borders: List: Arizona Mountains forests; Chihuahuan Desert; Colorado Rockies forests; Mojave Desert; Wasatch and Uinta montane forests; Western shortgrass prairie, Wyoming Basin shrub steppe

Geography
- Area: 283,435 km^{2} (109,435 mi^{2})
- Countries: United States
- States: Arizona; Colorado; New Mexico; Utah
- Climate type: Cold desert (BWk) and cold semi-arid (BSk)

Conservation
- Conservation status: Relatively stable/intact
- Protected: 33,203 km^{2} (12%)

The Colorado Plateau shrublands is an ecoregion of deserts and xeric shrublands in the Western United States.

== Geography ==
The Colorado Plateau shrublands occupy the Colorado Plateau. They lie mostly in the basin of the upper Colorado River, and reach into the upper basin of the Rio Grande.

== Flora ==
The main plant communities, or zones, are woodlands, mountain woodlands, and grassland and shrub.

The woodland zone, or pinyon-juniper woodland, covers the largest area. It consists of open woodlands of short trees, mostly pinyon pine (Pinus edulis throughout the ecoregion, and Pinus monophylla subsp. fallax in the southwestern portion of the ecoregion) and species of juniper (Juniperus spp.). The ground is covered by sparse grasses, including grama and other grasses, herbs, and shrubs such as big sagebrush (Artemisia tridentata) and alder-leaf mountain mahogany (Cercocarpus montanus).

Arid grasslands occupy lowland areas. Grasses, sagebrush, and shrubs predominate, with areas of bare soil, and including cacti and yucca in the warmest areas.

The mountain zone includes the high plateaus and mountains. It is made up of woodlands and forests, chiefly ponderosa pine (Pinus ponderosa) in the south and lodgepole pine (Pinus contorta var. latifolia) and quaking aspen (Populus tremuloides) to the north.

== Fauna ==
Large mammals include mule deer (Odocoileus hemionus), cougar (Puma concolor), coyote (Canis latrans), bobcat (Lynx rufus), and gray fox (Urocyon cinereoargenteus). Rocky Mountain elk (Cervus canadensis nelsoni) are found in some areas. Pronghorn (Antilocapra americana) are the predominant large mammal of the arid grasslands. Smaller mammals include the North American porcupine (Erethizon dorsatum), black-tailed jackrabbit (Lepus californicus), mountain cottontail (Sylvilagus nuttallii), Colorado chipmunk (Neotamias quadrivittatus), cliff chipmunk (Neotamias dorsalis), rock squirrel (Otospermophilus variegatus), Bushy-tailed woodrat (Neotoma cinerea), and white-footed mouse (Peromyscus leucopus). The ringtail (Bassariscus astutus) and western spotted skunk (Spilogale gracilis) are uncommonly found.

The most common resident birds are the American bushtit (Psaltriparus minimus), pinyon jay (Gymnorhinus cyanocephalus), Woodhouse's scrub jay (Aphelocoma woodhouseii), juniper titmouse (Baeolophus ridgwayi), western red-shafted flicker (Colaptes auratus cafer), rock wren (Salpinctes obsoletus), black-chinned hummingbird (Archilochus alexandri), red-tailed hawk (Buteo jamaicensis), and golden eagle (Aquila chrysaetos). Summer-resident birds include the chipping sparrow (Spizella passerina), common nighthawk (Chordeiles minor), black-throated gray warbler (Setophaga nigrescens), American cliff swallow (Petrochelidon pyrrhonota), lark sparrow (Chondestes grammacus), and mourning dove (Zenaida macroura). Common winter-resident birds are the pink-sided junco (Junco hyemalis mearnsi), Shufeldt's junco (Junco hyemalis shufelti), gray-headed junco (Junco hyemalis caniceps), red-backed junco (Junco hyemalis dorsalis), Rocky Mountain nuthatch (Sitta carolinensis nelsoni), mountain bluebird (Sialia currucoides), American robin (Turdus migratorius), and Steller's jay (Cyanocitta stelleri).

Reptiles include the greater short-horned lizard (Phrynosoma hernandesi) and western rattlesnake (Crotalus viridis).

== Protected areas ==
A 2017 assessment found that 33,203 km^{2}, or 12%, of the ecoregion is in protected areas. Protected areas include Arches National Park, Canyonlands National Park, Grand Staircase–Escalante National Monument, Grand Canyon–Parashant National Monument, Dominguez–Escalante National Conservation Area, Petrified Forest National Park, and El Malpais National Conservation Area.

== Ecoregion delineation ==
The Colorado Plateau shrublands ecoregion defined by the World Wildlife Fund corresponds closely to the Colorado Plateaus and Arizona/New Mexico Plateau ecoregions delineated by James M. Omernik for the US Environmental Protection Agency.

== See also ==
- List of ecoregions in the United States (WWF)
