= Western short grasslands =

Temperate grasslands, savannas, and shrublands ecoregion of the United States

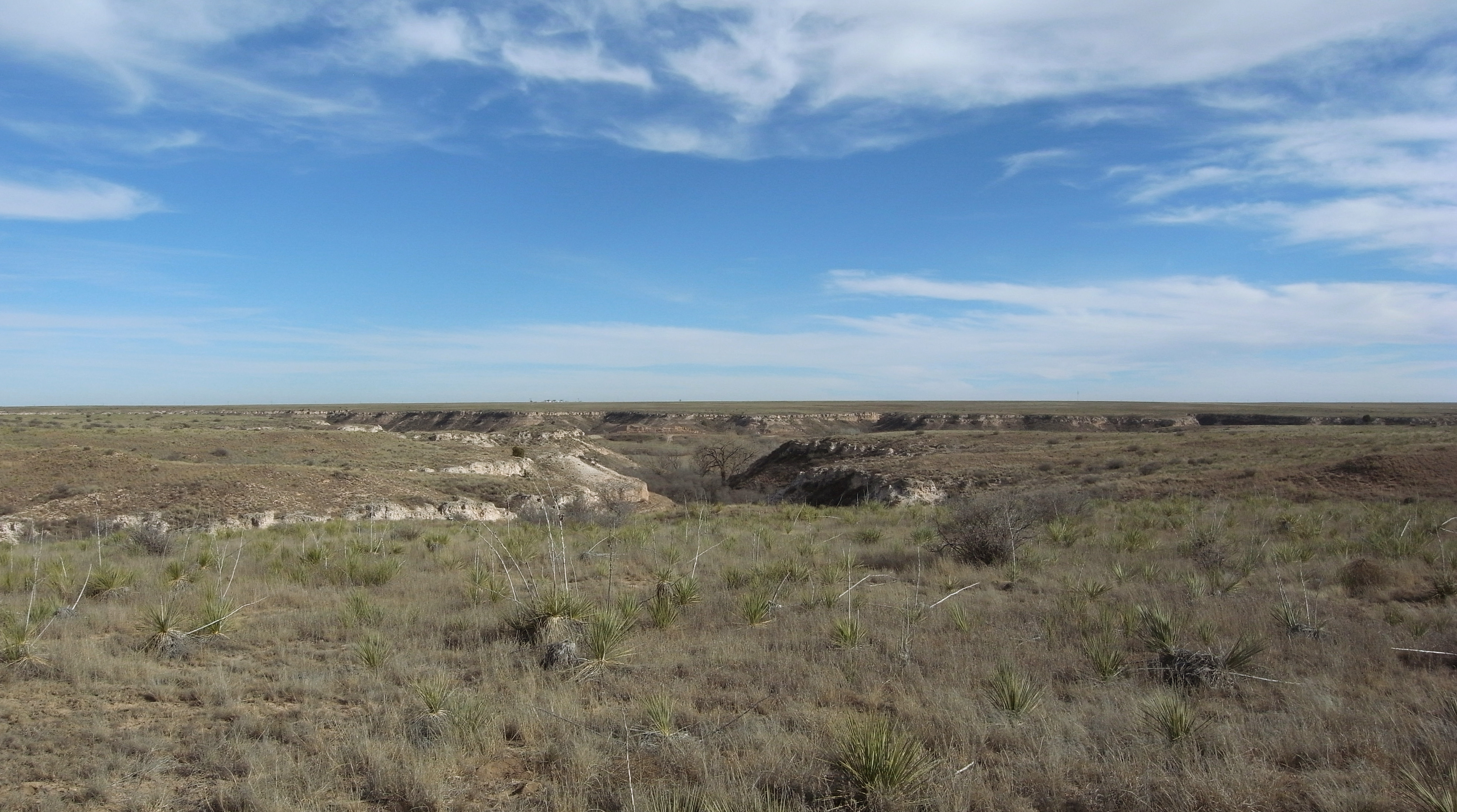
- Canyon in the shortgrass prairie of Buffalo Lake National Wildlife Refuge

Ecology
- Realm: Nearctic
- Biome: Temperate grasslands, savannas, and shrublands
- Borders: List: Central and Southern mixed grasslands; Chihuahuan Desert; Colorado Plateau shrublands; Colorado Rockies forests; Nebraska Sand Hills mixed grasslands; Northern short grasslands
- Bird species: 245
- Mammal species: 107

Geography
- Area: 435,200 km^{2} (168,000 sq mi)
- Country: United States
- States: South Dakota; Wyoming; Nebraska; Colorado; Kansas; New Mexico; Oklahoma; Texas
- Climate type: Cold semi-arid (BSk)

Conservation
- Habitat loss: 30.5%
- Protected: 5%

The Western short grasslands is a temperate grassland ecoregion of the United States.

== Setting ==
This ecoregion largely corresponds with the geographical region known as the High Plains. It is located in southeastern Wyoming, western Nebraska (the Nebraska Panhandle), eastern Colorado, western Kansas, western Oklahoma (the Oklahoma Panhandle), eastern New Mexico, the Texas Panhandle and parts of west-central Texas and a very small portion of southwestern South Dakota. The Western short grasslands are characterized by a semi-arid climate, with low precipitation, warm temperatures, and a long growing season relative to other Nearctic prairie ecoregions.

== Flora ==
The two dominant grasses of this ecoregion are blue grama (Bouteloua gracilis) and buffalograss (Bouteloua dactyloides).

== Fauna ==
Mammals of this ecoregion include bison (Bison bison bison), mule deer (Odocoileus hemonius) and coyote (Canis latrans). Birds include the lesser prairie-chicken, greater prairie-chicken, dickcissel and loggerhead shrike. This ecoregion is home to a very diverse assortment of butterflies, birds, and mammals, due in part to its proximity to the subtropics.

== Threats and preservation ==
Most of this ecoregion is occupied by farms and ranches, and cattle grazing has affected 75% of the Western short grasslands, particularly the southern portion. This overgrazing has led to an invasion of desert scrub plants from the southwest, such as mesquite. Despite this, 40% of the ecoregion is considered to be intact. Protected areas include Buffalo Lake National Wildlife Refuge, in the panhandle region of Texas, Cimarron National Grassland in southwestern Kansas, Rocky Mountain Arsenal National Wildlife Refuge in central Colorado and Pawnee National Grassland in northeastern/north-central Colorado.

== See also ==
- List of ecoregions in the United States (WWF)
- High Plains (United States)
- Shortgrass prairie
- Dust Bowl
- Great American Desert
