= Mid-Atlantic Bight =

Coastal region of the United States

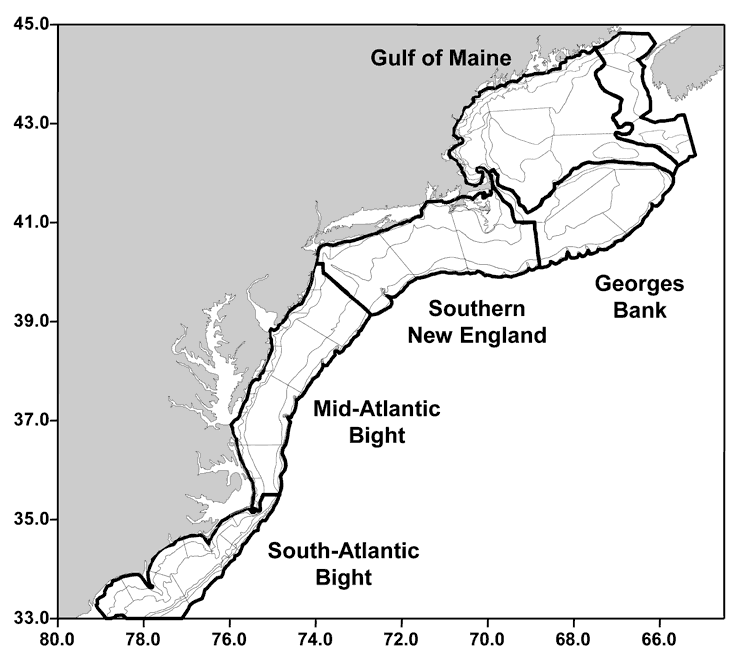
Map of the northwest Atlantic Ocean, including the Mid-Atlantic Bight.

The Mid-Atlantic Bight is a coastal region running from Massachusetts to North Carolina. It contains the New York Bight. It is separated from the South Atlantic Bight by Cape Hatteras to the south and the Gulf of Maine to the north by Cape Cod.
