= Mississippi lowland forests =

Temperate broadleaf and mixed forests ecoregion of the United States

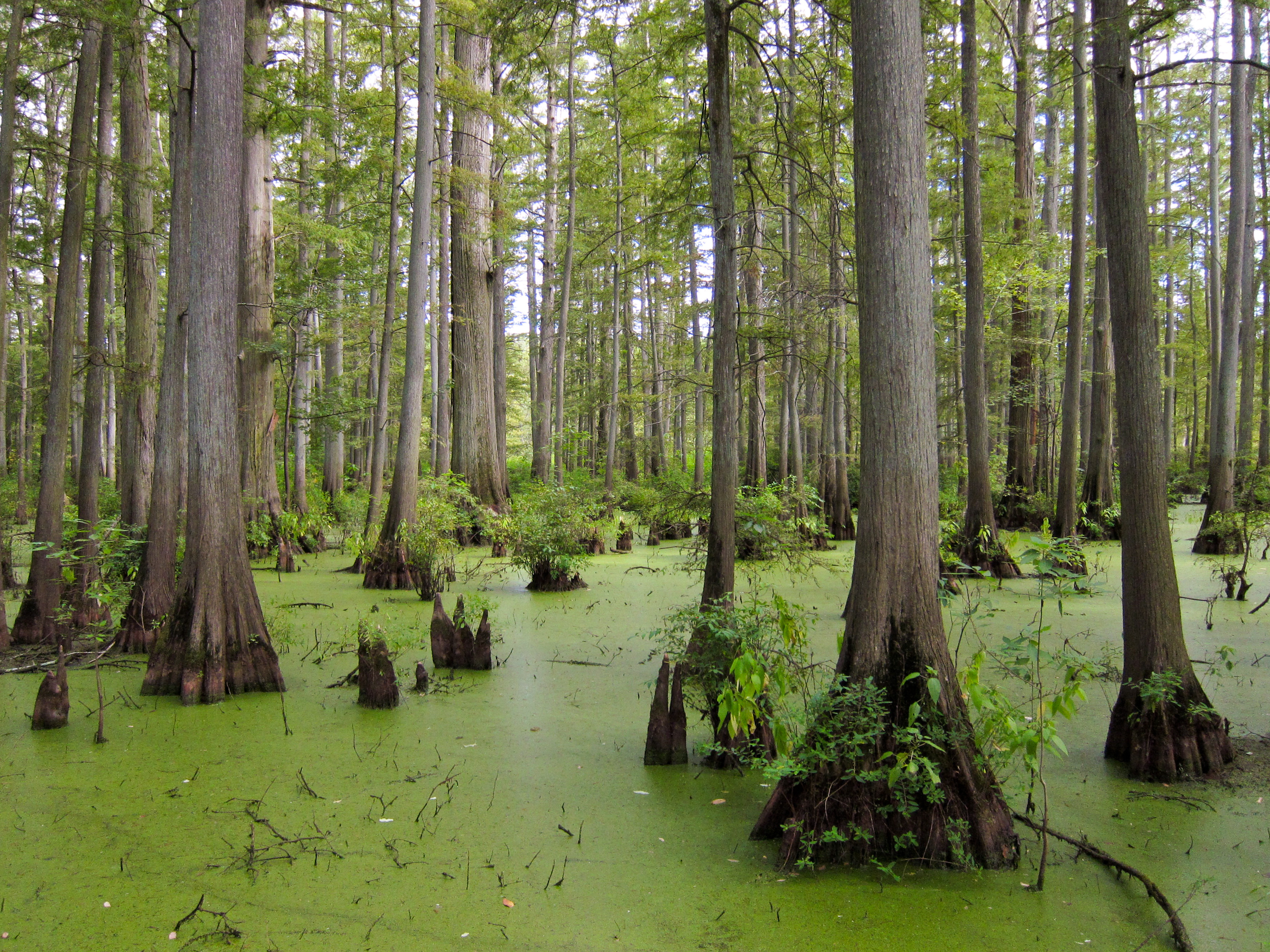
- Cache River State Natural Area, Illinois

Ecology
- Realm: Nearctic
- Biome: Temperate broadleaf and mixed forest
- Bird species: 222
- Mammal species: 62

Geography
- Area: 112,300 km^{2} (43,400 mi^{2})
- Country: United States
- Climate type: Humid subtropical (Cfa)

Conservation
- Habitat loss: 72.508%
- Protected: 5.21%

The Mississippi lowland forests are a temperate broadleaf and mixed forest ecoregion in the eastern United States, covering an area of 112,300 km^{2} (43,400 sq mi).

== Setting ==
Located on the Mississippi Alluvial Plain from Louisiana north to the southern edge of Illinois, the original forest cover of the Mississippi lowland forests was primarily bottomland hardwood forests, often subject to seasonal flooding which dictates the growth rate and composition. The forests historically occupied over 10,000,000 hectares of thick well-established forest of cypress (Taxodium spp.), hickory, oak and cedars similar to that found in the Middle Atlantic Coastal Forests region. However nearly all the original forest along the Mississippi has now been cleared. The Mississippi floodplain is distinct from the surrounding countryside which is higher and drier.

== Flora ==
The remaining woodlands are a mixture of Quercus virginiana, Juniperus virginiana, Magnolia grandiflora, Pinus elliottii, and Pinus glabra, along with a rich mixture of other trees including Taxodium distichum, Nyssa aquatica, Salix nigra, Carya aquatica, and Magnolia virginiana in the swampier areas. Sweetgum, American Sycamore, Swamp laurel oak, and Willow oak are common in seasonally saturated parts of these forests.

The Mississippi River is an important pathway and many of these species would have been carried and dispersed by the river system.

== Fauna ==
The forest was at one time host to forest interior species such as the ivory-billed woodpecker and the Mississippi is still an important migration route for many birds, including large numbers of wintering mallard ducks, wood ducks and hooded mergansers. Other birds of the area include many songbirds, bald eagles, herons and egrets.

== Ecological services ==
These forests provide several functions such as groundwater recharge, water quality enhancement through reduced turbidity, and flood flow alteration. They also contain a high degree of biodiversity. Estimates suggest aquatic food chains in bottomland forests can account for two to five times more wildlife species than upland forests. Flooded areas of the Mississippi lowland forest provide home to up to 40% of the continental mallard duck population during the winter months.

== Threats and preservation ==
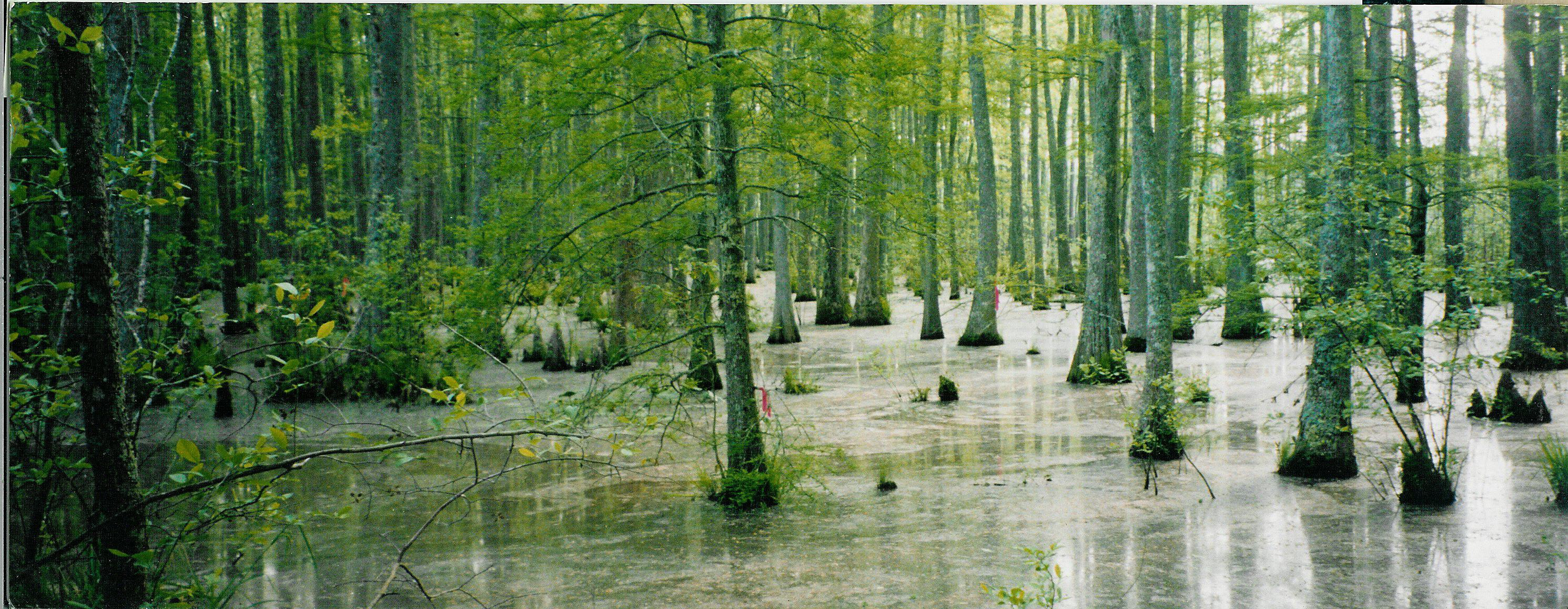
Bottomland hardwood swamp near Ashland, Mississippi.

Natural flooding is the primary form of disturbance in this ecoregion. Flood protection has reduced natural flooding by an estimated 50-90% degrading habitat for migratory birds. From the 1940s to the 1970s large parts of the forest were converted to agriculture, primarily for soybean production. Roughly 25% of the historically forested area remains. Calculations made in 2002 estimate that the region consists of 86,938 forest patches with an average size of 42 hectares. Fewer than 100 of these patches are thought to be large enough to support a self-sustaining population of forest breeding birds.

=== Significant natural areas in the ecoregion ===
The remaining unspoilt woodlands tend to be in the wettest areas such as the Cache River Wetlands in Illinois; Crowley's Ridge and Mingo National Wildlife Refuge in Missouri; White River National Wildlife Refuge in Arkansas; and Atchafalaya Basin and Big Woods Conservation Area in Louisiana.

== See also ==
- List of ecoregions in the United States (WWF)
