= Northern Tallgrass Prairie =

Ecoregion of Canada and the United States

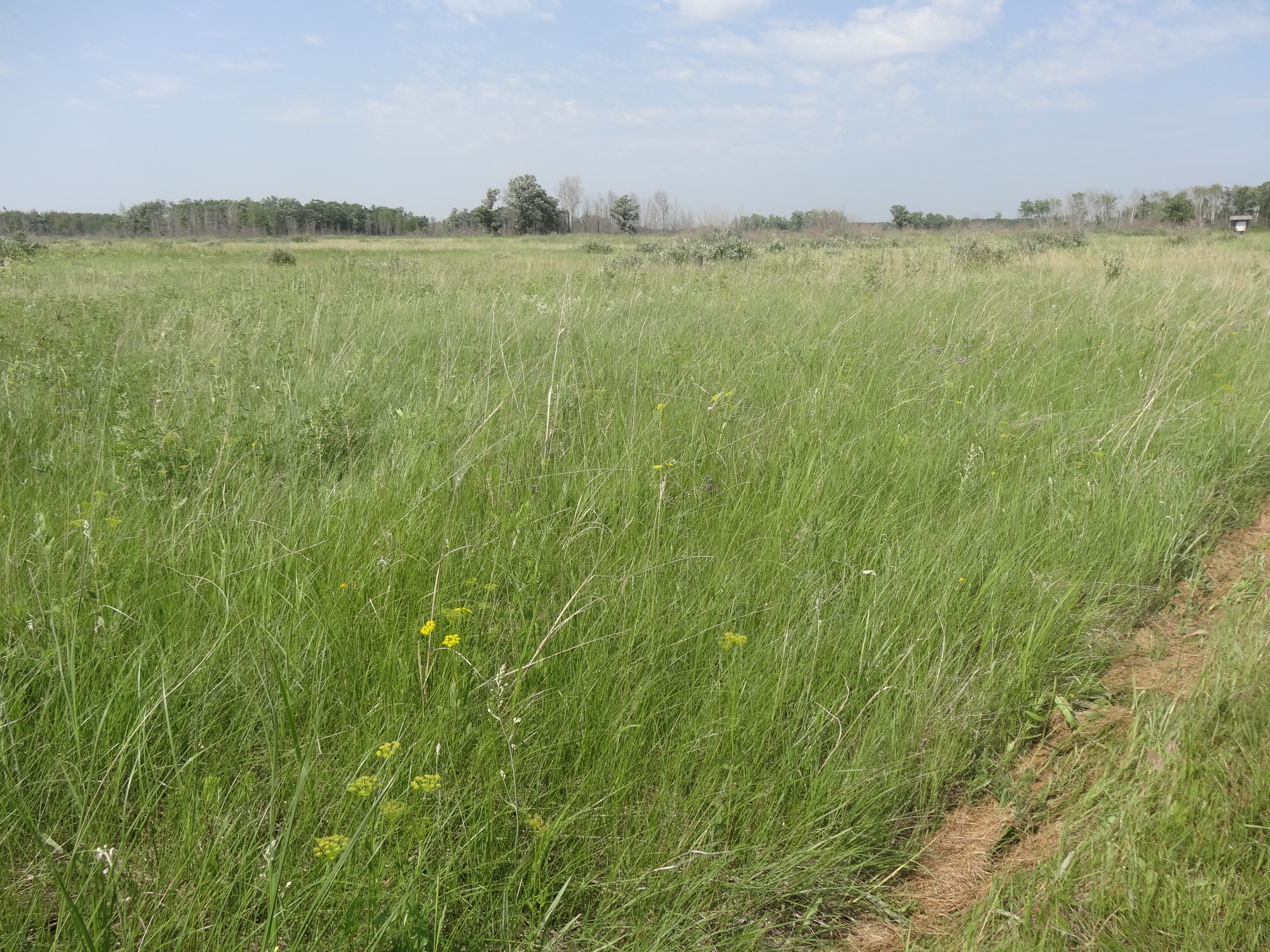
- Tall grasses of Manitoba Tall Grass Prairie Preserve

Ecology
- Realm: Nearctic
- Biome: Temperate grasslands, savannas, and shrublands
- Borders: List: Canadian aspen forests and parklands; Mid-Continental Canadian forests; Western Great Lakes forests; Upper Midwest forest-savanna transition; Central tall grasslands
- Bird species: 212
- Mammal species: 63

Geography
- Area: 76,000 km^{2} (29,000 mi^{2})
- Countries: United States; Canada
- States/Provinces: Minnesota; North Dakota; Manitoba
- Climate type: Humid continental (Dfb)

Conservation
- Conservation status: Critical/Endangered
- Global 200: Yes
- Habitat loss: 88.245%
- Protected: 4.21%

The Northern Tallgrass Prairie is one of 844 terrestrial ecoregions defined by One Earth. This ecoregion largely follows the Red River Valley in the Canadian province of Manitoba and the American states of North Dakota and Minnesota.

== Climate ==
The Northern Tallgrass Prairie has a humid continental climate with moderate precipitation, usually between 450-700mm. Winters here are very cold, with a mean winter temperature of −12.5 °C (9.5 °F), and summers are warm, with a mean temperature of 16 °C (61 °F). The ecoregion's mean annual temperature is 2.5 °C (36 °F).

== Flora ==
Dominant grasses include big bluestem (Andropogon gerardi), switchgrass (Panicum virgatum) and Indiangrass (Sorghastrum nutans). In wetter areas, trembling aspen (Populus tremuloides) and bur oak (Quercus macrocarpa) can be found.

== Fauna ==
Like other North American prairie ecoregions, the Northern tall grasslands once supported large herds of bison (Bison bison) and elk (Cervus canadensis), which were hunted by the gray wolf (Canis lupus) and coyote (Canis latrans). All of these save for the coyote have been largely eliminated from the region, though the bison and wolf are recovering. Other, more common species in the ecoregion include white-tailed deer (Odocoileus virginianus), rabbit (Sylvilagus spp.), ground squirrel (Spermophilus spp.) and large populations of waterfowl.

== Conservation ==
Some protected areas of this ecoregion include:

- Manitoba Tall Grass Prairie Preserve

== See also ==
- Tallgrass prairie
- List of ecoregions in Canada (WWF)
- List of ecoregions in the United States (WWF)
