= Upper Midwest forest–savanna transition =

Temperate broadleaf and mixed forests ecoregion of the United States

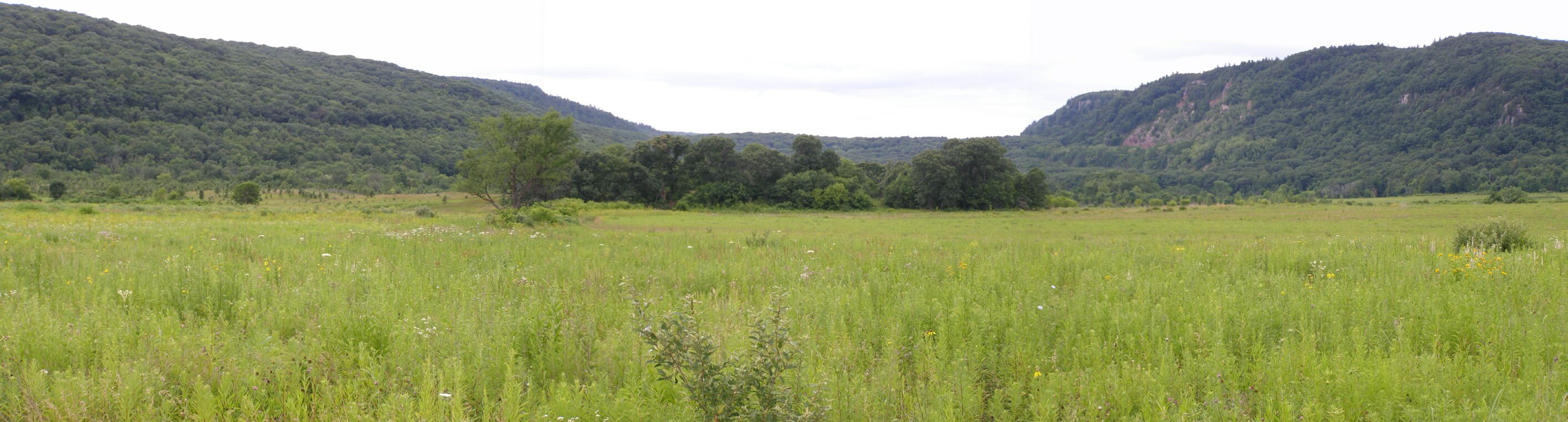
- Ecoregion Preserve (Devil's Lake State Park, Wisconsin)

Ecology
- Realm: Nearctic
- Biome: Temperate broadleaf and mixed forest
- Borders: List: Western Great Lakes forests; Southern Great Lakes forests; Central forest-grasslands transition; Central tall grasslands; Northern tall grasslands; Midwestern Canadian Shield forests
- Bird species: 215
- Mammal species: 62

Geography
- Area: 166,100 km^{2} (64,100 sq mi)
- Countries: United States; Canada
- States/Provinces: Minnesota; Wisconsin; Michigan; Iowa; Ontario; Manitoba
- Climate type: Humid continental (Dfa and Dfb)

Conservation
- Habitat loss: 62.5%
- Protected: 4.7%

The Upper Midwest forest–savanna transition is a terrestrial ecoregion that is defined by the World Wildlife Fund. An oak savanna plant community located in the Upper Midwest region of the United States, it is an ecotone (a transitional area) between the tallgrass prairies to the west and the temperate deciduous forests to the east. A part of the Upper Mississippi River basin, it is considered endangered with less than 5% of the original ecosystem remaining intact, due mostly to overgrazing and conversion to agriculture.

== Fire and disturbance ==
Historically, wildfire has been the primary driver and determinant of the forest dynamics in the plant community. Due to this the resulting canopy structure has been relatively sparse (the basal area ranges approximately from 4 to 29 meters hectare^{−1}). Presence and biodiversity of plant species is largely controlled by the frequency of fire. Typical tallgrass prairie vegetation such as grasses, forbs, shrubs, and sedges, increase with an increase in the amount of fire, whereas tree density and basal area decrease.

After European American settlement and the abandonment of fire as a land management regime, most savannas have been converted into closed canopy woodlands, with shade tolerant and fire-intolerant species dominating rather than the historic primary and secondary succession species dependent on fire.

== Species distribution ==
Trees:

- Quercus macrocarpa (Bur oak)
- Tilia americana (American basswood)
- Acer saccharum (Sugar maple)
- Quercus rubra (Red oak)

== Intact habitat ==
A survey in 1985 concluded that only 26 square kilometres (10 sq mi) of oak savanna remain, roughly 0.02% of what is estimated to have existed at the time of European settlement. Highly dispersed and fragmented, none of the present habitat falls under the designation of National Forests but comes under the administration of the states' Department of Natural Resources organizations or federal entities such as the Fish and Wildlife Service. Remaining intact habitat areas include:

- Devil's Lake State Park, on the Baraboo Range in south-central Wisconsin
- Savanna Army Depot in extreme northwestern Illinois
- Parts of the Upper Mississippi River National Wildlife and Fish Refuge in eastern Minnesota and western Wisconsin
- Richard J. Dorer Memorial Hardwood State Forest in the Driftless Area of southeastern Minnesota
- Whitewater State Park, also in the Driftless Area
- Necedah National Wildlife Refuge in central Wisconsin
- Horicon Marsh in southeastern Wisconsin
- Kettle Moraine State Forest in southeastern Wisconsin

== See also ==
- List of ecoregions in the United States (WWF)
- Western Great Lakes forests
- Cedar Creek Ecosystem Science Reserve – an ecological research station specializing in fire ecology and its effects on oak savannas run by the University of Minnesota
- Big Woods
- Oak savanna
