= Beringia lowland tundra =

Tundra ecoregion of Alaska, United States

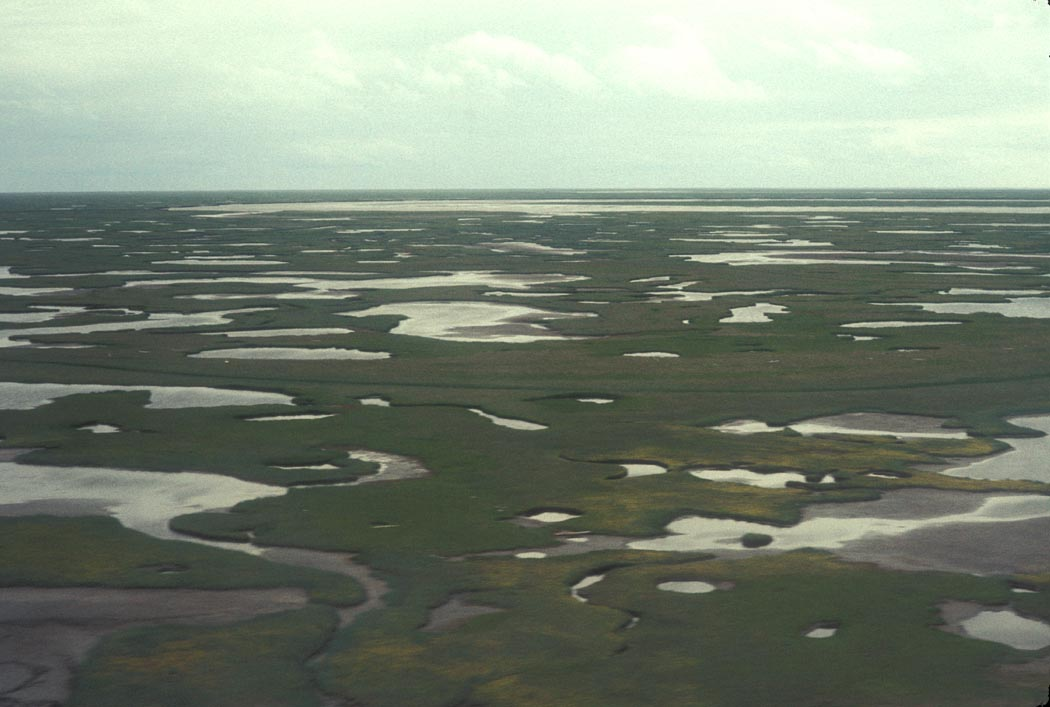
- The Kuskokwim Delta Wetlands

- 1106. Beringia lowland tundra

Ecology
- Realm: Nearctic
- Biome: Tundra
- Bird species: tundra swan, emperor goose, black brant, Steller's eider, bristle-thighed curlew, dotterel, bar-tailed godwit, Pacific golden plover, murre
- Mammal species: brown bear,

Geography
- Area: 150,900 km^{2} (58,300 mi^{2})
- Country: United States
- State: Alaska
- Geology: lowland
- Rivers: Kuskokwim River

Conservation
- Habitat loss: 0%
- Protected: 0%

The Beringia lowland tundra is a tundra ecoregion of North America, on the west coast of Alaska, mostly covered in wetland.

== Setting ==
These are areas of flat, wet, lowland on the Bering Sea coast of Alaska north as far as the Kotzebue Sound, and on the eastern coasts of the offshore St Lawrence Island and St. Matthew Island. Lakes and ponds cover almost a quarter of the area, and wetlands cover most of it. The southern Bristol Bay end of this coast receives much more rainfall than Kotzebue Sound in the north.

== Flora ==
These flat lands are mostly covered in sedges and grass with shrubland on the more sloping areas such as Bristol Bay. Sedge plants include Eriophorum angustifolium and Carex species, while the dominant shrubs are ericas such as crowberry (Empetrum nigrum).

== Fauna ==
Wildlife includes large colonies of seabirds on the islands and waterbirds and shorebirds in the many wetlands such as the Kuskokwim River delta, one of the largest waterbird nesting areas in the world and home to the world's largest communities of tundra swan, most of the world's emperor goose, and half of the world's black brant (Branta bernicla). The lagoon that forms the heart of Izembek National Wildlife Refuge on the Alaska Peninsula has also long been recognised as an important staging ground for migrating birds. Other birds of the coastal wetlands include bristle-thighed curlew, dotterel, bar-tailed godwit, and Pacific golden plover while seabirds of include Steller's eider and the large colonies of murre on the islands.

Mammals include North American river otter (Lontra canadensis), stoat (Mustela erminea), least weasel (Mustela nivalis), grizzly bear (Ursus arctos horribilis), Interior Alaskan wolf (Canis lupus pambasileus), Alaska moose (Alces alces gigas), and Porcupine caribou (Rangifer tarandus arcticus). One of the largest bear populations is found in Katmai National Park and Preserve and on Iliamna Lake.

== Threats and preservation ==
This ecoregion is almost intact apart from small fishing settlements on the coasts. Protected areas include: in the north the Bering Land Bridge National Preserve on the Seward Peninsula and Selawik National Wildlife Refuge; the Yukon Delta National Wildlife Refuge; and around Bristol Bay and on the Alaska Peninsula, Togiak National Wildlife Refuge on the north of the bay, Izembek National Wildlife Refuge, Alaska Peninsula National Wildlife Refuge along the southern coast of the peninsula, Becharof National Wildlife Refuge and Katmai National Park and Preserve. Also St. Matthew Island is one of the many that make up Alaska Maritime National Wildlife Refuge.

== See also ==
- List of ecoregions in the United States (WWF)
