= Ozark Mountain forests =

Ecoregion of Arkansas and Oklahoma, United States

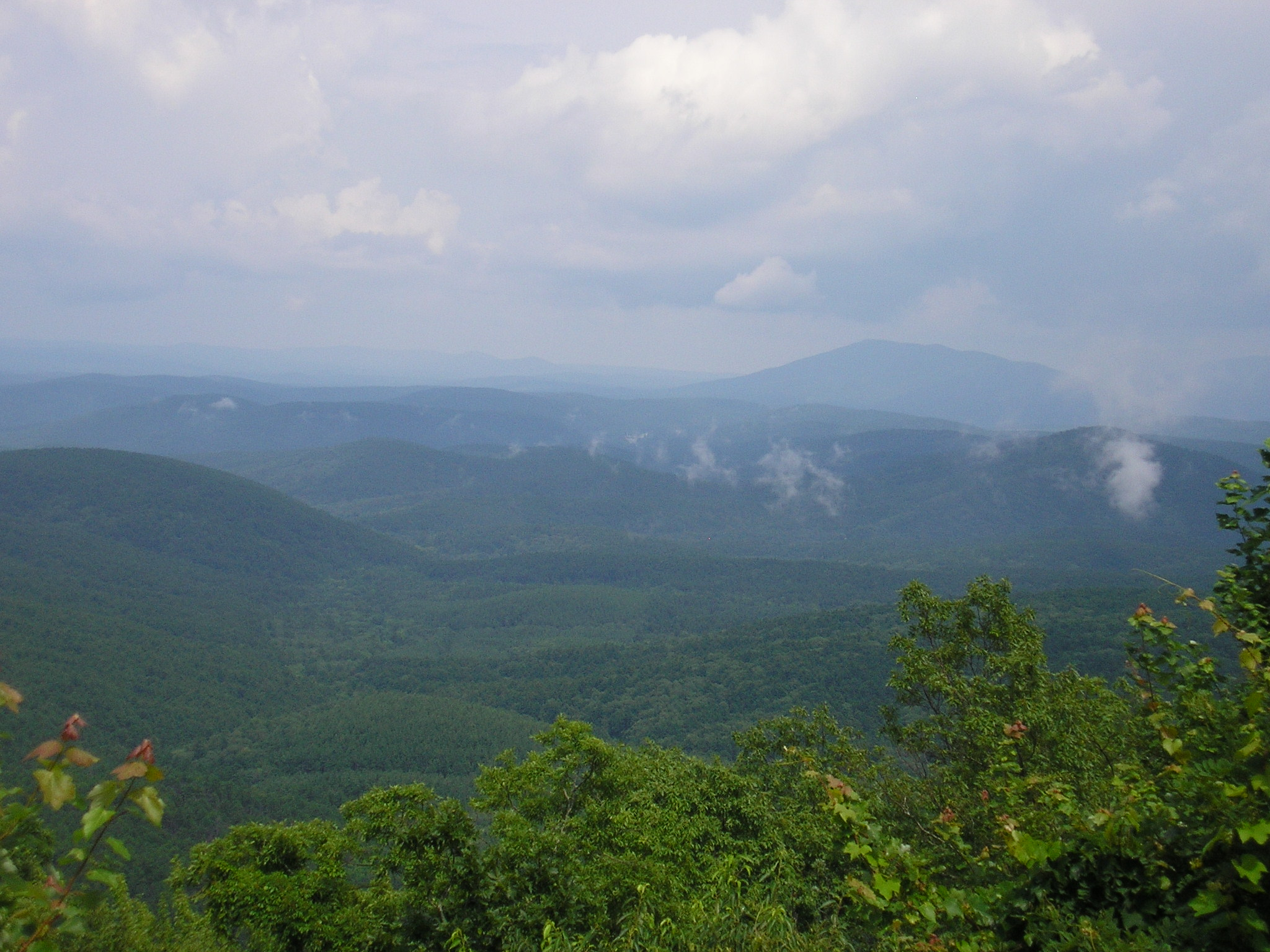
- Ouachita Mountains in Oklahoma

Ecology
- Realm: Nearctic
- Biome: Temperate broadleaf and mixed forests
- Bird species: 191
- Mammal species: 61

Geography
- Area: 62,000 km^{2} (24,000 mi^{2})
- Country: United States
- States: Arkansas; Oklahoma
- Coordinates: 35°N 94°W

Conservation
- Habitat loss: 25.522%
- Protected: 20.57%

The Ozark Mountain forests are a temperate broadleaf and mixed forests ecoregion in the central United States, delineated by the World Wide Fund for Nature. The ecoregion covers an area of 23,900 sq mi (62,000 km^{2}) in northern Arkansas and eastern Oklahoma.

The Boston Mountains and Ouachita Mountains are the main mountain ranges of the region.

== See also ==
- List of ecoregions in the United States (WWF)
- U.S. Interior Highlands
- Ozarks
- Ozark–St. Francis National Forest
- Ouachita Mountains
- Ouachita National Forest
