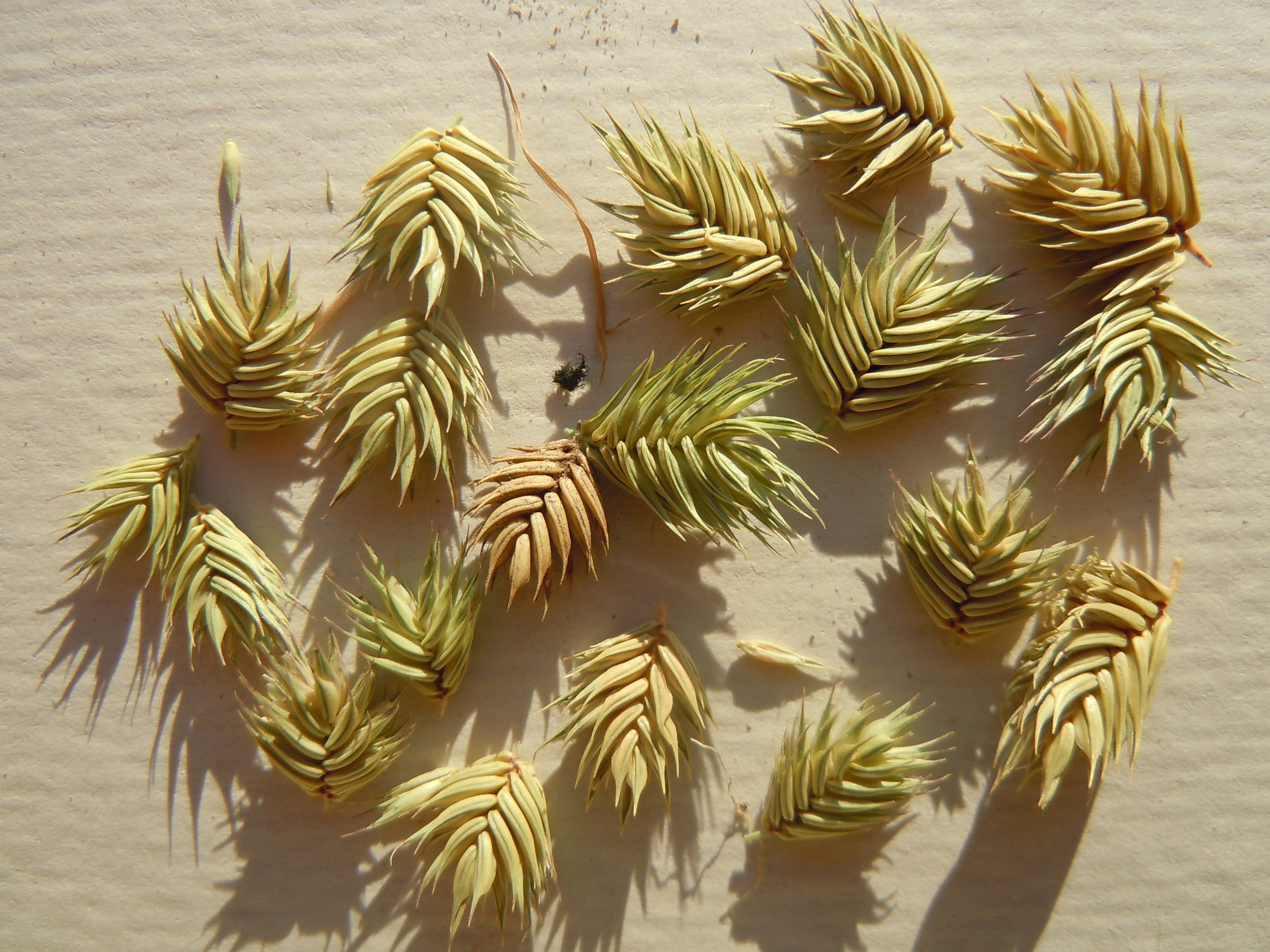
- Eremopyrum triticeum

Scientific classification
- Kingdom: Plantae
- Clade: Tracheophytes
- Clade: Angiosperms
- Clade: Monocots
- Clade: Commelinids
- Order: Poales
- Family: Poaceae
- Subfamily: Pooideae
- Supertribe: Triticodae
- Tribe: Triticeae
- Genus: Eremopyrum (Ledeb.) Jaub. & Spach

Type species
- Eremopyrum orientale (L.) Jaub. & Spach.

Synonyms
- Triticum sect. Eremopyrum Ledeb.; Agropyron sect. Eremopyrum (Ledeb.) Benth. & Hook.f.; Cremopyrum (Ledeb.) Schur

= Eremopyrum =

Genus of grasses

Eremopyrum is a genus Eurasian and North African plants in the grass family. One species, Eremopyrum triticeum has become widely established as a weed in parts of North America.

All the species are annuals with a dense, 2-sided, spikelike inflorescence having 1 spikelet per node.

Species

- Eremopyrum bonaepartis (Spreng.) Nevski - Algeria, Morocco, Middle East, Arabian Peninsula, Central Asia, Iran, Pakistan, Xinjiang
- Eremopyrum distans (K.Koch) Nevski - European Russia, Caucasus, Middle East, Arabian Peninsula, Central Asia, Iran, Pakistan, Xinjiang, Mongolia
- Eremopyrum orientale (L.) Jaub. & Spach - Algeria, Morocco, Tunisia, Romania, Ukraine, Crimea, European Russia, Caucasus, Middle East, Central Asia, Iran, Pakistan, Xinjiang, Tibet, Inner Mongolia
- Eremopyrum triticeum (Gaertn.) Nevski - Romania, Ukraine, Crimea, European Russia, Caucasus, Turkey, Central Asia, Iran, Xinjiang, Inner Mongolia

formerly included

see Agropyron Australopyrum Crithopsis Elymus Heteranthelium

- Eremopyrum brownei - Australopyrum pectinatum
- Eremopyrum bulbosum - Agropyron bulbosum
- Eremopyrum cretense - Crithopsis delileana
- Eremopyrum cristatum - Agropyron cristatum
- Eremopyrum dasyanthum - Agropyron dasyanthum
- Eremopyrum dasyphyllum - Agropyron fragile
- Eremopyrum fibrosum - Elymus fibrosus
- Eremopyrum olgae - Heteranthelium piliferum
- Eremopyrum puberulum - Agropyron cristatum
- Eremopyrum sibiricum - Agropyron fragile
