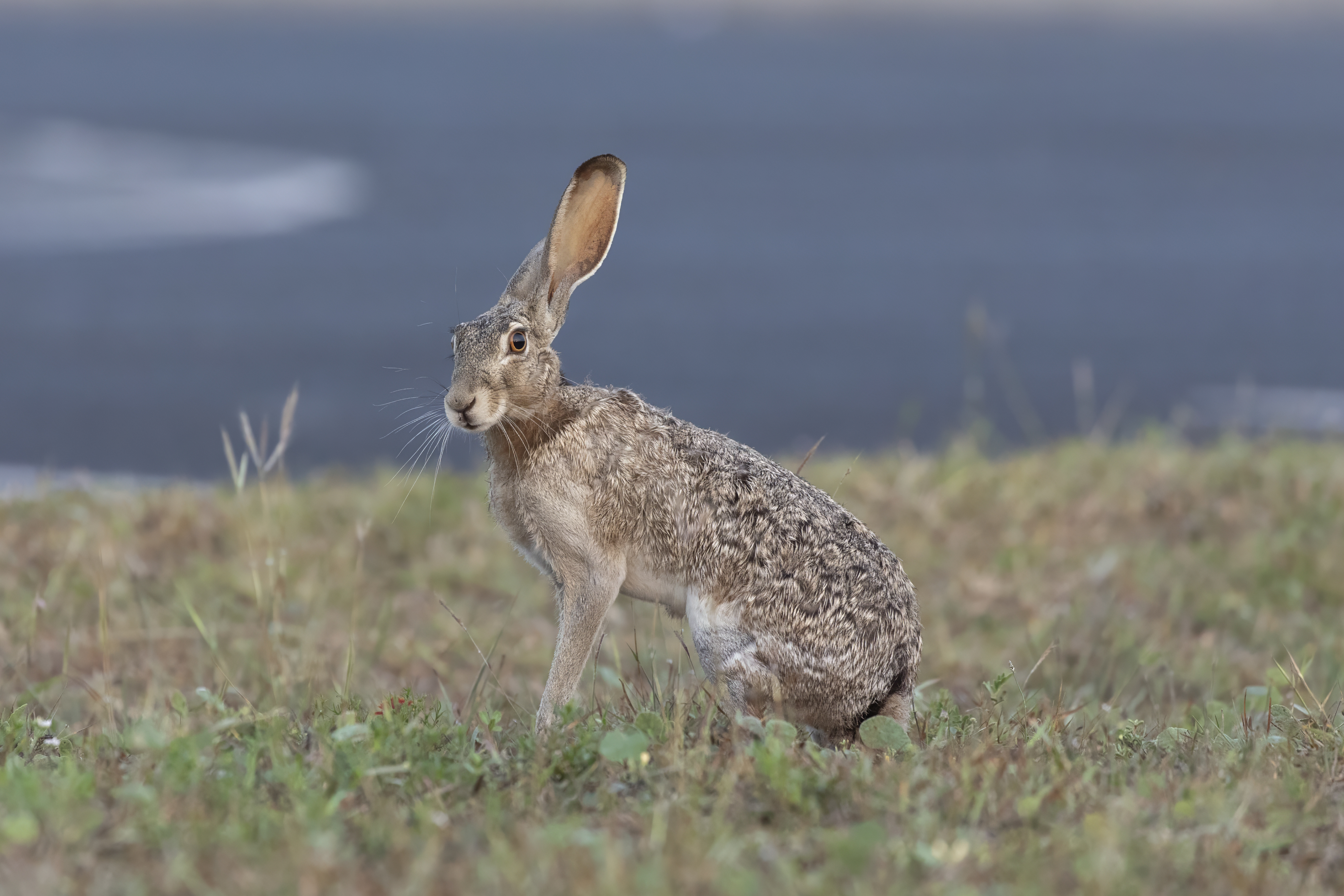

Conservation status
- Least Concern (IUCN 3.1)

Scientific classification
- Kingdom: Animalia
- Phylum: Chordata
- Class: Mammalia
- Order: Lagomorpha
- Family: Leporidae
- Genus: Lepus
- Species: L. californicus

Binomial name
- Lepus californicus J.E. Gray, 1837

Subspecies
- Lepus californicus californicus; Lepus californicus deserticola; Lepus californicus insularis; Lepus californicus madalenae; Lepus californicus melanotis; Lepus californicus texianus
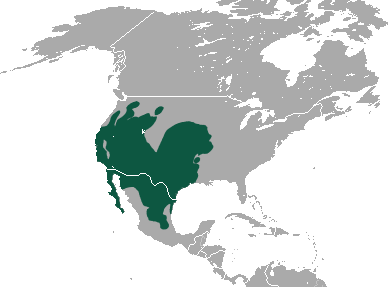
- Black-tailed jackrabbit range

= Black-tailed jackrabbit =

Common hare of the western United States and Mexico

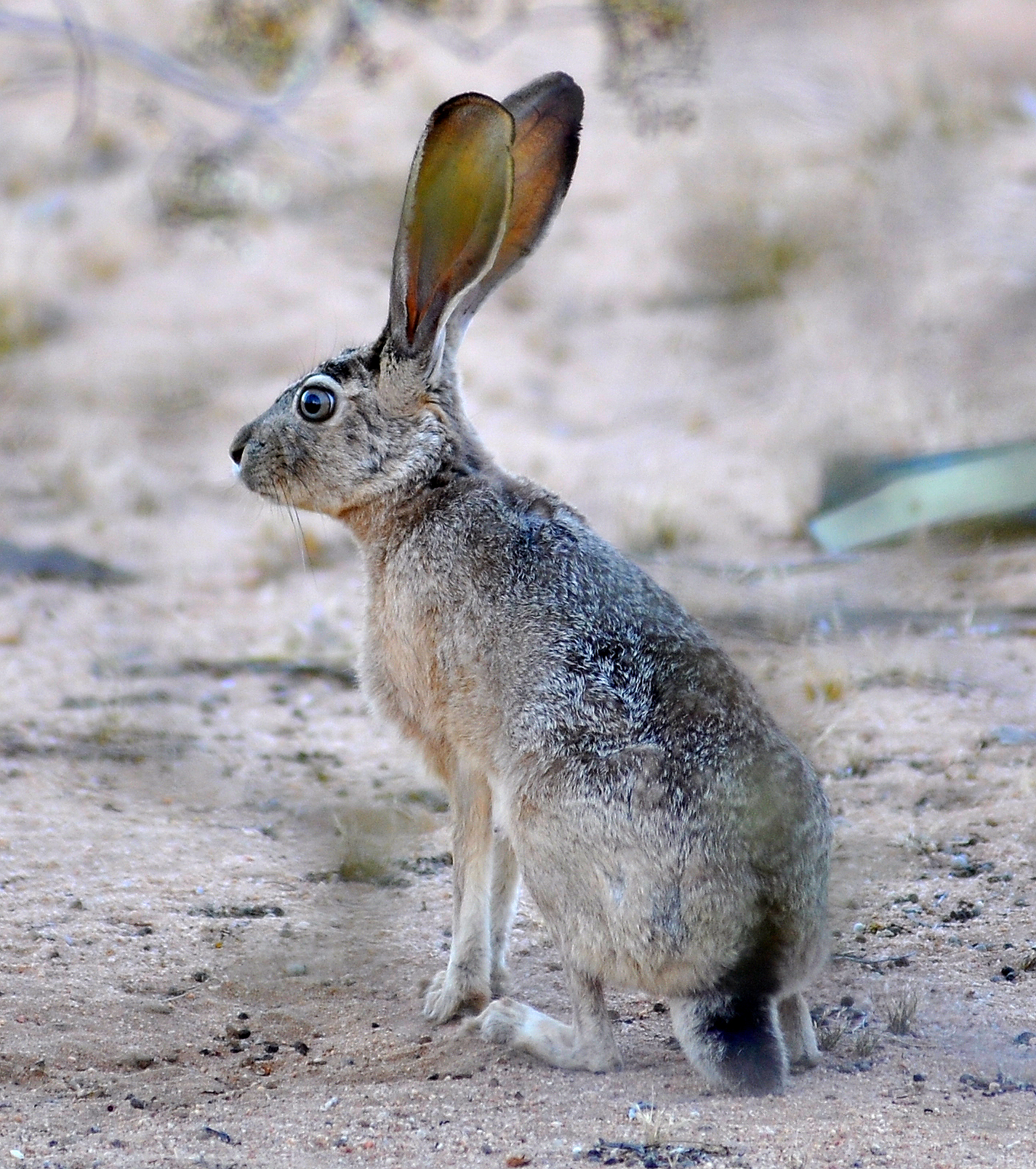
Black-tailed jackrabbit sitting

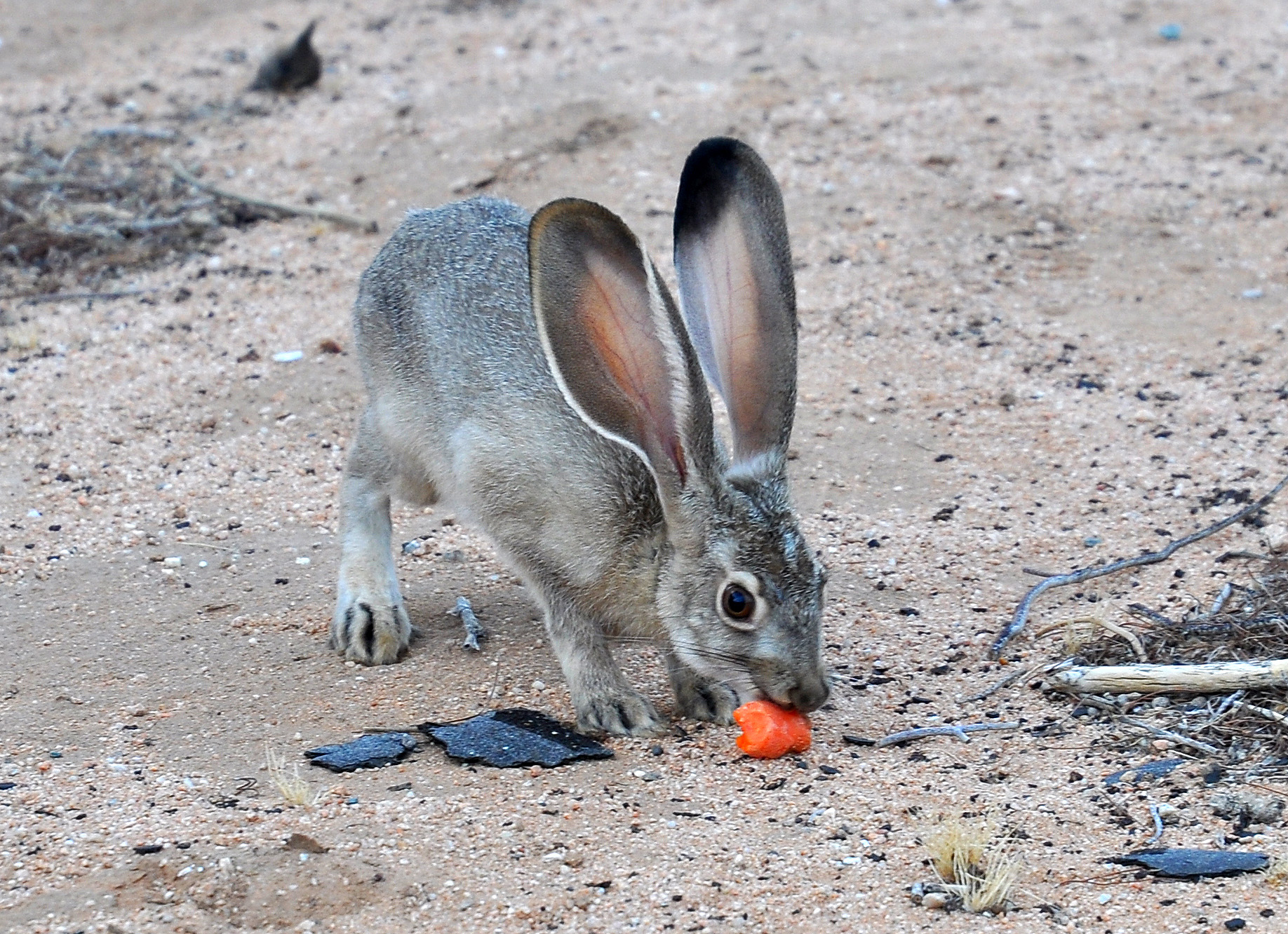
Juvenile black-tailed jackrabbit eating a carrot in the California Mojave Desert

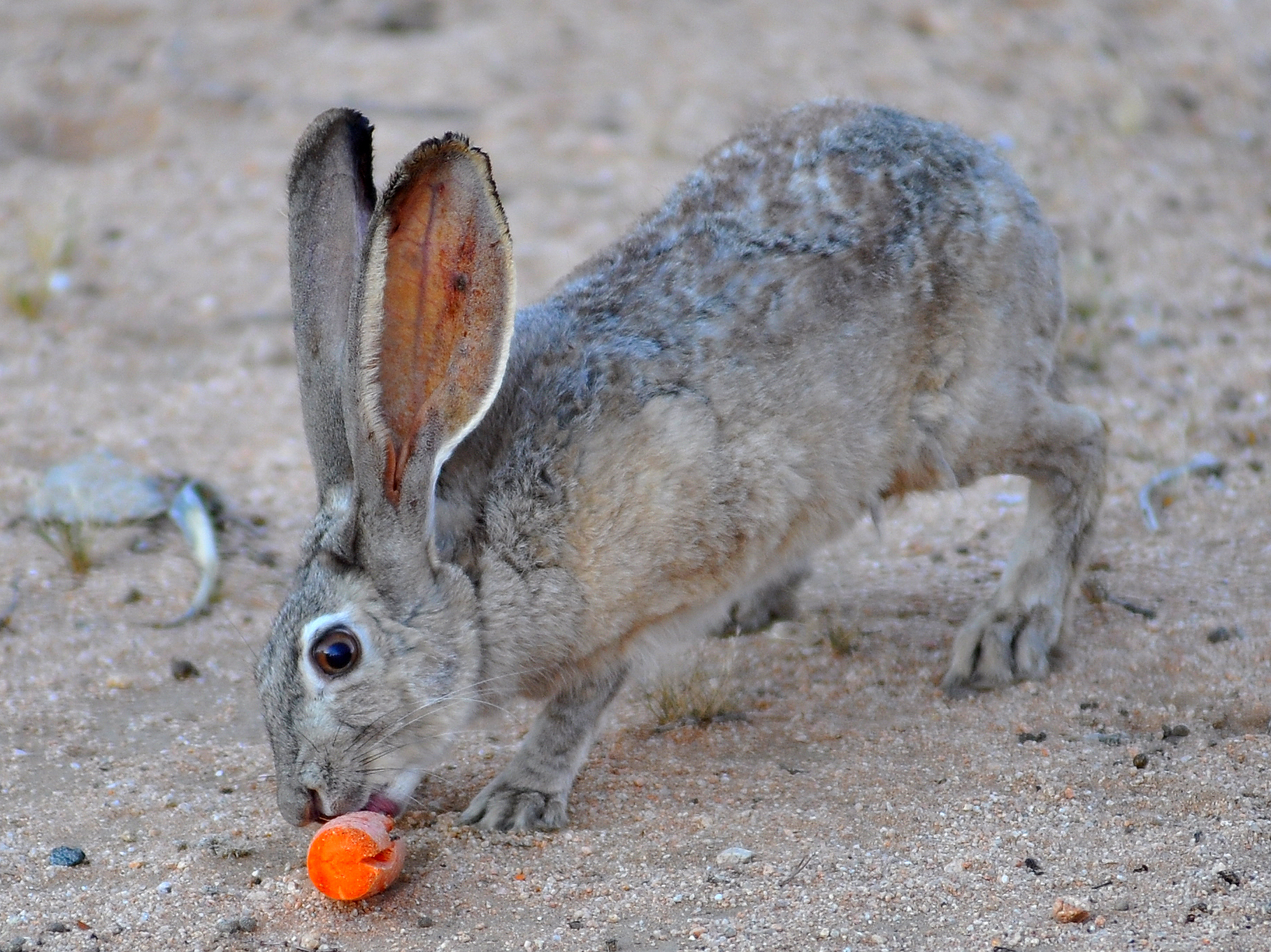
Weathered adult black-tailed jackrabbit eating

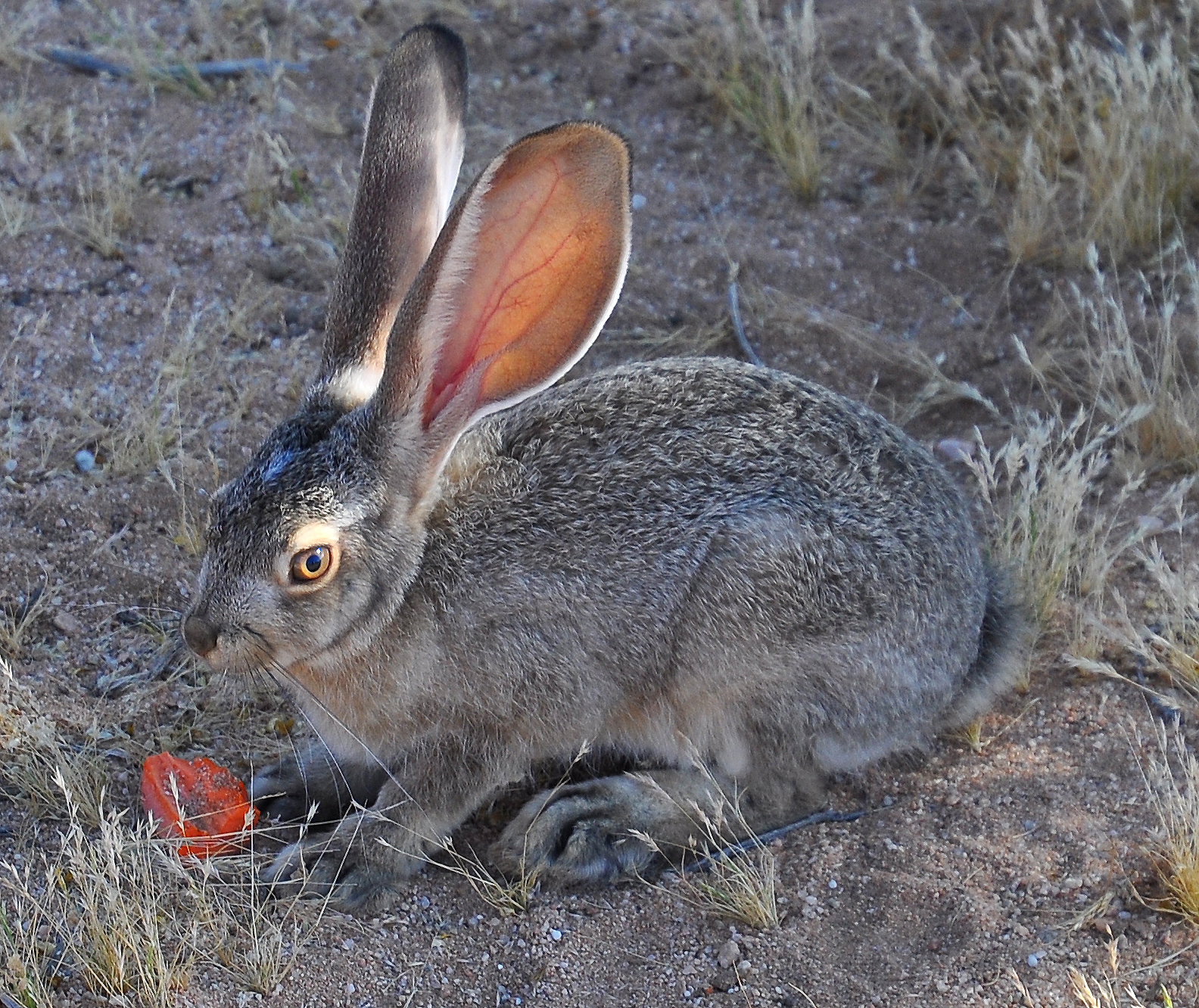
An adolescent black-tailed jackrabbit in the Mojave Desert, California

The black-tailed jackrabbit (Lepus californicus), also known as the American desert hare, is a common hare of the western United States and Mexico, where it is found at elevations from sea level up to 10,000 ft (3,000 m). Reaching a length around 2 ft (61 cm), and a weight from 3 to 6 lb (1.4 to 2.7 kg), the black-tailed jackrabbit is one of the largest North American hares. Black-tailed jackrabbits occupy mixed shrub-grassland terrains. Their breeding depends on the location; it typically peaks in spring, but may continue all year round in warm climates. Young are born fully furred with eyes open; they are well camouflaged and are mobile within minutes of birth, thus females do not protect or even stay with the young except during nursing. The average litter size is around four, but may be as low as two and as high as seven in warm regions.

The black-tailed jackrabbit does not migrate or hibernate during winter and uses the same habitat of 0.4–1.2 mi^{2} (1.0–3.1 km^{2}) year-round. Its diet is composed of various shrubs, small trees, grasses, and forbs. Shrubs generally comprise the bulk of fall and winter diets, while grasses and forbs are used in spring and early summer, but the pattern and plant species vary with climate. The black-tailed jackrabbit is an important prey species for raptors and carnivorous mammals, such as eagles, hawks, owls, coyotes, foxes, and wild cats. The hares host many ectoparasites including fleas, ticks, lice, and mites; for this reason, hunters often avoid collecting them.

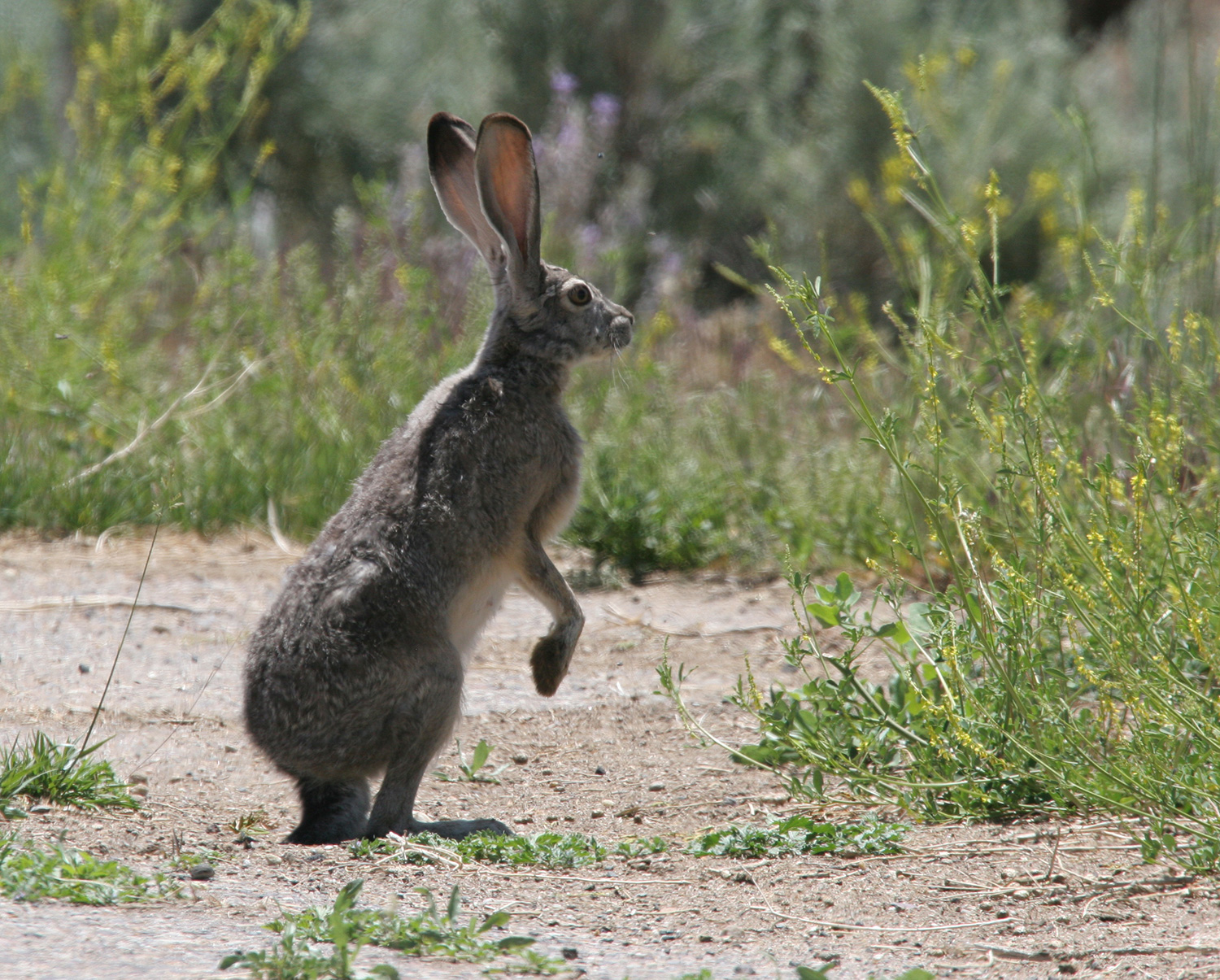
Typical pose when alerted

== Description ==
Like other jackrabbits, the black-tailed jackrabbit has distinctive long ears, and the long powerful rear legs characteristic of hares. Reaching a length about 2 ft (61 cm), and a weight from 3 to 6 lb (1.4 to 2.7 kg), the black-tailed jackrabbit is the third-largest North American jackrabbit, after the antelope jackrabbit and the white-tailed jackrabbit. Additionally, the much more northerly Arctic hare and Alaskan hare are somewhat larger than the jackrabbit members of the hare genus. The black-tailed jackrabbit's dorsal fur is agouti (dark buff peppered with black), and its undersides and the insides of its legs are creamy white. The ears are black-tipped on the outer surfaces, and unpigmented inside. The ventral surface of the tail is grey to white, and the black dorsal surface of the tail continues up the spine for a few inches to form a short, black stripe. The females are larger than males, with no other significant differences.

== Taxonomy and distribution ==
Although 17 subspecies are recognized, this number may be excessive. Using cluster analysis of anatomical characters, Dixon and others found that black-tailed jackrabbit subspecies separated into two distinct groups that are geographically separated west and east of the Colorado Rocky Mountains and the Colorado River. They suggested only two infrataxa are warranted: the western subspecies L. c. californicus and the eastern subspecies L. c. texianus.

The black-tailed jackrabbit is the most widely distributed jackrabbit (Lepus species) in North America. Native black-tailed jackrabbit populations occur from central Washington east to Missouri and south to Baja California Sur and Zacatecas. Black-tailed jackrabbit distribution is currently expanding eastward in the Great Plains at the expense of white-tailed jackrabbit. The black-tailed jackrabbit has been successfully introduced in southern Florida and along the coastline in Maryland, New Jersey, and Virginia.

Six subspecies of L. californicus are in the Baja California Peninsula, three of which are endemic to the surrounding islands. The current distribution is a result of sea-level rise about 21,000 years ago, after the last glacial maximum. Due to this geographic isolation, the current subspecies of L. californicus living on the peninsula can be separated into three subclades based on similar DNA structure and pelage color. The first clade is associated with subspecies L. c. xanti, and contains all subspecies found in the southernmost part of the Baja Peninsula; it has a yellowish color pattern. The second clade is associated with subspecies L. c. magdalenae, and includes all subspecies found between the La Paz isthmus and the southern Vixcaino Desert, including subspecies L. c. xanti, L. c. sheldoni, and L. c. martirensis. This clade has a coloration pattern range of light brown to yellow. The third clade is associated with subspecies L. c. martirensis, and includes all subspecies found from the Viscaino Desert to the northernmost part of the peninsula.

Distribution of subspecies occurring entirely or partially in the United States is:

- L. c. altamirae (Nelson)
- L. c. asellus (G. S. Miller)
- L. c. bennettii (Gray) – coastal southern California to Baja California Norte
- L. c. californicus (Gray) – coastal Oregon to coastal and Central Valley California
- L. c. curti (E. R. Hall)
- L. c. deserticola (Mearns) – southern Idaho to Sonora
- L. c. ememicus (J. A. Allen) – central Arizona to Sonora
- L. c. festinus (Nelson)
- L. c. magdalenae (Nelson)
- L. c. martirensis (J. M. Stowell)
- L. c. melanotis (Mearns) – South Dakota to Iowa, Missouri, and central Texas
- L. c. merriamai (Mearns) – south-central and southeastern Texas to Tamaulipas
- L. c. richardsonii (Bachman) – central California
- L. c. sheldoni (W. H. Burt)
- L. c. texianus (Waterhouse) – southeastern Utah and southwestern Colorado to Zacatecas
- L. c. wallawalla (Merriam) – eastern Washington to northeastern California and northwestern Nevada
- L. c. xanti (Thomas)

== Plant communities ==
The black-tailed jackrabbit occupies plant communities with a mixture of shrubs, grasses, and forbs. Shrubland-herb mosaics are preferred over pure stands of shrubs or herbs. Black-tailed jackrabbit populations are common in sagebrush (Artemisia spp.), creosotebush (Larrea tridentata), and other desert shrublands; palouse, shortgrass, and mixed-grass prairies; desert grassland; open-canopy chaparral; oak (Quercus spp.), and pinyon-juniper (Pinus-Juniperus spp.) woodlands; and early seral (succeeding each other), low- to mid-elevation coniferous forests. It is also common in and near croplands, especially alfalfa (Medicago sativa) fields.

== Lifestyle ==
Male black-tailed jackrabbits reach sexual maturity around 7 months of age. Females usually breed in the spring of their second year, although females born in spring or early summer may breed in their first year. Ovulation is induced by copulation. The breeding season is variable depending upon latitude and environmental factors. In the northern part of their range in Idaho, black-tailed jackrabbits breed from February through May. In Utah, they breed from January through July, with over 75% of females pregnant by April. The Kansas breeding season extends from January to August. Breeding in warm climates continues nearly year-round. Two peak breeding seasons corresponding to rainfall patterns and growth of young vegetation occur in California, Arizona, and New Mexico. In Arizona, for example, breeding peaks during winter (January–March) rains and again during June monsoons.

The gestation period ranges from 41 to 47 days. More litters are born in warm climates: the number of litters born each year ranges from two per year in Idaho to seven in Arizona. Litter sizes are largest in the northern portions of black-tailed jackrabbit's range and decrease toward the south. Average litter size has been reported at 4.9 in Idaho, 3.8 in Utah, and 2.2 in Arizona.

Female black-tailed jackrabbits do not prepare an elaborate nest. They give birth in shallow excavations called forms that are no more than a few centimeters deep. Females may line forms with fur prior to giving birth, but some drop litters in existing depressions on the ground with no further preparation. Young are born fully furred with eyes open, and are mobile within minutes of birth. Females do not protect or even stay with the young except during nursing. Ages of weaning and dispersal are unclear since the young are well camouflaged and rarely observed in the field. Captive black-tailed jackrabbits are fully weaned by 8 weeks. The young stay together for at least a week after leaving the form.

== Preferred habitat ==
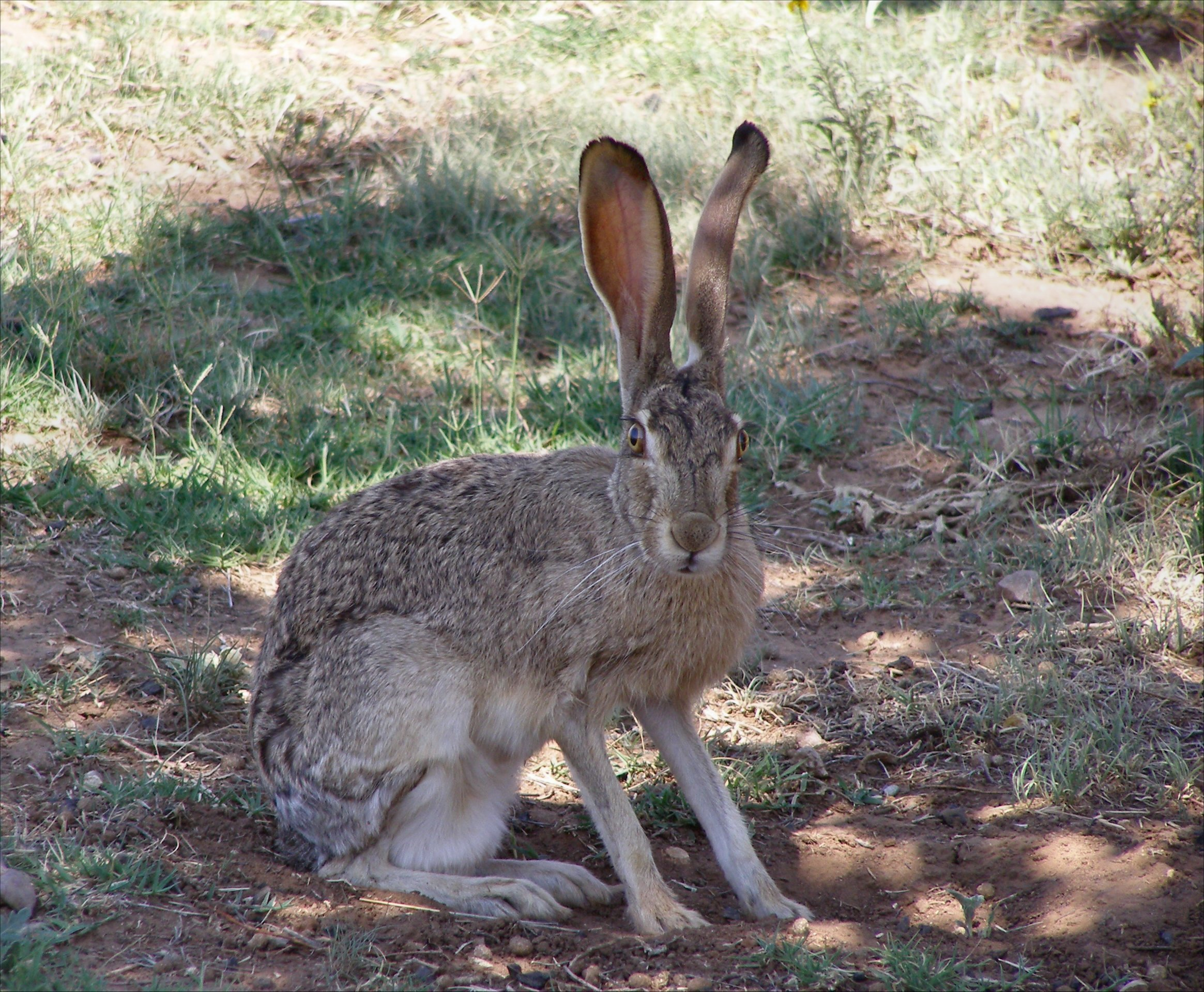
Black-tailed jackrabbit in Texas, cooling off in the shade on a hot summer's day

The black-tailed jackrabbit can occupy a wide range of habitats as long as diversity in plant species exists. It requires mixed grasses, forbs, and shrubs for food, and shrubs or small trees for cover. It prefers moderately open areas without dense understory growth and is seldom found in closed-canopy habitats. For example, in California, black-tailed jackrabbits are plentiful in open chamise (Ademostoma fasciculatum) and Ceanothus spp. chaparral interspersed with grasses, but does not occupy closed-canopy chaparral. Similarly, the black-tailed jackrabbit occupies clearcuts and early seral coniferous forest, but not closed-canopy coniferous forest.

Black-tailed jackrabbits do not migrate or hibernate during winter; the same habitat is used year-round. Diurnal movement of 2–10 mi (3.2–16.1 km) occurs from shrub cover in day to open foraging areas at night. Home range area varies with habitat and habitat quality. Home ranges of 0.4–1.2 mi^{2} (1.0–3.1 km^{2}) have been reported in big sagebrush (Artemisia tridentata) and black greasewood (Sarcobatus vermiculatus) communities of northern Utah.

Black-tailed jackrabbits require shrubs or small conifers for hiding, nesting, and thermal cover, and grassy areas for night feeding. A shrub-grassland mosaic or widely spaced shrubs interspersed with herbs provides hiding cover while providing feeding opportunities. Small shrubs do not provide adequate cover. In the Snake River Birds of Prey Study Area in southwestern Idaho, black-tailed jackrabbits were more frequent on sites dominated by big sagebrush or black greasewood than on sites dominated by the smaller shrubs winterfat (Krascheninnikovia lanata) or shadscale (Atriplex confertifolia). Black-tailed jackrabbits do not habitually use a burrow, although they have occasionally been observed using abandoned burrows for escape and thermal cover.

== Food habits ==
The black-tailed jackrabbit diet is composed of shrubs, small trees, grasses, and forbs. Throughout the course of a year, black-tailed jackrabbits feed on most if not all of the important plant species in a community, as well as some fungi. Growth stage and moisture content of plants may influence selection more than species. Shrubs generally comprise the bulk of fall and winter diets, while grasses and forbs are used in spring and early summer. This pattern varies with climate: herbaceous plants are grazed during greenup periods while the plants are in pre-reproductive to early reproductive stages, and shrubs are used more in dry seasons. Shrubs are browsed throughout the year, however. Most of a jackrabbit's body water is replaced by foraging water-rich vegetation. Jackrabbits require a plant's water weight to be at least five times its dry weight to meet daily water intake requirements. Therefore, black-tailed jackrabbits switch to phreatophyte (deep-rooted) shrubs when herbaceous vegetation is recovering from their foraging.

Plant species used by black-tailed jackrabbits are well documented for desert regions. Forage use in other regions is less well known. However, black-tailed jackrabbits browse Douglas fir (Pseudotsuga menziesii), ponderosa pine (Pinus ponderosa), lodgepole pine (P. contorta), and western hemlock (Tsuga heterophylla) seedlings, and oak (Quercus spp.) seedlings and sprouts.

=== Great Basin ===
In the Great Basin, big sagebrush is a primary forage species and is used throughout the year; in southern Idaho it forms 16–21% of the black-tailed jackrabbit summer diet. Rabbitbrush (Chrysothamnus spp.), spiny hop sage (Grayia spinosa), and black greasewood are also browsed. Four-wing saltbush (Atriplex canescens) is heavily used in western Nevada. In Butte County, Idaho, winterfat comprises 41% of black-tailed jackrabbits' annual diet. Grasses comprise 14% of the diet, with most grass consumption in March and April. Russian thistle (Salsola kali) is an important forb diet item. Needle-and-thread grass (Hesperostipa comata) and Indian ricegrass (Eriocoma hymenoides) are preferred grasses. Other preferred native grasses include Sandberg bluegrass (Poa secunda) and bluebunch wheatgrass (Pseudoroegneria spicata). Where available, crested wheatgrass (Agropyron desertorum and Agropyron cristatum) and barley (Hordeum vulgare) are highly preferred. Cheatgrass (Bromus tectorum) use is variable: it comprises 45% of the April diet on two southern Idaho sites, but black-tailed jackrabbit on an eastern Washington site do not use it.

=== Warm desert ===
In the warm desert, mesquite (Prosopis spp.) and creosotebush (Larrea tridentata) are principal browse species. Broom snakeweed (Gutierrezia sarothrae) and Yucca spp. are also used. In honey mesquite (Prosopis glandulosa var. glandulosa) communities in New Mexico, the overall black-tailed jackrabbit diet was 47% shrubs, 22% grasses, and 31% forbs. Black grama (Bouteloua spp.), dropseed (Sporobolus spp.), fluffgrass (Erioneuron pulchellum), and threeawns (Aristida spp.) are the most commonly grazed grasses. Leather croton (Croton pottsii), silverleaf nightshade (Solanum elaeagnifolium), desert marigold (Baileya multiradiata), wooly paperflower (Psilostrophe tagetina), and globemallow (Sphaeralcea spp.) are important forbs, although many forb species are grazed. Opuntia spp., saguaro (Carnegiea gigantea), and other cacti are used throughout the year, but are especially important in dry seasons as a source of moisture.

== Predators ==
The black-tailed jackrabbit is an important prey species for many raptors and carnivorous mammals. The black-tailed jackrabbit and Townsend's ground squirrel (Urocitellus townsendii) are the two most important prey species on the Snake River Birds of Prey Study Area. Hawks preying on black-tailed jackrabbits include the ferruginous hawk (Buteo regalis), white-tailed hawk (Geranoaetus albicaudatus), Swainson's hawk (B. swainsoni), and red-tailed hawk (B. jamaicensis). The black-tailed jackrabbit is the primary prey of Swainson's, red-tailed, and ferruginous hawks on Idaho and Utah sites. Other raptors consuming black-tailed jackrabbits include the great horned owl (Bubo virginianus), burrowing owl (Athene cunicularia), golden eagle (Aquila chrysaetos), and bald eagle (Haliaeetus leucocephalus). A significant correlation exists between golden eagle and black-tailed jackrabbit reproduction patterns. In Colorado and southeastern Wyoming, black-tailed jackrabbits constitute 9% of nesting bald eagles' diet. Jackrabbits and cottontails (Sylvilagus spp.) combined form 9% of the diet of bald eagles wintering on national forests in Arizona and New Mexico.

Mammalian predators include coyote (Canis latrans), bobcat (Lynx rufus), Canada lynx (Lynx canadensis), domestic dog (Canis familiaris), domestic cat (Felis catus), red fox (Vulpes vulpes), common gray fox (Urocyon cinereoargenteus), American badger (Taxidea taxus), wolf (Canis lupus), and cougar (Puma concolor). In many areas, black-tailed jackrabbit is the primary item in coyote diets. It is locally and regionally important to other mammalian predators. One study found that jackrabbits made up 45% of the bobcat diet in Utah and Nevada. Another Utah–Nevada study found that jackrabbits were the fourth-most commonly consumed prey of cougars.

Rattlesnakes (Crotalus spp.) and bullsnakes (Pituophis catenifer sayi) prey on black-tailed jackrabbit young. Raccoons (Procyon lotor) and striped skunks (Mephitis mephitis) may also capture young.

== Parasites and disease ==
The black-tailed jackrabbit plays host to many ectoparasites including fleas, ticks, lice, and mites, and many endoparasites including trematodes, cestodes, nematodes, and botfly (Cuterebra) larvae. Diseases affecting the black-tailed jackrabbit in the West are tularemia, equine encephalitis, brucellosis, Q fever, and Rocky Mountain spotted fever. Ticks are vectors for tularemia, and infected ticks have been found on jackrabbits in the West. Jackrabbits infected with tularemia die very quickly.

The high prevalence of disease and parasites in wild jackrabbits affects human predation. Many hunters will not collect the jackrabbits they shoot, and those who do are well-advised to wear gloves while handling carcasses and to cook the meat thoroughly to avoid contracting tularemia. Most hunting of jackrabbits is done for pest control or sport.

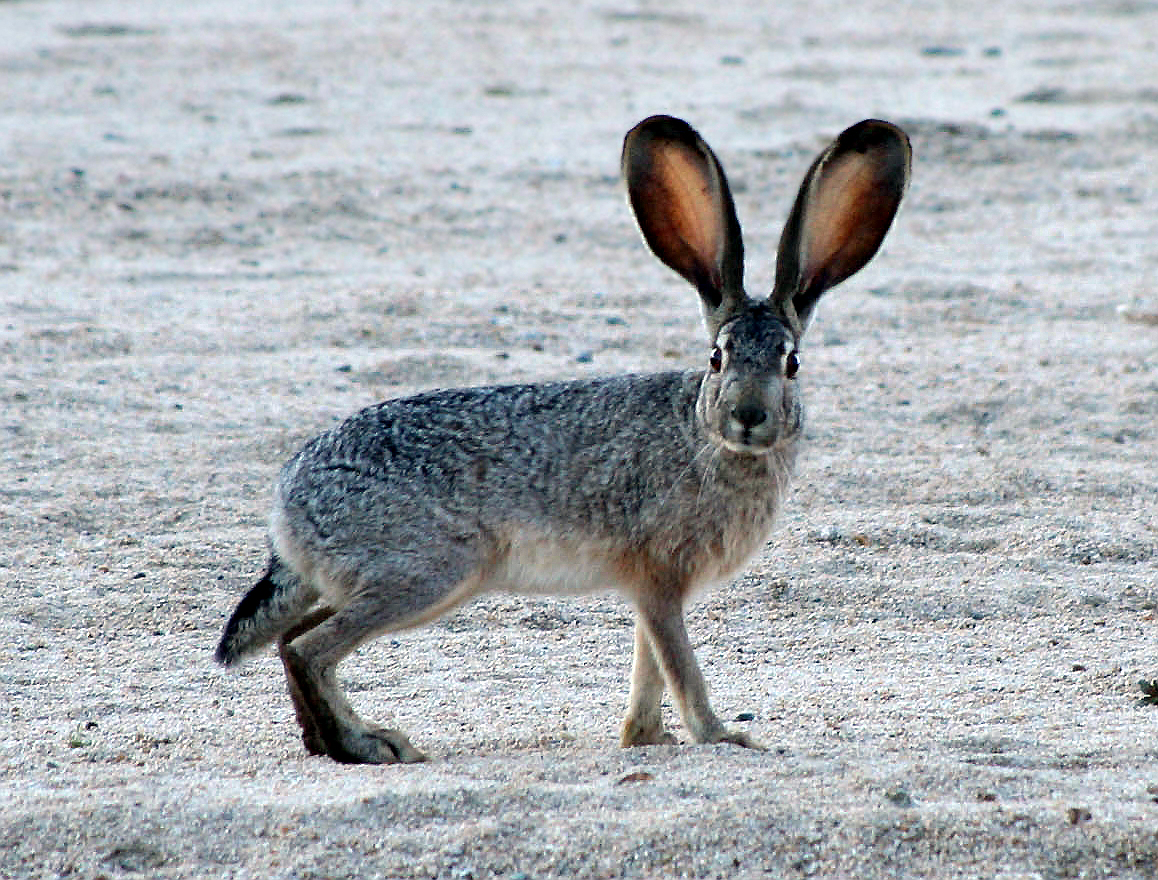
