= Natural disturbance regime of the Sagebrush Sea of the Great Basin =

The Sagebrush Sea, also called the sagebrush steppe, is an ecosystem of the Great Basin that is primarily centered on the 27 species of sagebrush that grow from sea level to about 12,000 feet. This ecosystem is home to hundreds of species of both fauna and flora. It includes small mammals such as pygmy rabbits, reptiles such as the sagebrush lizard, birds such as the golden eagles, and countless other species that are solely found in this ecosystem. This ecosystem at one point occupied over 62 million hectares in the western United States and southwestern Canada. It currently only occupies about 56 percent of historic range and is continuing to decline due to several factors.

== Location ==
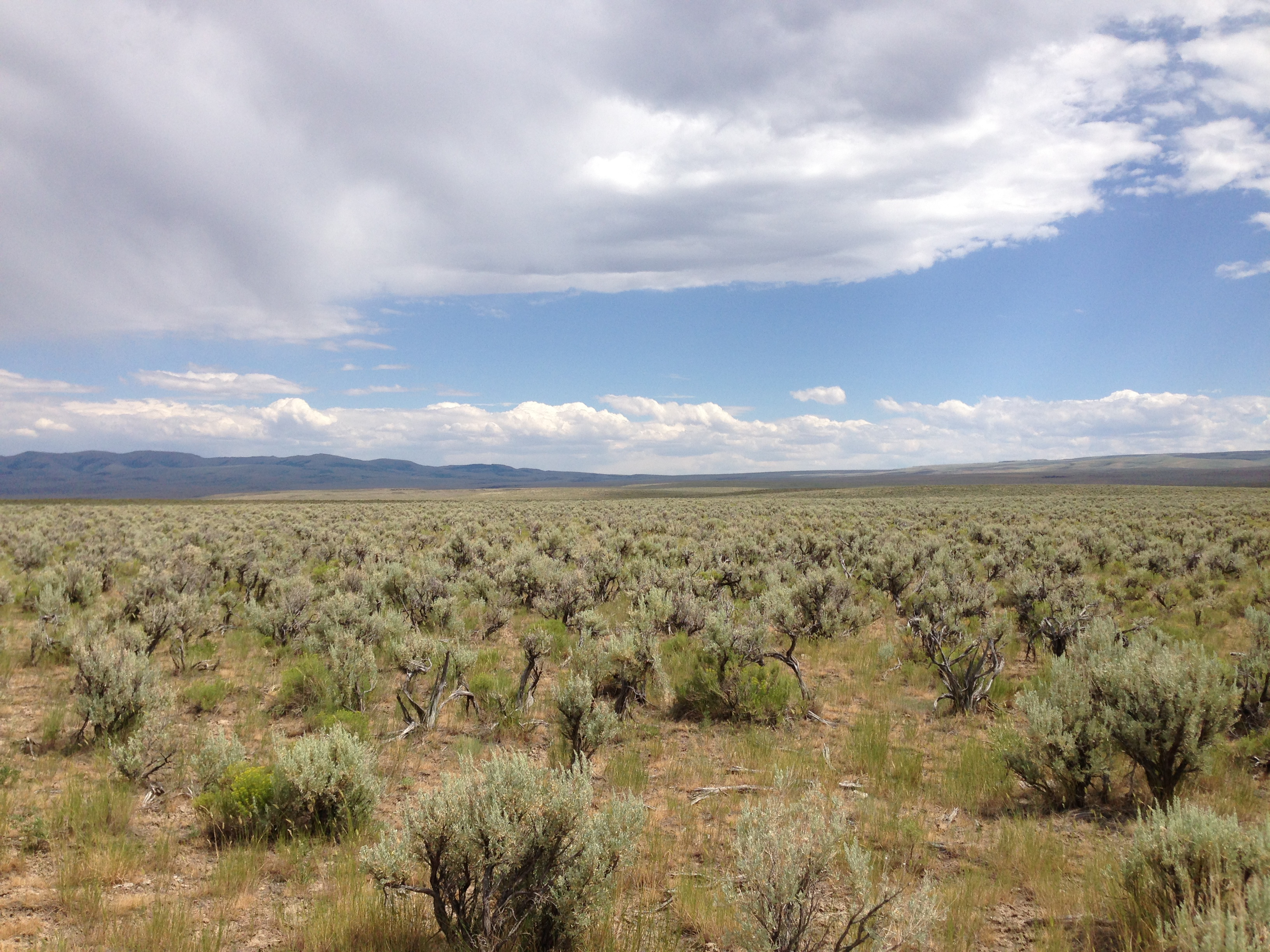
Great Basin Sagebrush Ecosystem

Sagebrush steppe ecosystems occur in Nevada and parts of Utah, Oregon, Idaho, and California. Its western edge is defined by the Sierra Nevada and the Cascade Range, and its eastern edge is the Wasatch Mountains. The northern boundary is the Snake river, and its southern boundary is defined by the Mojave Desert in California.

== Threats ==
Some sagebrush ecosystems rely on recurrent fire. Due to the disruption of the fire cycle, several species have encroached on sagebrush. These species that threaten the sagebrush are:

=== Conifer woodlands ===
Conifer woodlands consist of two main species: Juniperus or Junipers and Pinus or Pinyon. These conifers are able to establish and increase in density to the point where sagebrush are outcompeted because they cannot get adequate sunlight and nutrients from the soil. This decline in sagebrush has fragmented sagebrush habitats and caused a disruption in the fauna (e.g., sage grouse). Predation may increase in fragment habitats due to lack of cover for the prey.

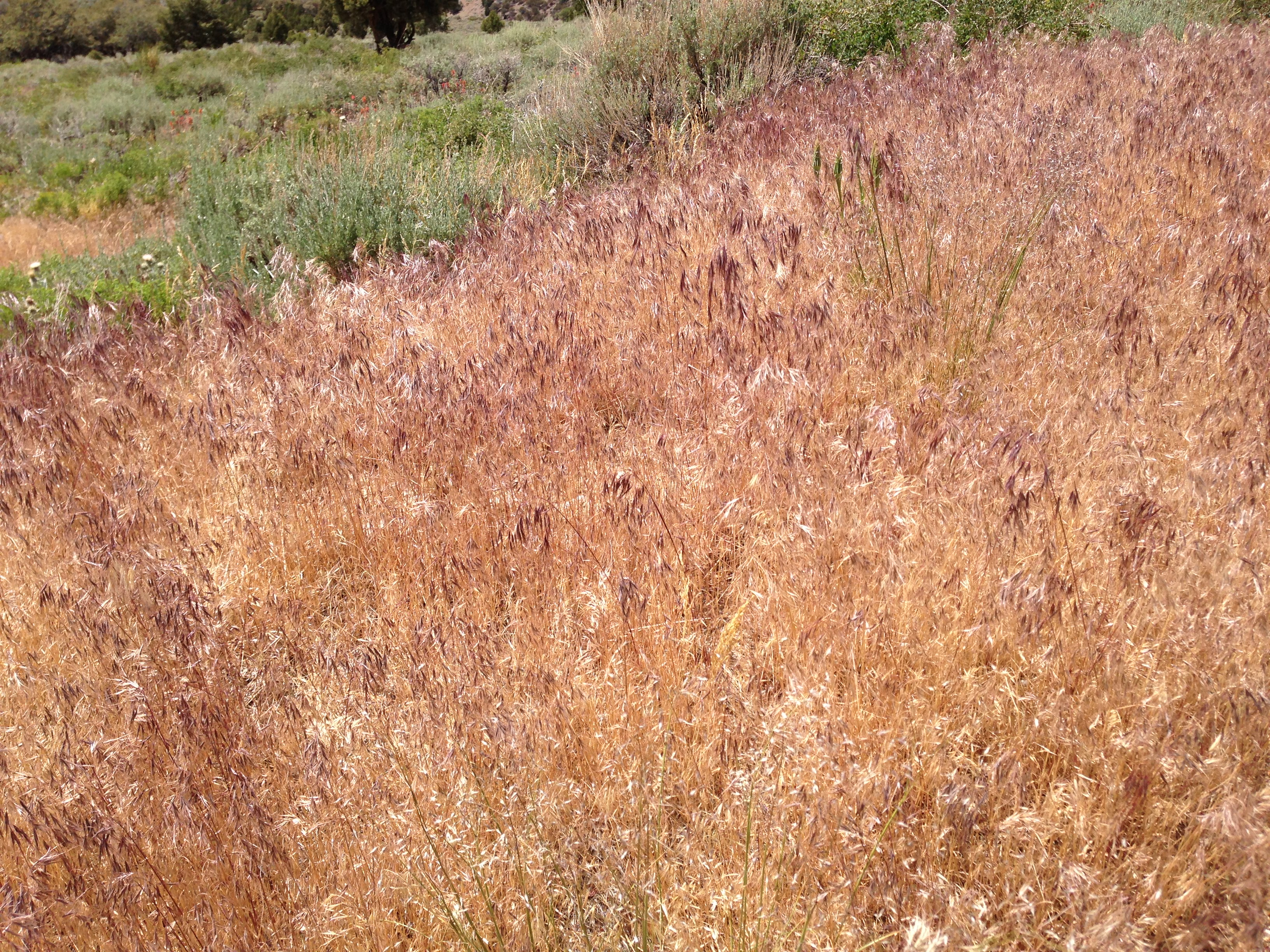
Agropyron cristatum or cheatgrass

=== Exotic annual grasses ===
Several exotic grasses have come into these sagebrush ecosystem and have been labeled noxious weeds which is determined by the agricultural authority. The two main annual grasses that are causes much of the problems are: Bromus tectorum or cheatgrass and Agropyron cristatum or chested wheatgrass. Both species enter areas that have been recently disturbed and rapidly expand into their surroundings through massive growth and seed production. These grasses are so effective because they produce above ground biomass sooner and thicker than competitors and block them out. These exotic grasses alter the natural fire regime and cause an increase in fire frequencies because while these grasses outcompete early on they also dry out in the summer and provide fuel for fire that ultimately cause fires to spread faster and with greater frequency.

== Fire ==
Fires are both a natural and man-made influence in these systems that help: reduce hazards, control species both desirable and undesirable, improve access and visibility, disease control, and lastly fires in these habitats have been used to create varying stages of succession in an area. Thus fires may increase biodiversity. For example, fires may reduce competition and provide opportunities for herbaceous flora. For the first three decades after a burn there is a drastic increase in the production of grasses, followed by a reestablishment of sagebrush. By having areas in varying stages of succession, the effects of major events like wildfires and diseases are likely to be less severe than if landscape patterns were more uniform.

== Restoration efforts ==
Traditional conservation efforts usually focus on single species, which are extremely expensive and have finite results. Comprehensive conservation plans focus on entire ecosystems and benefit numerous species in a more effective way. Currently the Great Basin has seen more traditional conservation plans and would greatly benefit from a more comprehensive plan to help preserve the more than 350 species of sagebrush associated fauna and flora.

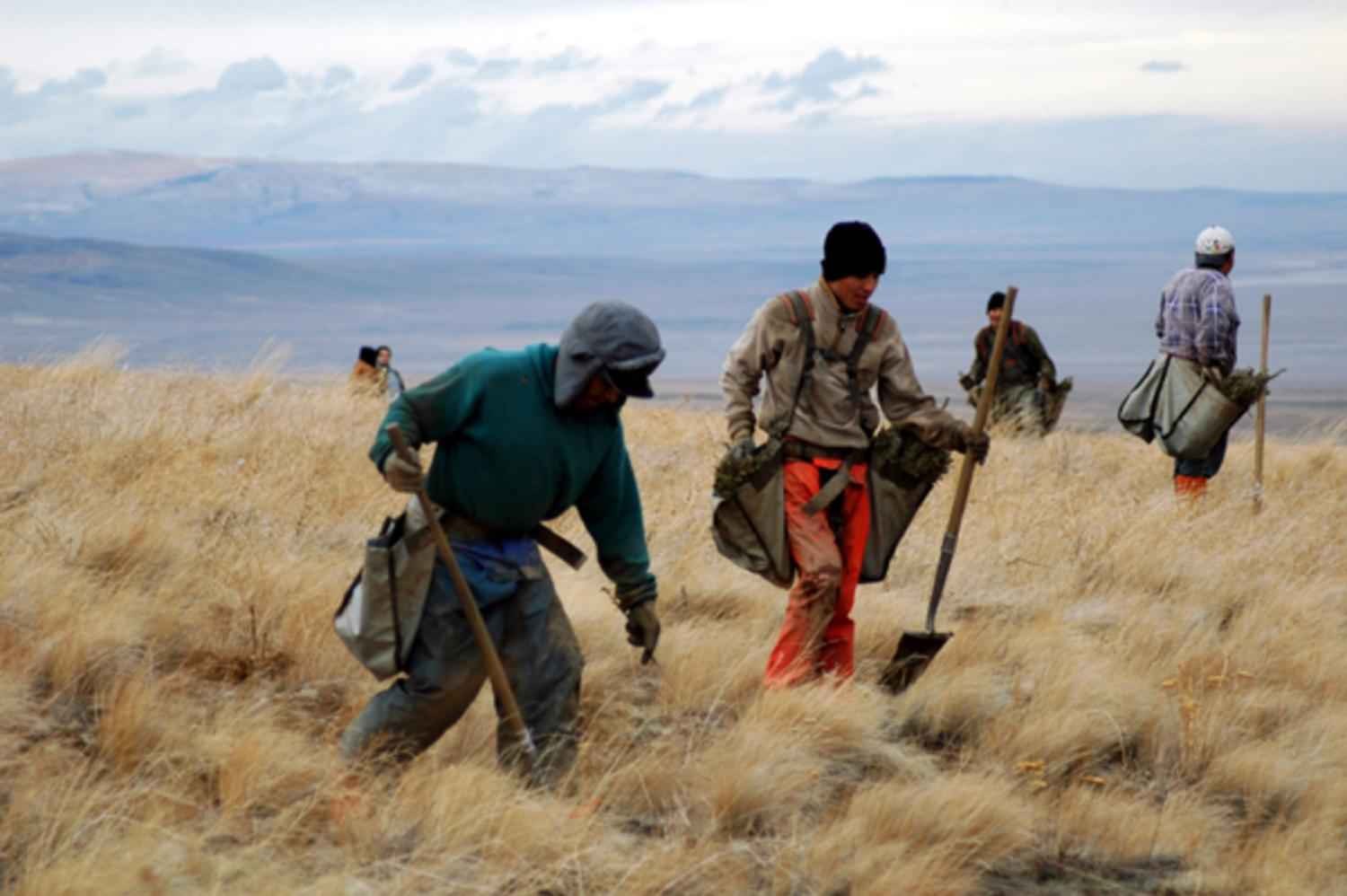
Sagebrush Restoration

=== Conifer woodlands ===
Conifer woodlands are controlled primarily through the uses of chainsaws, heavy equipment and prescribed fires. This ensures that woodlands are reduced and sagebrush are restored by decreasing the woody fuel load and allowing adequate perennial fauna composition for restoration and recovery.

=== Exotic annual grasses ===
Exotic annual grasses are controlled through number of ways: physical removal, chemical means, introduction of cattle for grazing, and prescribed fires. All of which are extremely expensive and labor-intensive due to the rapid nature of its spread. All of these control methods can also be potentially harmful to sagebrush if not properly implemented.
