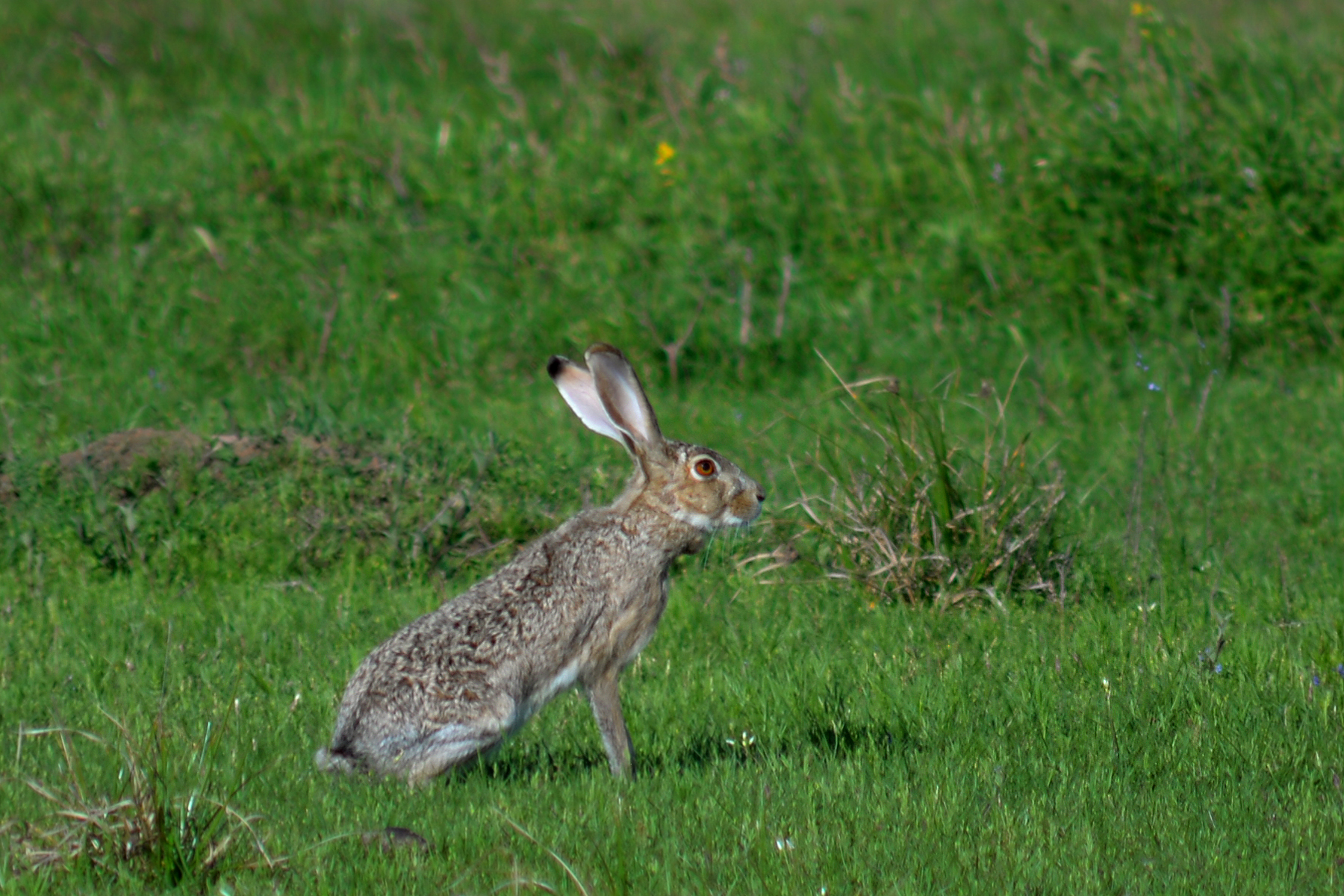
- A potential individual at Attwater Prairie Chicken National Wildlife Refuge, Texas

Conservation status
- Least Concern (IUCN 3.1)

Scientific classification
- Kingdom: Animalia
- Phylum: Chordata
- Class: Mammalia
- Order: Lagomorpha
- Family: Leporidae
- Genus: Lepus
- Species: L. californicus
- Subspecies: L. c. texianus

Trinomial name
- Lepus californicus texianus Waterhouse, 1848

Synonyms
- Lepus texianus Audubon & Bachman

= Texas black-tailed jackrabbit =

Subspecies of rodent

The Texas black-tailed jackrabbit (Lepus californicus texianus) also known as the Texan black-tailed jackrabbit, Texian black-tailed jackrabbit, Texas jackrabbit, Texian hare, or the Texan jackrabbit, is a subspecies of the black-tailed jackrabbit that is native to parts of Texas, and the southwest United States, northern Mexico, and some occasional parts of central Mexico.

== Synonyms ==
The Texas black-tailed jackrabbit has one accepted synonym; being Lepus texianus (Texas jackrabbit) by John James Audubon and John Bachman in the Viviparous Quadrupeds of North America. The species taxonomic rank was then lowered to a subspecies rank, for the Texas black-tailed jackrabbit looked almost exactly the same as the common black-tailed jackrabbit.
