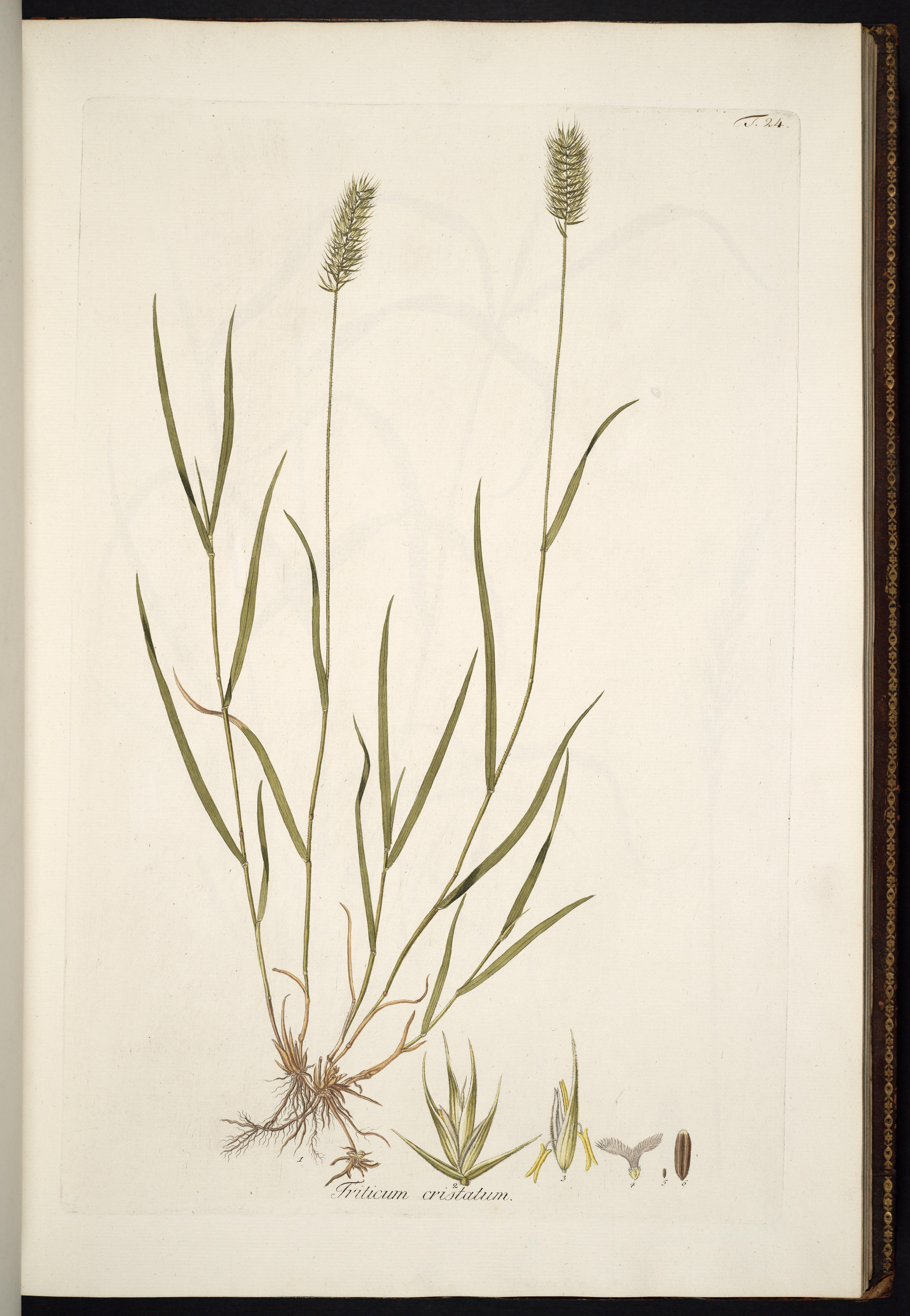
- Agropyron cristatum

Scientific classification
- Kingdom: Plantae
- Clade: Tracheophytes
- Clade: Angiosperms
- Clade: Monocots
- Clade: Commelinids
- Order: Poales
- Family: Poaceae
- Subfamily: Pooideae
- Supertribe: Triticodae
- Tribe: Triticeae
- Genus: Agropyron; Gaertn.

Type species
- Agropyron cristatum Gaertn.

Synonyms
- Costia Willk.; Cynopoa Ehrh.; Douglasdeweya C.Yen, J.L.Yang & B.R.Baum; Kratzmannia Opiz; Zeia Lunell

= Agropyron =

Wheatgrass

Genus of grasses

Agropyron is a genus of Eurasian plants in the grass family), native to Europe and Asia but widely naturalized in North America.

Species in the genus are commonly referred to as wheatgrass.

Species

- Agropyron badamense - Tajikistan, Kyrgyzstan, Uzbekistan, Kazakhstan
- Agropyron bulbosum - Iran
- Agropyron cimmericum - Ukraine, Crimea
- Agropyron cristatum - Crested wheatgrass - Eurasia + North Africa from Spain + Morocco to Korea + Khabarovsk; naturalized in western + central North America (United States, Canada, northern Mexico)
- Agropyron dasyanthum - Ukraine
- Agropyron desertorum - Desert Wheatgrass - from Crimea + Caucasus to Mongolia + Siberia
- Agropyron deweyi - Turkey
- Agropyron fragile - Siberian wheatgrass - from Caucasus to Mongolia; naturalized in scattered locales in western United States + Canada
- Agropyron michnoi - Buryatiya, Zabaykalsky Krai, Mongolia, Inner Mongolia
- Agropyron mongolicum - Gansu, Inner Mongolia, Ningxia, Shaanxi, Shanxi, Xinjiang
- Agropyron × pilosiglume - European Russia
- Agropyron tanaiticum - Ukraine, European Russia
- Agropyron thomsonii - Western Himalayas
- Agropyron tsukushiense (Honda) Ohwi Ohwi synonym Elymus tsukushiensis
- Agropyron tsukushiense var. transiens (Hack.) Ohwi synonym Elymus tsukushiensis

formerly included

species now considered better suited in other genera: Crithopsis Elymus Kengyilia Leymus Thinopyrum Vulpia etc.

== See also ==
- Wheatgrass
- List of Poaceae genera
