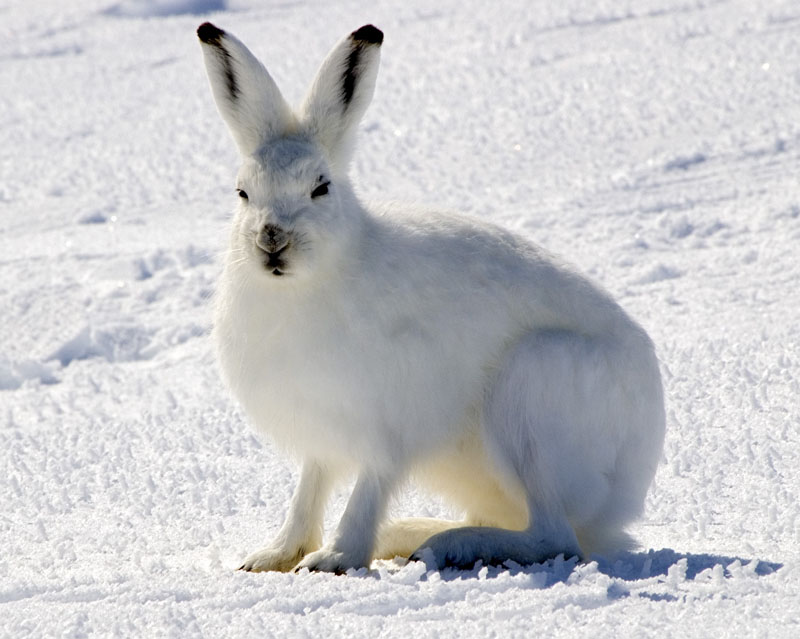
- Arctic hare in Nunavut, Canada

Conservation status
- Least Concern (IUCN 3.1)

Scientific classification
- Kingdom: Animalia
- Phylum: Chordata
- Class: Mammalia
- Infraclass: Placentalia
- Order: Lagomorpha
- Family: Leporidae
- Genus: Lepus
- Species: L. arcticus

Binomial name
- Lepus arcticus Ross, 1819

Subspecies
- 4, see text
- Arctic hare range

Synonyms
- Lepus glacialis Leach, 1819; Lepus timidus Var. arcticus J. A. Allen, 1877; Lepus groenlandicus Rhoads, 1896; Lepus labradorius G. S. Miller, 1899; Lepus variabilis hyperboreus Pedersen, 1930

= Arctic hare =

Species of mammal

The Arctic hare (Lepus arcticus) is a species of hare highly adapted to living in the Arctic tundra and other icy biomes. The Arctic hare survives with shortened ears and limbs, a small nose, fat that makes up close to 20% of its body, and a thick coat of fur. It usually digs holes in the ground or under the snow to keep warm and to sleep. Arctic hares look like rabbits but have shorter ears, are taller when standing, and, unlike rabbits, can thrive in extreme cold. They can travel together with many other hares, sometimes huddling with dozens or more, but are usually found alone, sometimes taking more than one partner. The Arctic hare can run up to 60 kilometres per hour (40 mph).

== Etymology ==
The Arctic hare is named for the region in which it was first discovered, the Arctic tundra. Its generic name, Lepus, is borrowed from Latin and refers to hares, rabbits (as inferred from the earlier Hellenistic Greek λεβηρίς (levirís), rabbit), and the constellation of the same name. The specific name, arcticus, is also borrowed from Latin, and is more directly derived from the Greek ἀρκτικός (arktikos), "near the Bear, northern".

In the Cree language, the Arctic hare is named meestapoos, coming from the words for "large", meesta, and "rabbit", wâpos.

== Taxonomy and phylogeny ==
Arctic explorer John Ross described the Arctic hare in 1819. In an appendix to his work A Voyage of Discovery, Ross relied upon the English zoologist William Elford Leach to distinguish many of the species found and shot by the expedition. Among these species was the Arctic hare, which was given the scientific name Lepus arcticus by Leach. He distinguished it from the mountain hare (Lepus timidus), which was of comparable size, by the black hairs distributed across its body, as well as the black tips and insides of its ears.

There are four subspecies of this hare:

- Lepus arcticus arcticus
- Lepus arcticus bangsii
- Lepus arcticus groenlandicus
- Lepus arcticus monstrabilis

According to analysis by Leandro Iraçabal and colleagues in 2024, the Arctic hare's closest relatives are the broom hare (L. castroviejoi), Corsican hare (L. corsicanus), and the Alaskan hare (L. othus). The broom hare and Corsican hare are placed in a clade that is sister to the Arctic hare:

- - - - Lepus arcticus
      - - Lepus castroviejoi
        - Lepus corsicanus
    - Lepus othus
  - - Lepus timidus
    - Lepus townsendii
- Other hares

=== Fossil record and history ===
Arctic hare fossils are rare prior to the Holocene epoch, with fossils from the Last Glacial Period found in North America (Wisconsin glaciation) and Europe (Würm glaciation). No fossils from before the Holocene have been found in Russia. The Arctic hare persevered in refugia during periods of glaciation, which led to its differentiation from the Alaskan hare as each species was separated in different parts of North America. Evidence of the Arctic hare has been found in Greenland from 7,960 years ago, and it has colonized regions across the Bering Strait at least twice.

== Description ==
The Arctic hare is one of the largest living lagomorphs. Typically, this species measures from 43 to 70 cm (17 to 28 in) long, not counting a tail length of 4.5 to 10 cm (1.8 to 3.9 in). The body mass of this species is typically between 2.5–5.5 kg (6–12 lb), though large individuals can weigh up to 7 kg (15 lb).

=== Physiology ===
The Arctic hare has many physiological features that are adaptive to its extreme environment. Despite a 17% - 38% lower than expected basal metabolic rate, the Arctic hare is able to maintain a body temperature comparable to other lagomorphs (38.9 degrees C) because of its low surface area to volume ratio and high insulation. The lowered metabolic rate also allows the Arctic hare to save energy, making it adaptive for its cold and barren habitat. In addition, the Arctic hare has high locomotive efficiency combined with long periods of resting and shorter bouts of foraging which enables it to conserve energy and survive on its low diet intake.

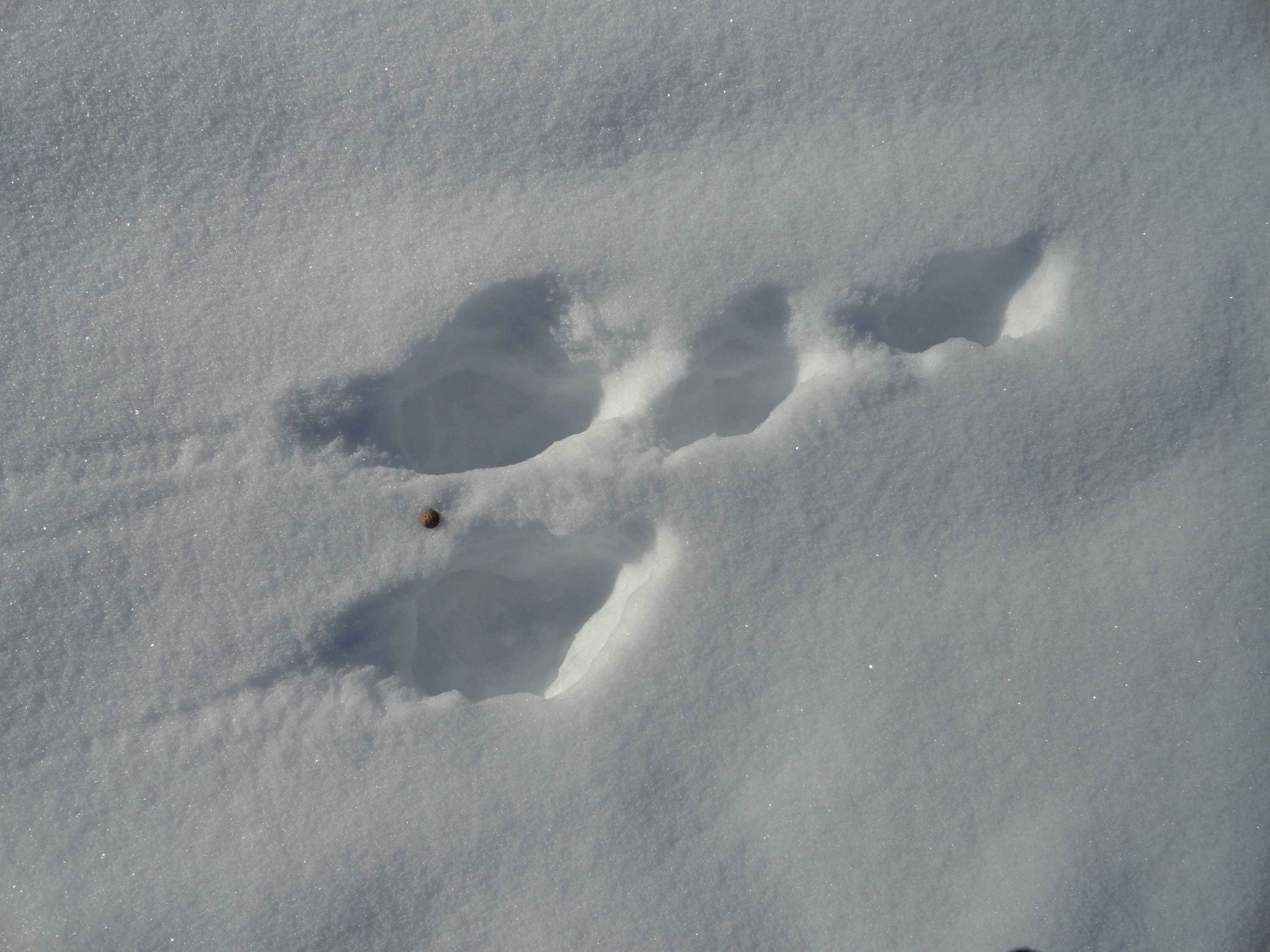
Arctic hare footprints on the snow

The white fur of Arctic hares, in addition to their camouflage benefits in the winter, have a high reflectance which may prevent excessive heat gain during the day. Behaviorally, the Arctic hare keeps warm in winter using body orientation, posture, and seeking or digging shelter. When resting, Arctic hares maintain a nearly spherical shape and typically stay in groups, but do not huddle. If the rabbits are solitary, they often rest in the shelter of large rocks protecting them from the wind and staying out of sight of predators. In addition to rocks, Arctic hares also find shelter in other natural shelters such as snowdrifts, man-made structures, and even digging their own burrows in snowdrifts up to 188 cm in length.

The body size of Arctic hares is often significantly less in the winter compared to the summer, likely caused by decreased food quality and availability in addition to a decreased metabolic rate. Arctic hare body mass might also be affected by ambient temperature. At lower latitudes it was found that Arctic hares in Greenland exhibited larger body size with increased temperature, possibly caused by increased energy availability to contribute to body size and increased food plant availability. The opposite is true at higher latitudes in which Arctic hares had smaller body sizes with increased temperature. This trend is again linked to food plant availability. In this case, decreased precipitation and increased temperatures in the higher latitudes of Greenland result in a lower food plant availability to contribute to body mass.

== Distribution and habitat ==
The Arctic hare is distributed over the northernmost regions of Greenland, the Canadian Arctic islands and Northern Canada, including Ellesmere Island, and farther south in Labrador and Newfoundland. The Arctic hare is well adapted to conditions found in the tundras, plateaus, and treeless coasts of this region, including cold weather and frozen precipitation. The Arctic hare may be found at elevations from sea level to 900 m (3,000 ft).

In Newfoundland and Southern Labrador, the Arctic hare changes its coat color, moulting and growing new fur, from brown or grey in the summer to white in the winter. This seasonal moulting also enables other Arctic animals, including ermine and ptarmigan, to remain camouflaged as the environment changes. However, the Arctic hares in the far north of Canada, where summer is very short, remain white all year round.

== Feeding ==
The Arctic hare is a herbivore, specifically a folivore. Arctic hares feed primarily on woody plants, with arctic willow constituting 95% of their diet year-round. Arctic hares predominantly consume saxifrage, crowberry, and dwarf willow, but can also eat a variety of other foods, including lichens and mosses, blooms, other species' leaves, twigs, and roots, mountain sorrel and macroalgae (seaweed). Arctic hare diets are more diverse in summer. Although previously believed to still be primarily willow, dryas, and grasses, recent studies show that their diet becomes dominated by legumes, constituting 70% of their diet in the summer. Arctic hares have been reported to occasionally eat meat, including fish and the stomach contents of eviscerated caribou. They eat snow to get water.

== Reproduction and lifespan ==
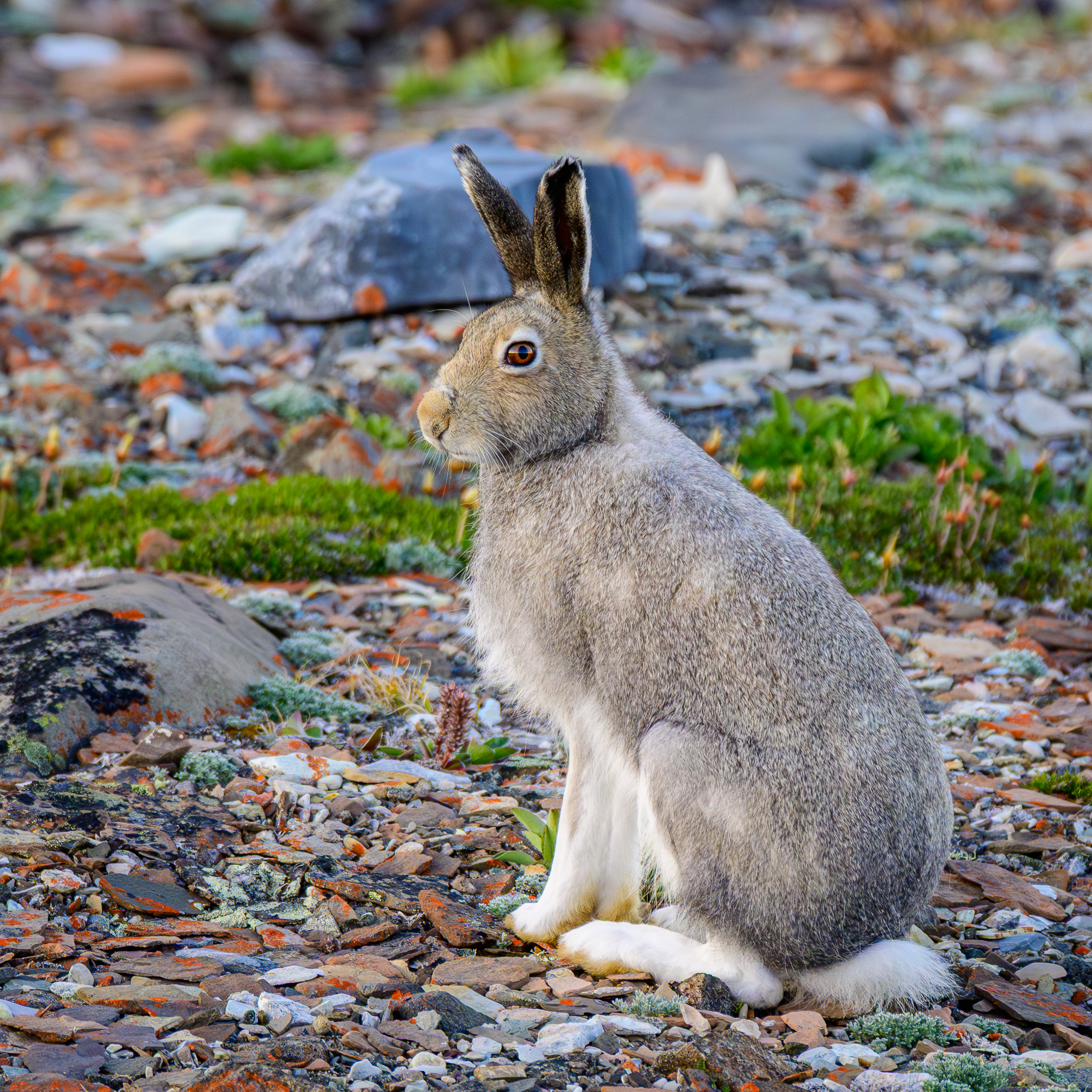
Summer coat, seen in Ulukhaktok, Canada

Breeding season occurs around April or May. Gestation period of the Arctic hare is 53 days, so the babies are born around May, June, or July. Hares can have up to eight babies (average litter size 5.4), called leverets. The leverets stay within the mother's home range until they can survive on their own. Young Arctic hares are almost full size by late July (some weeks after birth) and breed for the first time after a year of age.

There is little information on the lifespan of Arctic hares. Some anecdotal evidence suggests they live three to five years in the wild. Arctic hares do not fare well in captivity, living only a year and a half at most.

== Predators ==
Known predators of the Arctic hare are the Arctic fox (Vulpes lagopus), Red fox (Vulpes vulpes), Wolf (Canis lupus), Lynx (Lynx canadensis), Ermine (Mustela erminea), Snowy owl (Bubo scandiacus), Gyrfalcon (Falco rusticolus), Rough-legged hawk (Buteo lagopus) – and occasionally humans.

The Arctic wolf is probably the most successful predator of the Arctic hare, and even young wolves in their first autumn can catch adult hares. Arctic foxes and ermines, which are smaller, typically prey on young hares. Gyrfalcon carry hares to their nests, cutting them in half first; gyrfalcons use hare bones and feet in the structure of their nests on Ellesmere Island, Nunavut. Peregrine falcons (Falco peregrinus) also prey on Arctic hares in the southern end of the hares' range. The snowy owls mainly target young hares; the French common name of the species derives from Anglo-Saxon harfang ("hare-catcher").

Four groups of parasites have been known to use Arctic hares as a host: protozoans (Eimeria exigua, Eimeria magna, Eimeria perforans, and Eimeria sculpta); nematodes (including Filaria and Oxyuris ambigua); lice (including Haemodipsus lyriocephalus and Haemodipsus setoni) and fleas (including Euhoplopsyllus glacialis and Megabothris groenlandicus). Fleas are more common than parasitic worms.
