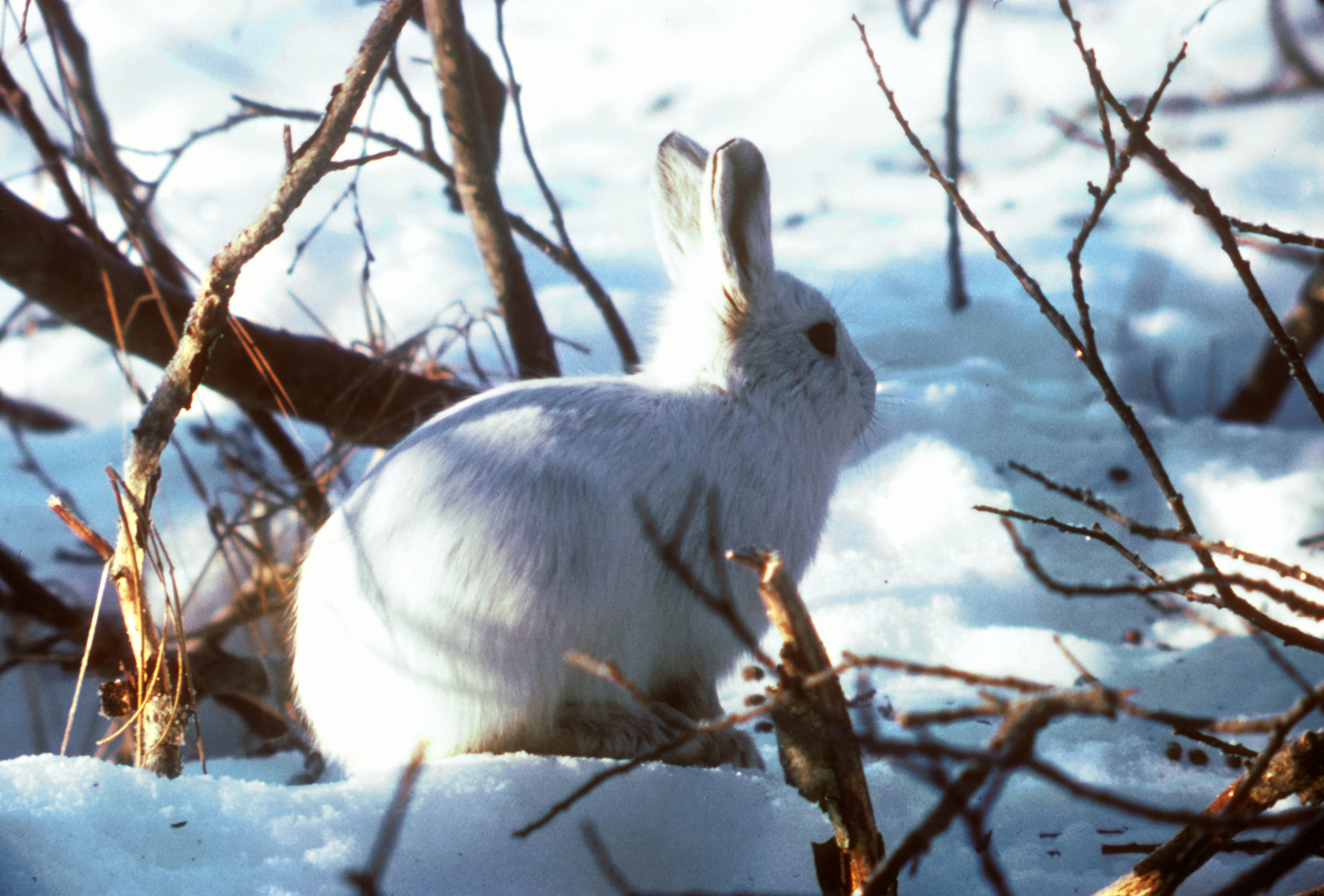

Conservation status
- Least Concern (IUCN 3.1)

Scientific classification
- Kingdom: Animalia
- Phylum: Chordata
- Class: Mammalia
- Order: Lagomorpha
- Family: Leporidae
- Genus: Lepus
- Species: L. othus

Binomial name
- Lepus othus Merriam, 1900

Subspecies
- L. o. othus Merriam, 1900; L. o. poadromus Merriam, 1900
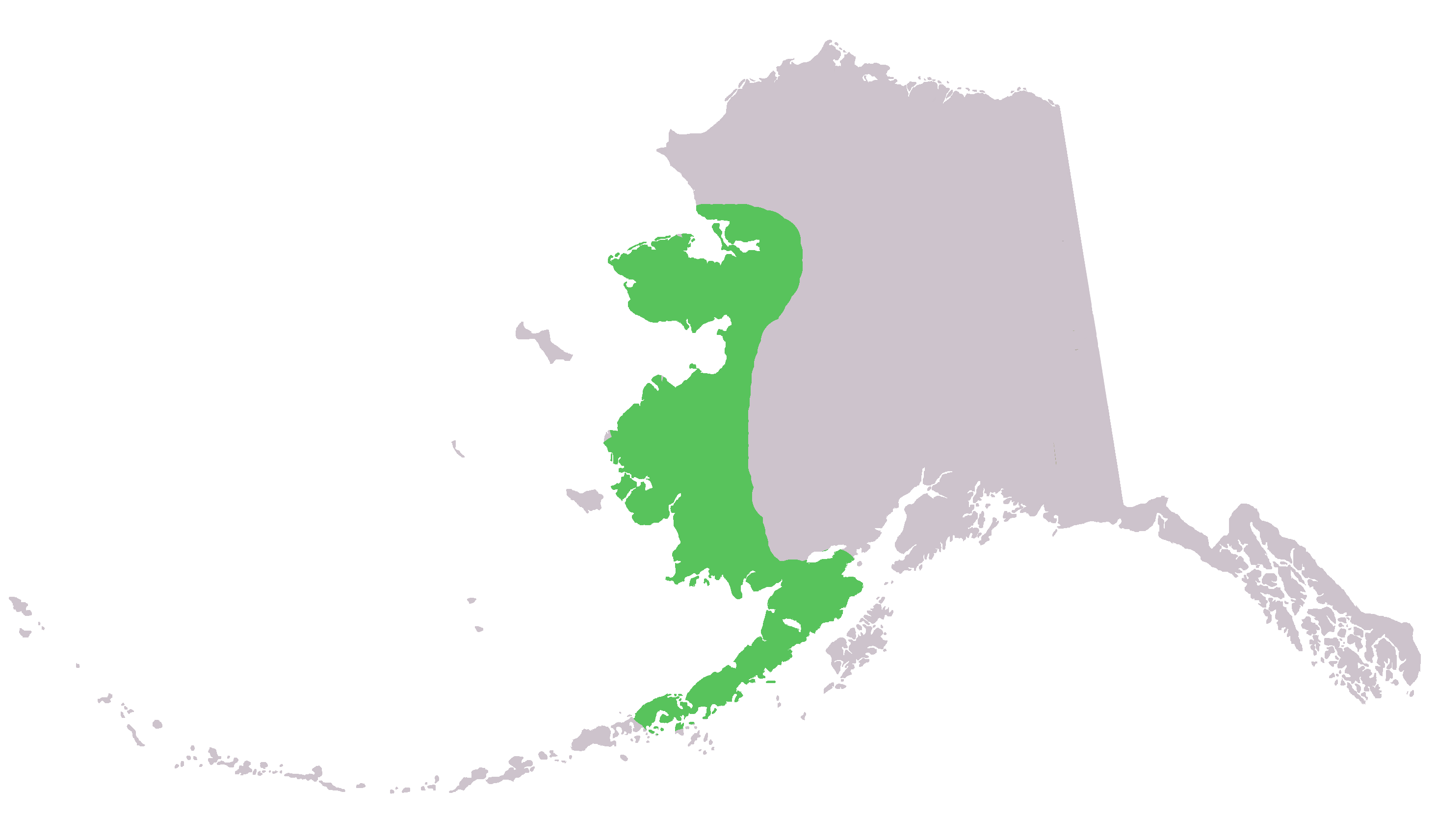

Synonyms
- List: Lepus timidus tschuktschorum Nordquist, 1883; Lepus tschukschorum Trouessart, 1897; Lepus poadromus C. H. Merriam, 1900; Lepus tschuktschorum G. M. Allen, 1914

= Alaskan hare =

Species of mammal

The Alaskan hare (Lepus othus), also known as the tundra hare, is a species of mammal in the family Leporidae. They do not dig burrows and are found in the open tundra of western Alaska and the Alaska Peninsula in the United States. They are solitary for most of the year except during mating season, when they produce a single litter of up to eight young. Predators include birds of prey (such as the snowy owl), lynx, mustelids and wolves, among other animals, as well as humans (typically hunted for food).

== Description ==
The Alaskan, or tundra, hare (Lepus othos) is one of the largest species of hares. They are one of two species of hares native to the state of Alaska, the other being the more widespread snowshoe hare (Lepus americanus). Both male and female adult Alaskan hares normally measure between 50–70 centimetres (20–28 in) in length, with the tail measuring up to an additional 8 centimetres (3.1 in). Their hind feet are 20 centimetres (7.9 in) long, which is thought to allow them to move easily in snowy conditions. It has also been reported that they utilize their feet for defense against predators, notably birds of prey, which attack from overhead. Lepus othos typically weighs between 2.9 to 7.2 kg (6.4 to 15.9 lb), with an average of 4.8 kg (11 lb), thus making it one of the largest lagomorphs, alongside the similarly sized Eurasian brown hare (L. europaeus), Arctic hare (L. arcticus) and the Asian desert hare (L. tibetanus). The Alaskan hare's ears are fairly short, compared to other hares. This is thought to be an evolutionary adaptation in order to conserve heat throughout the colder months. A hare's ears play an important role in thermoregulation. In the summer, Alaskan hares have a brown fur coat with white underparts. In the winter, they grow a white fur coat with black-tipped ears. Alaskan hares are known to be carriers of Francisella tularensis, a bacterium that causes an infectious disease known as tularemia, which can be transmitted to pets and humans. Tularemia symptoms include infectious or weepy sores, swollen lymph nodes, and fever or flu-like symptoms.

=== Breeding habits ===
The Alaskan hare is mostly solitary, and the species usually only congregates in groups during mating season in April and May. They will normally have one litter per year of between four and eight leverets, with the young born during June and July. The leverets are active shortly after birth, and are born with full coats and open eyes.

== Taxonomy ==
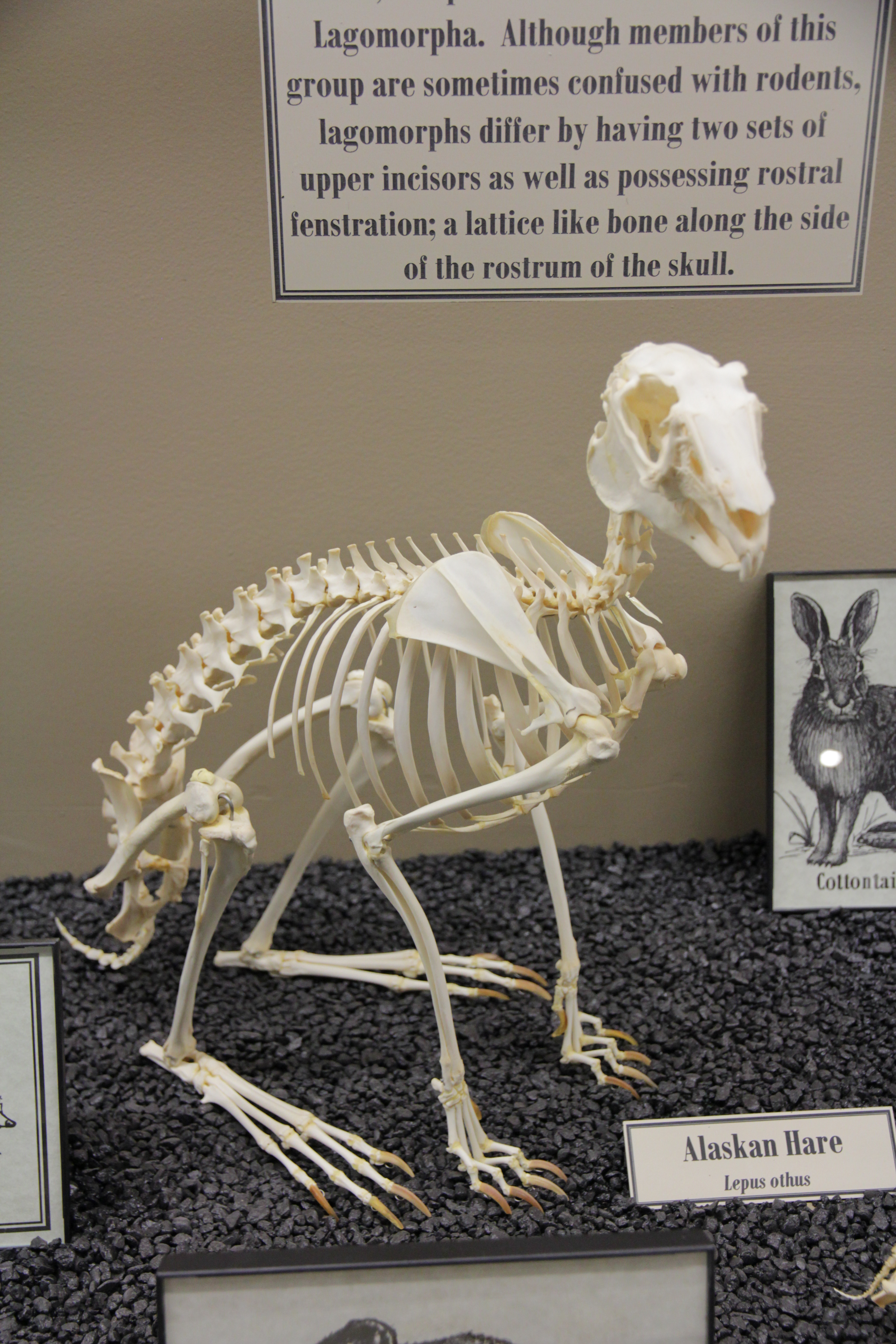
Alaskan hare skeleton on display at the Museum of Osteology

The Alaskan hare was first described as the "tundra polar hare" by the American mammalogist Clinton Hart Merriam in 1900. He published the hare's description alongside those of 25 other mammals from Alaska and British North America, which included another new species of hare, Lepus poadromus. his latter species, the "peninsula Arctic hare", was described as being similar to L. othus but smaller. It was later reclassified as a subspecies of the Alaskan hare by American zoologist Arthur Holmes Howell in 1936. The Alaskan hare's closest relatives are the Arctic hare, Lepus arcticus, of northern Canada and Greenland, and the mountain hare, Lepus timidus, of northern Eurasia, from which the Alaskan hare is geographically isolated.

=== Subspecies ===
The Alaskan hare is divided into two recognized subspecies that occupy distinct geographical regions and environments within Alaska:

- Lepus othus othus (Alaskan Tundra hare): This subspecies is primarily found in the northern and western coastal tundra regions, as well as alluvial plains across the state.
- Lepus othus poadromus (Alaskan Peninsula hare): This subspecies typically inhabits the southwestern regions of Alaska, specifically concentrated around the open tundra and coastal areas of the Alaska Peninsula.

== Habitat and diet ==
They do not live in burrows, but instead nest in open sites. They are most commonly found in upland tundra or in rocky or brushy areas which provide camouflage and protection from predators. Their range includes western and southwestern Alaska, including the Alaska Peninsula. They are herbivores, eating a variety of foliage and fruits, with foraging taking place primarily at dawn and dusk. Alaskan hares also feed on green plants in the summer, and bark and twigs in the winter. Predators include foxes, polar bears, wolverines, weasels, and birds of prey. They are taken opportunistically by humans for food or for their fur. Their fur can be and is used to line shoes and robes in Alaska.
