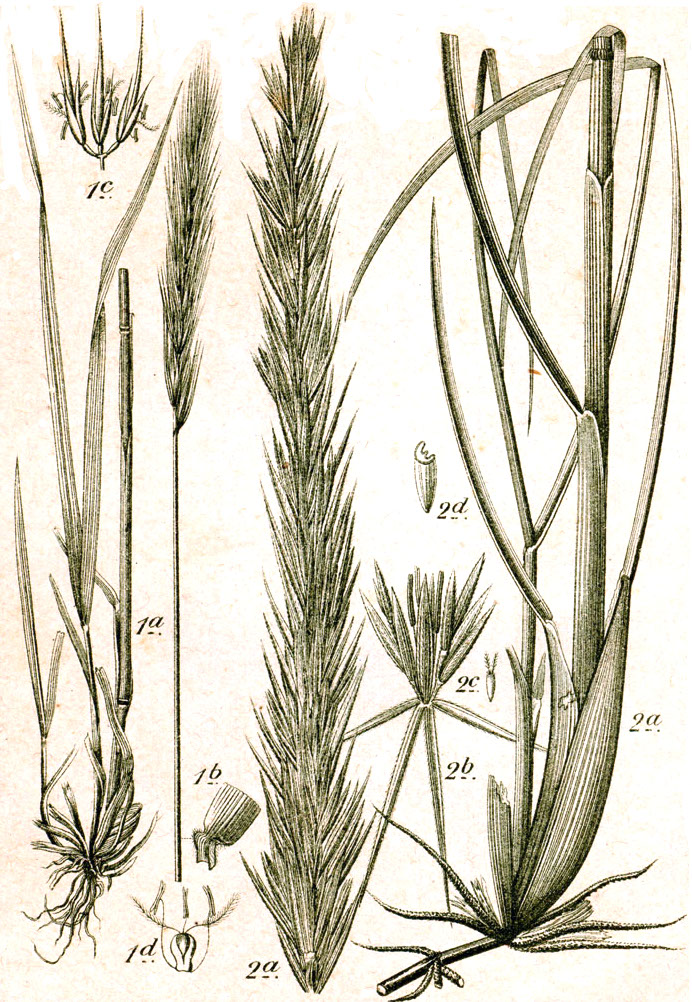

Scientific classification
- Kingdom: Plantae
- Clade: Tracheophytes
- Clade: Angiosperms
- Clade: Monocots
- Clade: Commelinids
- Order: Poales
- Family: Poaceae
- Subfamily: Pooideae
- Supertribe: Triticodae
- Tribe: Triticeae
- Genus: Heteranthelium; Hochst. ex Jaub. & Spach
- Species: H. piliferum

Binomial name
- Heteranthelium piliferum (Sol.) Hochst. ex Jaub. & Spach

Synonyms
- Elymus pilifer Sol.; Agropyron piliferum (Sol.) Benth. ex Aitch.; Triticum olgae Regel; Eremopyrum olgae (Regel) P.Candargy; Heteranthelium aleppicum Gand.; Heteranthelium assyriacum Gand.; Heteranthelium hermoneum Gand.

= Heteranthelium =

Genus of grasses

Heteranthelium is a genus of Asian plants in the grass family. The only known species is Heteranthelium piliferum, native to Central Asia, Afghanistan, Pakistan, Iran, Middle East, Turkey, and the Caucasus.
