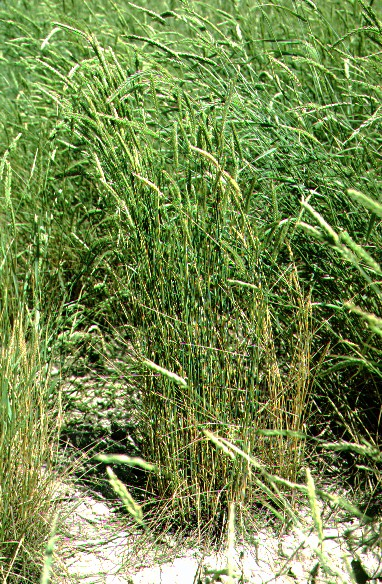

Scientific classification
- Kingdom: Plantae
- Clade: Tracheophytes
- Clade: Angiosperms
- Clade: Monocots
- Clade: Commelinids
- Order: Poales
- Family: Poaceae
- Subfamily: Pooideae
- Genus: Agropyron
- Species: A. fragile

Binomial name
- Agropyron fragile (Roth) P.Candargy

Synonyms
- List: Agropyron cristatum subsp. fragile (Roth) A. Löve; Agropyron cristatum var. fragile (Roth) Dorn; Agropyron fragile var. sibiricum (Willd.) Tzvelev; Agropyron fragile ssp. sibiricum (Willd.) Melderis; Agropyron sibiricum (Willd.) Beauv.

= Agropyron fragile =

Species of grass

Agropyron fragile (Siberian wheatgrass) is a species of plant in the family Poaceae.
