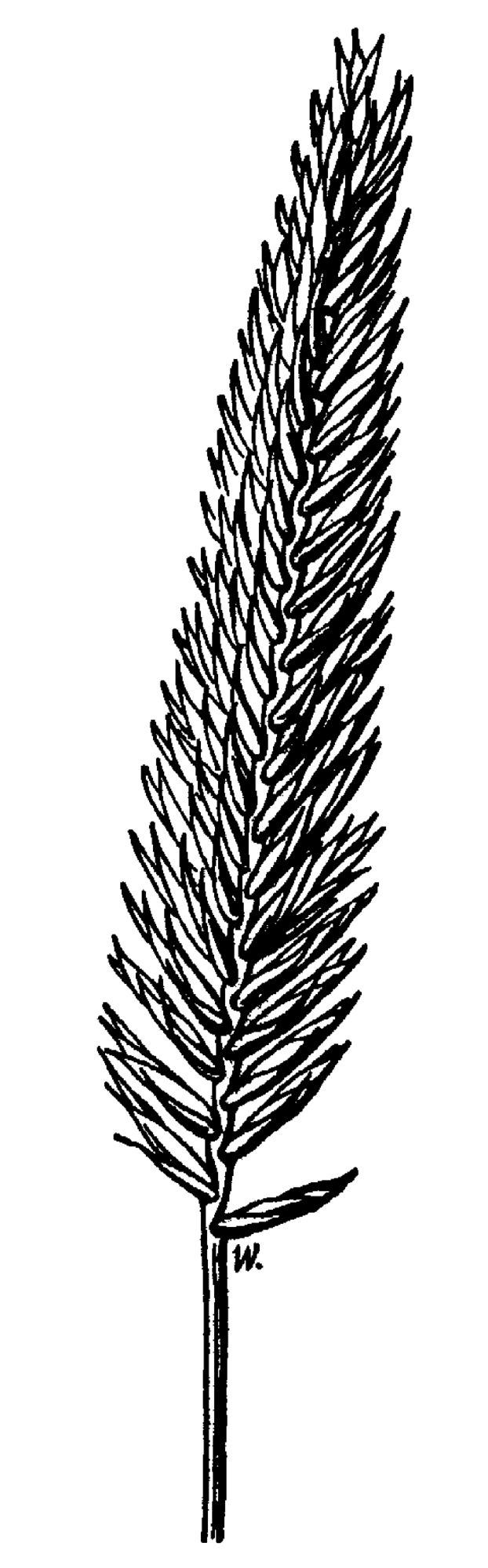

Scientific classification
- Kingdom: Plantae
- Clade: Tracheophytes
- Clade: Angiosperms
- Clade: Monocots
- Clade: Commelinids
- Order: Poales
- Family: Poaceae
- Subfamily: Pooideae
- Genus: Agropyron
- Species: A. desertorum

Binomial name
- Agropyron desertorum (Fisch. ex Link) J.A.Schultes

= Agropyron desertorum =

Species of grass

Agropyron desertorum (clustered wheat grass, desert crested wheatgrass, desert wheatgrass, standard crested wheatgrass; syn. Agropyron cristatum subsp. desertorum (Fisch. ex Link) A. Löve, Agropyron cristatum var. desertorum (Fisch. ex Link) Dorn) is a plant species in the family Poaceae which was originally from Russian and Siberian steppes until it was introduced to the United States from there between 1907 and 1913. Prior to its introduction it was believed that Desert wheatgrass and crested wheatgrass are different species. Currently it can still be found in Central and Western United States, except for Idaho, Kansas, Louisiana, Minnesota, Oklahoma, and Washington.

== Agricultural significance ==
Agropyron desertorum is a perennial crop that is grown in areas across North America. Since it can be regrown over many years, A. desertorum has become a useful crop within the agricultural field. This plant species is a type of crested wheatgrass that is used as a common grazing crop. It is especially used for beef cattle that are raised for human food production. A study was performed to test the specific cattle grazing preferences for different types of crested wheatgrass. Diploid cultivars of crested wheatgrasses were compared to tetraploid cultivars of Agropyron desertorum. The varying ploidy numbers of the plants resulted in inherent differences between the plants and subsequently, specific grazing preferences for the cattle. The study showed that the cattle significantly preferred the tetraploid cultivars for grazing, as opposed to the diploid cultivars. Thus, Agropyron desertorum can be used to better raise beef cattle and increase pasture utilization on the cattle farms.

== Growth and development ==
This particular species of wheatgrass is resilient to temperate climate changes, especially through the varying rainfall that occurs in the Great Basin of North America. During the growing season of Agropyron desertorum there is rapid rainfall in the Great Basin, and it has been found that this plant species can positively respond to this temporary increase in water. Agropyron desertorum is still capable of nitrogen uptake, even during the stressful times of its growing season, and it is able to survive and continue to grow.

Although Agropyron desertorum can grow in climates with a lot of rainfall, it can also grow in areas that are much drier. Plants that are grown on dry lands, however, have the risk of experiencing the agricultural problem of salinity stress. It is when there is an elevated level of solutes within the soil that inhibit the growth and metabolic capabilities of crops. Salinity stress is a problem that affects A. desertorum in the more semiarid parts of North America. Certain traits of Agropyron desertorum, however, allow it to overcome the stress from salinity. For example, A. desertorum plants with greater root length, plumule length, seed length, and seed vigor have been found to germinate and tolerate salinity better during the seedling stage. Agropyron desertorum plants with these conditions can be selected for and grown within drier areas, to allow for better crop production of this crested wheatgrass.

Since Agropyron desertorum is a very versatile and resilient crop, it also has the potential to be grown in areas it is not native to. It can emerge and grow over a broad range of soil water, and is a very adaptable plant. It is especially able to grow in areas with bare and exposed mineral soil, which can even lead it to become invasive in certain areas. The ability of Agropyron desertorum to be grown in so many different environments makes it a very resourceful perennial crop.

== Evolutionary development ==
Artificial and natural selective pressures can result in differentiation between the wild and modern cultivars for a species. For Agropyron desertorum, however, the genetic diversity in the modern cultivars is still similar to the wild progenitors, as seen by the mean percentage of polymorphic loci and mean expected heterozygosity. Analysis has showed that there is little differentiation between the wild and modern cultivars (Fst = 0.06), showing that selective pressures have not caused much of a developmental change within modern Agropyron desertorum.

== Distribution ==
- Western United States
