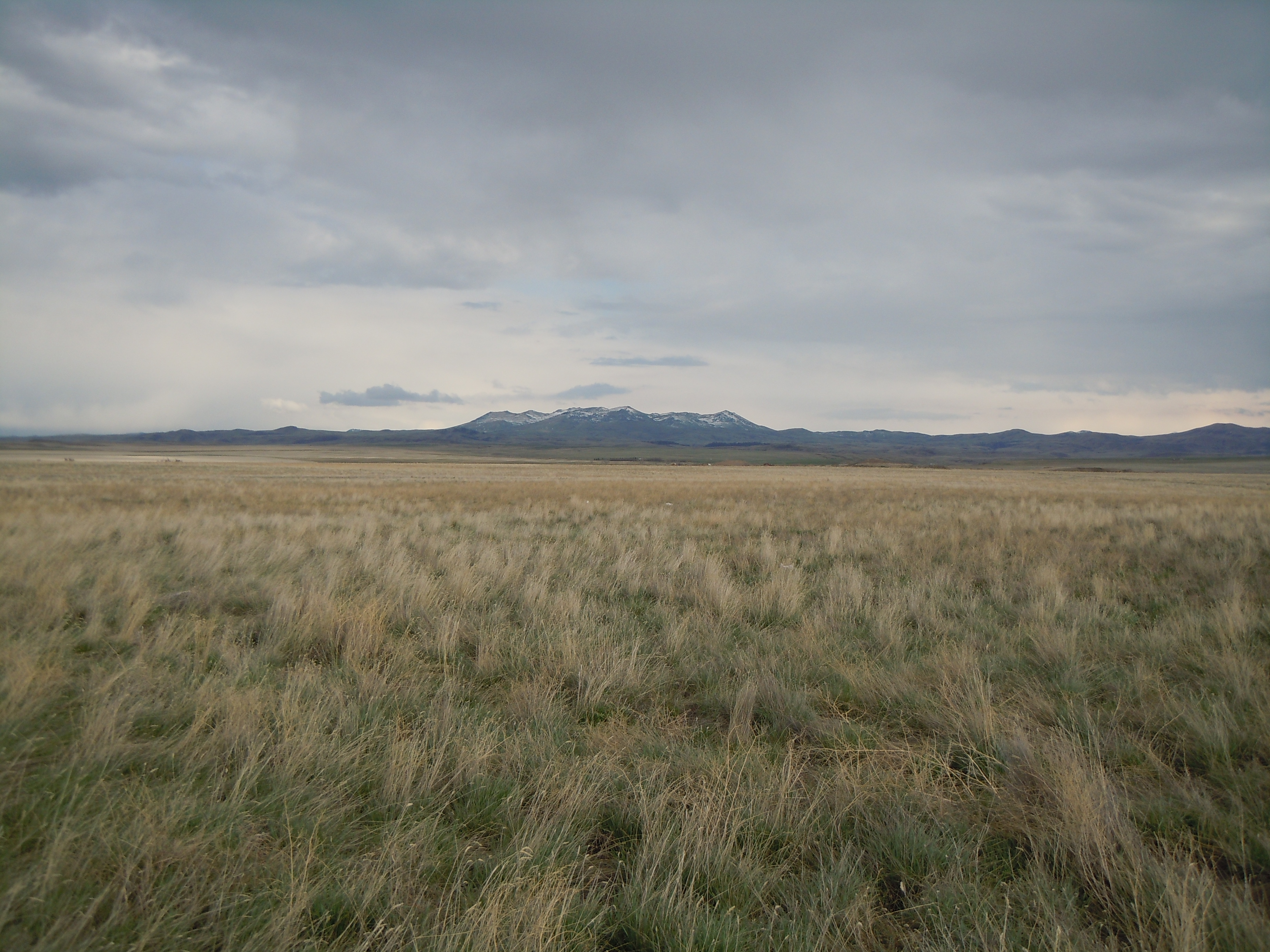
- Nonnative A. cristatum established in Montana, USA

Scientific classification
- Kingdom: Plantae
- Clade: Tracheophytes
- Clade: Angiosperms
- Clade: Monocots
- Clade: Commelinids
- Order: Poales
- Family: Poaceae
- Subfamily: Pooideae
- Genus: Agropyron
- Species: A. cristatum

Binomial name
- Agropyron cristatum (L.) Gaertn.

Synonyms
- Agropyron pectinatum (M.Bieb.) P.Beauv.

= Agropyron cristatum =

Species of grass

Agropyron cristatum, the crested wheat grass, crested wheatgrass, fairway crested wheat grass, is a species in the family Poaceae. This plant is often used as forage and erosion control. It is well known as a widespread introduced species on the prairies of the United States and Canada.

== History ==
Agropyron cristatum is one of several closely related grass species referred to as crested wheatgrass. It is unable to hybridize with its similar relatives, as it is a diploid species, whereas its closest relative, Agropyron desertorum, is a tetraploid species. It was introduced from Russia and Siberia to North America in the first half of the twentieth century, and widely used to reseed abandoned marginal cropland undergoing varying degrees of soil erosion and secondary succession. A. cristatum is very long lived, with stands often remaining productive for 30 years or more.

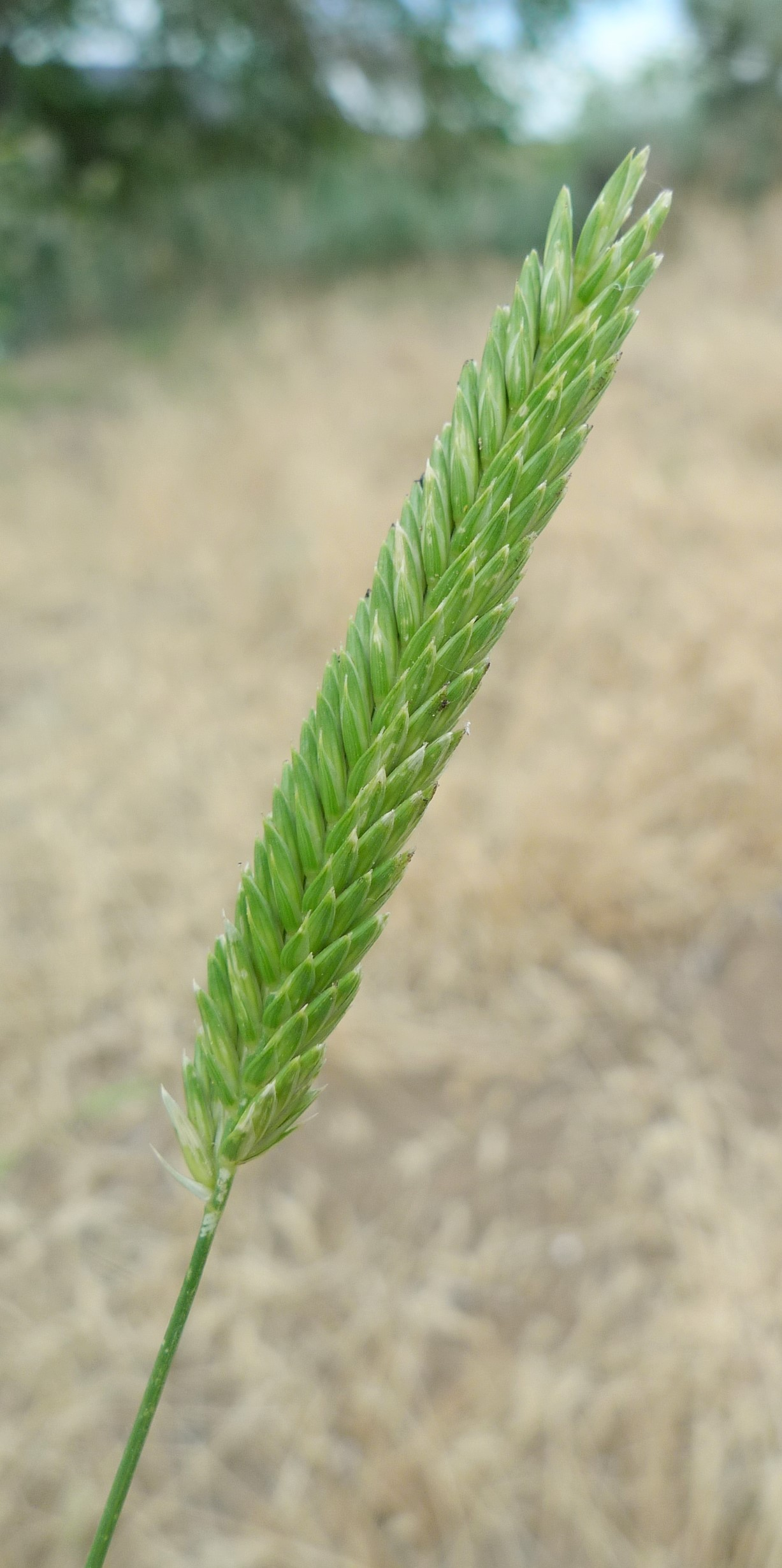
Agropyron cristatum inflorescence

== Description ==
Agropyron cristatum is a densely tufted grass, with culms ranging from 30 to 50 cm high at maturity. Its sheaths are scabrous or the lowest ones pubescent. Its blades are up to 8 mm wide and scabrous to pubescent above. Its spikes are flat and range from 2–7 cm long, with spikelets ranging from 8–15 mm long, being 3–5-flowered, densely crowded, and spreading to ascending. Its glumes are 4–6 mm long, awn-tipped, and its lemmas are 6–8 mm long and either awnless or awn-tipped.

Agropyron cristatum is known among other grasses and wheats for its relatively high granivory. Granivory, or granivores, describe the interaction between animals and seeds. Agropyron cristatum's high granivory indicates that animals feed on the seeds of the plant as their primary, or even exclusive, food source. Although this raises concerns about the plant's continued ability to reproduce if its seeds are all being consumed, the high granivory of this species does indicate that Agropyron cristatum is an important food source.

== Habitat ==
Agropyron cristatum is best adapted to dry rangeland conditions and is most frequently found in such circumstances. It prefers from 23 to 38 cm of precipitation per year, but can tolerate more moisture on favourable sites, extending its range into tundra and taiga conditions and elevations up to 2000 m above sea level in the southern portions of its adapted area. It prefers well drained, deep, loamy soils of medium and moderately coarse texture, including Chernozemic, Solonetzic, Regosolic, Brunisolic and Luvisolic soils. A. cristatum can tolerate salinity in the range of 5 to 15 mS/cm and prefers moderately alkaline conditions. It has low to medium fertility requirements. It will not tolerate prolonged flooding.

Agropyron cristatum is the most shade-tolerant of the crested wheatgrasses, but does best in open conditions. A. cristatum is extremely drought tolerant. It achieves this drought tolerance by starting growth very early in the season, then going dormant from seed set until fall when it will exhibit vegetative regrowth if moisture is sufficient.

A recent study has shown that invasive populations of Agropyron cristatum have spread across the upper U.S. as well as southern Canada, and the invading Agropyron cristatum populations have been found to have a higher granivory than native grasslands and they maintain dominance even when native grassland species are reintroduced. This current study indicated that the increased granivory of Agropyron cristatum did not contribute to its competitive success. The study did show that although A. cristatum was found to have higher granivory, after 2 years the difference between A. cristatum's granivory and that of native species lessens, and that there was no apparent preference among the animals for either wheat. Therefore, the factors responsible for Agropyron cristatum's high granivore content are still relatively unknown.

Agropyron cristatum is very tolerant of grazing, although under dry conditions new stands should be protected from grazing for at least two years as the seedling are slow to develop. A. cristatum can be damaged by several fungi, including leaf and stripe rusts, snow mold and some arthropods including black grass bugs (Labops sp.) in pure plantings.

Due to the nature of growth in the Agropyron cristatum, it is an ideal grass type for reclamation of large areas, and even though it is ideal for drought-prone environments, it can also act as ground cover in places that may experience higher rainfall, with root systems stabilizing topsoil and limiting the impact of such components on the environment.

== Uses ==
Agropyron cristatum has been bred into many cultivars selected for attributes ranging from forage yield to drought tolerance to turf types that will exhibit more pronounced degrees of rhizomatous growth habit. It has been and continues to be, widely used in both agricultural and industrial reclamation activities.

Agropyron cristatum is known among other grasses and wheats for its relatively high granivory. Granivory describe the interaction between animals and seeds. Agropyron cristatum's high granivory indicates that animals feed on the seeds of the plant as their primary, or even exclusive, food source. Although this raises concerns about the plant's continued ability to reproduce if its seeds are all being consumed, the high granivory of this species does indicate that Agropyron cristatum is an important food source. Studies have been conducted in search of the cause of Agropyron cristatum's increased granivory, but as of yet a high relative granivory has not been proven to be a unique characteristic of A. cristatum, and could actually be attributed to factors other than the plant's genome, such as environmental conditions.

One promising factor that could lead to, and be responsible for, increased granivore in Agropyron cristatum is a certain genetic difference found on chromosome 6 of plants with a higher granivore content. Plants with a translocation on chromosome 6P yield wheat of greater weight and longer spike length than those without the mutation. Agropyron cristatum possesses higher tiller number, higher floret numbers, and greater resistance to various pathogens such as wheat rusts, powdery mildew, and barley yellow dwarf virus than many of its close wheat relatives. It has been used to cross-breed with other species of grass and wheat to transfer a greater disease resistance to them, as well as enhance their properties as a food source. This cross-breeding involves the transferring of the chromosome 6P translocation to the species it is cross-breeding with. Chromosome 6P of A. cristatum has also been proven to play an important role in regulating fertile tiller number and it possesses positive and negative regulators of tiller number. These regulators were specifically found to be on the 6PS and 6PL chromosome arms. High floret numbers and number of kernals per spike is controlled by genes located on chromosome 6P of Agropyron cristatum. Agropyron cristatum’s genes can be used to instill leaf resistance in other species of wheat. Three backcrosses between Agropyron cristatum and Aegilops tauschii produces a number stable, fertile lines of Aegilops tauschii that then has resistance to leaf rust. Also, multi-spike cultivars of A. cristatum have been found to be more stable agronomically and achieve higher yields than cultivars with large-spike type.

It is an easy grass to establish by seed, having both high germination rates and high seedling vigour. It also establishes rapidly relative to many other grasses. Under non-irrigated conditions in low precipitation areas, Crested Wheatgrasses are consistently some of, if not the, highest yielding and persistent of domestic forage grasses. However, A. cristatum is lower yielding, although it is slightly more palatable, relative to other Crested Wheatgrasses.

Agropyron cristatum shows an immense toughness to a wide range of environmental conditions. Agropyron cristatum can be grown in cold temperatures, drought conditions, and relatively high amounts of salinity. It also has a resistance to barley yellow dwarf, wheat streak mosaic viruses, and leaf rust disease as well as containing high protein content.

Agropyron cristatum is a highly competitive and persistent plant in drier areas, and has a moderate ability to spread by seed. As such, its use in and adjacent to remaining natural grassland communities within its adapted areas in outside its native Eurasian distribution has come under criticism as a factor in natural grassland biodiversity loss, although the subject is still being studied. One such fear is that its seedlings' emergence does not decrease under herbicide treatment.

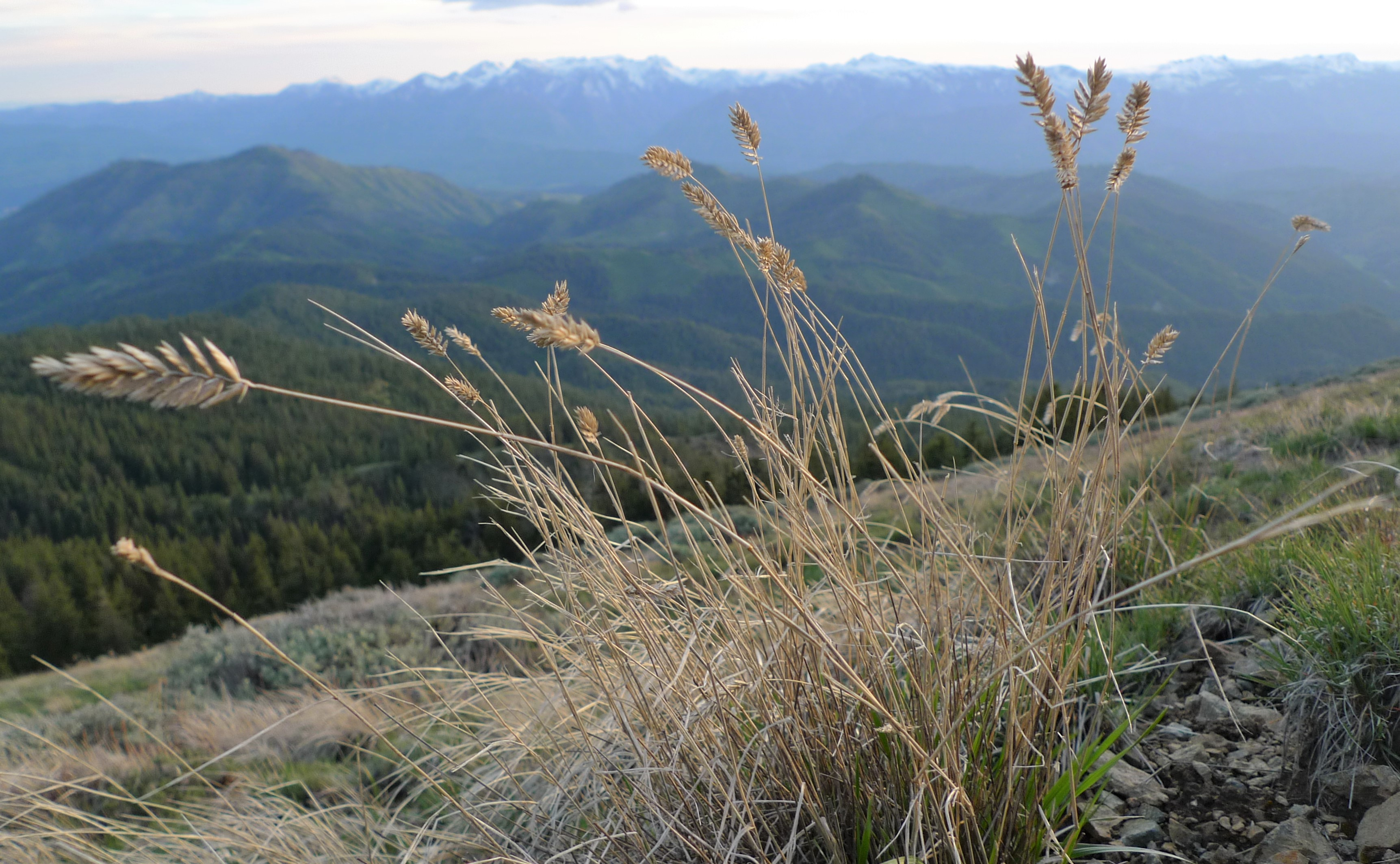
Agropyron cristatum, a non-native grass species seeded on a mountaintop fireline in central Washington

== Tenacity ==
The importance of Agropyron cristatum is often undermined, as the plant has not been domesticated for modern agricultural use. Agropyron cristatum’s ability to withstand various environmental and biological blighting makes it a truly unique and valuable organism. Recent studies highlight the importance of A. cristatum in future agricultural development because it exhibits several desirable traits for the improvement of domesticated wheat. While some of these traits may be related to yield production of the wheat, other significant traits include biotic and abiotic stress resistance genes that enable A. cristatum to grow proficiently. The importance of this knowledge is that researchers can use this genetic information regarding stress resistance genes to introduce new desirable traits in other domesticated wheat species that aid their growth in harsh environments. Ultimately, this leads to better yields for more human consumption.

The phenotypic success that Agropyron cristatum experiences is primarily due to the success of its root system. Recent studies show how root development contributes to the competitiveness of A. cristatum by testing its ability to flourish over other forms of vegetation in grassland environments. These studies provide data on how long the roots grow and how concentrated soil volume becomes with roots of A. cristatum. The results shows that A. cristatum typically allocates more of its biomass in its roots than its shoots when compared to other grassland species. Interpretation of this data suggests that because A. cristatum has a better foundation, it can outcompete other species for resources. These reports give significant insights into why A. cristatum is so competitive and why the development of this species could be a valuable asset to the food production as a perennial plant that is very competitive with its roots. In addition to this data, new research implies that whatever genes are enabling the roots to beat out the competition are homogeneous in nature (therefore more easily passed down through generations) and is the reason the species is as dominant. Once these genes become identified, agriculturalists can seek to implement them into genetically modified versions of wheat species to create a more durable and successful domesticated wheat species in our limited environment.

Today, researchers can annotate important functional genes that may be valuable for human use in the field of agriculture. This can be accomplished by utilizing next-generation sequencing techniques to analyze transcriptomes and genomes. Studies show that A. cristatum contains an abundance of protein family domains including nucleotide-binding domain-ARC (NB-ARC), AP2 domains, Myb family transcription factors (Myb), and late embryogenesis abundant (LEA) proteins that are all stress resistance genes. Specifically, NB-ARC proteins deal with general immune resistances, AP2 domains relate to cold temperature and drought resistance, Myb proteins also aid in drought resistance but also help in salinity stress, and LEA genes generally involve resistance from other abiotic stresses. With this information, the next step is to actually introduce versions of these desirable genes into domesticated species. The results from a 2013 study displays the effects of introducing translocations between those desirable traits from A. cristatum to modern wheat species. Using the method of intergenic translocations, the research shows that successful integrations have been completed and that those plants do in fact grow normally as well. Another method from a successful 2015 study involves the use of intergenic hybridization to introduce resistance genes associated with leaf rust. To sum up, the numerous biotic and abiotic resistance genes that A. cristatum presents leads to the success of the species which could and can be applied to modern day food production of the wheat domesticated species.
