= Crithopsis =

Scientific classification
- Kingdom: Plantae
- Clade: Tracheophytes
- Clade: Angiosperms
- Clade: Monocots
- Clade: Commelinids
- Order: Poales
- Family: Poaceae
- Subfamily: Pooideae
- Supertribe: Triticodae
- Tribe: Triticeae
- Genus: Crithopsis; Jaub. & Spach
- Species: C. delileana

Binomial name
- Crithopsis delileana (Schult.) Roshev.

Synonyms
- Elymus delileanus Schult.; Elymus aegyptiacus Spreng.; Hordeum delileanum (Schult.) Hack.; Elymus subulatus Forssk.; Elymus geniculatus Delile, illegitimate homonym; Crithopsis rhachitricha Jaub. & Spach; Elymus rhachitrichus Hochst. ex Jaub. & Spach; Crithopsis brachytricha Walp., alternate spelling; Elymus brachytrichus Walp.; Hordeum geniculatum Thell., illegitimate homonym; Agropyron cretense Coustur. & Gand.; Eremopyrum cretense (Coustur. & Gand.) Nevski

Genus of grasses

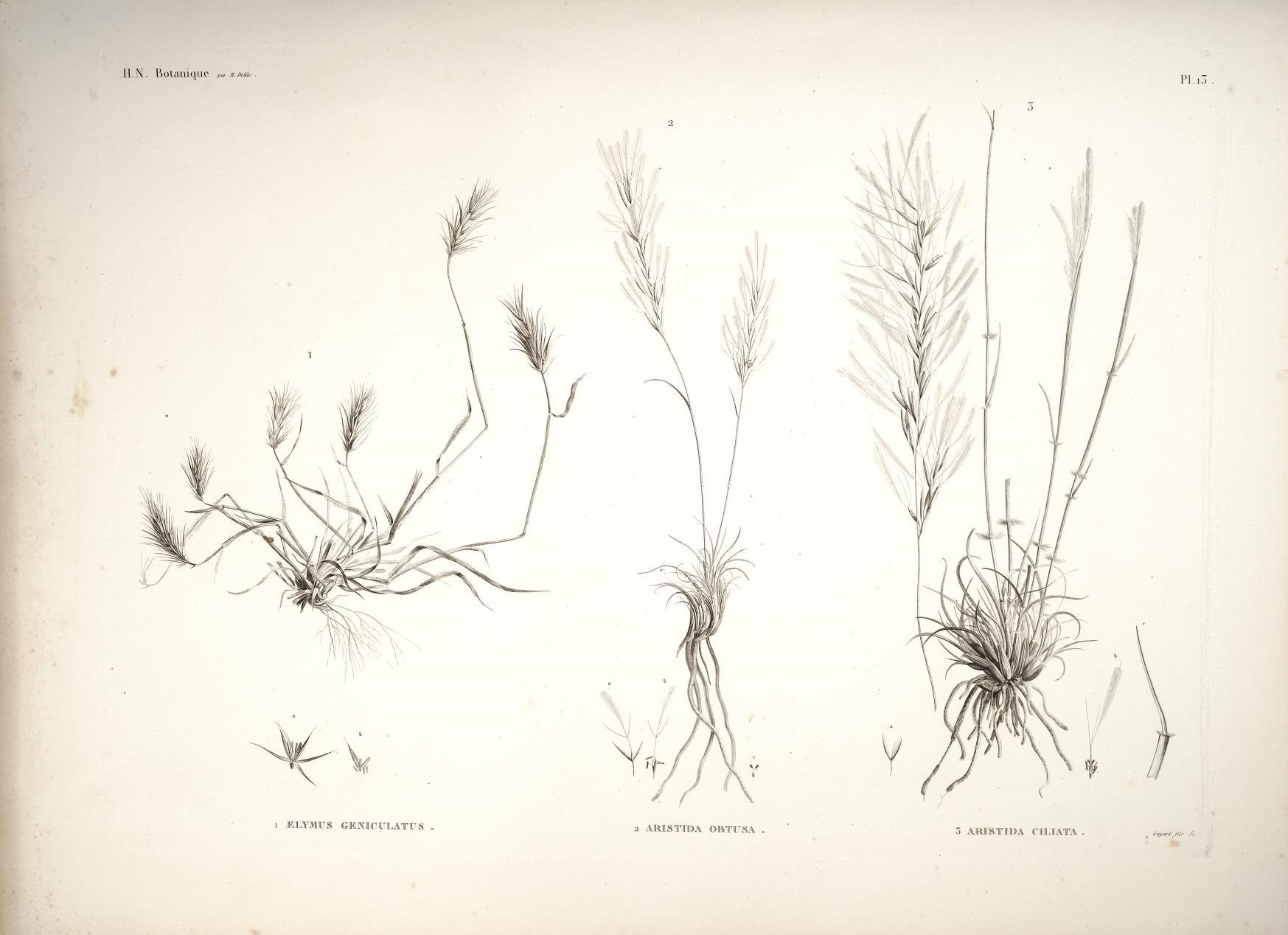
An illustration of Crithopsis delileana as found in Egypt

Crithopsis is a genus of plants in the grass family, native to the Mediterranean and nearby areas.

Species

The only known species is Crithopsis delileana, native to Morocco, Tunisia, Libya, Egypt, Crete, Turkey, Lebanon, Syria, Israel, Palestine, Jordan, Iraq, and Iran.
