= Eastern Cascades Slopes and Foothills =

Temperate coniferous forests ecoregion of the United States

Eastern Cascades Slopes and Foothills ecoregion
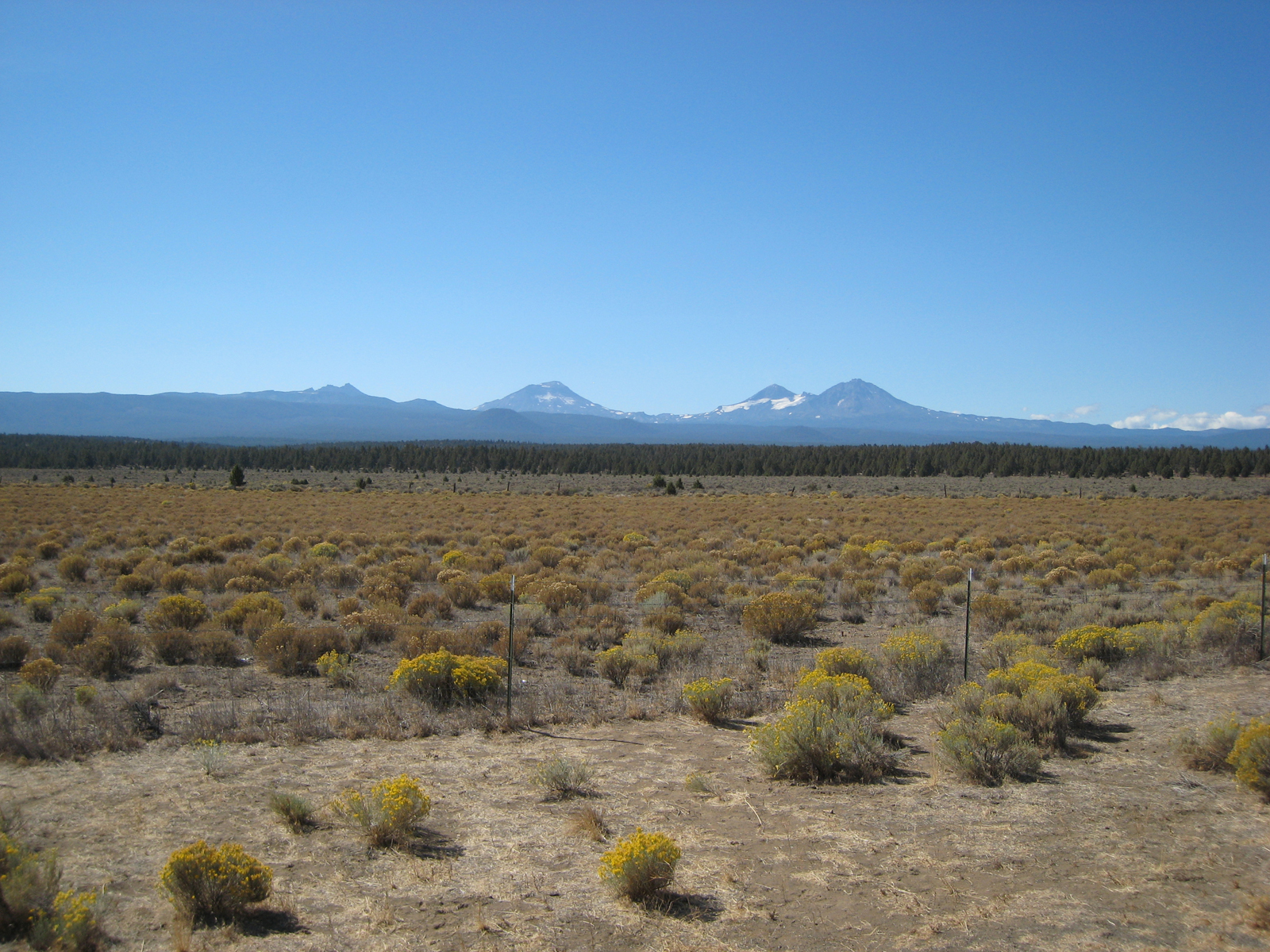
- The Pumice Plateau, looking west toward the Oregon Cascade Volcanoes

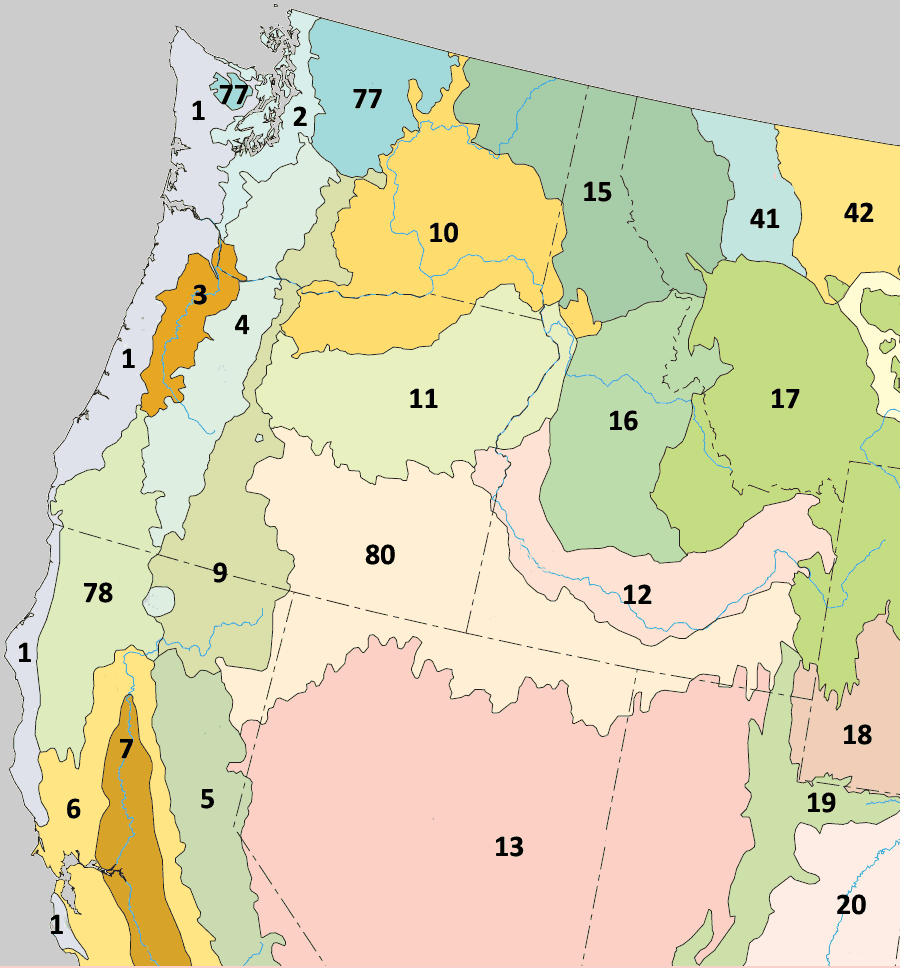
- Eastern Cascades Slopes and Foothills (9)

Ecology
- Realm: Nearctic
- Biome: Temperate coniferous forests
- Borders: List: Cascades (4); Sierra Nevada (5); Columbia Plateau (10); Blue Mountains (11); North Cascades (77); Klamath Mountains (78); Northern Basin and Range (80)

Geography
- Country: United States
- States: Oregon; Washington; California
- Coordinates: 44.0°N 122.0°W

The Eastern Cascades Slopes and Foothills ecoregion is a Level III ecoregion designated by the United States Environmental Protection Agency (EPA) in the U.S. states of Washington, Oregon, and California. In the rain shadow of the Cascade Range, the eastern side of the mountains experiences greater temperature extremes and receives less precipitation than the west side. Open forests of ponderosa pine and some lodgepole pine distinguish this region from the Cascades ecoregion, where hemlock and fir forests are more common, and from the lower, drier ecoregions to the east, where shrubs and grasslands are predominant. The vegetation is adapted to the prevailing dry, continental climate and frequent wildfire. Volcanic cones and buttes are common in much of the region.

== Level IV ecoregions ==
The ecoregion has been subdivided into ten Level IV ecoregions. As Level IV mapping is not yet complete in California, information is only included for the sections in Washington and Oregon.

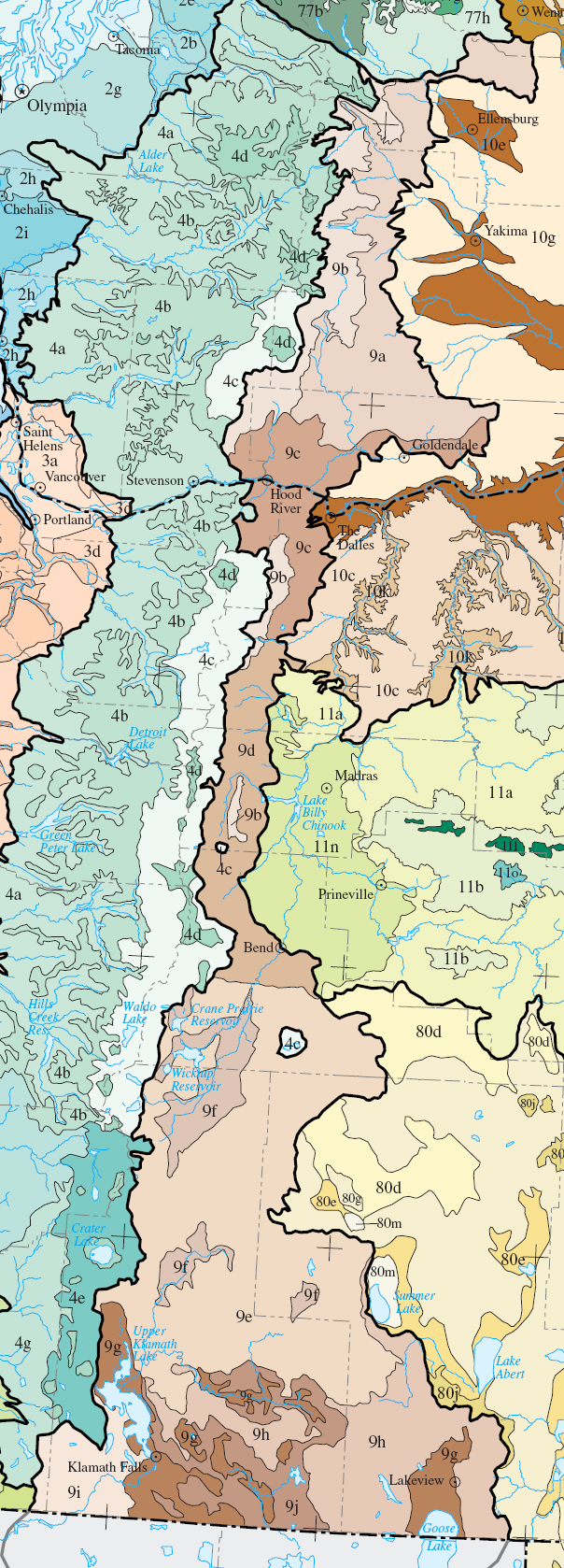
The Level III ecoregion has been broken down into ten Level IV ecoregions (with California not yet mapped), alphabetically coded by their northernmost instance. (State borders are indicated by a dotted line.)

=== Yakima Plateau and Slopes (9a) ===
The high, unglaciated Yakima Plateau and Slopes ecoregion is characterized by plateaus, buttes, and canyons, with medium to high gradient permanent and intermittent streams and rivers on a surface of basalt. Natural springs occur, especially in the south. The elevation varies from 2,500 to 5,000 feet (760 to 1,500 m). The dry continental climate supports open woodlands dominated by ponderosa pine and bitterbrush, with some Douglas-fir and Oregon white oak. Fire is an integral part of the ecosystem. The region covers 1,793 square miles (4,640 km^{2}) in Washington, mainly on land belonging to the Yakama Nation.

=== Grand Fir Mixed Forest (9b) ===
The Grand Fir Mixed Forest ecoregion is characterized by high, glaciated plateaus, mountains, and canyons containing high gradient streams and rivers. Scattered lakes occur in glacial rock basins. Elevation varies from 2,200 to 6,500 ft (670 to 1,980 m). The frigid soils and snowy, continental climate support a mix of grand fir and Douglas-fir, with some ponderosa pine and western larch. Plants in the understory include vine maple, hazel, snowberry, and oceanspray. The region covers 812 square miles (2,100 km^{2}) in Washington and 162 sq mi (420 km^{2}) in Oregon, on the eastern slopes of Mount Rainier, Mount Adams, and Mount Hood, and on Black Butte. It contains land belonging to the Yakama Nation and public land within the Wenatchee, Gifford Pinchot, Deschutes, and Mount Hood National Forests (including the Badger Creek Wilderness).

=== Oak/Conifer Foothills (9c) ===
The Oak/Conifer Foothills ecoregion is lower and drier than the Grand Fir Mixed Forest and more diverse than other parts of the Eastern Cascades. It consists of foothills, low mountains, plateaus, and valleys from 500 to 3,500 ft (150 to 1,070 m). Marine weather enters the region via the Columbia River Gorge, moderating the otherwise continental climate. As a result, soil, climate, and vegetation share characteristics of both eastern and western Oregon. The region is characterized by Oregon white oak woodlands and ponderosa pine forests in the east and Douglas-fir and western hemlock forests in the west. Some grasslands also occur. Understory plants include Idaho fescue, bluebunch wheatgrass, antelope bitterbrush, Oregon grape, hazel, and snowberry. Common land uses include forestry, recreation, grazing, rural residential development, orchards, and, in the valleys, grain and hay farming. The land is mostly privately owned. The region covers 563 sq mi (1,460 km^{2}) in Washington and 461 sq mi (1,190 km^{2}) in Oregon along the Columbia River corridor, including the lower reaches of the White Salmon and Klickitat River drainages.

=== Ponderosa Pine/Bitterbrush Woodland (9d) ===
The Ponderosa Pine/Bitterbrush Woodland ecoregion has a terrain dominated by high, undulating volcanic plateaus and canyons, with permanent, medium gradient streams. Elevation varies from 2,400 to 5,200 ft (730 to 1,580 m). Stream flow is consistent year-round, due to the volcanic hydrogeology. The well-drained, frigid soils are derived from Mazama Ash, which was produced by the catastrophic eruption of Mount Mazama about 6,845 years ago, and support nearly homogenous stands of ponderosa pine. Historically, frequent fires burned undergrowth, creating open groves of pines. Lodgepole pine is largely absent here. Understory vegetation varies with elevation; at lower elevations, antelope bitterbrush is important winter browse for deer. At higher elevations, greenleaf manzanita and snowberry are found. Riparian areas support mountain alder, stream dogwood, willows, and sedges. The region covers 1,077 sq mi (2,790 km^{2}) in Oregon, east of Mount Jefferson, Three Fingered Jack, and the Three Sisters, in the Deschutes National Forest and on the Warm Springs Indian Reservation.

=== Pumice Plateau (9e) ===
The Pumice Plateau ecoregion is a high volcanic plateau, characteristically covered by thick deposits of Mount Mazama ash and pumice. Elevation varies from 4,200 to 8,300 ft (1,300 to 2,500 m). Residual soils are very deep, highly permeable, and subject to drought, with intermittent, low to medium gradient streams and spring-fed creeks and marshes. Freezing temperatures are possible any time of year. Ponderosa pine forests are common on slopes, with white fir at higher elevations. Colder depressions and flats, where pumice deposits are thickest, are dominated by lodgepole pine, with an understory of antelope bitterbrush and Idaho fescue. Riparian areas support mountain alder, stream dogwood, willows, and quaking aspen. The Pumice Plateau is the largest of the Eastern Cascades subregions, covering 4,236 sq mi (10,970 km^{2}) in Oregon between Bend and Klamath Falls. It contains extensive areas within the Deschutes and Fremont-Winema National Forests (including the Gearhart Mountain Wilderness) and the lower elevations of the Newberry National Volcanic Monument.

=== Cold Wet Pumice Plateau Basins (9f) ===
The Cold Wet Pumice Plateau Basins ecoregion includes Sycan Marsh, Klamath Marsh, and La Pine Basin, which are surrounded by the Pumice Plateau but have distinct vegetation and topography. At an elevation of 4,100 to 5,200 ft (1,200 to 1,600 m), they function as cold air catch-basins during the winter, which results in lower minimum temperatures. Soils in the basins have water tables at or near the surface for significant periods of the year, in contrast to the soils of the Pumice Plateau. The La Pine Basin is underlain by thick lacustrine deposits that exhibit high groundwater levels during the spring snowmelt. It supports lodgepole pine stands, as well as wet, forested wetlands of lodgepole pine, willow, and aspen. Scattered ponderosa pine shrub forest is found on the driest soils. The Sycan and Klamath marshes support wetland meadow vegetation, including tules and tufted hairgrass. Marshes, lakes, reservoirs, wetland forests, and medium and low gradient rivers provide important habitat for migratory waterfowl. The region covers 651 sq mi (1,690 km^{2}) in Oregon, a mixture of private and public lands, including the Deschutes and Fremont-Winema National Forests and the Klamath Marsh National Wildlife Refuge.

=== Klamath/Goose Lake Warm Wet Basins (9g) ===
The Klamath/Goose Lake Warm Wet Basins ecoregion (named for Upper Klamath and Goose lakes) is drier than elsewhere in the eastern Cascades, yet it contains floodplains, terraces, and a pluvial lake basin. Elevation varies from 4,000 to 5,400 ft (1,200 to 1,600 m). A variety of wildrye, bluegrass, and wheatgrass species once covered the basins, but most of the wet meadows and wetlands have been drained for rural residential development, pasture, and cropland, including alfalfa, potatoes, and small grains. Potential vegetation includes bluebunch wheatgrass, Idaho fescue, antelope bitterbrush, big sagebrush, and low sagebrush on the steppes, with tules, cattails, and sedges in the wetlands. Several marshland wildlife refuges within the Klamath Basin National Wildlife Refuges Complex are key to preserving regional biodiversity, particularly at-risk bird and fish species. The region covers 1,039 sq mi (2,690 km^{2}) in Klamath and Lake counties, Oregon. Contiguous areas in California have not been mapped yet.

=== Fremont Pine/Fir Forest (9h) ===
The Fremont Pine/Fir Forest ecoregion contains steeply to moderately sloping mountains and high plateaus that rarely exceed timberline. Elevation varies from 5,000 to 8,000 ft (1,500 to 2,400 m). Residual soils are common in the region, in contrast to the Pumice Plateau, where soils have been deeply buried by pumice and ash. Reservoirs, a few glacial rock-basin lakes, many springs, and high gradient intermittent and ephemeral streams occur. The continental climate and diverse terrain support a range of vegetation types. Ponderosa pine and western juniper woodlands are common at lower elevations. White fir, sugar pine, whitebark pine, lodgepole pine, and California incense-cedar are found on north slopes and at higher elevations. Understory plants include snowberry, heartleaf arnica, Wheeler bluegrass, antelope bitterbrush, and longstolon sedge. The region covers 1,672 sq mi (4,330 km^{2}) in Oregon, mainly on public land within the Fremont-Winema National Forest. Contiguous areas in California have not been mapped yet.

=== Southern Cascades Slope (9i) ===
The Southern Cascades Slope ecoregion is a transitional zone between the Cascades ecoregion and the drier Eastern Cascade Slopes and Foothills, characterized by moderately sloping mountains with medium to high gradient streams. Elevation varies from 3,600 to 6,300 ft (1,100 to 1,900 m). It is higher than other subregions in the Eastern Cascades and typically receives greater precipitation. Forests of ponderosa pine blanket the mountainous landscape; white fir, Shasta red fir, Douglas-fir, and incense cedar grow at higher elevations. Understory plants include Idaho fescue, antelope bitterbrush, Ross' sedge, western fescue, snowberry, and golden chinkapin. The region covers 515 sq mi (1,330 km^{2}) in Oregon, south of Aspen Butte in the Klamath River watershed, including Bear Valley National Wildlife Refuge. Contiguous areas in California have not been mapped yet.

=== Klamath Juniper Woodland (9j) ===
The Klamath Juniper Woodland ecoregion is composed of undulating hills, benches, and escarpments covered with a mosaic of rangeland and woodland, at an elevation of 4,400 to 6,200 ft (1,300 to 1,900 m). Mean annual precipitation ranges from 12 to 20 in (30 to 51 cm) per year. Western juniper grows on shallow, rocky soils with an understory of low sagebrush, Wyoming big sagebrush, bitterbrush, and bunchgrasses. Several species found in the shrub-steppe grasslands are uncommon in eastern Oregon, such as woolly wyethia, Klamath plum, and birchleaf mountain-mahogany. The diverse shrublands provide important wildlife habitat. Reservoirs dot the landscape and are important to lowland irrigation. The region covers 784 sq mi (2,030 km^{2}) in Oregon, south of Klamath Falls in the Lost River watershed, a mixture of public and private land. Contiguous areas in California have not been mapped yet.

== Gallery ==
=== Flora ===
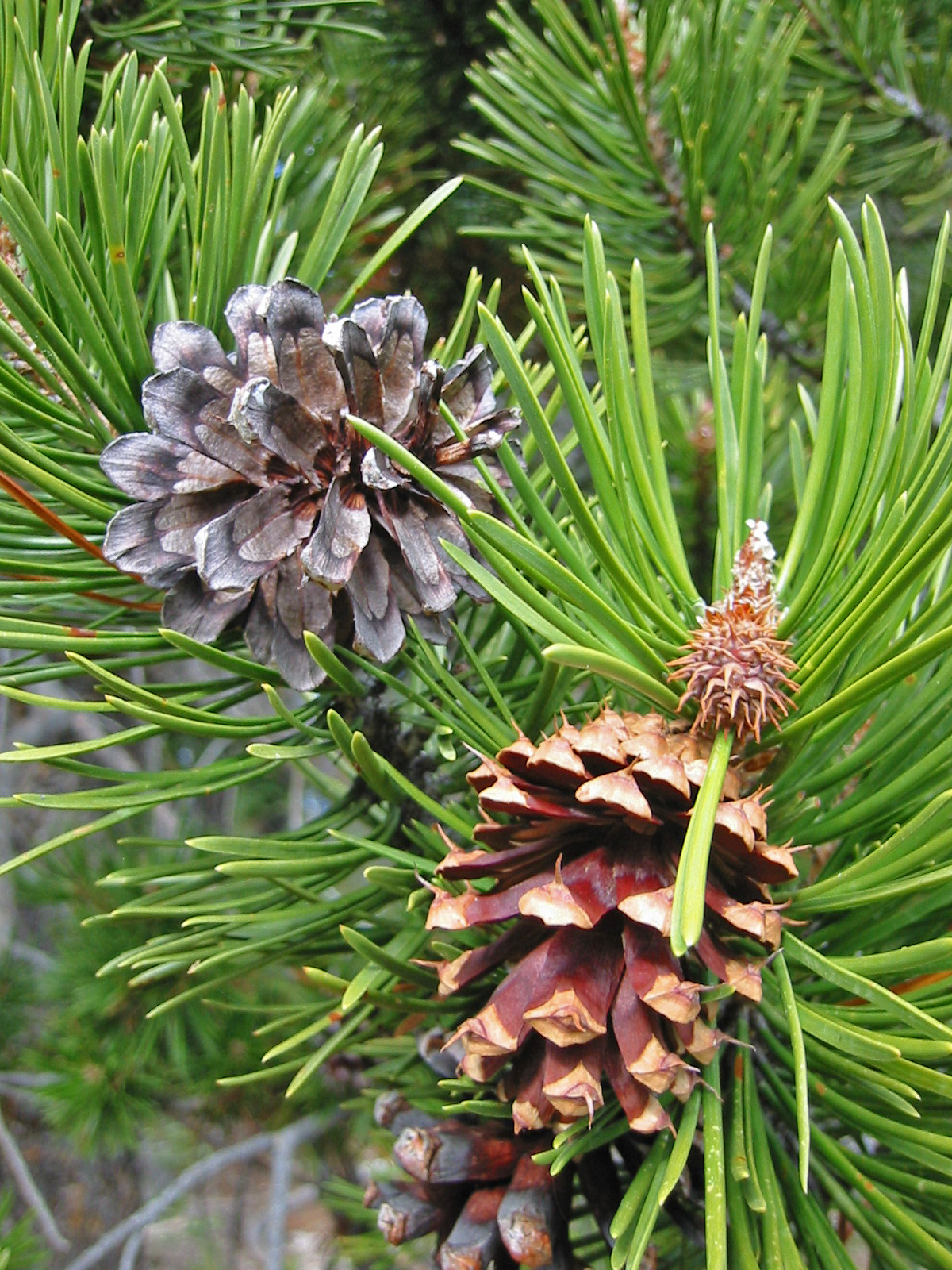
Tamarack pine

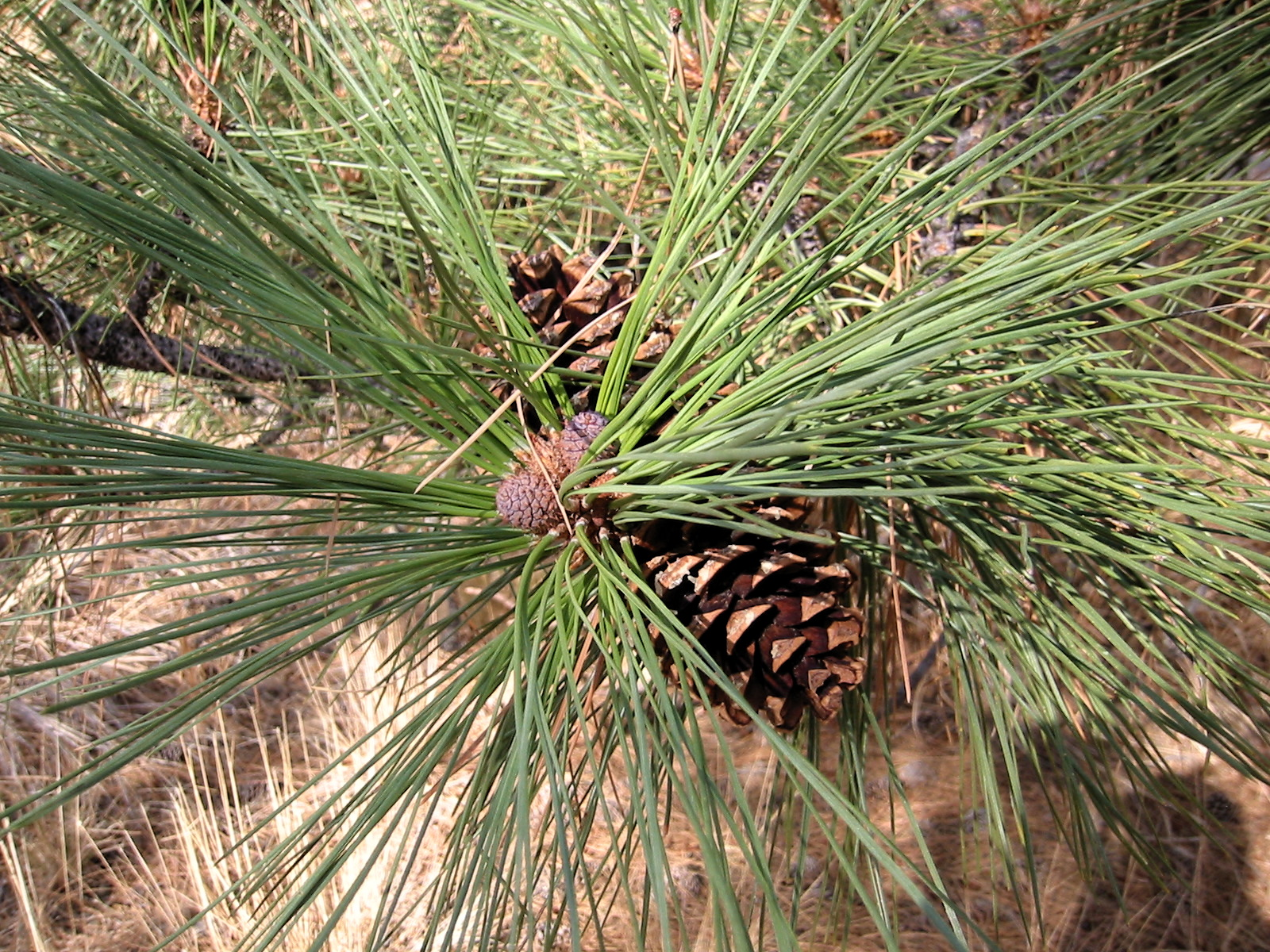
Ponderosa pine in the Klamath Marsh NWR

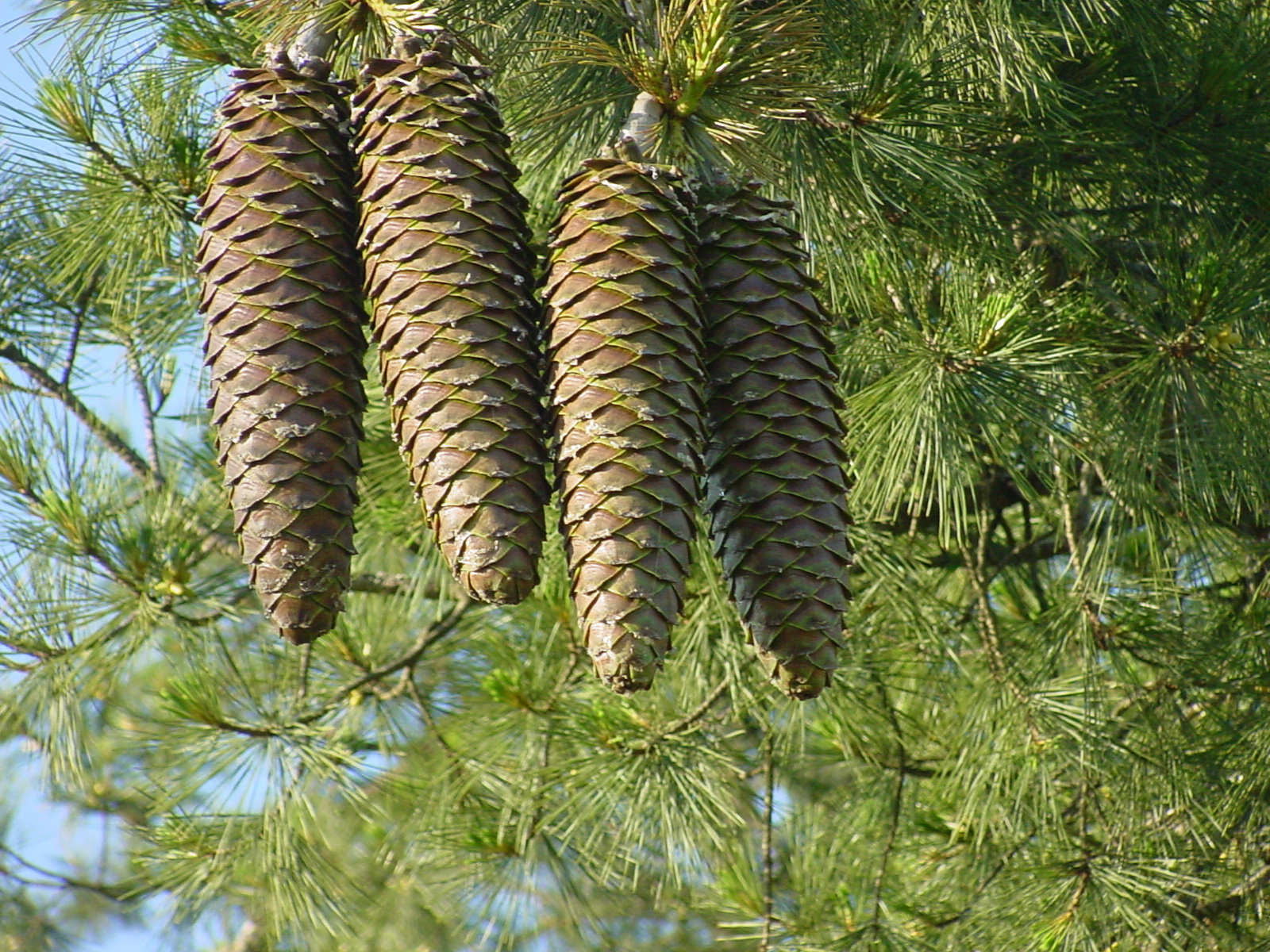
Sugar pine

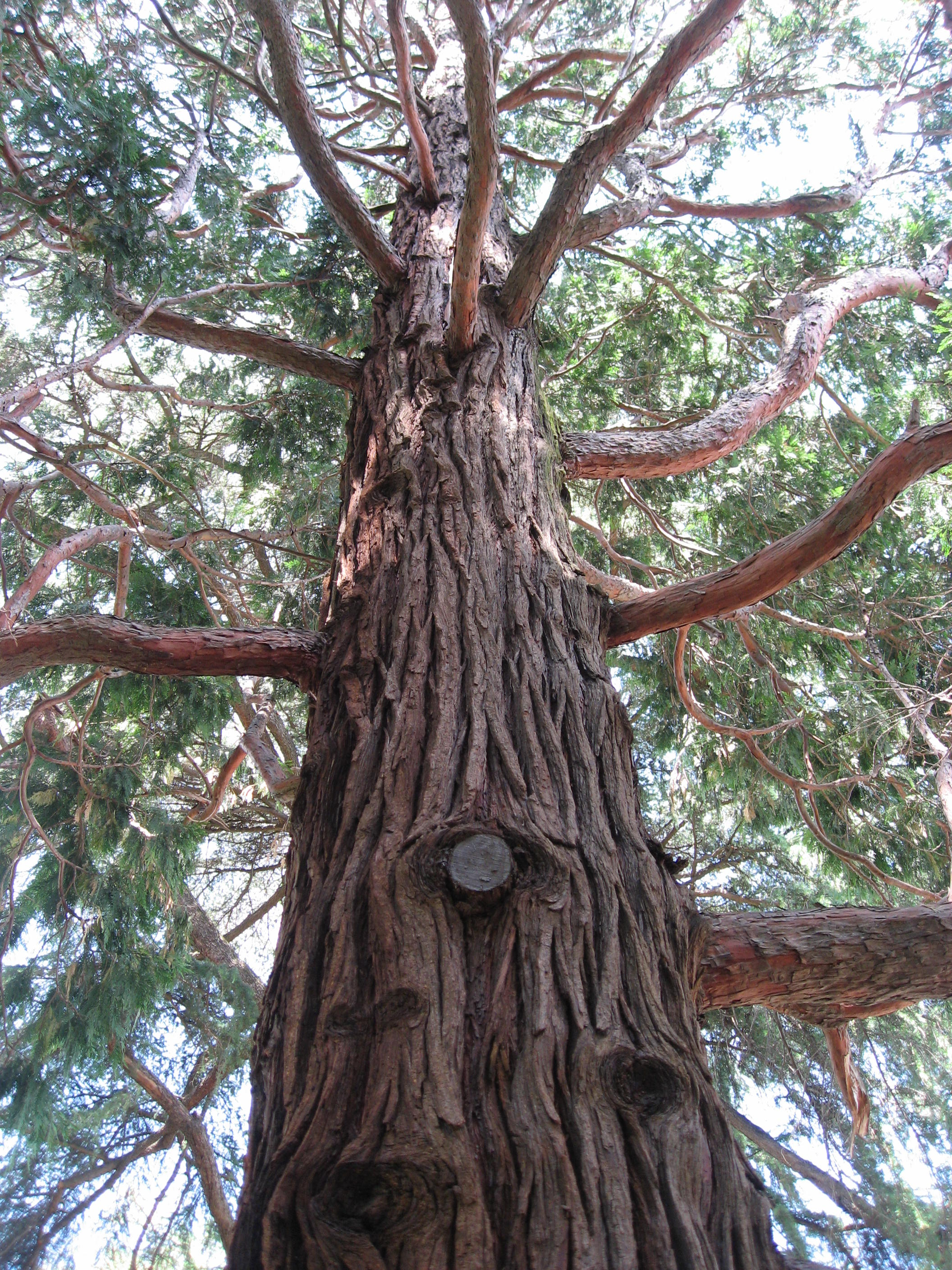
California incense-cedar

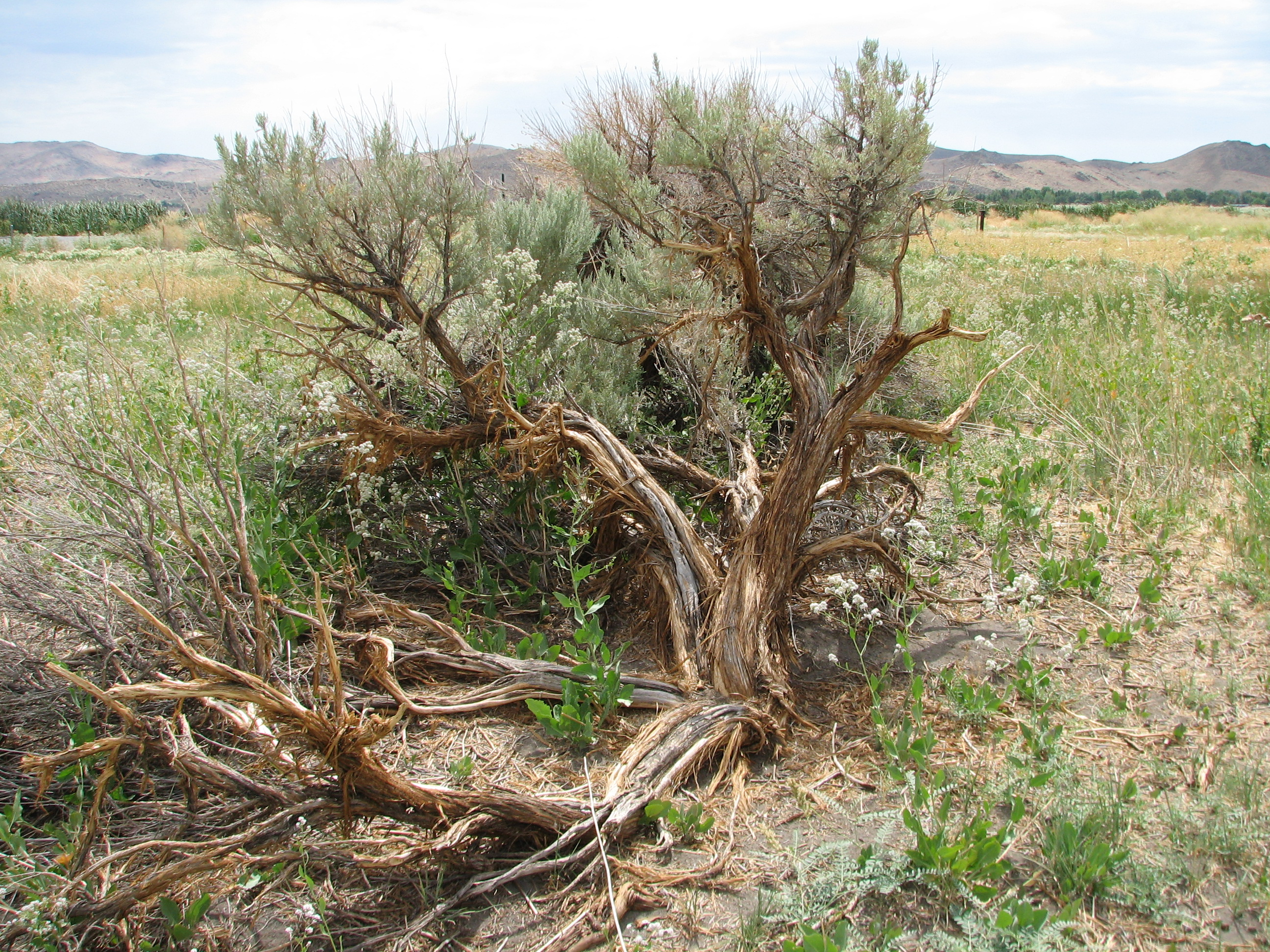
Big sagebrush

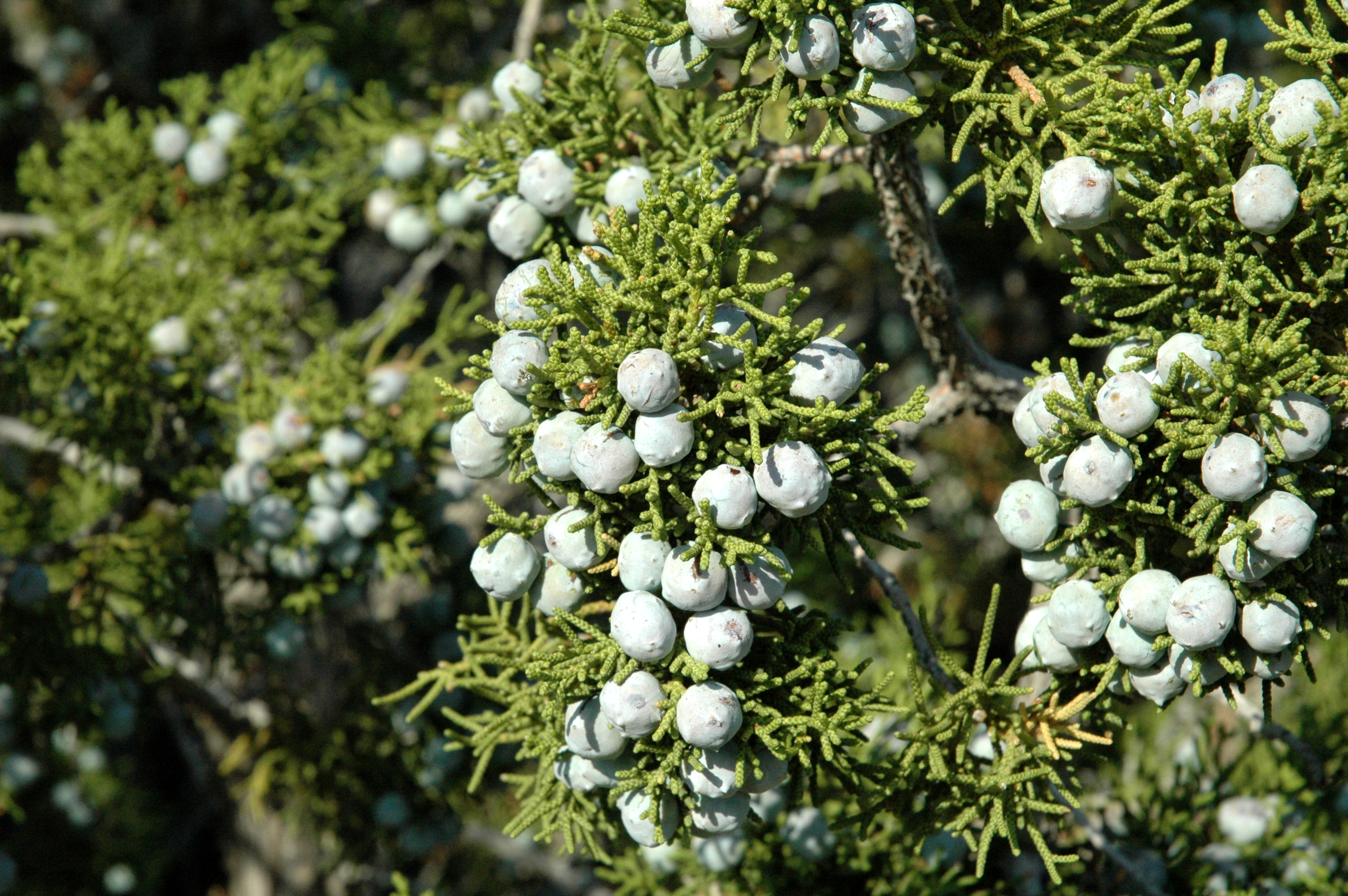
Western juniper berries

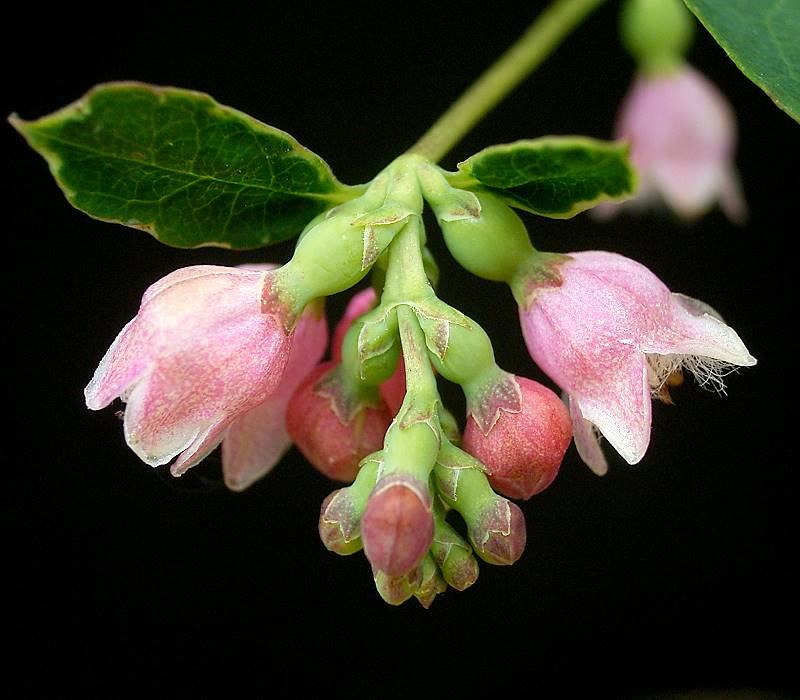
Common snowberry

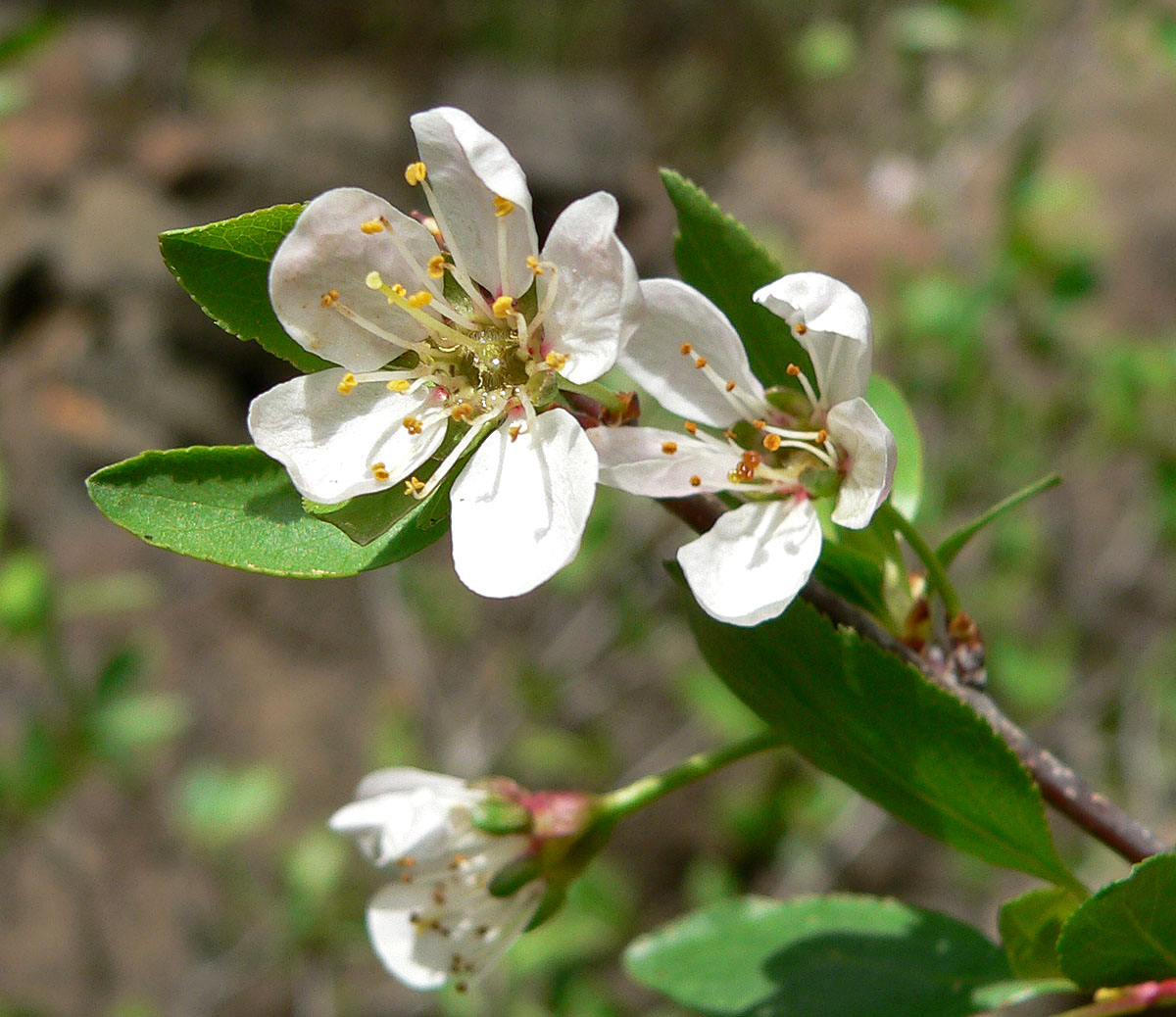
Klamath plum

=== Fauna ===
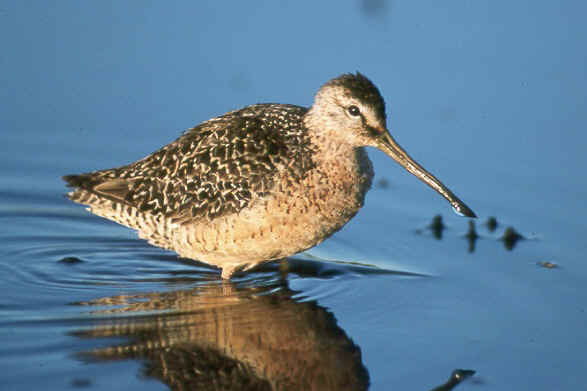
Long-billed dowitcher in the Klamath Basin NWR

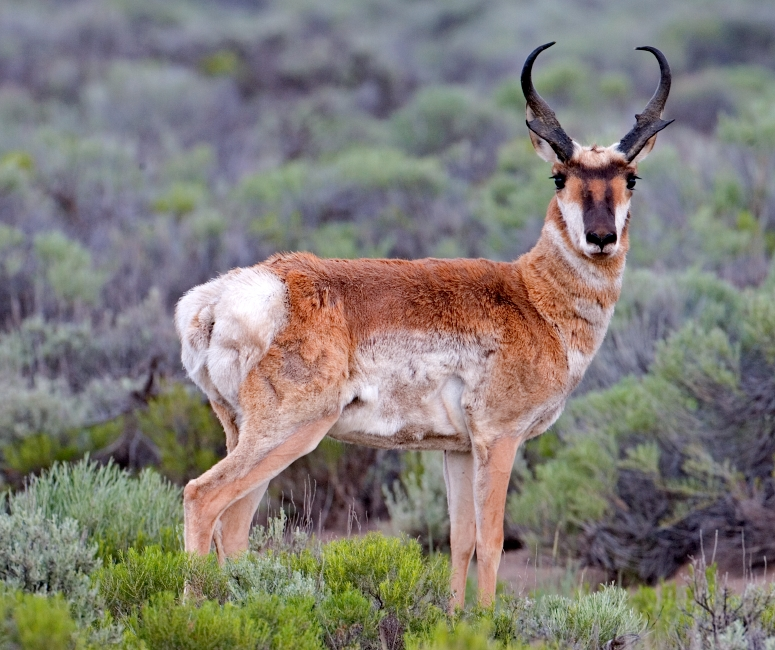
Pronghorn on the Pumice Plateau

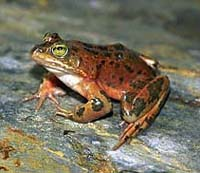
Oregon spotted frog, an endangered species candidate

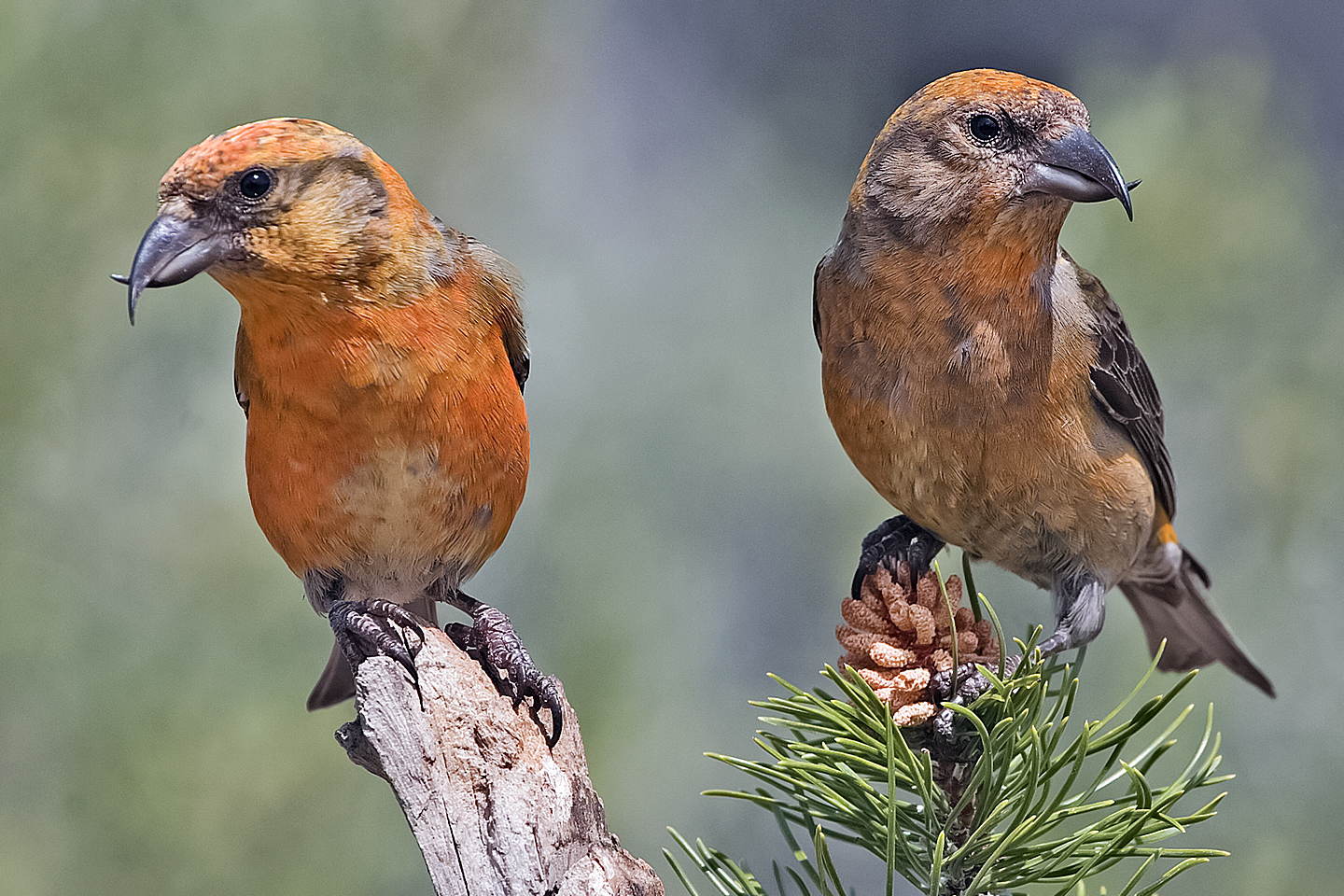
Red crossbills in Deschutes National Forest

=== Landscapes ===
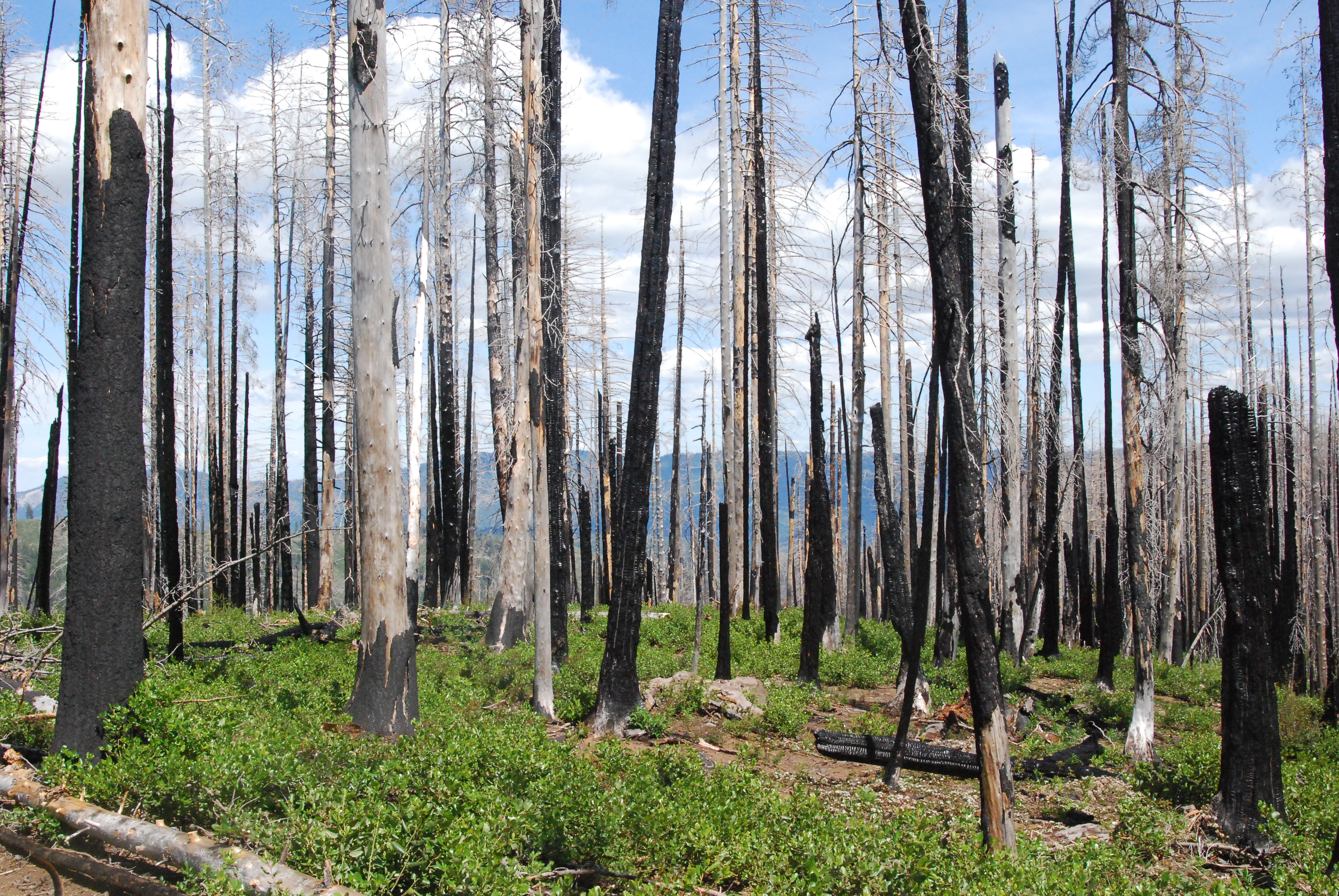
Lodgepole pine after wildfire, Deschutes National Forest

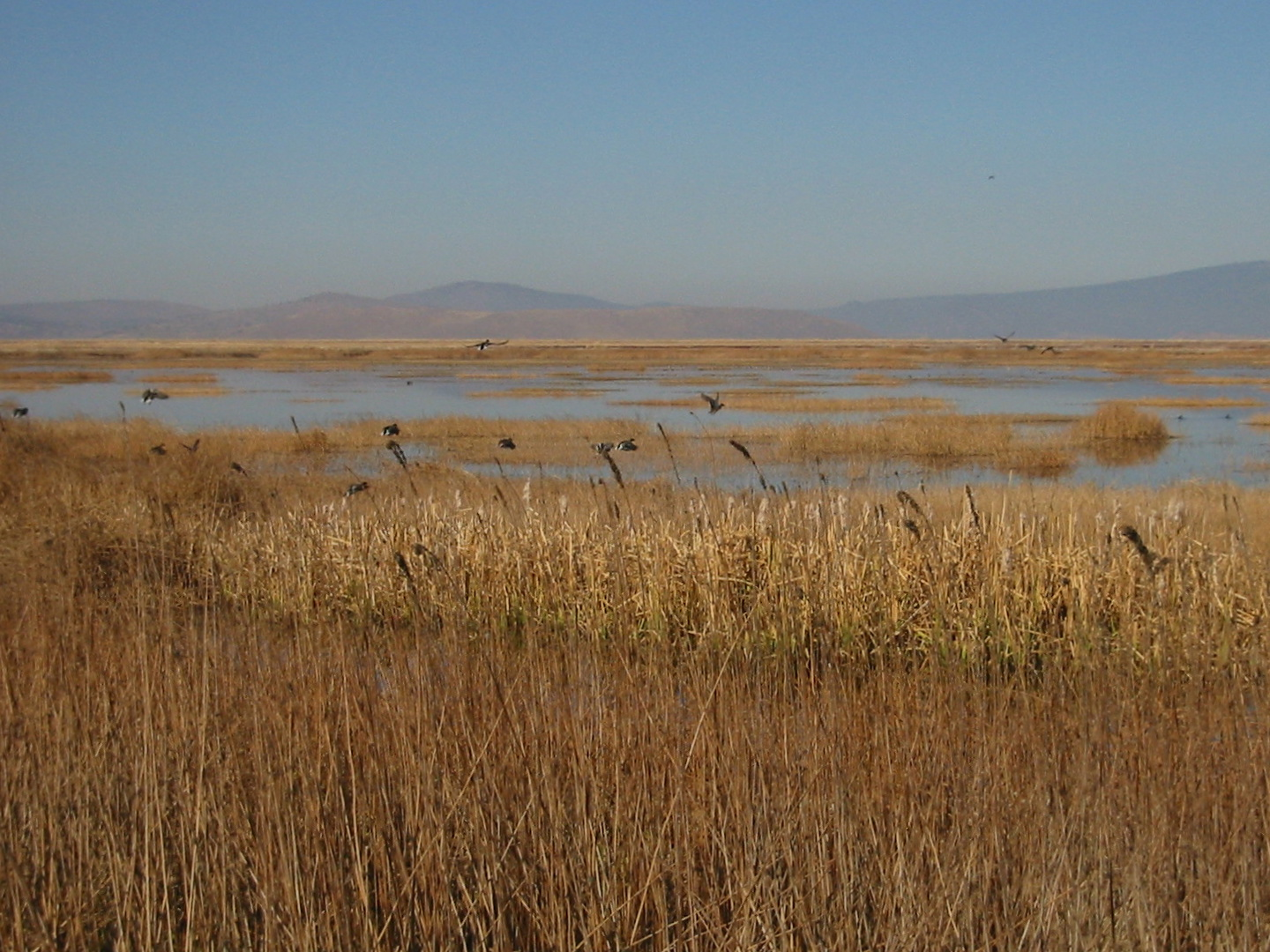
Freshwater marsh in the Lower Klamath NWR

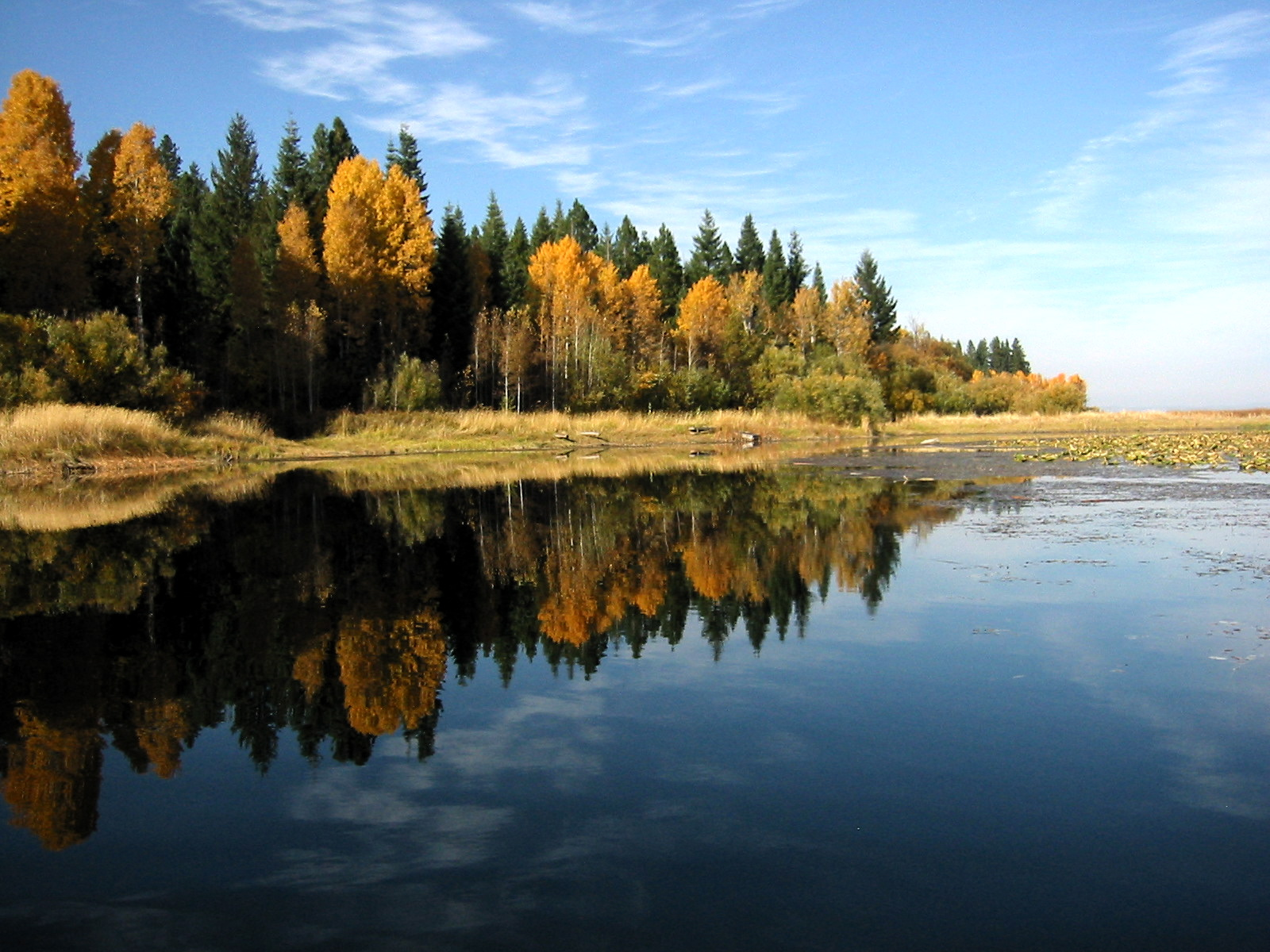
Canoe trail in the Upper Klamath NWR

== See also ==
- Ecoregions defined by the EPA and the Commission for Environmental Cooperation:
  - List of ecoregions in North America (CEC)
  - List of ecoregions in the United States (EPA)
  - List of ecoregions in Oregon
  - List of ecoregions in California
- The conservation group World Wildlife Fund maintains an alternate classification system:
  - List of ecoregions (WWF)
  - List of ecoregions in the United States (WWF)
