= Pacific Flyway =

Major north-south flyway for migratory birds in the Americas

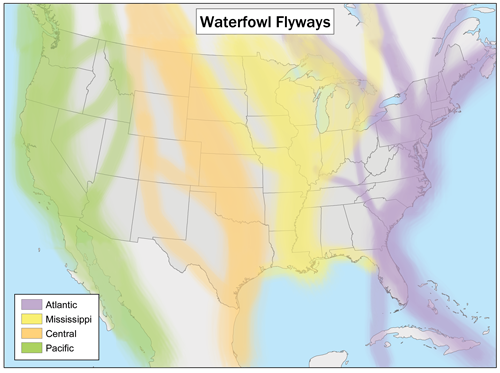
Waterfowl flyways in the United States. The Pacific Flyway is in green.

The Pacific Flyway is a major north–south flyway for migratory birds in the Americas, extending from Alaska to Patagonia. Every year, migratory birds travel some or all of this distance both in spring and in fall, following food sources, heading to breeding grounds, or travelling to overwintering sites.

Any given bird species travels roughly the same route every year, at almost the same time. Ornithologists and birdwatchers can often predict to the day when a particular species will show up in their area.

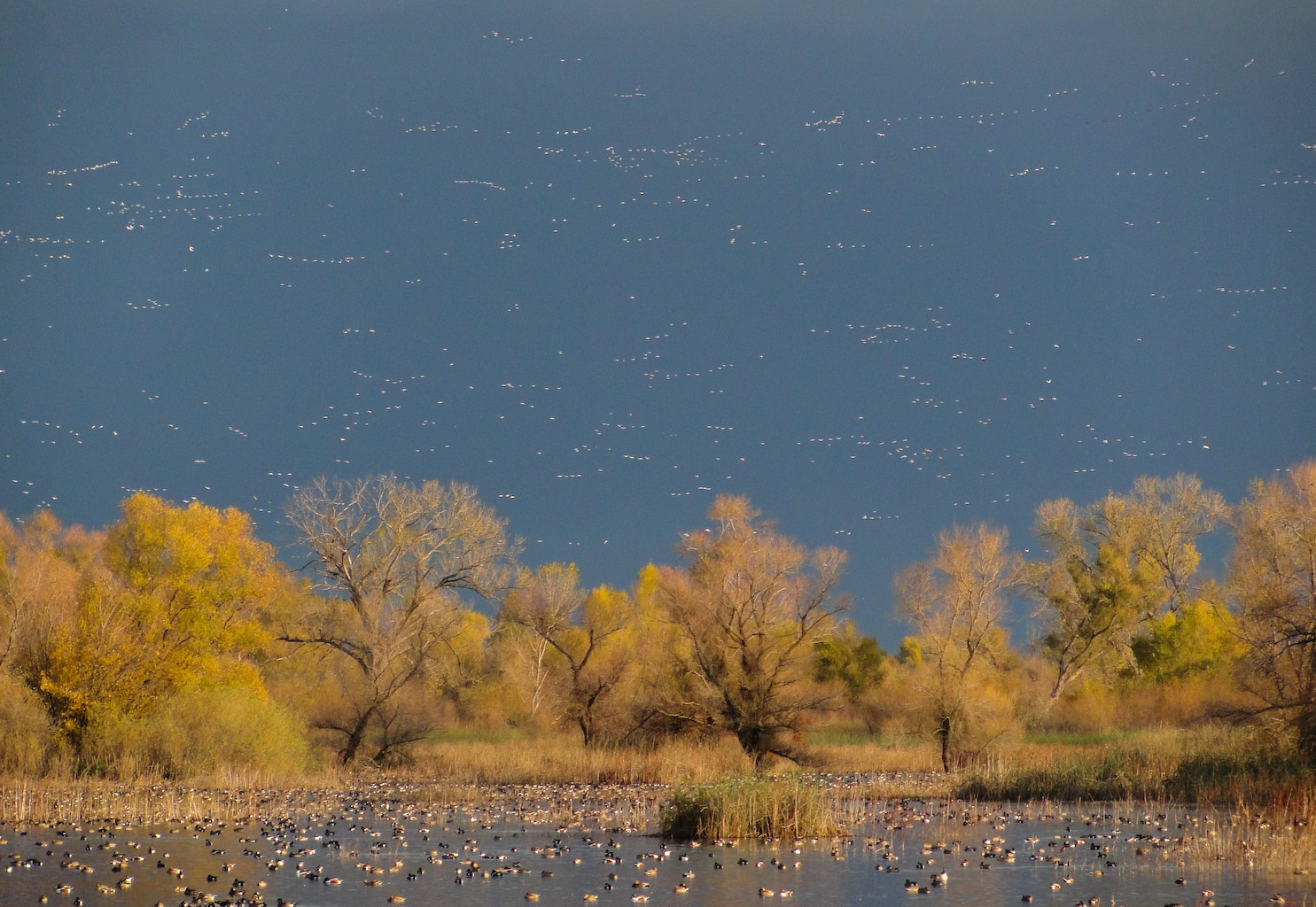
Waterfowl arriving in California's Central Valley in the fall

== Notable locations ==
Along the Pacific Flyway, there are many key rest stops where birds of many species gather, sometimes in the millions, to feed and regain their strength before continuing. Some species may remain in these rest stops for the entire season, but most stay a few days before moving on.

- Boundary Bay, British Columbia, has been listed as an Important Bird Area by the Canadian government in recognition of its value to migratory birds.
- Grays Harbor National Wildlife Refuge, in southwest Washington, is a major staging area for shorebirds.
- Malheur National Wildlife Refuge, in Harney County, southeastern Oregon.
- Alaksen National Wildlife Area, on Westham Island off Richmond, British Columbia.
- Vic Fazio Yolo Wildlife Area in the Yolo Bypass in the Central Valley of California.
- Klamath Basin National Wildlife Refuges Complex consists of several different wildlife refuges on the border of Oregon and California.
- The Summer Lake Wildlife Area, located on northwestern edge of the Great Basin drainage in south-central Oregon.
- Sacramento National Wildlife Refuge Complex consists of several wildlife refuges in the northern Central Valley of California.
- San Luis National Wildlife Refuge Complex consists of several wildlife refuges in the San Joaquin Valley of California.
- Suisun Marsh, next to the exit of the inverted Sacramento–San Joaquin River Delta, has protected portions.
- San Francisco Bay, protected estuaries and mountain open space preserves.
- Coyote Valley, southern Santa Clara Valley, in Northern California.
- Great Salt Lake, Utah, a Great Basin hub of the flyway.
- Henderson Bird Viewing Preserve, Nevada.
- Monterey Bay, protected estuaries and mountain open space preserves.
- Ballona Wetlands between the Los Angeles neighborhoods of Playa del Rey and Marina del Rey, and the adjacent city-owned lagoons.
- Seal Beach National Wildlife Refuge, a coastal salt marsh located within Naval Weapons Station Seal Beach in Orange County, California.
- Bolsa Chica Ecological Reserve, a coastal wetlands located in Huntington Beach, California.
- Upper Newport Bay Nature Preserve and Ecological Reserve in Newport Beach, Southern California.
- Salton Sea, an inland Colorado Desert saline endorheic lake in Southern California, hosts many birds and has surrounding wildlife refuges
- San Diego Bay, which includes several areas designated as part of the San Diego National Wildlife Refuge Complex
- Ciénega de Santa Clara, in Sonora, Mexico, in the Colorado River Delta, a major overwintering stop for hundreds of thousands of birds.
- Guerrero Negro Baja California Sur bird sanctuary half way of the peninsula of Baja California Mexico.
- San Jose Estuary San Jose del Cabo Baja California Sur, Mexico bird sanctuary and birding Los Cabos.
- Palo Verde National Park, Guanacaste province, Costa Rica. The estuary in this park is located at the mouth of the Tempisque River, the second largest basin in the country. Major migratory visits: March to May, at the start of the rainy season.

== See also ==
- List of Klamath Basin birds
- Important Bird Area
- Category: Ornithology in the United States
- Category: National Wildlife Refuges of the United States
