= Ciénega de Santa Clara =

Wetland in Sonora, Mexico

- Interactive map of Ciénega de Santa Clara
- Location: Sonora, Mexico
- Coordinates: 32°04′01″N 114°54′26″W
- Type: Wetland
- Primary inflows: Colorado River
- Basin countries: Mexico
- Surface area: 18,000 hectares (44,000 acres)

The Ciénega de Santa Clara is a 18,000 ha (44,000 acres) wetland in the Colorado River Delta, located in the state of Sonora, Mexico, about 50 km (31 mi) from the United States border. The wetland was accidentally created in the 1970s when, in an effort to reduce excessively saline water being released to Mexico as part of the Colorado River Compact, the US diverted agricultural runoff to a formerly desiccated area of the Sonoran desert. The area is today a wildlife refuge and provides wintering grounds for hundreds of thousands of migratory waterbirds. Because of upstream water use, the Colorado River no longer flows to the ocean, and the Ciénega de Santa Clara is one of the last remaining wetlands in the Colorado River Delta.

In 1993 the area was designated as a Biosphere Reserve by the United Nations Educational, Scientific, and Cultural Organization (UNESCO), and in 1997, it was designated a Wetland of International Importance by the Ramsar Convention.

Ciénega translates to "marsh" in English, but is also an ecological term for a stable wet meadow or marsh in an otherwise arid region, essentially an oasis in a desert. The term is typically used for areas in the American Southwest and Northern Mexico.

Location of Ciénega de Santa Clara (yellow "C") on map of lower Colorado River.

== Creation ==
The Colorado River originates in the Rocky Mountains in the United States and flows southward into Mexico, before its terminus at the Gulf of California. Prior to the creation of the Hoover Dam in the 1930s, and other major diversions and dams in the 1940s to 1960s, the majority of the Colorado River Delta at the Gulf of California was lushly vegetated.

Covering an area of two million acres, the delta contained an estimated 200 to 400 plant species and a habitat for a wide variety of fish, bird, and mammal wildlife, as well as marine crustaceans. However, since the creation of upstream dams and diversions, and despite regulation by the Colorado River Compact, the river flow to Mexico was greatly reduced, and for decades no water has reached the ocean. Over time the Colorado River Delta became essentially a desert. In 1973 the vegetated wetland area of the Ciénega was only about 200 ha (490 acres).

Since 1944, when a cooperative agreement with Mexico was signed, the United States has agreed to deliver a defined volume of Colorado River water to Mexico, 1.5 million acre-feet per year. This volume represents about 9% of the total flow of the river (16.5 million acre-feet) as established under the Colorado River Compact, most water being diverted to uses in the United States. By the early 1970s the water delivered to Mexico included considerable brackish runoff from agricultural lands in southern Arizona. In an attempt to reduce the salinity of water being delivered to the river, the US worked with Mexico to build a 50 mi (80 km)-long canal, completed in 1977, called the Main Outlet Drain Extension (“MODE”). This canal diverted roughly 100,000 acre-feet of agricultural runoff water per year from the US to what was then a desiccated area in the Sonoran Desert in Mexico. Unexpectedly, this salty runoff created an oasis that is today the Ciénega de Santa Clara. Today it is the last remaining wetland of any size in the Colorado River Delta.

External image
- Canal and desalting plant locations
- The Colorado River Delta. Map: Allison Hammond, Audubon,

The MODE canal was intended as a temporary measure until a desalting plant could be built in Yuma, Arizona. The Yuma Desalting Plant was constructed at a cost of $250 million dollars and completed in 1992. However, various issues with the plant, including damages from a 1993 flood and funding problems, have left it largely unused since its construction.

As of 2026, the MODE canal continues to feed water to the Ciénega de Santa Clara. The canal is the primary reason for the wetlands' existence. In 1993, flow from the canal was interrupted for repairs for about eight months, and in that time 60-70% of the wetlands habitat died back. Encouragingly, the area was able to recover when water flow resumed.

== Description ==
The Ciénega de Santa Clara is located in the state of Sonora, about 45 km (28 mi) south of the city of San Luis Río Colorado, which is on the border with Arizona. It is located in the northeastern corner of the Colorado River Delta. The Ciénega is a lentic ecosystem, that is, the aquatic environment has little or no surface flow. The extent of the area has been reported as covering varying sizes but it is most commonly described as encompassing approximately 18,000 hectares (44,000 acres). Carrillo-Guerrero et al.(2013) described it as being a 18,000 hectare wetland consisting of 6,500 hectares of cattail marsh and 11,500 hectares of open water lagoons and mudflats.

The primary vegetation species is the southern cattail (Typha domingensis). Other vegetation present are salt grass (Distichlis spicata), saltbush (Atriplex canescens), bulrush (Schoenoplectus americanus), and common reed (Phragmites australis), all species which are salt tolerant. The marsh vegetation stabilizes sediments, filters water, and offers cover for wildlife.

Open water areas in the Ciénega provide habitat for fish populations and resting and breeding grounds for waterfowl. The area is a refuge for a number of endangered animal species, including the Desert Pupfish (Cyprinodon macularius), the Yuma Clapper Rail (Rallus longirostris yumanensis), and the California Black Rail (Laterallus jamaicensis). The mudflats serve as feeding grounds for wading birds and shorebirds, providing rich invertebrate prey.

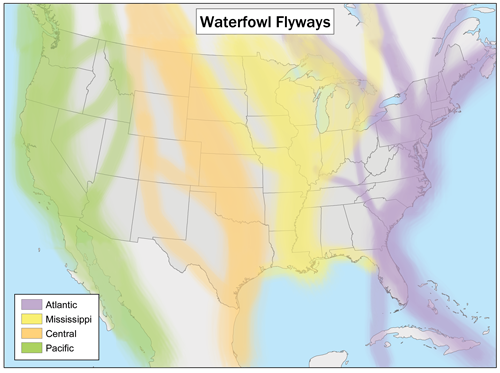
Waterfowl flyways in the United States. The Pacific Flyway is in green.

The Ciénega de Santa Clara is a major bird refuge, providing critical habitat, food, and shelter for hundreds of thousands of birds who migrate north and south along the Pacific Flyway. These include the Western Sandpiper, Snowy Plover, and American Avocet, as well as thousands of other shorebirds, pelicans, cormorants, ducks, and geese who are there year round. A 2013 study found that the Ciénega provided habitat for 261 species of birds, including 189 species that overwinter there. These represented 71% of all species known in the Colorado River Delta. Twenty-seven species of birds in the Ciénega are federally protected in Mexico.

The area is also a tourist destination, providing the opportunity for wildlife viewing, birding, walking, canoeing, kayaking, fishing, and camping. The best bird-watching period is recommended from October to April. Tourist guides note that the heat in the area can be extreme, temperatures reaching as high as 122 °F (50 °C). It is listed as being a 85 km (53 mi) drive from the city of San Luis Río Colorado.

== In literature ==
In 1922, one of the most well-known environmentalists in US history, Aldo Leopold, spent 10 days canoeing in the eastern part of the Colorado River Delta where the Ciénega is today, which at the time was part of the river channel. He was in awe of the delta's apparent "endless maze of green lagoons." “On the map, the Delta was bisected by the river, but in fact the river was nowhere and everywhere,” he wrote in his landmark book A Sand County Almanac in 1949. “A verdant wall of mesquite and willow separated the channel from the thorny desert beyond,” he continued. “At each bend we saw egrets standing in the pools ahead, each white statue mashed by its white reflection. Fleets of cormorants drove their black prows in quest of skittering mullets; avocets, willets, and yellow-legs dozed one-legged on the bars; mallards, widgeons, and teal sprang skyward in alarm," he wrote. A study by NASA in 2020 noted that, outside of the Ciénega de Santa Clara, the "green lagoons" no longer exist, as the river's course had shifted to the west, then later dried up completely.

Flora and fauna

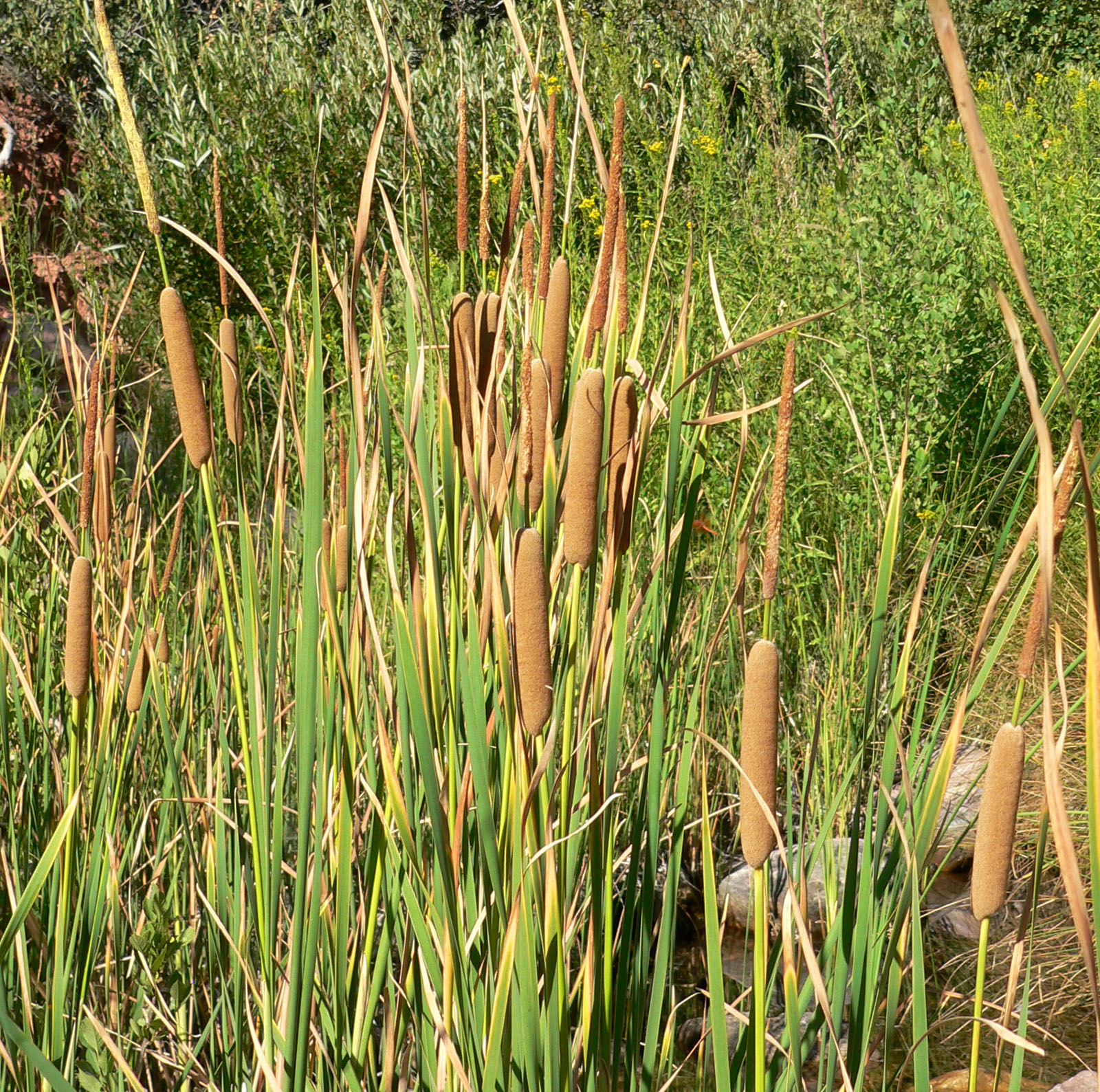
Southern cattail (Typha domingensis), the predominant vegetation in the wetland

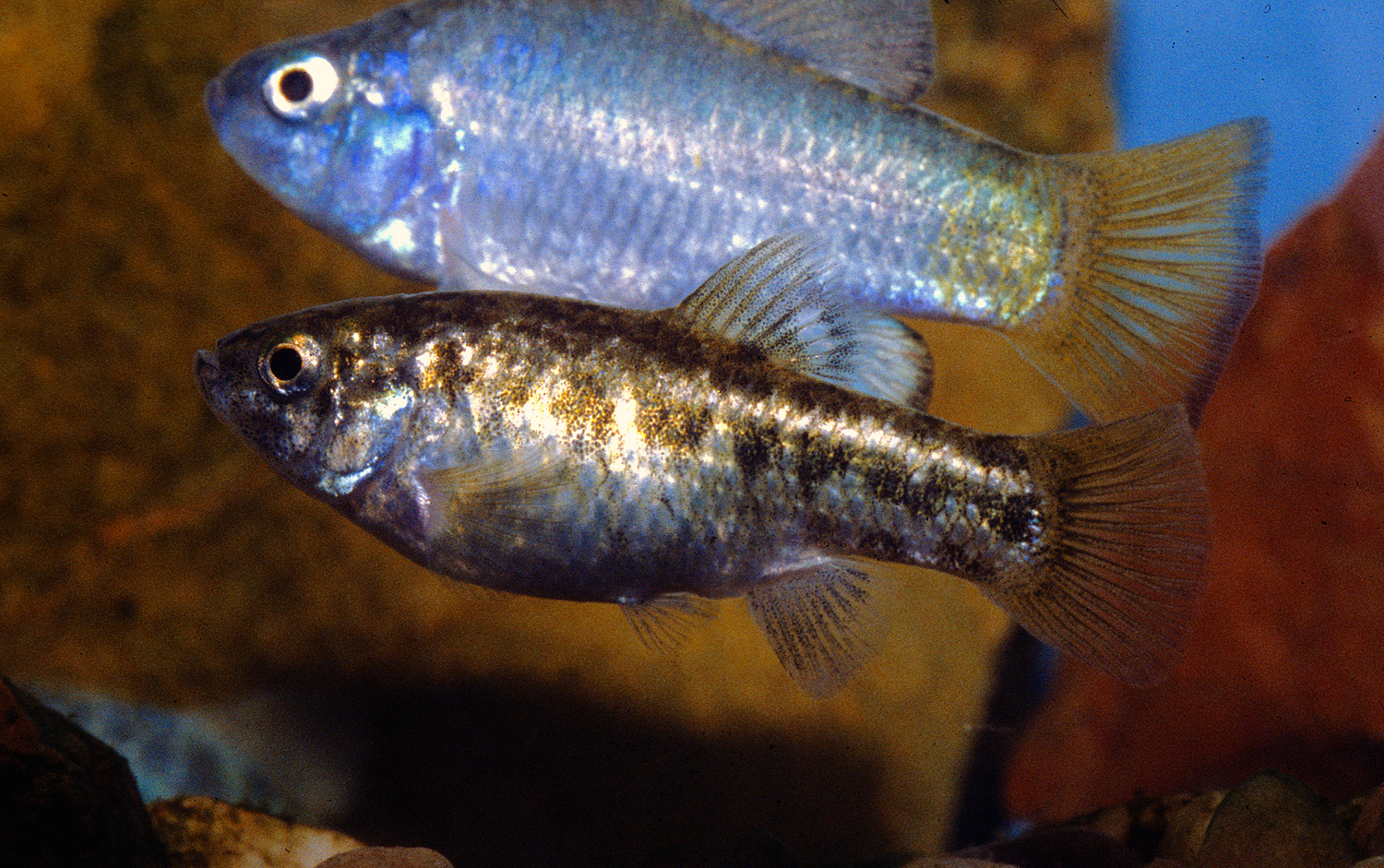
A pair of Desert pupfish (Cyprinodon macularius), an endangered fish species

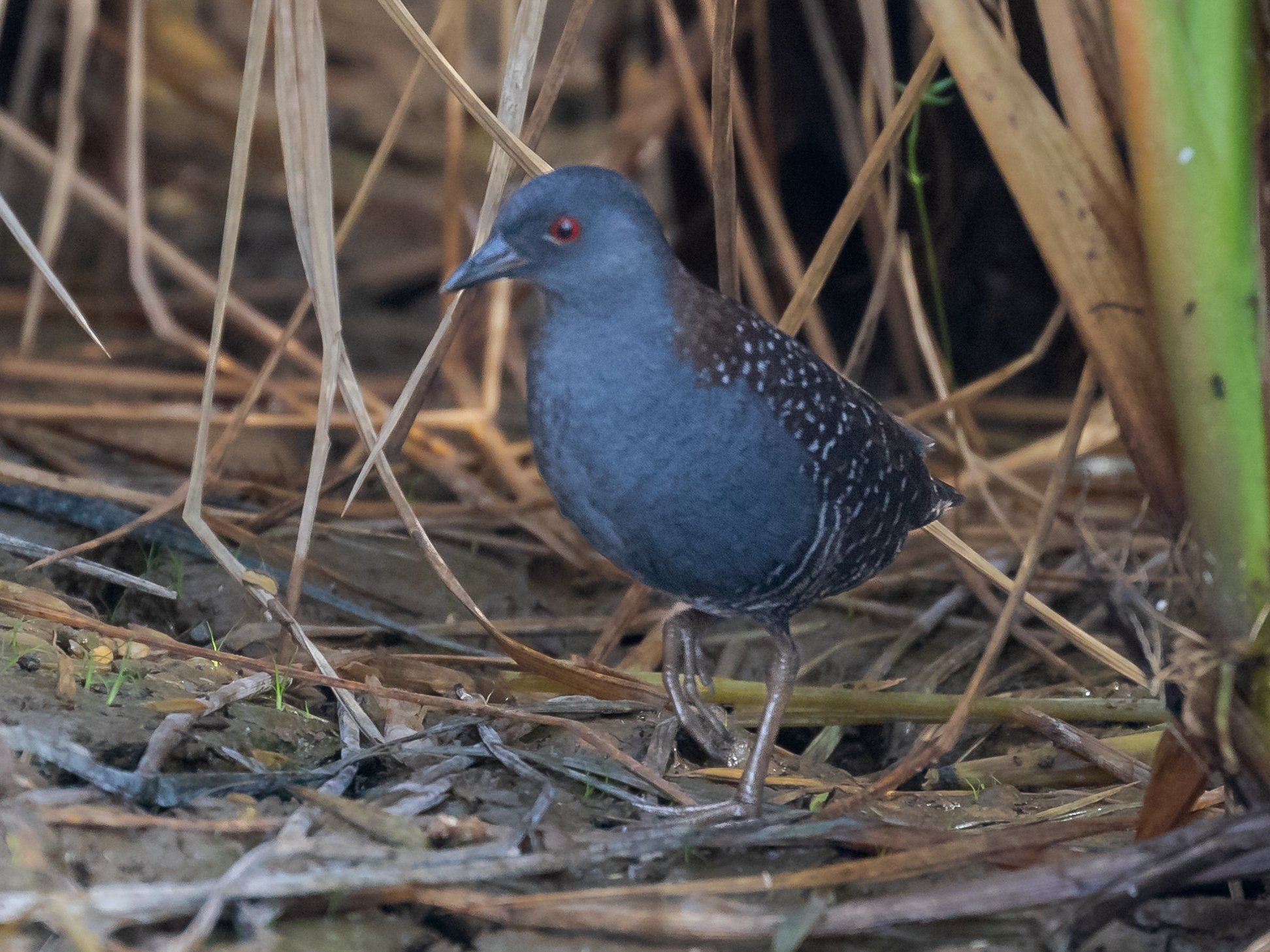
Black rail (Laterallus jamaicensis), an endangered bird species

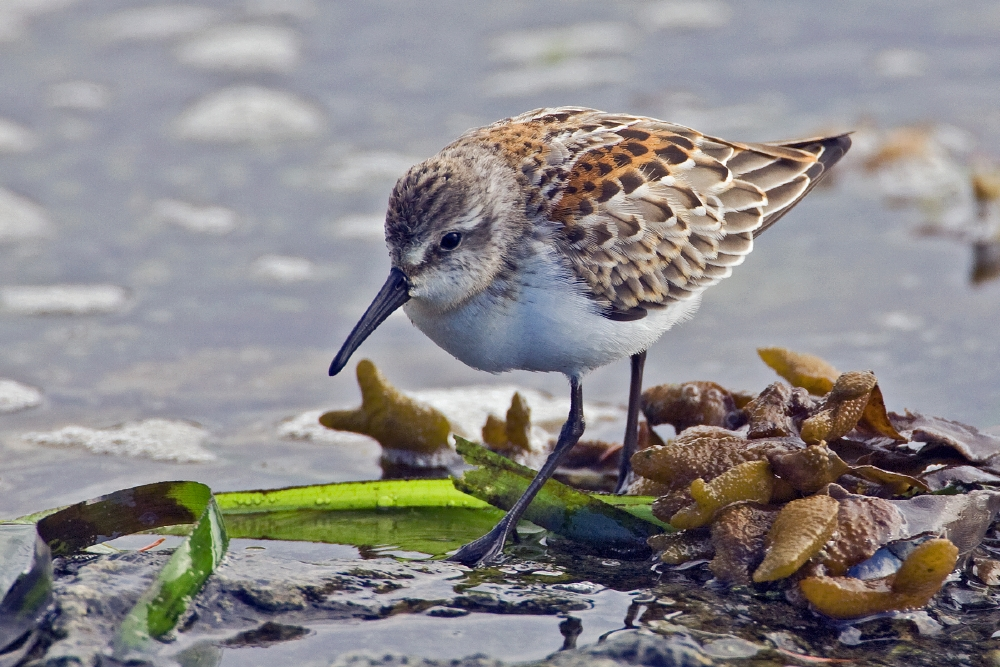
Western sandpiper (Calidris mauri), a migratory bird
