= Yuma Desalting Plant =

Saline agricultural return flow treatment plant

Yuma Desalination Plant
- Location within county
- Interactive map of Yuma Desalination Plant
- Location: Yuma, Arizona
- Coordinates: 32°43′39″N 114°42′25″W
- Estimated output: 50×10^{6} US gal (190,000 m^{3}) per day (190 megalitres)
- Technology: Reverse osmosis

The desalination plant in Yuma, Arizona, was constructed under authority of the state Colorado River Basin Salinity Control Act of 1974 to treat saline agricultural return flows from the Wellton-Mohawk Irrigation and Drainage District into the Colorado River. The treated water is intended for inclusion in water deliveries to Mexico, thereby keeping a like amount of freshwater in Lake Mead, Arizona and Nevada. Construction of the plant was completed in 1992, and it has operated on two occasions since then. With a full capacity of 73 million gallons per day of permeate water, it is the largest desalination plant in the US. The plant has been maintained, but largely not operated due to sufficient freshwater supplies from the upper Colorado River. An agreement was reached in April 2010 between the Southern Nevada Water Authority, the Metropolitan Water District of Southern California, the Central Arizona Project, and the U.S. Bureau of Reclamation to underwrite the cost of running the plant in a year-long pilot project.

== Creation of wetlands ==
Prior to the construction of dams along the Colorado River, the river fed one of the largest desert estuaries in the world. The vast Colorado River Delta once covered 1,930,000 acres and supported a large population of wildlife. During construction of the Yuma Desalting Plant, the United States set up the Main Outlet Drain Extension (MODE) canal to temporarily redirect the salty agricultural water from Arizona's Wellton-Mohawk Irrigation and Drainage District to a desert location in Sonora, Mexico. The temporary drainage eventually created an 12,000 acre "accidental wetland" called the Ciénega de Santa Clara. If the facility restarts operation, the water currently entering the wetlands will be desalinated and pumped into the Colorado River to eventually head to Mexico. Then the only water going to the wetland will be the byproduct of desalination, a "brine concentrate" consisting of one-third of the water flow and twice the amount of salt. This operation will cause the wetlands to disappear in its present form.
