= List of birds of the Klamath Basin =

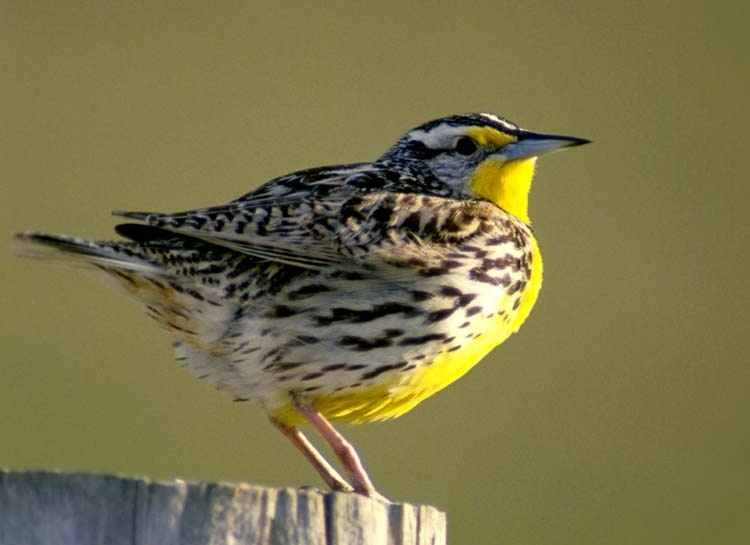
The western meadowlark (Sturnella neglecta) is the state bird of Oregon.

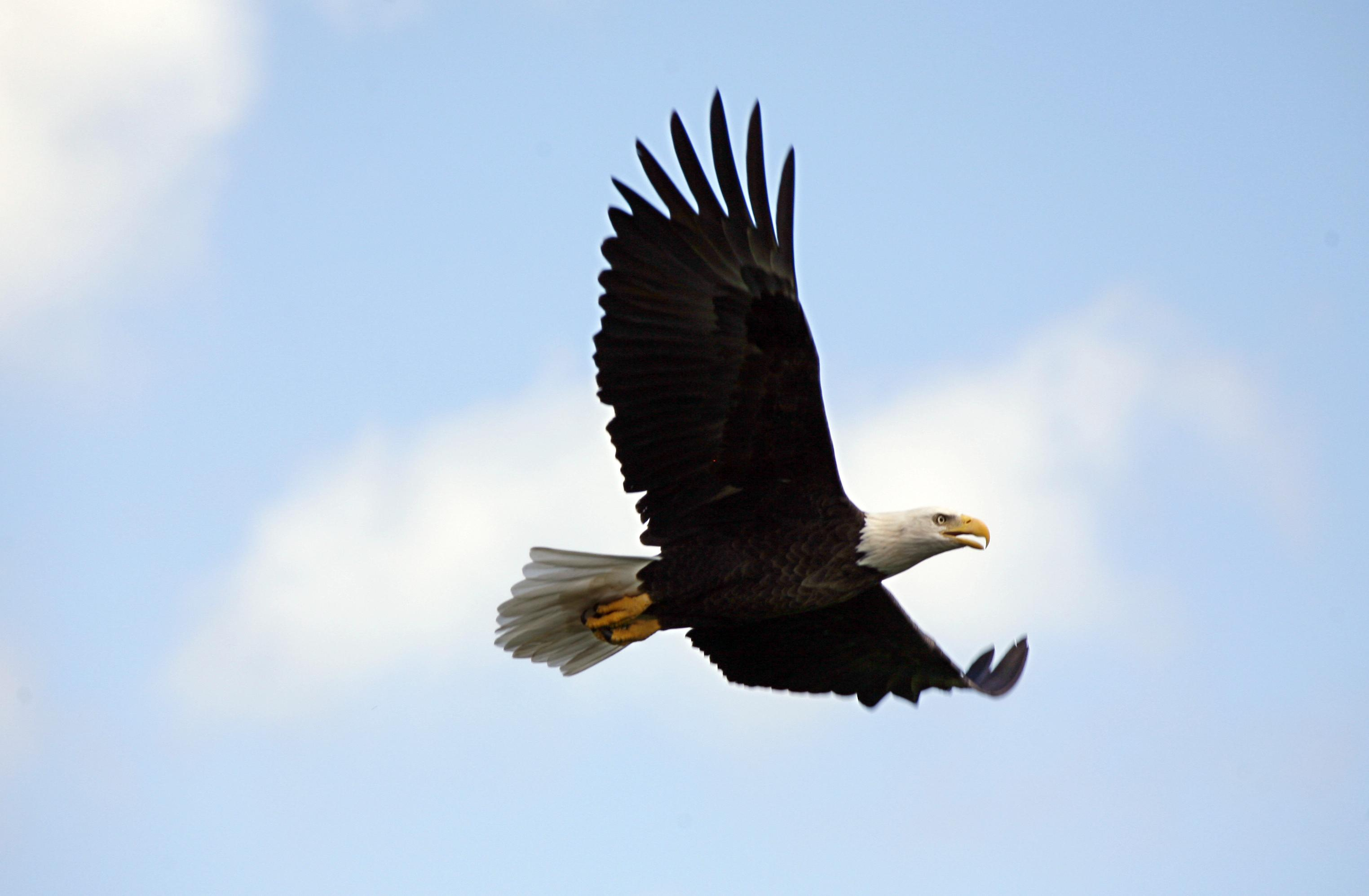
Over 500 bald eagle utilize the region's wetlands for foraging between November and April, especially under the protection within the Bear Valley National Wildlife Refuge.

The following bird species are found in the Klamath Basin, Oregon, and related areas; (a few species listed are only "native" and have a larger continental range). The Klamath Basin is within the Pacific Flyway so, over 350 species can be spotted migrating through the flyover.

Group	Common name	Scientific name	Features	Image
Dippers	American dipper	Cinclus mexicanus		
Thrushes, bluebirds and solitaires	American robin	Turdus migratorius	A resident species frequently seen in towns and lawns.	
Thrushes, bluebirds and solitaires	Western bluebird	Sialia mexicana	Uncommonly observed but known to breed in the Klamath Basin	
Thrushes, bluebirds and solitaires	Mountain bluebird	Sialia currucoides	Resident species	
Thrushes, bluebirds and solitaires	Townsend's solitaire	Myadestes townsendi	Commonly observed; sighting likelihood good in appropriate habitat especially in the fall and winter. Known to breed in the Klamath Basin	
Thrushes, bluebirds and solitaires	Swainson's thrush	Catharus ustulatus	Rarely observed, mostly in the spring through the fall; unlikely to be seen even in appropriate habitat but known to breed in the Klamath Basin	
Thrushes, bluebirds and solitaires	Hermit thrush	Catharus guttatus	Uncommonly observed but known to breed in the Klamath Basin	
Thrushes, bluebirds and solitaires	Varied thrush	Ixoreus naevius or Zoothera naevia	Rarely observed, mostly in the fall and winter; unlikely to be seen even in appropriate habitat but known to breed in the Klamath Basin	
	Anna's hummingbird	Calypte anna		
	Ash-throated flycatcher	Myiarchus cinerascens		
	Barn swallow	Hirundo rustica		
	Bewick's wren	Thryomanes bewickii		
	Black-headed grosbeak	Pheucticus melanocephalus		
	Brewer's blackbird	Euphagus cyanocephalus		
	Brewer's sparrow	Spizella breweri		
	Brown-headed cowbird			
	California quail			
	California towhee			
	Calliope hummingbird	Stellula calliope		
	Canada goose	Branta canadensis		
	Canyon wren	Catherpes mexicanus		
	Cassin's finch	Carpodacus cassinii		
	Chipping sparrow	Spizella passerina		
	Clark's nutcracker	Nucifraga columbiana		
	Common loon	Gavia immer	Uncommonly observed, mostly in the spring and then in the fall	
	Common nighthawk	Chordeiles minor		
	Common raven	Corvus corax		
	Fox sparrow	Passerella iliaca		
	Golden-crowned sparrow	Zonotrichia atricapilla		
	Green-tailed towhee	Pipilo chlorurus		
	Great blue heron	Ardea herodias		
	Horned lark	Eremophila alpestris	Resident species	
	House finch	Carpodacus mexicanus		
	House wren	Troglodytes aedon	Resident species	
	Juniper titmouse	Baeolophus ridgwayi		
	Lazuli bunting	Passerina amoena	Migrant species	
	Lewis's woodpecker	Melanerpes lewis		
	Loggerhead shrike	Lanius ludovicianus	Resident species	
	Mountain chickadee	Poecile gambeli		
	Mourning dove	Zenaida macroura		
	Northern flicker	Colaptes auratus		
	Northern mockingbird	Mimus polyglottos		
	Olive-sided flycatcher	Contopus cooperi	Migrant species	
	Pacific loon	Gavia pacifica	Rarely observed, mostly in the spring and then in the fall; unlikely to be seen even in appropriate habitat	
	Pygmy nuthatch	Sitta pygmaea		
	Red-breasted nuthatch	Sitta canadensis	A permanent resident and an acrobatic species, hitching itself up and down tree trunks and branches.	
	Red crossbill	Loxia curvirostra	Migrant species	
	Red-naped sapsucker	Sphyrapicus nuchalis	Migrant species	
	Common pheasant	Phasianus colchicus		
	Red-tailed hawk	Buteo jamaicensis		
	Red-winged blackbird	Agelaius phoeniceus	Resident species	
	Sage grouse	Centrocercus urophasianus		
	Sage sparrow	Amphispiza belli		
	Sage thrasher	Oreoscoptes montanus	Resident species	
	Savannah sparrow	Passerculus sandwichensis		
	Song sparrow	Melospiza melodia		
	Spotted towhee	Pipilo maculatus		
	Common starling	Sturnus vulgaris	Non-native species, common in widespread areas of the Upper Klamath Basin.	
	Turkey vulture	Cathartes aura		
	Western meadowlark	Sturnella neglecta	A resident and the official state bird of Oregon and other 5 US states.	
	Western tanager	Piranga ludoviciana		
	Western wood pewee	Contopus sordidulus		
	White-breasted nuthatch	Sitta carolinensis		
	White-crowned sparrow	Zonotrichia leucophrys		
	White-faced ibis	Plegadis chihi		
	White-headed woodpecker	Picoides albolarvatus	Resident species	
	Yellow warbler	Dendroica petechia	A migrant species that lives in the basin during the spring and summer.	

== See also ==
- Amphibians and reptiles of Oregon
- List of birds of Oregon
- List of native Oregon plants
- Lists of Oregon-related topics
- Audubon Society of Portland
