= Henderson Bird Viewing Preserve =

Nature preserve in Nevada

- IUCN category IV (habitat/species management area)
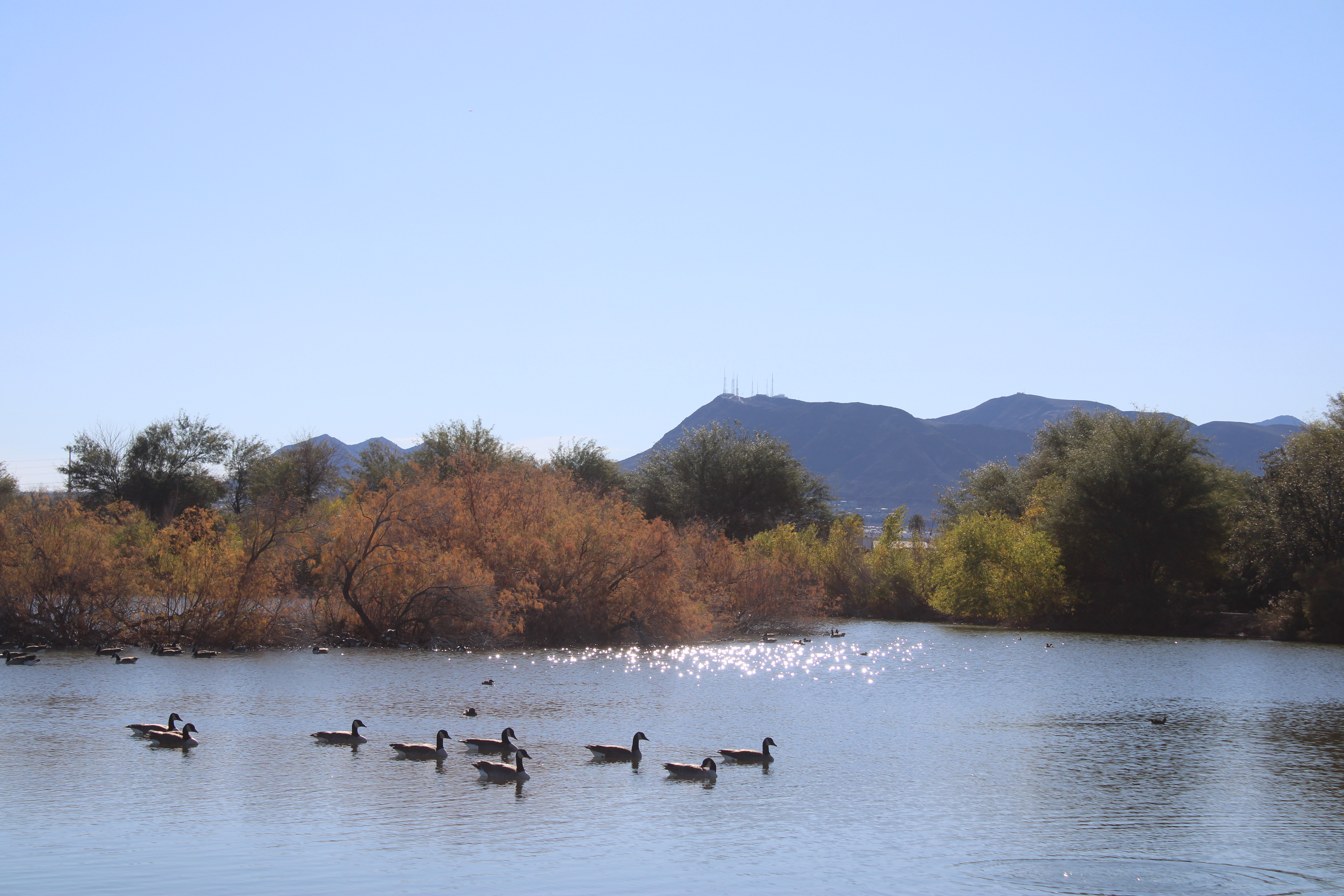
- The preserve in 2025

- Location within Nevada Location within the United States
- Location: 350 E Galleria Dr, Henderson, NV 89011
- Coordinates: 36.0752°N 115.0022°W
- Area: 140 acres (57 ha)
- Established: May 20, 1998
- Visitors: 12,000 (2016)

The Henderson Bird Viewing Preserve is a bird reserve in Henderson, Nevada. It located in a water reclamation plant and is known for its thousands of migratory waterfowl that can be found near the park because of its spot on the Pacific Flyway. The preserve contains nine ponds and 5 mi (8.0 km) of trails.

== History ==
The city's water reclamation plant, which treats wastewater for irrigation or discharge, is the third-largest body of water in Southern Nevada. Its size led to it being a popular stop for migratory birds and also native shorebirds. In 1967, Audubon first included it in its Christmas Bird Count. The birders were welcomed by the city of Henderson, with them even printing a guide to species that can be found at the ponds. However, workers at the plant were unable to balance maintaining the plant and respecting the birds, as they had to remove vegetation and frequently drain the ponds to upkeep the plant.

In 1995, the city began to officially recognize birding and made steps to accommodate the birds, including leaving vegetation in certain areas and only draining the pond when bird nesting is out of season. A meeting took place between representatives from the city's Department of Utility Services, the Red Rock Audubon Society, and MWH Global in December 1996 to create an actual birding preserve. The mayor, James B. Gibson, and the city council approved the idea on July 15, 1997. Ground was broken on March 9, 1998, and it the sanctuary was dedicated on May 20.

In 2011, the preserve underwent a $1.9 million renovation. All but $100,000 was paid by a grant from the Bureau of Land Management, and the remaining money was fundraised by the city's Department of Utility Services. Bird blinds, observation decks, and a new road were added. The preserve had its visitation double to triple during the COVID-19 pandemic. In 2024, the Nevada Department of Conservation and Natural Resources gave a $400,000 grant to improve the pathways along the preserve. It was matched with an additional $100,000 in funding.
