= Klamath Basin National Wildlife Refuge Complex =

Protected area in the United States

- IUCN category IV (habitat/species management area)
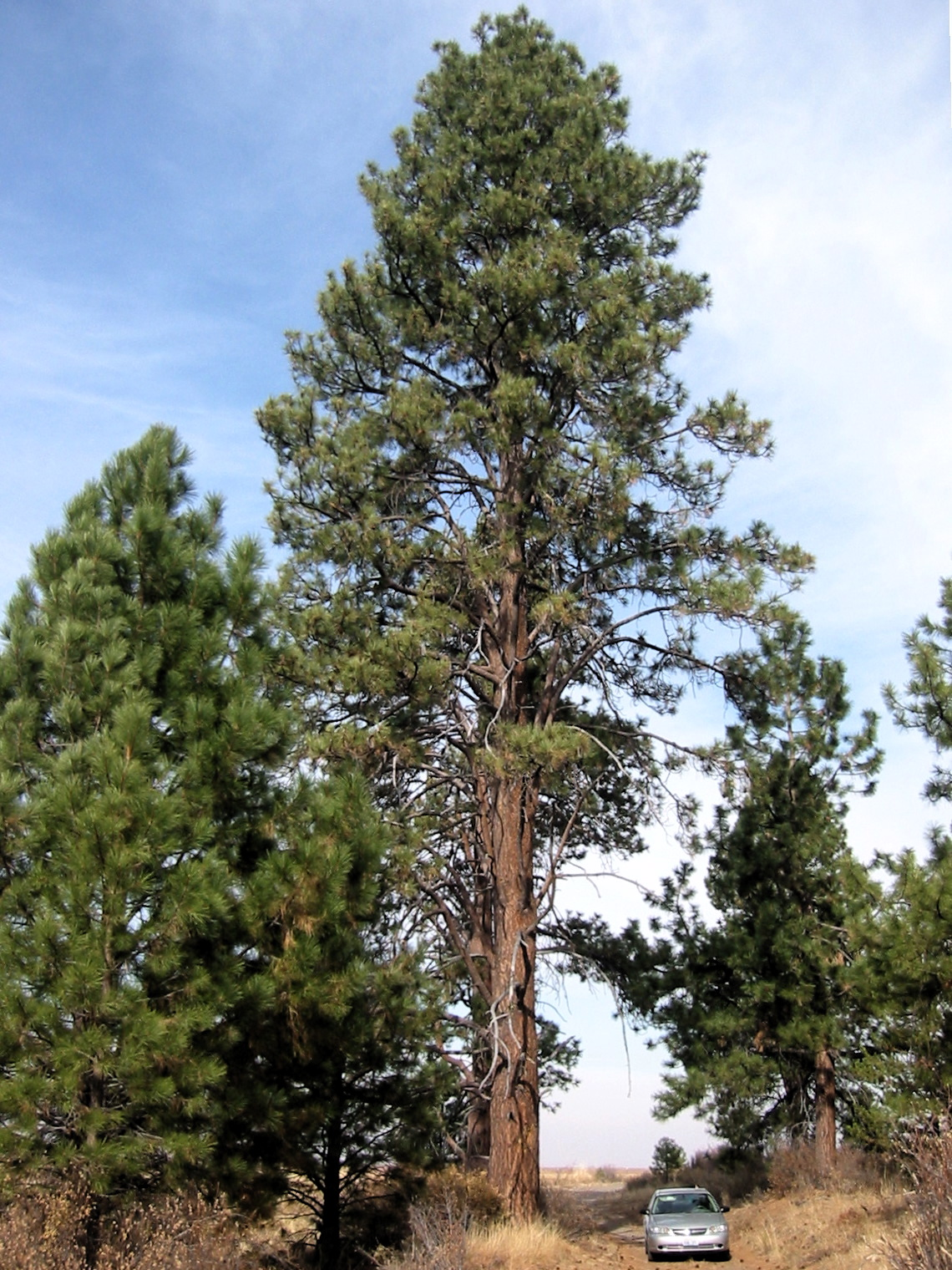
- Ponderosa Pine, Klamath Marsh

- Location within the United States
- Location: Oregon and California, United States
- Nearest city: Klamath Falls, OR
- Coordinates: 41°56′48″N 121°33′54″W
- Area: 192,000 acres (780 km^{2})
- Established: 1908
- Governing body: United States Fish and Wildlife Service

The Klamath Basin National Wildlife Refuge Complex is a wildlife preserve operated by the United States Fish and Wildlife Service in the Klamath Basin of southern Oregon and northern California near Klamath Falls, Oregon. It consists of Bear Valley, Klamath Marsh and Upper Klamath National Wildlife Refuge (NWR) in southern Oregon and Lower Klamath, Tule Lake, and Clear Lake NWR in northern California.

Lower Klamath NWR, established in 1908, was the first waterfowl refuge in the United States. Consisting of 46,900 acre (190 km^{2}), it includes shallow freshwater marshes, open water, grassy uplands, and croplands that are intensively managed to provide feeding, resting, nesting, and brood rearing habitat for waterfowl and other water birds.

Clear Lake NWR, established in 1911, has an area of 46,460 acres (188.0 km^{2}). About 20,000 acres (81 km^{2}) is open water. The balance is the surrounding upland habitat of bunchgrass, low sagebrush, and juniper.

Upper Klamath NWR, established in 1928, is composed of 15,000 acres (61 km^{2}) of mostly freshwater marsh and open water.

Tule Lake NWR, established in 1928, encompasses 39,116 acres (158.30 km^{2}) of mostly open water and croplands.

Klamath Marsh NWR, established in 1958, consists of 40,646 acres (164.49 km^{2}) of freshwater marsh and adjacent meadows.

Bear Valley NWR, established in 1978, protects a vital night roost site for wintering bald eagles. It consists of 4,200 acres (17 km^{2}) of largely old growth ponderosa pine, incense-cedar, white fir and Douglas-fir forest.

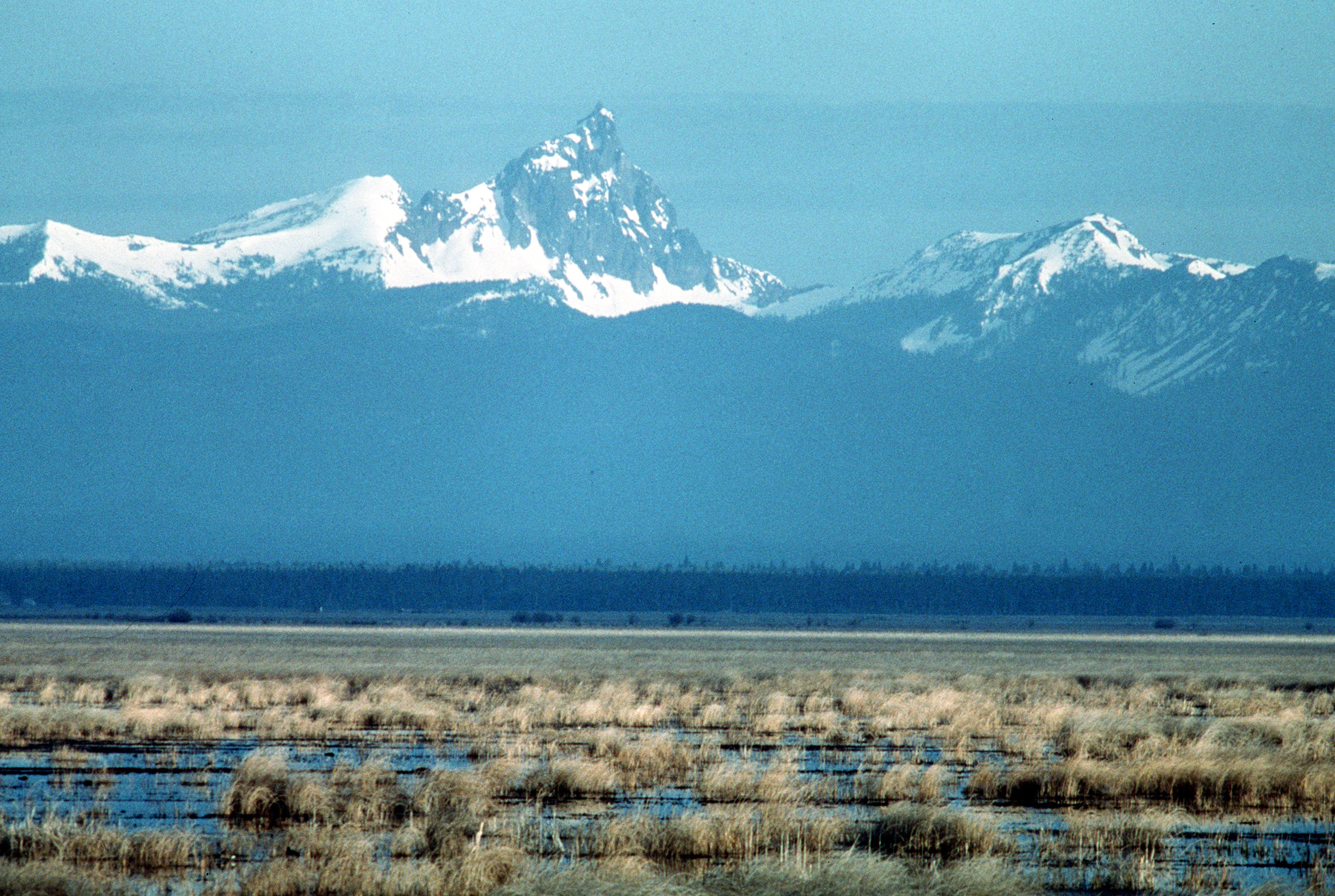
Lower Klamath National Wildlife Refuge

Historically, the Klamath Basin was dominated by approximately 185,000 acres (749 km^{2}) of shallow lakes and freshwater marshes. These extensive wetlands attracted peak fall concentrations of over 6 million waterfowl and supported abundant populations of other water birds including American white pelican, double-crested cormorant, and several heron species.

In 1905, the U.S. Bureau of Reclamation initiated the Klamath Reclamation Project to convert the lakes and marshes of the Lower Klamath Lake and Tule Lake areas to agricultural lands. As these wetlands receded, the reclaimed lands were opened to agricultural development and settlement. Today, less than 25% of the historic wetlands remain.

To conserve much of the Basin's remaining wetland habitat, the six National Wildlife Refuges have been established. The U.S. Fish and Wildlife Service manages these Refuges to enhance wildlife and benefit the American people. Agricultural and water programs are coordinated under an agreement between the Fish and Wildlife Service and the Bureau of Reclamation.

Klamath Basin Refuges consist of a variety of habitats including freshwater marshes, open water, grassy meadows, coniferous forests, sagebrush and juniper grasslands, agricultural lands, and rocky cliffs and slopes. These habitats support diverse and abundant populations of resident and migratory wildlife with 433 species having been observed on or near the Refuges. In addition, each year the Refuges serve as a migratory stopover for about three-quarters of the Pacific Flyway waterfowl, with peak fall concentrations of over 1 million birds. The Klamath Refuge has been described as "the heartbeat of the Pacific Flyway".

== Units include ==
- Bear Valley National Wildlife Refuge
- Clear Lake National Wildlife Refuge
- Klamath Marsh National Wildlife Refuge
- Lower Klamath National Wildlife Refuge
- Tule Lake National Wildlife Refuge
- Upper Klamath National Wildlife Refuge

== See also ==
- List of National Wildlife Refuges
