= Bear Valley National Wildlife Refuge =

Wildlife refuge in Oregon, United States

- IUCN category IV (habitat/species management area)
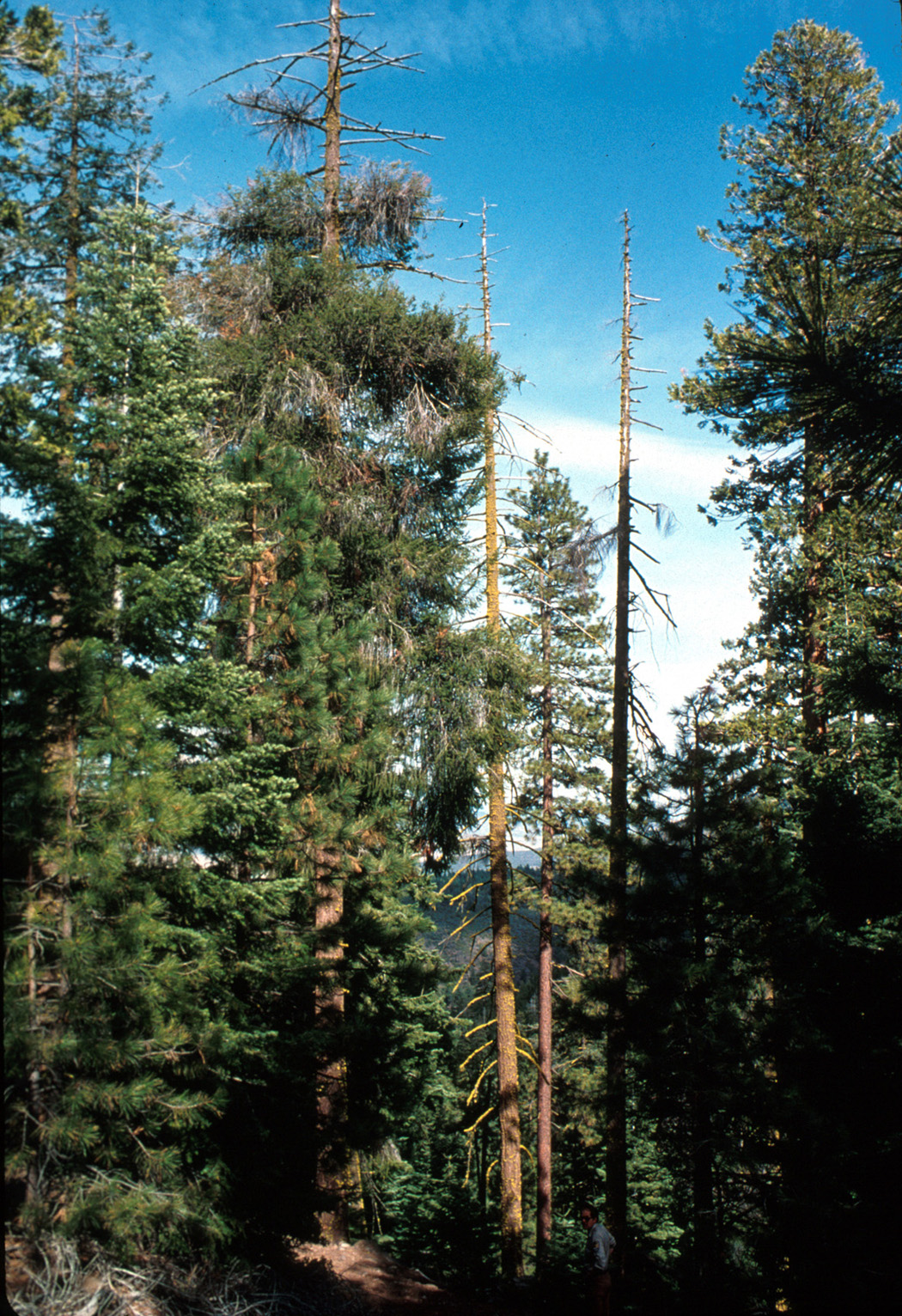
- Trees in the Bear Valley National Wildlife Refuge

- Location within Oregon
- Location: Klamath County, Oregon, U.S.A.
- Nearest city: Klamath Falls, Oregon
- Coordinates: 42.0498684°N 121.9011159°W
- Area: 4,200 acres (1,700 ha)
- Established: 1978
- Governing body: U.S. Fish and Wildlife Service
- Website: Bear Valley NWR

The Bear Valley National Wildlife Refuge is a wildlife refuge in the southwestern part of Klamath County, Oregon, near the California border. It was established in 1978 to protect the nesting areas of bald eagles. The refuge is part of the Klamath Basin National Wildlife Refuge Complex and has an area of 4,200 acres (1,700 ha) It is administered along with the other refuges in the complex from offices in Tulelake, California.

== See also ==
- List of Klamath Basin birds
- List of National Wildlife Refuges of the United States
