= Wheatgrass (disambiguation) =

Wheatgrass is the freshly sprouted first leaves of the common wheat plant, grown for human consumption.

Wheatgrass may also refer to:

- Agropyron, a genus known as crested-wheat grasses
- Elymus (plant), a genus of wild rye, sometimes called wheatgrass
- Eremopyrum, a genus in the sub-family Pooideae, known as false wheatgrass
- Pascopyrum, a genus known as wheatgrass
- Pseudelymus, a genus called foxtail wheatgrass
- Pseudoroegneria, a genus in the sub-family Pooideae, known as wheatgrass
- Thinopyrum, a genus in the sub-family Pooideae, known as wheatgrass
  - Wild Triga (Thinopyrum intermedium), intermediate wheatgrass for human consumption
  - Thinopyrum ponticum, tall wheatgrass

== See also ==
- Common wheat, Triticum aestivum
- Wheat (disambiguation)
- Pooideae, a subfamily of grasses
