= Klamath Marsh National Wildlife Refuge =

Protected area in Oregon, United States

- IUCN category IV (habitat/species management area)
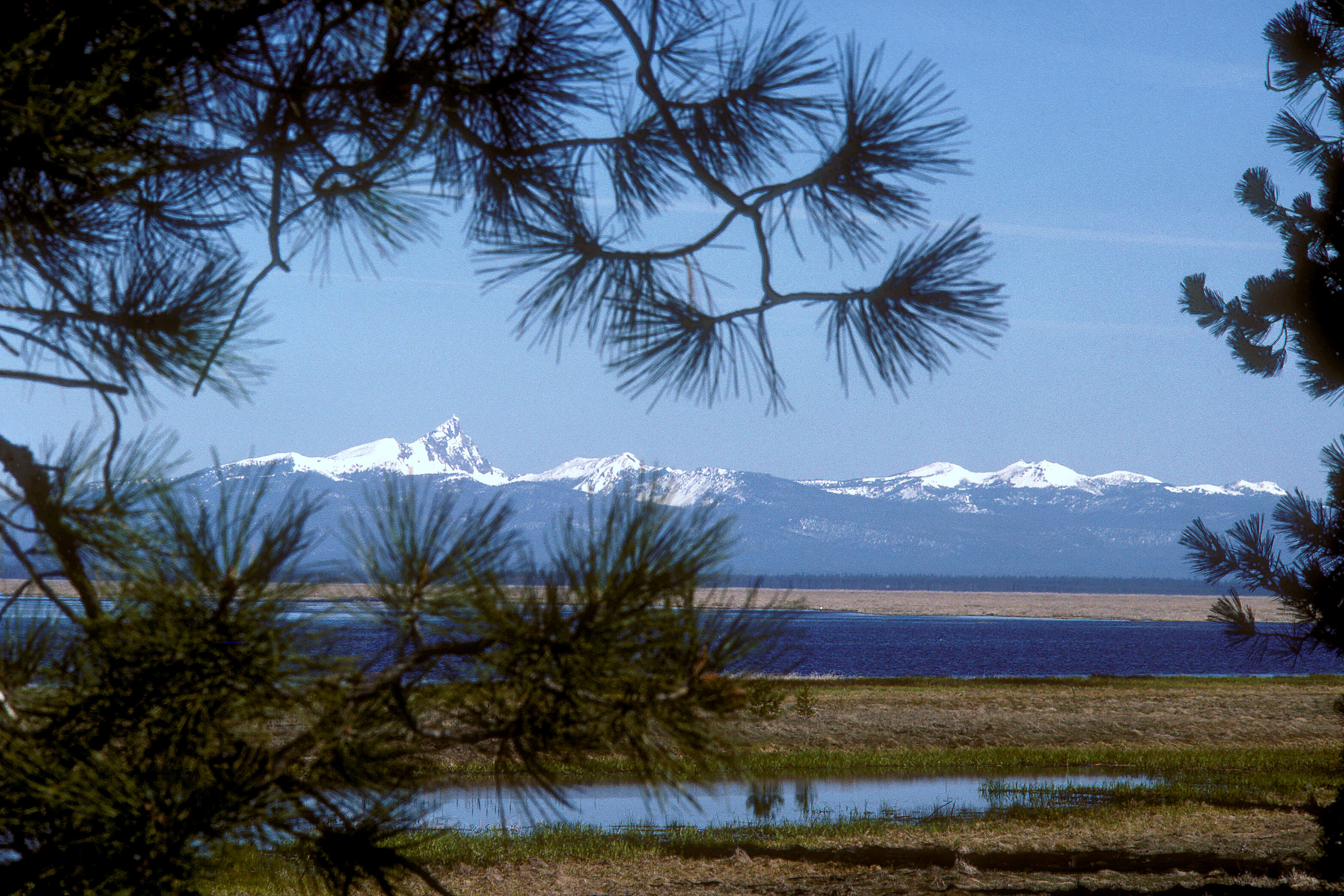

- Location within Oregon
- Location: Klamath County, Oregon, USA
- Nearest city: Klamath Falls, Oregon
- Coordinates: 42°54′29″N 121°41′04″W
- Area: 40,885 acres (16,546 ha)
- Established: 1958
- Governing body: U.S. Fish and Wildlife Service
- Website: Klamath Marsh NWR

Klamath Marsh National Wildlife Refuge was established in 1958 as an inviolate sanctuary, or for any other management purpose, for migratory birds. The refuge primarily consists of 40,000 acres. Originally designated as Klamath Forest National Wildlife Refuge, the Refuge was renamed as virtually all of the historic Klamath Marsh now lies within Refuge boundaries. This large natural marsh provides important nesting, feeding, and resting habitat for waterfowl, while the surrounding meadowlands are attractive nesting and feeding areas for sandhill crane, yellow rail, and various shorebirds and raptors. The adjacent pine forests also support diverse wildlife including the great gray owl and Rocky Mountain elk. During summer months, opportunities to canoe in Wocus Bay allow for wildlife observation and a great scenic route.
