= Colorado River Delta =

River delta in Baja California and Sonora, Mexico

- River delta
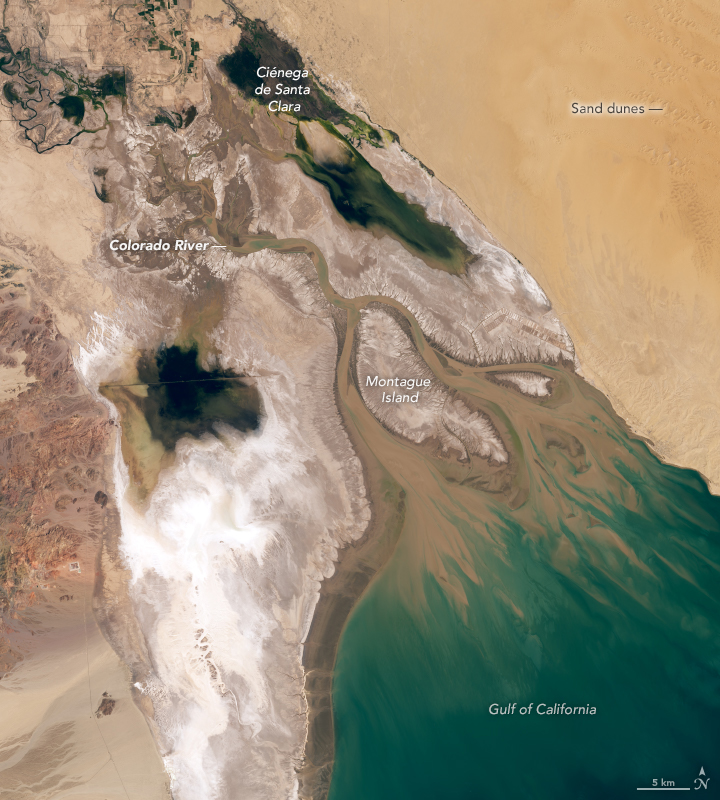
- Satellite view of the Colorado River Delta featuring Isla Montague and the Ciénega de Santa Clara wetland

- Location within Mexico Location within North America
- Coordinates: 31°44′N 114°40′W
- Location: Baja California and Sonora, Mexico
- Part of: Colorado River
- Water bodies: Gulf of California

Area
  - Total: 7,810 hectares (19,300 acres) (historical)
Designations
Ramsar Wetland
- Official name: Humedales del Delta del Río Colorado
- Designated: 20 March 1996
- Reference no.: 814

The Colorado River Delta is the region where the Colorado River once flowed into the Gulf of California (also known as the Sea of Cortez) in eastern Mexicali Municipality in the north of the state of Baja California, in northwestern Mexico. The delta is part of a larger geologic region called the Salton Trough. Historically, the interaction of the river's flow and the ocean's tide created a dynamic environment, supporting freshwater, brackish, and saltwater species. Within the delta region, the river split into multiple braided channels and formed a complex estuary and terrestrial ecosystems. The use of water upstream and the accompanying reduction of freshwater flow has resulted in the loss of most of the wetlands of the area, as well as drastic changes to the aquatic ecosystems - an ecosystem collapse.

== Natural history ==
Until the early 20th century, the Colorado River ran free from its headwaters in the Rocky Mountains of Colorado southwest into Mexico, where it flowed into the Gulf of California. Significant quantities of nourishing silt from throughout the Colorado River Basin were carried downstream, creating the vast Colorado River Delta and preventing intrusion of seawater into the Mexicali and Imperial Valleys.

Prior to the construction of major dams along its route, the Colorado River fed one of the largest desert estuaries in the world. Spread across the northernmost end of the Gulf of California, the Colorado River delta's vast riparian, freshwater, brackish, and tidal wetlands once covered 7,810 km^{2} (1,930,000 acres) and supported a large population of plant, bird, aquatic, and terrestrial life. Because most of the river's flow reached the delta at that time, its freshwater, silt, and nutrients helped create and sustain a complex system of estuarial wetlands that provided feeding and nesting grounds for birds, and spawning habitat for fish and marine mammals. In contrast to the surrounding Sonoran Desert, the Colorado River delta's abundance was striking.

== Human history ==
=== Early history ===
Early explorers reported jaguars, beavers, deer, and coyotes in the delta, in addition to the abundance of waterfowl, fish, and other marine and estuary organisms (Spamer, 1990; {Aldo Leopold, 1948}). Early explorers also encountered local people known as the Cucapá, or the people of the river. The Cucapá are descendants of the Yuman-speaking Native Indigenous peoples of the Americas and have inhabited the delta for nearly a thousand years. Spanish explorer Hernando de Alarcón made the first recorded contact with the Cucapá in 1540 and reported seeing many thousands. The Cucapá used the delta floodplain extensively for harvesting Palmer's saltgrass (Distichlis palmeri), a wild grain that grows in salty soil, and for cultivating maize (corn), beans, and squash.

On the map the Delta was bisected by the river, but in fact the river was nowhere and everywhere, for he could not decide which of a hundred green lagoons offered the most pleasant and least speedy path to the Gulf.

— Aldo Leopold, from A Sand County Almanac, describing the Colorado River Delta as it existed in 1922

=== After dam construction ===
Today, conditions in the delta have changed. Like other desert river deltas, such as the Nile Delta and the Indus River Delta, the Colorado River delta has been greatly altered by human activity. Decades of dam construction and water diversions in the United States and Mexico have reduced the delta to a remnant system of small wetlands and brackish mudflats. As reservoirs filled behind dams and captured floodwaters, freshwater could no longer reach the delta.

The construction of Hoover Dam in the 1930s marked the beginning of the modern era for the Colorado River Delta. For six years, as Lake Mead filled behind the dam, virtually no freshwater reached the delta. Even spring flooding was captured. This ecologically devastating event was repeated from 1963 to 1981 as Lake Powell filled behind the Glen Canyon Dam. With these reservoirs now filled, the dams are used to regulate flow so that water can be reliably apportioned among the users of the Colorado River Compact, and its use maximized. Most flood flows can be contained, regulated, and added to the river's capacity to sustain the Western United States' urban centers and agriculture. Floodwaters are released only when the Bureau of Reclamation, the agency managing the dams, predicts flows that exceed the system's capacity for use and storage.

The loss of freshwater flows to the delta over the twentieth century has reduced delta wetlands to about 5 percent of their original extent, and non-native species have compromised the ecological health of much of what remains. Stress on ecosystems has allowed invasive plants to out-compete native species along Colorado River riparian areas. Native forests of cottonwood and willow have yielded to sand and mudflats dominated by the nonnative tamarisk (also known as salt cedar), arrow-weed, and iodine bush, a transformation that has decreased the habitat value of the riparian forest.

=== High flows in 1980s ===
Full reservoir conditions coupled with a series of flood events throughout the 1980s and early 1990s resulted in flood releases that reached the delta. These flows reestablished an active floodplain and revegetated many areas of the floodplain within irrigation and flood control levels, and helped to reestablish riparian forests. A scheme is currently in place which aims to rejuvenate the wetlands by releasing a pulse of water down the river delta every few years.

== Ecology ==
The delta supports a variety of wildlife, including several threatened and endangered species. Mexico's Environmental Regulations on Endangered Species lists the following endangered species found in the terrestrial and aquatic regions of the delta (Diario Officiel, 1994):

- the desert pupfish, also listed as an endangered species in the U.S., the largest remaining population anywhere is in the Ciénega de Santa Clara
- the Yuma rail, also listed as endangered in the U.S.
- the bobcat
- the vaquita porpoise, the world's smallest marine cetacean, listed as a species of special concern by the U.S. Marine Mammal Commission. There are thought to be 12 vaquitas left in the world.
- the totoaba, now virtually extinct, a steel-blue fish that grows up to 2 m (7 ft) and 136 kg (300 pounds), and once supported a commercial fishery that closed in 1975 (Postel et al., n.d.).
- the Colorado delta clam, once an extremely abundant species and important in the trophic dynamics of the ecosystem.

Although not extensively studied, the delta's significance for migratory birds is indisputable, as it is the principal freshwater marsh in the region. A total of 358 bird species have been documented in the Colorado River Delta and the upper Gulf of California region. From these, two are listed as endangered, six as threatened, and sixteen are under special protection in Mexico. Two wintering species and five breeding species have been locally extirpated, including the southwestern willow flycatcher, the fulvous whistling duck, and the sandhill crane.

== Biosphere reserve ==
The Gulf of California lies within the jurisdictional boundaries of Mexico and its states of Baja California and Sonora. In 1974, the Mexican government designated portions of the upper Gulf and lower Colorado River Delta as a reserve zone.

The United Nations Educational, Scientific and Cultural Organization (UNESCO) designated over 12,000 km^{2} (3,000,000 acres) of Gulf of California and Colorado River Delta Biosphere Reserve as a Biosphere Nature reserve in June 1993. Within this 12,000 km^{2} (3,000,000 acres), over 4,000 km^{2} (990,000 acres) nearest the Colorado River Delta are designated as the Reserve "core area", with the remaining 8,000 km^{2} (2,000,000 acres) of open water and shoreline designated as a "buffer area".

UNESCO considers areas for designation as Biosphere Reserves only after the nation in which the site is located submits a nomination. Once designated, Biosphere Reserves remain under the sovereign jurisdiction of the countries where they are located. Federal Mexican governmental agencies with administrative authority over the Biosphere Reserve include the National Commission of Protected Natural Areas (CONANP) and the Secretary of the Environment, Natural Resources and Fisheries (SEMARNAP).

In addition to designation as a Biosphere Reserve, 2,500 km^{2} (620,000 acres) within Colorado River Delta (Humedales del Delta del Río Colorado) are designated as a Ramsar Wetland under the U.N. Convention on Wetlands. Ramsar Wetlands are wetlands of international importance in terms of their ecology, botany, zoology, limnology or hydrology. The U.N. designation is considered following a nomination by the nation in which the site is located.

== View ==
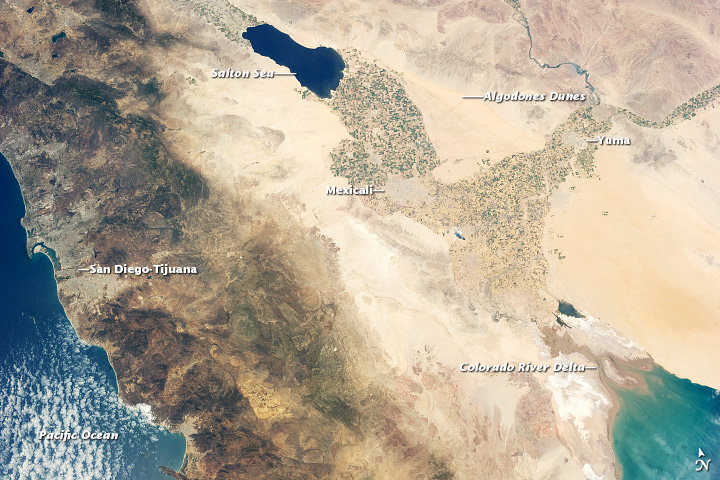
The region from orbit.

== See also ==
- Aral Sea
