= List of freshwater ecoregions (WWF) =

This is a list of freshwater ecoregions as compiled by the World Wildlife Fund (WWF). The freshwater ecoregion system is similar to that for terrestrial ecoregions. The Earth's land surface is divided into eight terrestrial biogeographic realms or ecozones, which contain hundreds of smaller ecoregions. Ecoregions are classified into biomes or major habitat types, which have similar climates and vegetation types. The freshwater system is similar, with ecoregions classified into freshwater realms and biomes.

== Afrotropical ==
Ecoregions are sorted by biome (major habitat type). The numbers are WWF's ecoregion codes.

=== Large lakes ===
- 559; Lake Malawi; (Malawi, Mozambique, Tanzania)
- 565; Lake Rukwa; (Tanzania)
- 542; Lake Tanganyika; (Burundi, Democratic Republic of the Congo, Rwanda, Tanzania, Zambia)
- 530; Lake Turkana; (Kenya)
- 521; Lake Victoria Basin; (Burundi, Democratic Republic of the Congo, Kenya, Tanzania, Uganda)

=== Large river deltas ===
- 506; Niger Delta;

=== Montane freshwaters ===
- 541; Albertine Highlands;
- 577; Amatolo - Winterberg Highlands;
- 574; Drakensberg - Maluti Highlands;
- 563; Eastern Zimbabwe Highlands;
- 525; Ethiopian Highlands;
- 510; Fouta Djallon;
- 526; Lake Tana;
- 581; Madagascar Eastern Highlands;
- 513; Mount Nimba;
- 562; Mulanje;
- 519; Western Equatorial Crater Lakes;

=== Oceanic Islands ===
- 584; Comoros-Mayotte;
- 586; Mascarenes;
- 585; Seychelles;

=== Temperate coastal rivers ===
- 578; Cape Fold;

=== Temperate upland rivers ===
- 575; Southern Temperate Highveld;

=== Tropical and subtropical coastal rivers ===
- 515; Ashanti;
- 517; Bight Drainages;
- 564; Coastal East Africa;
- 551; Cuanza;
- 514; Eburneo;
- 583; Madagascar Eastern Lowlands;
- 533; Northern Gulf of Guinea Drainages - Bioko;
- 511; Northern Upper Guinea;
- 532; Ogooue - Nyanga - Kouilou - Niari;
- 568; Pangani;
- 587; São Tomé, Príncipe, and Annobón;
- 518; Southern Gulf of Guinea Drainages;
- 512; Southern Upper Guinea;
- 567; Tana, Athi and Coastal Drainages;
- 576; Zambezian Lowveld;

=== Tropical and subtropical floodplain rivers and wetland complexes ===
- 544; Bangweulu Wetlands - Mweru;
- 537; Cuvette Centrale;
- 508; Inner Niger Delta;
- 557; Kafue;
- 546; Kasai;
- 550; Lower Congo;
- 549; Lower Congo Rapids;
- 505; Lower Niger - Benue;
- 561; Lower Zambezi;
- 547; Mai-Ndombe;
- 543; Malagarasi-Moyowosi;
- 548; Malebo Pool;
- 558; Middle Zambezi - Luangwa;
- 580; Northwestern Madagascar;
- 569; Okavango;
- 534; Sangha;
- 509; Senegal - Gambia;
- 535; Sudanic Congo - Oubangi;
- 538; Tumba;
- 539; Upper Congo Rapids;
- 545; Upper Lualaba;
- 522; Upper Nile;
- 556; Upper Zambezi Floodplains;
- 516; Volta;

=== Tropical and subtropical upland rivers ===
- 536; Uele;
- 540; Upper Congo;
- 507; Upper Niger;
- 555; Zambezian Headwaters;
- 560; Zambezian Highveld;

=== Xeric freshwaters and endorheic (closed) basins ===
- 553; Etosha;
- 529; Horn of Africa;
- 570; Kalahari;
- 573; Karoo;
- 554; Karstveld Sink Holes;
- 520; Lake Chad;
- 552; Namib;
- 528; Northern Eastern Rift;
- 443; Oman Mountains;
- 531; Shebelle - Jubba;
- 566; Southern Eastern Rift;
- 571; Southern Kalahari;
- 582; Southern Madagascar;
- 439; Southwestern Arabian Coast;
- 579; Western Madagascar;
- 572; Western Orange;

== Australasia ==
=== Montane freshwaters ===
- 751; Lake Poso;
- 750; Matano - Southern Malili Lakes;
- 814; New Guinea Central Mountains;
- 813; New Guinea North Coast;

=== Temperate coastal rivers ===
- 809; Bass Strait Drainages;
- 807; Eastern Coastal Australia;
- 811; New Zealand;
- 810; Southern Tasmania;
- 801; Southwestern Australia;

=== Temperate floodplain rivers and wetlands ===
- 808; Murray – Darling;

=== Tropical and subtropical coastal rivers ===
- 805; Arafura - Carpentaria;
- 817; Bismarck Archipelago;
- 803; Kimberley;
- 748; Lesser Sunda Islands;
- 747; Maluku; (Indonesia)
- 820; New Caledonia;
- 816; Papuan Peninsula;
- 818; Solomon Islands;
- 815; Southwest New Guinea - Trans-Fly Lowland;
- 749; Sulawesi;
- 812; Vogelkop - Bomberai;

=== Xeric freshwaters and endorheic (closed) basins ===
- 806; Great Artesian Basin;
- 804; Paleo;
- 802; Pilbara;

== Indomalaya ==
=== Large river deltas ===
- 729; Mekong Delta;

=== Montane freshwaters ===
- 743; Borneo Highlands;
- 710; Ganges Himalayan Foothills;
- 723; Inle Lake;
- 753; Lake Lanao;

=== Oceanic Islands ===
- 768; Andaman Islands;
- 769; Nicobar Islands;

=== Tropical and subtropical coastal rivers ===
- 736; Aceh;
- 740; Central & Eastern Java;
- ; Chin Hills - Arakan Coast
- 767; Coastal Fujian - Zhejiang;
- 745; Eastern Borneo;
- 731; Eastern Gulf of Thailand Drainages;
- 758; Eastern Taiwan;
- 759; Hainan;
- 737; Indian Ocean Slope of Sumatra & Java;
- 741; Kapuas;
- 719; Lower Brahmaputra - Arakan Coast;
- 734; Malay Peninsula Eastern Slope;
- 752; Mindanao;
- 744; Northeastern Borneo;
- 760; Northern Annam;
- 735; Northern Central Sumatra - Western Malaysia;
- 755; Northern Philippine Islands;
- 742; Northwestern Borneo;
- 756; Palawan - Busuanga - Mindoro;
- 746; Southeastern Borneo;
- 716; Southeastern Ghats;
- 730; Southern Annam;
- 738; Southern Central Sumatra;
- 739; Southern Sumatra - Western Java;
- 717; Sri Lanka Dry Zone;
- 718; Sri Lanka Wet Zone;
- 715; Western Ghats;
- 757; Western Taiwan;

=== Tropical and subtropical floodplain rivers and wetland complexes ===
- 732; Chao Phraya;
- 709; Ganges Delta and Plain;
- 728; Kretie - Stung Treng (Mekong);
- 703; Lower & Middle Indus;
- 722; Lower & Middle Salween;
- 726; Lower Lan Cang (Mekong);
- 733; Mae Khlong;
- 708; Narmada - Tapti;
- 713; Northern Deccan Plateau;
- 720; Sitang - Irrawaddy;
- 761; Song Hong;
- 714; Southern Deccan Plateau;
- 763; Xi Yiang;

=== Tropical and subtropical upland rivers ===
- 727; Khorat Plateau (Mekong);
- 712; Middle Brahmaputra;

== Nearctic ==
=== Large lakes ===
- 109; English - Winnipeg Lakes;
- 116; Laurentian Great Lakes;

=== Oceanic Islands ===
- 176; Bermuda;

=== Polar freshwaters ===
- 101; Alaskan Coastal;
- 112; Canadian Arctic Archipelago;
- 106; Central Arctic Coastal;
- 105; Lower Mackenzie;
- 102; Upper Yukon;
- 111; Western Hudson Bay;

=== Temperate coastal rivers ===
- 103; Alaska & Canada Pacific Coastal;
- 157; Appalachian Piedmont;
- 115; Canadian Atlantic Islands;
- 158; Chesapeake Bay;
- 140; East Texas Gulf;
- 113; Eastern Hudson Bay - Ungava;
- 114; Gulf of St.Lawrence Coastal Drainages;
- 118; Northeast US & Southeast Canada Atlantic Drainages;
- 123; Oregon & Northern California Coastal;
- 141; Sabine - Galveston;
- 125; Sacramento–San Joaquin;
- 119; Scotia - Fundy;
- 110; Southern Hudson Bay;
- 117; St.Lawrence;
- 154; West Florida Gulf;

=== Temperate floodplain rivers and wetlands ===
- 155; Apalachicola;
- 121; Columbia Unglaciated;
- 149; Lower Mississippi;
- 135; Lower Rio Grande - Bravo;
- 143; Middle Missouri;
- 153; Mobile Bay;
- 104; Upper Mackenzie;
- 148; Upper Mississippi;

=== Temperate upland rivers ===
- 146; Central Prairie;
- 120; Columbia Glaciated;
- 151; Cumberland;
- 108; Middle Saskatchewan;
- 145; Ouachita Highlands;
- 147; Ozark Highlands;
- 150; Teays - Old Ohio;
- 152; Tennessee;
- 142; Upper Missouri;
- 132; Upper Rio Grande - Bravo;
- 107; Upper Saskatchewan;
- 122; Upper Snake;
- 144; US Southern Plains;

=== Tropical and subtropical coastal rivers ===
- 156; Florida Peninsula;
- 162; Sinaloa;
- 139; West Texas Gulf;

=== Xeric freshwaters and endorheic (closed) basins ===
- 127; Bonneville;
- 130; Colorado River;
- 136; Cuatro Ciénegas;
- 128; Death Valley;
- 131; Gila;
- 161; Guzmán–Samalayuca;
- 126; Lahontan;
- 165; Lerma - Chapala;
- 166; Llanos el Salado;
- 163; Mayran - Viesca;
- 124; Oregon Lakes;
- 133; Pecos;
- 134; Rio Conchos;
- 137; Salt River (Arizona);
- 138; Rio San Juan (Mexico);
- 160; Sonora;
- 159; Southern California Coastal–Baja California;
- 129; Vegas - Virgin;

== Neotropic ==
=== Large lakes ===
- 303; Maracaibo;

=== Large river deltas ===
- 323; Amazonas Estuary & Coastal Drainages;
- 309; Orinoco Delta & Coastal Drainages;

=== Montane freshwaters ===
- 312; Amazonas High Andes;
- 340; Cuyan - Desaguadero;
- 305; Orinoco High Andes;
- 306; Orinoco Piedmont;
- 317; Ucayali - Urubamba Piedmont;
- 313; Western Amazon Piedmont;

=== Oceanic Islands ===
- 350; Galápagos Islands;
- 351; Juan Fernández Islands;

=== Temperate coastal rivers ===
- 347; Bonaerensean Drainages;
- 334; Laguna dos Patos;
- 348; Patagonia;
- 341; South Andean Pacific Slopes;
- 349; Valdivian Lakes;

=== Temperate floodplain rivers and wetlands ===
- 345; Lower Paraná;

=== Tropical and subtropical coastal rivers ===
- 168; Ameca - Manantlan;
- 212; Bahama Archipelago;
- 209; Chagres;
- 201; Chiapas - Fonseca;
- 206; Chiriquí River;
- 172; Coatzacoalcos;
- 211; Cuba - Cayman Islands;
- 204; Estero Real - Tempisque;
- 352; Fluminense;
- 173; Grijalva - Usumacinta;
- 214; Hispaniola;
- 207; Isthmus Caribbean;
- 213; Jamaica;
- 203; Mosquitia;
- 301; North Andean Pacific Slopes - Rio Atrato;
- 326; Northeastern Caatinga & Coastal Drainages;
- 328; Northeastern Mata Atlantica;
- 167; Panuco;
- 171; Papaloapan;
- 329; Paraíba do Sul;
- 215; Puerto Rico - Virgin Islands;
- 202; Quintana Roo - Motagua;
- 330; Ribeira de Iguape;
- 169; Rio Balsas;
- 164; Rio Santiago;
- 210; Rio Tuira;
- 205; San Juan (Nicaragua/Costa Rica);
- 208; Santa Maria;
- 170; Sierra Madre del Sur;
- 304; South America Caribbean Drainages - Trinidad;
- 331; Southeastern Mata Atlantica;
- 335; Tramandaí - Mampituba;
- 216; Windward & Leeward Islands;
- 175; Yucatán;

=== Tropical and subtropical floodplain rivers and wetland complexes ===
- 316; Amazonas Lowlands;
- 342; Chaco;
- 307; Orinoco Llanos;
- 343; Paraguay;
- 314; Rio Negro;

=== Tropical and subtropical upland rivers ===
- 315; Amazonas Guiana Shield;
- 310; Essequibo;
- 319; Guapore - Iténez;
- 311; Guianas;
- 346; Iguassu;
- 332; Lower Uruguay;
- 321; Madeira Brazilian Shield;
- 302; Magdalena - Sinu;
- 318; Mamoré - Madre de Dios Piedmont;
- 308; Orinoco Guiana Shield;
- 325; Parnaíba;
- 327; S. Francisco;
- 320; Tapajós - Juruena;
- 324; Tocantins - Araguaia;
- 344; Upper Paraná;
- 333; Upper Uruguay;
- 174; Upper Usumacinta;
- 322; Xingu;

=== Xeric freshwaters and endorheic (closed) basins ===
- 338; Atacama;
- 336; Central Andean Pacific Slopes;
- 339; Mar Chiquita - Salinas Grandes;
- 337; Titicaca;

== Oceania ==
=== Oceanic Islands ===
- 217; Cocos Island (Costa Rica);
- 829; East Caroline Islands;
- 821; Fiji;
- 828; Hawaiian Islands;
- 826; Marquesas Islands;
- 827; Rapa;
- 823; Samoan Islands;
- 824; Society Islands;
- 825; Tubuai Islands;
- 819; Vanuatu;
- 822; Wallis - Futuna;
- 830; West Caroline Islands;

== Palearctic ==
=== Large lakes ===
- 629; Aral Sea Drainages;
- 643; Biwa Ko;
- 452; Caspian Marine;
- 606; Lake Baikal;
- 627; Lake Issyk Kul - Upper Chu;
- 409; Lake Onega - Lake Ladoga;
- 453; Volga Delta - Northern Caspian Drainages;

=== Large river deltas ===
- 524; Nile Delta;

=== Montane freshwaters ===
- 604; Chuya;
- 725; Er Hai;
- 705; Indus Himalayan Foothills;
- 633; Upper Yellow River;
- 634; Upper Yellow River Corridor;
- 706; Upper Indus;
- 704; Yaghistan;
- 762; Yunnan Lakes;

=== Polar freshwater ===
- 602; Ob;
- 610; Anadyr;
- 407; Barents Sea Drainages;
- 611; East Chukotka;
- 401; Iceland - Jan Mayen;
- 609; Kolyma;
- 608; Lena;
- 406; Northern Baltic Drainages;
- 405; Norwegian Sea Drainages;
- 607; Taimyr;
- 605; Yenisei;

=== Temperate coastal rivers ===
- 424; Aegean Drainages;
- 420; Albania;
- 501; Atlantic Northwest Africa;
- 403; Cantabric Coast - Languedoc;
- 615; Coastal Amur;
- 426; Crimea Peninsula;
- 419; Dalmatia;
- 638; Eastern Yellow Sea Drainages;
- 415; Gulf of Venice Drainages;
- 640; Hamgyong - Sanmaek;
- 642; Honshū - Shikoku - Kyūshū;
- 421; Ionian Drainages;
- 416; Italian Peninsula and Islands;
- 613; Kamchatka and Northern Kurils;
- 612; Koryakia;
- 428; Kuban;
- 502; Mediterranean Northwest Africa;
- 430; Northern Anatolia;
- 402; Northern British Isles;
- 451; Northern Hormuz Drainages;
- 614; Okhotsk Coast;
- 437; Orontes River;
- 641; Sakhalin, Hokkaido, and Sikhote-Alin Coast;
- 639; Southeastern Korean Peninsula;
- 432; Southern Anatolia;
- 408; Southern Baltic Lowlands;
- 423; Thrace;
- 422; Vardar;
- 429; Western Anatolia;
- 412; Western Iberia;
- 433; Western Transcaucasia;

=== Temperate floodplain rivers and wetlands ===
- 404; Central & Western Europe;
- 425; Dnieper - Southern Bug;
- 418; Dniester - Lower Danube;
- 427; Don;
- 414; Eastern Iberia;
- 635; Yellow River Great Bend;
- 434; Kura - South Caspian Drainages;
- 637; Liao He;
- 616; Lower Amur;
- 636; Lower Yellow River;
- 441; Lower Tigris & Euphrates;
- 766; Lower Yangtze;
- 620; Songhua Jiang;
- 413; Southern Iberia;
- 442; Upper Tigris & Euphrates;
- 410; Volga - Ural;

=== Temperate upland rivers ===
- 618; Argun;
- 626; Lower & Middle Syr Darya;
- 630; Middle Amu Darya;
- 617; Middle Amur;
- 765; Middle Yangtze;
- 628; Northern Central Asian Highlands;
- 632; Qaidan;
- 619; Shilka (Amur);
- 417; Upper Danube;
- 603; Upper Irtysh;
- 764; Upper Yangtze;

=== Tropical and subtropical upland rivers ===
- 711; Upper Brahmaputra;
- 724; Upper Lan Cang (Mekong);
- 721; Upper Salween;

=== Xeric freshwaters and endorheic (closed) basins ===
- 440; Arabian Interior;
- 624; Balkash - Alakul;
- 701; Baluchistan;
- 446; Caspian Highlands;
- 431; Central Anatolia;
- 436; Coastal Levant;
- 504; Dry Sahel;
- 623; Dzungaria;
- 449; Esfahan;
- 702; Helmand - Sistan;
- 621; Inner Mongolia Endorheic Basins;
- 601; Irgyz - Turgai;
- 438; Jordan River;
- 448; Kavir & Lut Deserts;
- 444; Lake Van;
- 523; Lower Nile;
- 447; Namak;
- 445; Orumiyeh;
- 503; Sahara;
- 435; Sinai;
- 625; Tarim;
- 707; Tibetan Plateau Endorheic Drainages;
- 450; Turan Plain;
- 631; Upper Amu Darya;
- 411; Western Caspian Drainages;
- 622; Western Mongolia;
- 527; Western Red Sea Drainages;

== See also ==
- Lists of ecoregions
- List of freshwater ecoregions in Africa and Madagascar
- List of freshwater ecoregions of Latin America and the Caribbean
