= List of ecoregions in California =

This is a list of ecoregions in California.

== Terrestrial ecoregions ==
California is in the Nearctic realm. Ecoregions are listed by biome:

=== Temperate coniferous forests ===
- Eastern Cascades forests (Eastern Cascades Slopes and Foothills)
- Great Basin montane forests
- Klamath–Siskiyou forests (Klamath Mountains)
- Northern California coastal forests
- Sierra Nevada forests

=== Temperate grasslands, savannas, and shrublands ===
- California Central Valley grasslands

=== Mediterranean forests, woodlands, and shrub ===
- California coastal sage and chaparral
- California interior chaparral and woodlands
- California montane chaparral and woodlands

=== Deserts and xeric shrublands ===
- Great Basin shrub steppe
- Mojave Desert
- Snake–Columbia shrub steppe
- Sonoran Desert

== Freshwater ecoregions ==
- Colorado
- Death Valley
- Lahontan
- Oregon Lakes
- Oregon & Northern California Coastal
- Southern California Coastal–Baja California
- Sacramento–San Joaquin

== Marine ecoregions ==
- Northern California
- Southern California Bight
