= Intermountain West =

Geographic region of the Western United States

Coordinates: 40°N 115°W

- Geographic and geological region of the United States
- Map of the Intermountain West by county. Counties in red are always included, while counties in pink are only sometimes included.
- Country: United States
- States: Arizona; California; Colorado; Idaho; Montana; Nevada; New Mexico; Oregon; Texas; Utah; Washington; Wyoming

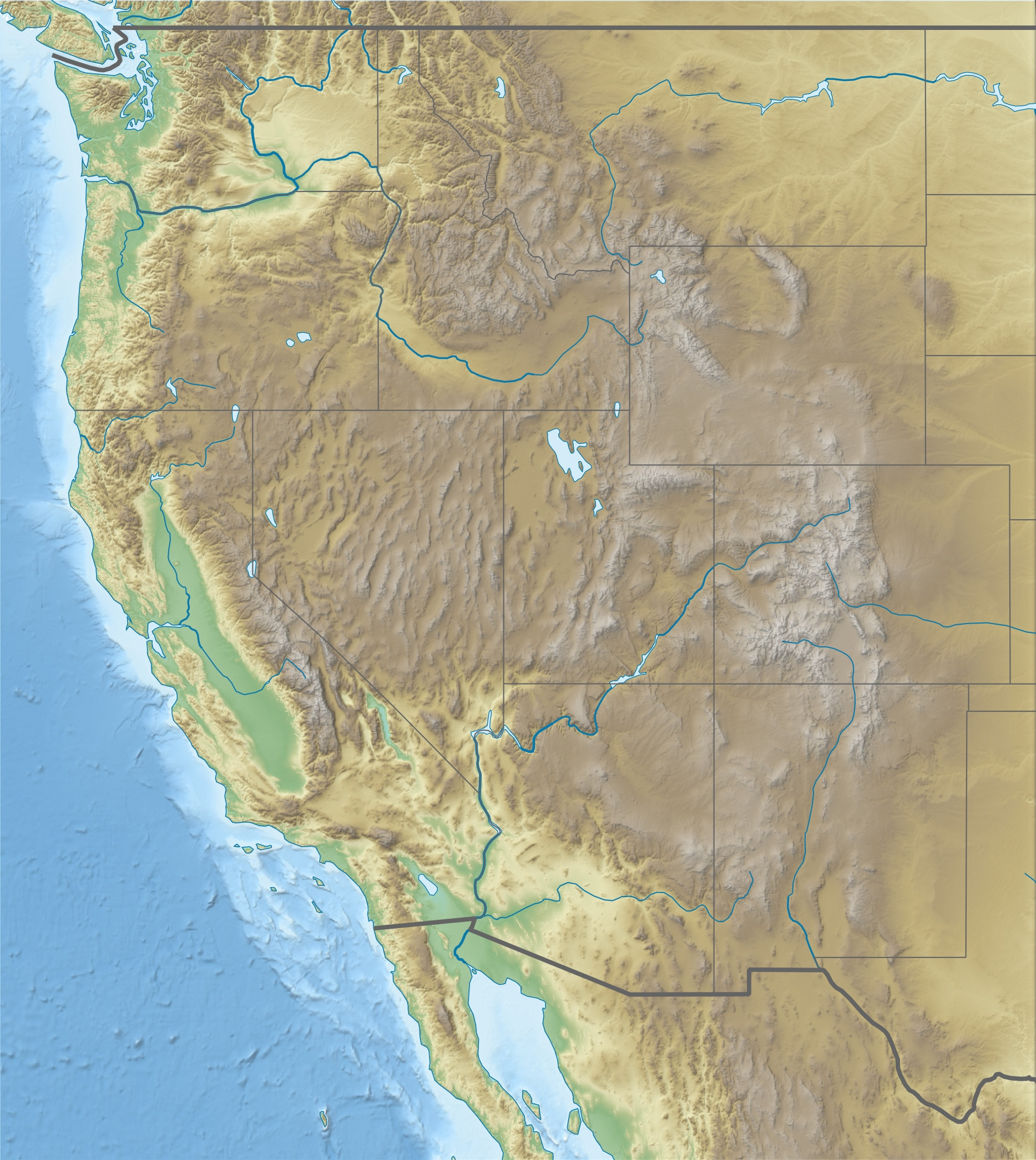
General location of the Intermountain West in the Western United States

The Intermountain West, or Intermountain Region, is a geographic and geological region of the Western United States. It is located between the Rocky Mountain Front on the east and the Cascade Range and Sierra Nevada on the west.

== Topography ==
The Intermountain West has a basin and range and plateau topography. Some of the region's rivers reach the Pacific Ocean, such as the Columbia River and Colorado River. Other regional rivers and streams are in endorheic basins and cannot reach the sea, such as the Walker River and Owens River. These flow into brackish or seasonally dry lakes or desert sinks.
Portions of this region include:

- Basin and Range Province
- Colorado Plateau
- Great Basin
- Intermontane Plateaus

== Climate ==
The climate of the Intermountain Region is affected by location and elevation. The sub-regions are in rain shadows from the Cascade or Sierra Nevada ranges that block precipitation from Pacific storms. The winter weather depends on latitude. In the southern portion, winters are shorter, warmer and have less winter precipitation and snow. In the northern portion, winters are cold and moist. All areas have hot summers. North American Monsoon storms can occur in the region during the mid-summer, coming northeast from the Pacific Ocean and Mexican Plateau.

== Natural history ==
The flora at lower elevations includes deserts and xeric shrublands and temperate grasslands and shrublands biome vegetation. Higher elevation montane habitats include temperate coniferous forests biome vegetation, including groves and forests of various species of pine, cedar, juniper, aspen, and other trees, and understory shrubs, and perennials.
Intermountain West ecoregions include:

- Cascade Mountains leeward forests - Temperate coniferous forest biome (WWF)
- Eastern Cascades Slopes and Foothills (ecoregion) – Northwestern Forested Mountains; Level III ecoregion (EPA)
- Columbia Plateau (ecoregion) – Temperate grasslands, savannas, and shrublands biome (WWF)
- Palouse grasslands ecoregion – Temperate grasslands, savannas, and shrublands biome (WWF)
- North Central Rockies forests - Temperate coniferous forest biome (WWF)
- South Central Rockies forests - Temperate coniferous forest biome (WWF)
- Snake River Plain (ecoregion) – North American Deserts; Level III ecoregion (EPA)
- Montana Valley and Foothill grasslands - Temperate grasslands, savannas, and shrublands biome (WWF)
- Wyoming Basin shrub steppe - Deserts and xeric shrublands biome (WWF)
- Central Basin and Range ecoregion – North American Deserts; Level III ecoregion (EPA)
- Great Basin shrub steppe – Deserts and xeric shrublands biome (WWF)
- Great Basin montane forests – Temperate coniferous forest biome (WWF)
- Northern Basin and Range ecoregion – North American Deserts; Level III ecoregion (EPA)
- Wasatch and Uinta montane forests ecoregion – Temperate coniferous forest biome (WWF)
- Colorado Rockies forests - Temperate coniferous forest biome (WWF)
- Colorado Plateau Shrublands - Deserts and xeric shrublands biome (WWF)
- Arizona Mountains forests - Temperate coniferous forest biome (WWF)

Some sections are agriculturally cultivated with water diversions for irrigation systems. Cattle ranching is practiced in the region as well. Cultivated crops include corn, potatoes, sugar beets, grass hay, and alfalfa, the latter two crops are used for livestock feed.

== Demographics and sociology ==
For thousands of years the Intermountain West has been the homeland for many Native American cultures, tribes, and bands. The 18th-century fur trade (northern areas), and 19th-century westward expansion of the United States brought irreversible cultural changes. The completion of the first transcontinental railroad through the region accelerated non-native settlements and development.

Historically, the Intermountain West area centered in Utah is associated with Latter-day Saint (Mormon) settlements, and the region has the highest percentage of LDS members in the United States. That region is also known as the Mormon Corridor.

== Intermountain states ==
The intermountain states are generally considered to be Nevada, Utah, Idaho, the western third of Montana, Arizona north of the Mogollon Rim, Colorado from the Front Range westward, New Mexico from the central mountain chain westward, California east of the Sierra Nevada Mountains, Oregon and Washington east of the Cascade Mountains, and Far West Texas from the Pecos River westward. The intermountain states are so named from having all or portions between the Rockies, Sierras, and Cascades. The intermountain states are included among states classified as the Mountain States.

== See also ==
- Western United States
- Index: Regions of the Western United States
