= Shrub–steppe =

Arid grassland

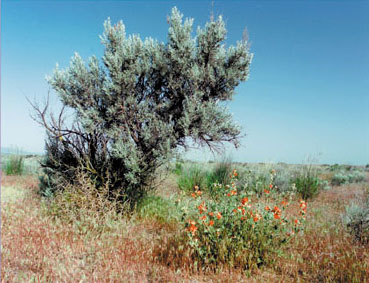
Sagebrush

Shrub-steppe is a type of low-rainfall natural grassland. While arid, shrub-steppes have sufficient moisture to support a cover of perennial grasses or shrubs, a feature which distinguishes them from deserts.

The primary ecological processes historically at work in shrub-steppe ecosystems are drought and fire. Shrub-steppe plant species have developed particular adaptations to low annual precipitation and summer drought conditions. Plant adaptations to different soil moisture regimes influence their distribution. A frequent fire regime in the shrub-steppe similarly adds to the patchwork pattern of shrub and grass that characterizes shrub-steppe ecosystems.

== North America ==
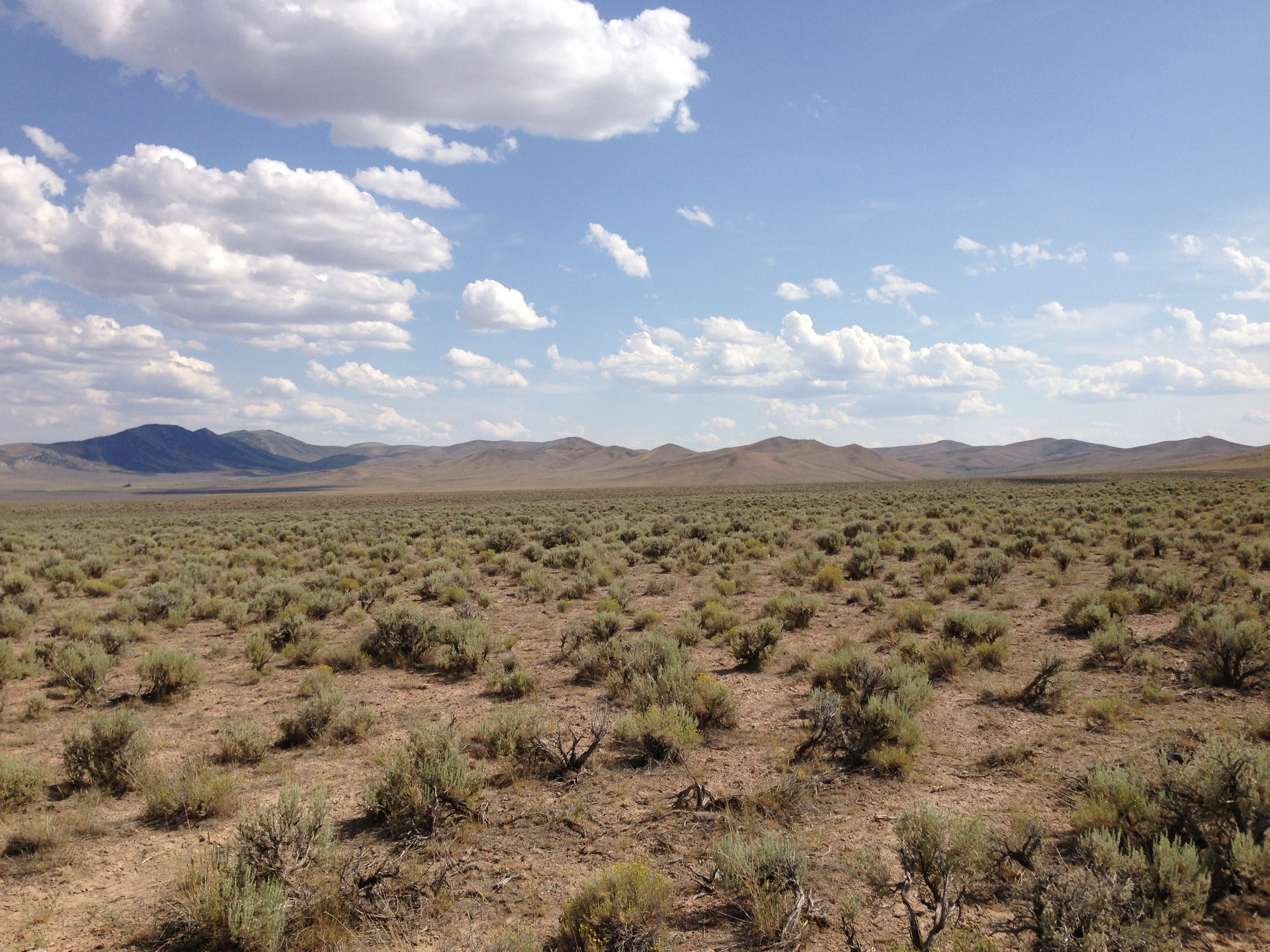
Sagebrush steppe in northeastern Nevada along US 93

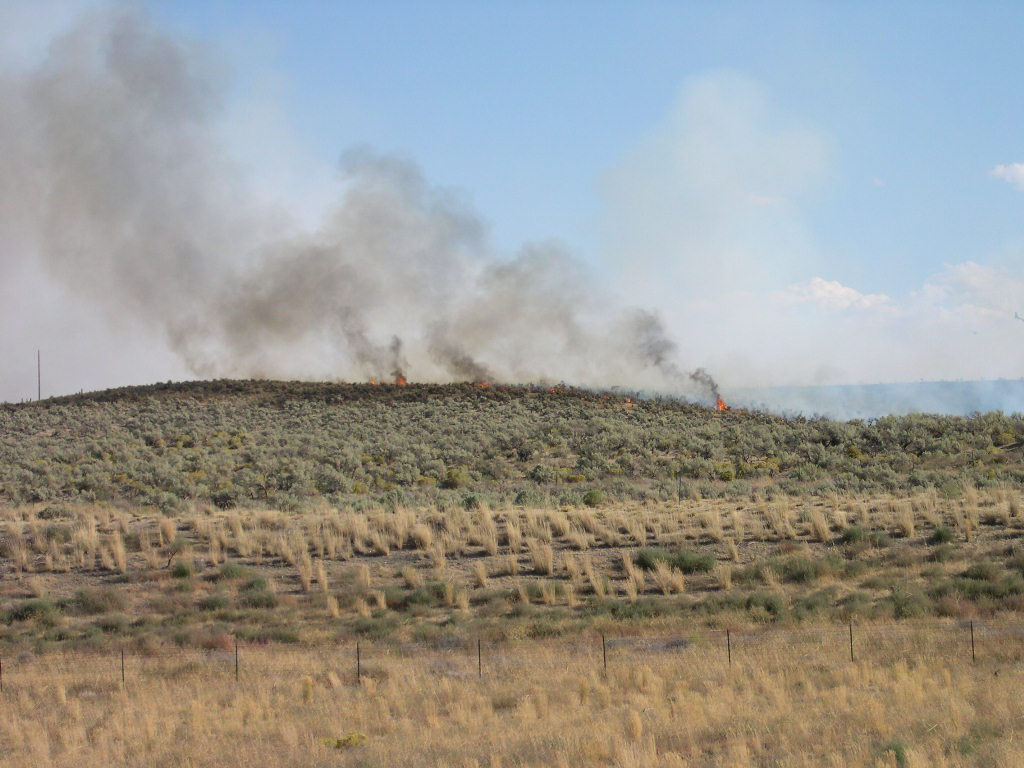
Shrub-steppe, one of the United States' most endangered ecosystems, on fire. Artemisia tridentata ssp. wyomingensis, unlike ponderosa pine, is not adapted to fire and is in most cases completely destroyed.

The shrub-steppes of North America occur in the western United States and western Canada, in the rain shadow between the Cascades and Sierra Nevada on the west and the Rocky Mountains on the east. They extend from south-central British Columbia down into south central and south-eastern Washington, eastern Oregon, and eastern California, and across through Idaho, Nevada, and Utah into western Wyoming and Colorado, and down into northern and central New Mexico and northern Arizona. Growth is dominated primarily by low-lying shrubs, such as big sagebrush (Artemisia tridentata) and bitterbrush (Purshia tridentata), with too little rainfall to support the growth of forests, though some trees do occur. Other important plants are bunchgrasses such as Pseudoroegneria spicata, which have historically provided forage for livestock as well as wildlife, but are quickly being replaced by nonnative annual species like cheatgrass (Bromus tectorum), tumble mustard (Sisymbrium altissimum), and Russian thistle (Salsola kali). There is also a suite of animals that call the shrub-steppe home, including sage grouse, pygmy rabbit, Western rattlesnake, and pronghorn.

Historically, much of the shrub-steppe in Washington state was referred to as scabland because of the deep channels cut into pure basalt rock by cataclysmic floods more than 10,000 years ago. Major threats to the ecosystem include overgrazing, fires, invasion by nonnative species, development (since much of it is at lower elevations), conversion to cropland, and energy development. Less than 50% of the state of Washington's historic shrub-steppe remains; according to some estimates, only 12 to 15% remains.

Shrub-steppe ecoregions of North America include:

- Great Basin shrub steppe in eastern California, central Nevada, western Utah, and southeastern Idaho.
- Snake–Columbia shrub steppe in south-central Washington state, eastern Oregon, northeastern California, northern Nevada, and southern Idaho.
- Wyoming Basin shrub steppe in central Wyoming, reaching into south-central Montana, northeastern Utah, southeastern Idaho, and northwestern Colorado.
- Okanagan shrub steppe in the Okanagan Valley in south-central British Columbia, and the southern Similkameen Valley in south-central British Columbia and north-central Washington state.

The South Central Rockies forests, Montana valley and foothill grasslands, and Blue Mountains forests also contain shrub-steppes.

== See also ==
- Arid Lands Ecology Reserve (in Washington state in the US)
- Artemisia tridentata
- Deserts and xeric shrublands
- Rangeland
- Steppe
- Temperate grasslands, savannas, and shrublands
