= Western Home Journal =

Newspaper published in Lawrence, Kansas

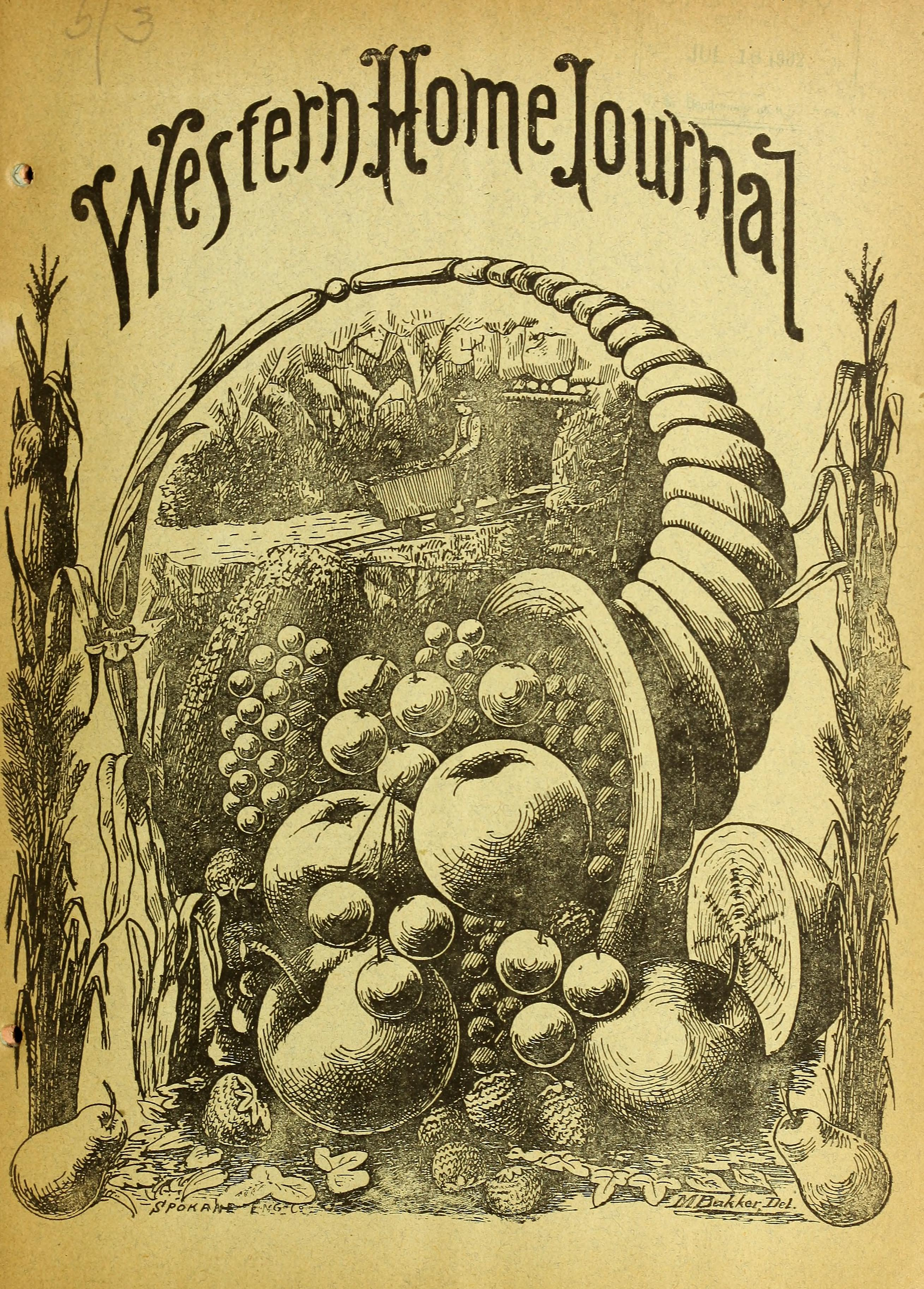
Western Home Journal and the Inter-mountain Poultry Journal (1900)

Western Home Journal was a 19th-century weekly newspaper and a 20th-century Western Home Journal and the Inter-mountain Poultry Journal. It is now a "luxury mountain home sourcebook for building or remodeling" homes in the Intermountain West of the Western United States.

== Historical newspaper ==
It was a newspaper published from 1857 in Kansas or 1869 in Ottawa, Kansas to 1885 in Lawrence, Kansas. It was operated from 1869 to 1885 by I.S. Kalloch, T.D. Thacher, and M.W. Reynolds.

It was called or related to:

- Lawrence Republican (Lawrence, Kansas) 1857 to 1869
- The Kansas State Journal (Lawrence, Kansas) 1861 to 1869
- The Daily Kansas State Journal (Lawrence, Kan.) 1865 to 1869
- Western Home Journal (Ottawa, Kansas) 1865 to 1869
- The Republican Daily Journal (Lawrence, Kansas) 1869 to 1875
- The Republican Daily Journal and Daily Kansas Tribune (Lawrence, Kansas) 1875 to 1879
- The Lawrence Journal (Lawrence, Kansas) 1883 to 1885

There are 6,226 searchable pages at kansashistoricalcontent.newspapers.com.

By 1900, it was published in Spokane, Washington as the Western Home Journal and the Inter-mountain Poultry Journal.
