= Montana valley and foothill grasslands =

Ecoregion of Canada and the United States

Coordinates: 45°31′N 112°21′W

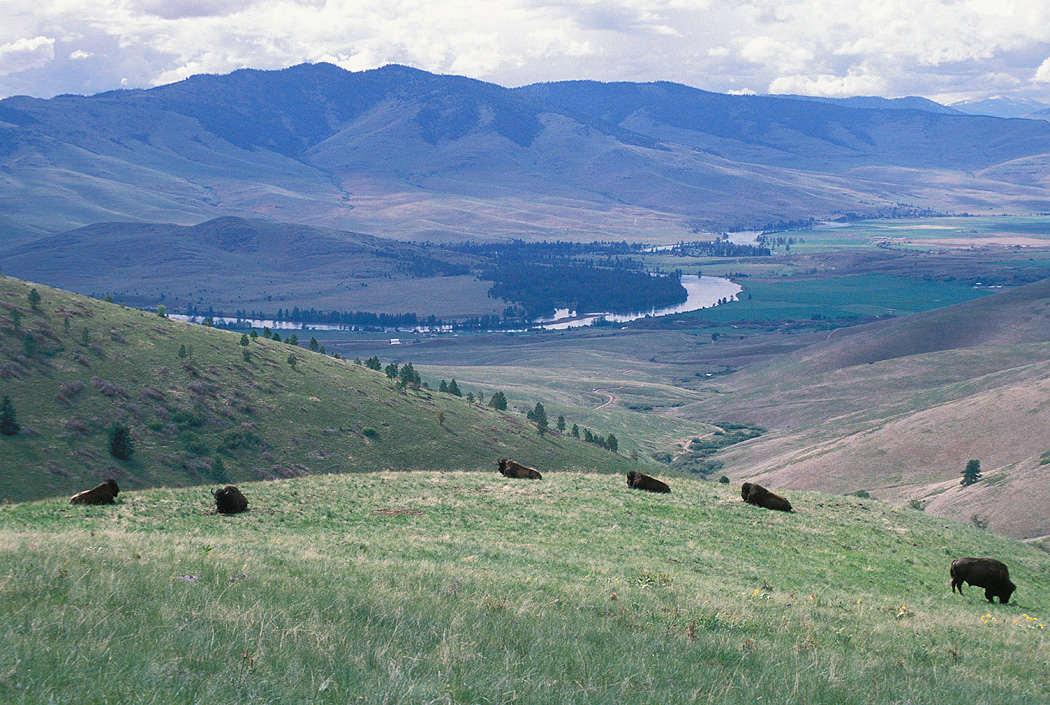
- Bison at the CSKT Bison Range

Ecology
- Realm: Nearctic
- Biome: temperate grasslands, savannas, and shrublands
- Borders: List: Canadian aspen forests and parklands; North Central Rockies forests; Northern short grasslands; South Central Rockies forests; Wyoming Basin shrub steppe
- Bird species: 214
- Mammal species: 88

Geography
- Area: 31,500 km^{2} (12,200 mi^{2})
- Countries: United States; Canada
- States: Montana; Alberta

Conservation
- Habitat loss: 26.375%
- Protected: 26.85%

The Montana valley and foothill grasslands are an ecoregion of northwestern North America in the northern United States and southern Canada.

== Setting ==
This area consists of rolling grassy hills and river valleys of the Rocky Mountains foothills in the US state of Montana and the Canadian province of Alberta. The area largely consists of the Rocky Mountain Front, where the Great Plains rise to meet the Rockies, and is thus near the Continental Divide. The foothills are drained by the upper Missouri River and the Clark Fork/Bitterroot River systems among others. The ecoregion also contains outlying disconnected areas of similar habitat such as valleys of the Bow River in Alberta. The area has a moderate climate, warmed by the Chinook wind which brings dry, warm summers (average 14 °C) and winters that are mild for this latitude (ave. -8 °C).

== Flora ==
While the dominant vegetation are grasses such as rough fescue with Parry's oatgrass and Koeleria (June grasses) the foothills are rich in plant life with, for example, 487 species of plant counted in southwest Montana's Centennial Valley. The ecoregion also contains sagebrush country in the higher and drier valleys in the rain shadow of the Rockies such as the upper Madison, Ruby and Red Rock Rivers, which are a similar habitat to the neighbouring Snake-Columbia shrub steppe ecoregion. Finally the ecoregion contains parts of the Prairie Pothole Region, large areas of wetland and rich grass on the Rocky Mountain Front steppe. Traditionally the grassland was reduced and then renewed by a combination of heavy grazing by bison and other ungulates and regular fires.

== Fauna ==
The traditional wildlife of this area of included the large herds American bison, elk and bighorn sheep observed during the Lewis and Clark Expedition in the early 19th century but which now remain in small numbers only. Another iconic mammal found here are the grizzly bears, which come down from the mountainsides to forage in the rich habitats of rivers and grasslands. This is the last remaining area in the United States where grizzlies come down to the Great Plains. Other mammals of the valleys include white-tailed deer, wolves, mountain lions, mule deer, pronghorn and ground squirrels. Birds spotted in the Centennial Valley for example include grouse, sandhill crane and trumpeter swan.

== Threats and preservation ==
About 25% of the original grassland remains (less than 10% in Canada) and continues to decrease due to the rapid growth of the Rockies' population. Expansion of cities in both Montana and Alberta is removing habitat and blocking the movements of native species including grizzly bears, elk, mule deer and others. Growth is most intense in southwestern Montana, specifically in the Bitterroot Valley around Missoula and the area just north of Yellowstone National Park along the Gallatin River, namely in Bozeman and the resort town of Big Sky, and the Yellowstone River in Paradise Valley.

The area contains the largest and most expensive Superfund toxic waste site in the United States. The Clark Fork River Superfund Complex consists of three major sites along a 120-mile (190 km) stretch of the Clark Fork River. It includes the Berkeley Pit, a former copper mine one mile (1.6 km) across that now holds heavily acidic (pH = 2.5) water 900 feet (270 m) in depth.

Areas of relatively intact grassland and wetland on the Rocky Mountain Front include the Pine Butte Swamp Preserve near Choteau, Montana, parts of the Blackfeet Indian Reservation, and a number of other hills and valleys of southwestern Montana including the Centennial Mountains, the Big Hole River and parts of the Madison River valleys. Protected areas include Red Rock Lakes National Wildlife Refuge in Centennial Valley, Pine Butte Swamp, the CSKT Bison Range in western Montana and a number of Bureau of Land Management wilderness study areas.

== See also ==
- List of ecoregions in Canada (WWF)
- List of ecoregions in the United States (WWF)
