= South Central Rockies forests =

Temperate coniferous forests ecoregion of the United States

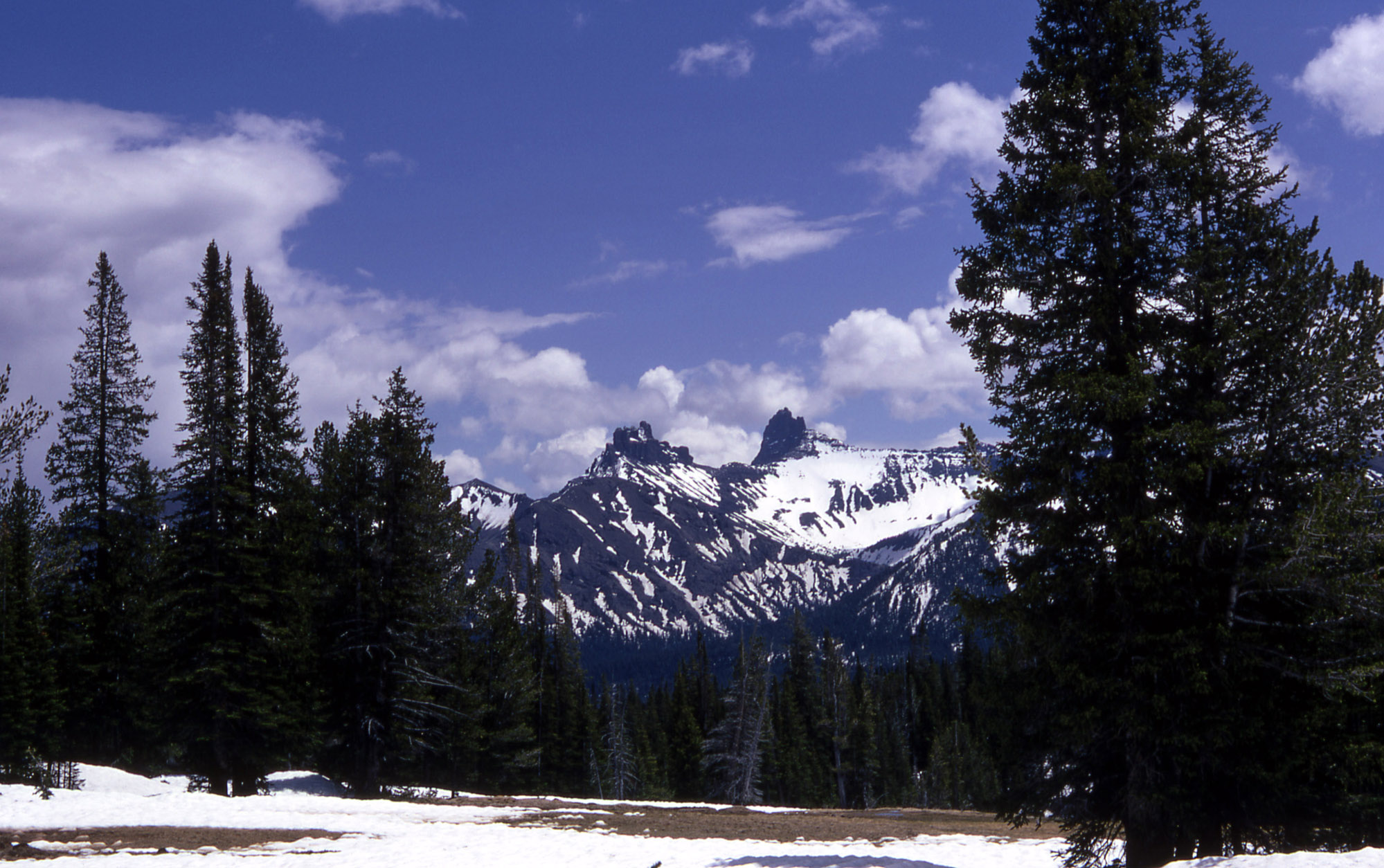
- Subalpine forest in Shoshone National Forest, Wyoming

Ecology
- Realm: Nearctic
- Biome: Temperate coniferous forest
- Borders: List: Blue Mountains forests; Great Basin shrub steppe; Montana Valley and Foothill grasslands; North Central Rockies forests; Northern short grasslands; Palouse grasslands; Snake-Columbia shrub steppe; Wyoming Basin shrub steppe; Wasatch and Uinta montane forests
- Bird species: 201
- Mammal species: 99

Geography
- Country: United States
- States: Montana; Idaho; Wyoming; South Dakota
- Coordinates: 44°N 110°W

Conservation
- Habitat loss: 1.6644%
- Protected: 82.66%

The South Central Rockies forests is a temperate coniferous forest ecoregion of the United States located mainly in Wyoming, Idaho, and Montana. It has a considerably drier climate than the North Central Rockies forest.

== Setting ==
This ecoregion is located in eastern and central Idaho, southwestern and south-central Montana, western and northeastern Wyoming, and southwestern South Dakota. It is centered on the Yellowstone Plateau, extending outward on connected mountain ranges, but the ecoregion also includes the isolated Bighorn Mountains and Black Hills, as well as smaller isolated ranges in central Montana. The area has a dry continental climate, with brief summers and long, cold winters.

== Flora ==
The ecoregion is predominantly coniferous forest, dominated by lodgepole pine (Pinus contorta latifolia) due to relatively recent major fires in the area. Other trees include Engelmann spruce (Picea engelmanni), Rocky Mountain Douglas-fir (Pseudotsuga menziesii glauca), Ponderosa pine (Pinus ponderosa), subalpine fir (Abies lasiocarpa) and trembling aspen (Populus tremuloides). Whitebark pine (Pinus albicaulis) is an important species at the upper tree line/krummholz zone.

In addition, this ecoregion contains foothill grasslands and shrub steppes dominated by big sagebrush (Artemisia tridentata), similar to the surrounding Montana valley and foothill grasslands, Wyoming Basin shrub steppe, and Snake–Columbia shrub steppe. There also are mountain meadows, riparian woodlands, and alpine tundra. In some areas, geothermal activity creates distinct, warm habitats with unique floral communities.

== Fauna ==
Mammals of this ecoregion include elk (Cervus canadensis), mule deer (Odocoileus hemionus), bighorn sheep (Ovis canadensis), plains bison (Bison bison bison), Shiras moose (Alces alces shirasi), cougar (Puma concolor), grizzly bear (Ursus arctos horribilis), northwestern wolf (Canis lupus occidentalis), black bear (Ursus americanus), bobcat (Lynx rufus) and Canada lynx (Lynx canadensis), coyote (Canis latrans), North American beaver (Castor canadensis), North American river otter (Lontra canadensis), and snowshoe hare (Lepus americanus).

Birds are typical of the forested portions of the northern Rocky Mountains, including Steller's jay, black-capped chickadee, and pine siskin. This ecoregion boasts a very rich avifauna, including such specialists as white pelican, trumpeter swan, and (black) rosy finch. Other typical species include harlequin duck, Barrow's goldeneye, Swainson's hawk, bald eagle, osprey, sage grouse, sandhill crane, Franklin's gull, American dipper, Townsend's solitaire, yellow-rumped warbler, and Brewer's sparrow. Herpetofauna typical of this ecoregion are the spotted frog, prairie rattlesnake, rubber boa, boreal toad, and blotched tiger salamander.

== Conservation status and protected areas ==
Though large portions of this ecoregion are protected, its conservation status is listed as "vulnerable". Indiscriminate logging of unprotected areas and the deaths of grizzly bears and possibly wolves by ungulate hunters are the main threats to this ecoregion's integrity. Protected areas include Yellowstone National Park in northwestern Wyoming, south-central Montana and eastern Idaho, Grand Teton National Park in western Wyoming, Cloud Peak Wilderness in north-central Wyoming, and Black Elk Wilderness in southwestern South Dakota.

== See also ==
- Greater Yellowstone Ecosystem
- List of ecoregions in the United States (WWF)
