= Fire–vegetation feedbacks and alternative stable states =

The relationships between fire, vegetation, and climate create what is known as a fire regime. Within a fire regime, fire ecologists study the relationship between diverse ecosystems and fire; not only how fire affects vegetation, but also how vegetation affects the behavior of fire. The study of neighboring vegetation types that may be highly flammable and less flammable has provided insight into how these vegetation types can exist side by side, and are maintained by the presence or absence of fire events. Ecologists have studied these boundaries between different vegetation types, such as a closed canopy forest and a grassland, and hypothesized about how climate and soil fertility create these boundaries in vegetation types. Research in the field of pyrogeography shows how fire also plays an important role in the maintenance of dominant vegetation types, and how different vegetation types with distinct relationships to fire can exist side by side in the same climate conditions. These relationships can be described in conceptual models called fire–vegetation feedbacks, and alternative stable states.

== Fire–vegetation feedbacks ==
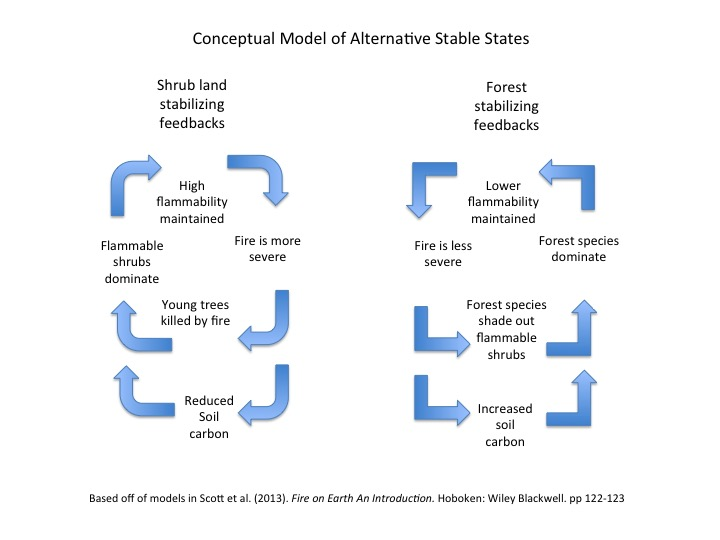
Conceptual model of fire–vegetation feedbacks and alternative stable states

Vegetation can be understood as highly flammable (pyrophilic) and less flammable (pyrophobic). A fire–vegetation feedback describes the relationship between fire and the dominant vegetation type. An example of a highly flammable vegetation type is a grassland. Frequent fire will maintain grassland as the dominant vegetation in a positive feedback loop. This happens because frequent fire will kill trees trying to establish in the area, yet the intervals between each fire will allow for new grasses to establish, grow into fuel, and burn again. Therefore, frequent fire on a grassland area will maintain grass as the dominant vegetation and not permit the encroachment of trees. In contrast, fire will occur less frequently and less severely in closed canopy forests because the fuels are more dense, shaded, and therefore more humid thereby not igniting as easily. The closed canopy of the dominant forest vegetation will also limit the growth of certain species, and permit the growth of shade-tolerant plants.

== Alternative stable states and fire ==
The ecological theory of alternative stable states describes how different ecosystems can exist side by side, and how they can shift as a result of disturbance. Applied to fire ecology, the theory describes how flammable and less-flammable vegetation types can exist side by side, and are maintained by different relationships with fire. If the frequency and intensity of fire in each vegetation type is not disturbed, then the dominant vegetation type will be maintained, and considered stable. This theory also describes how dominant vegetation can rapidly shift to another vegetation type via fire suppression, an increase in fire severity, introduction of invasive species, and other management disturbances. These effects, which can cause a vegetation type to shift, are described as destabilizing transitions.

The theory of fire and alternative stable states has been researched in many places across the globe in recent decades. The study of fire regimes and alternative stable states requires inquiry on many levels; paleoecological research into vegetation patterns, evidence of fire, and climate over millennia; research on anthropogenic burning; and research on the impacts of management such as fire suppression, grazing, and forestry.

== Alternative stable states and fire across the globe ==
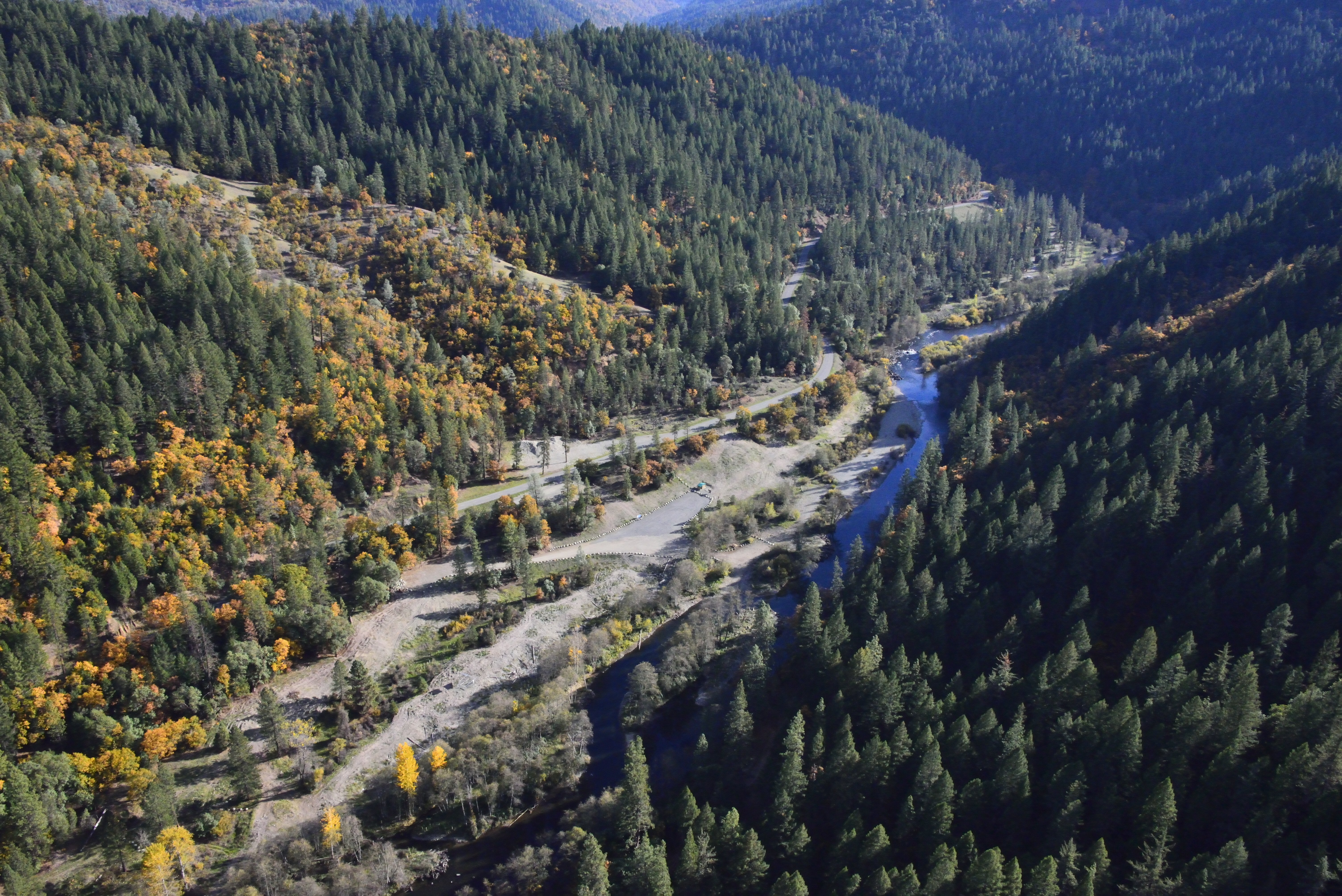
Mixed conifer forest near Klamath National Forest

=== Klamath Mountains ===
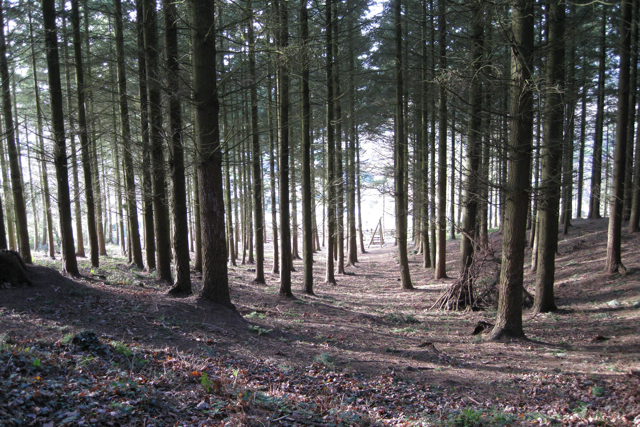
Douglas fir plantation example

An example of alternative stable states and fire can be found in the Klamath Mountains, in northwestern California. The fire regime of this area before European settlement burned in intervals of 5–75 years, and Native Americans, including the Karuk Tribe, used, and continue to use, fire to manage the landscapes. Three dominant vegetation types are common and neighboring in this region; sclerophyll shrub land, conifer forests, and plantation conifer forests. Sclerophyllous vegetation is medium to tall shrubs and trees, and are considered pyrogenic and recover quickly after fire due to a number of fire adaptations, such as re-sprouting lignotubers and seeds that survive fire. Closed conifer forests contain a medium to tall overstory of conifers and a shade-tolerant understory. Conifer-dominated forests burn less frequently, and can have low to high severity fire events. High severity events can be stand-replacing events that kill all dominant vegetation. Plantations in this area grow the commercially valuable Douglas fir, are densely and uniformly spaced, do not usually have hardwoods, and have grass and shrubs in the understory. These plantations are more flammable than neighboring mixed conifer forests.

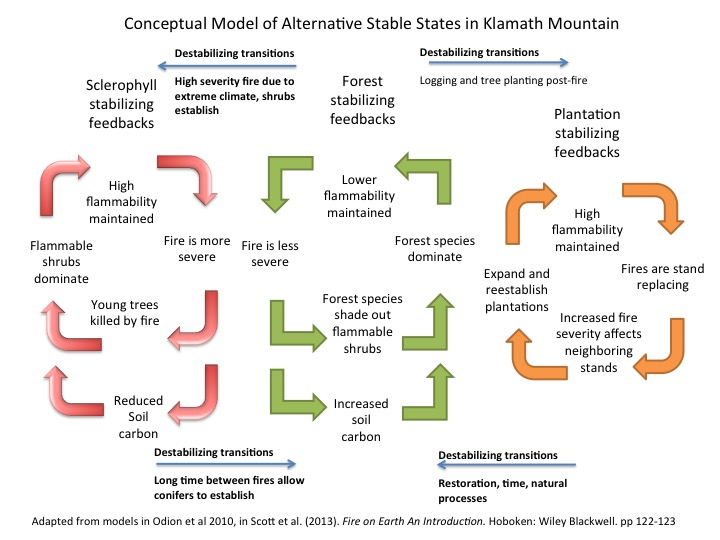
Conceptual model of alternative stable states in Klamath Mountains, after Odion et al., 2010

When patches of mixed conifer forest are killed by high severity fire events, sclerophyll vegetation can establish first and create a new alternative stable state with its own self-reinforcing feedback with fire. Therefore, a high severity fire event is considered a destabilizing transition between mixed conifer forest and a sclerophyll shrub land. Conversely, if a long period of time between fires occurs in sclerophyll vegetation, conifers can establish and the state can switch to a less flammable mixed conifer forest, which will be maintained by lower severity and less frequent fires. Therefore, fire suppression in a sclerophyll shrub land is considered a destabilizing transition, as it causes the fire dependent sclerophyll shrub land to switch to a mixed conifer forest. The establishment of a conifer plantation creates an alternative stable state that has higher pyrogenicity than a mixed confer forest, creating the potential for more frequent and higher severity fire that can affect neighboring mixed conifer forests. The establishment of a conifer plantation in a previous sclerophyll shrubland or mixed conifer forest and the related effects of increased fire severity also create destabilizing transitions in this alternative stable states model.

=== Tasmania ===
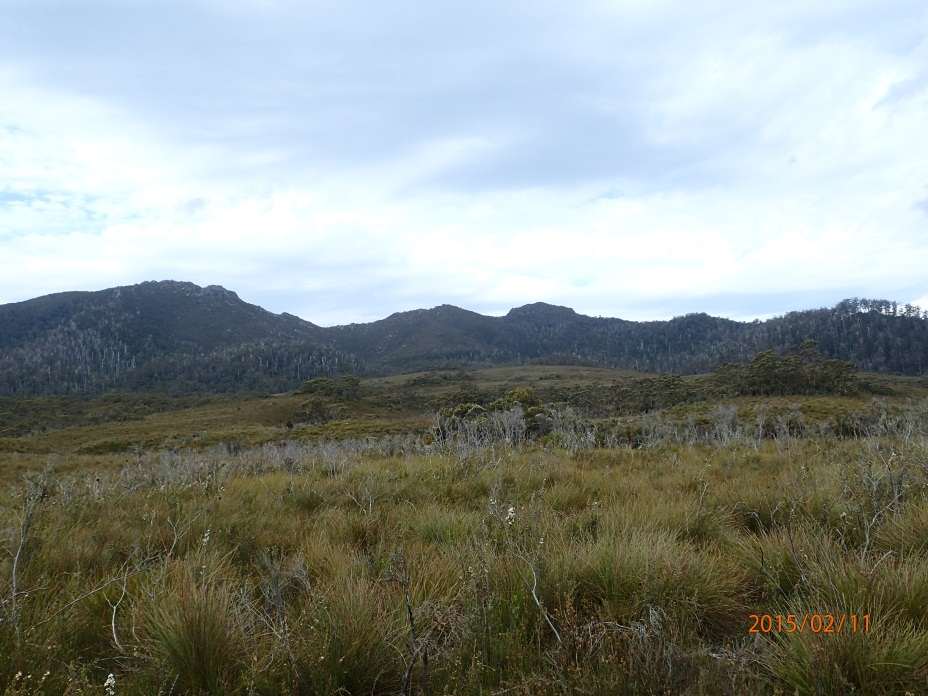
Moorland in southwest Tasmania

Recent studies of alternative stable states in southwestern Tasmania include the role of soil fertility and topography in relationship to fire, vegetation, and reinforcing feedbacks. Four vegetation types exist in the studied area of southwestern Tasmania; moorland, shrubland, wet sclerophyll, and rainforest. Patches of rainforest are surrounded by a patchwork of more flammable vegetation types. Rainforests were found to be located in valleys and south-facing slopes, areas which were found to be less likely to burn. Both topography and fire play a role in maintaining these alternative stable states. Soil nutrients were reduced in areas of higher flammability, and were found to accumulate in the forested areas that burnt less frequently.

== Management implications ==
As demonstrated by alternative stable states theories and research, fire exclusion and other management practices impact neighboring vegetation types via destabilizing transitions. Land managers and the public will need to consider the destabilizing effects of management practices such as prolonged fire suppression, and plantation establishment after fires, on neighboring fire dependent ecosystems.
