= Oregon & Northern California Coastal =

Freshwater ecoregion in Oregon and California

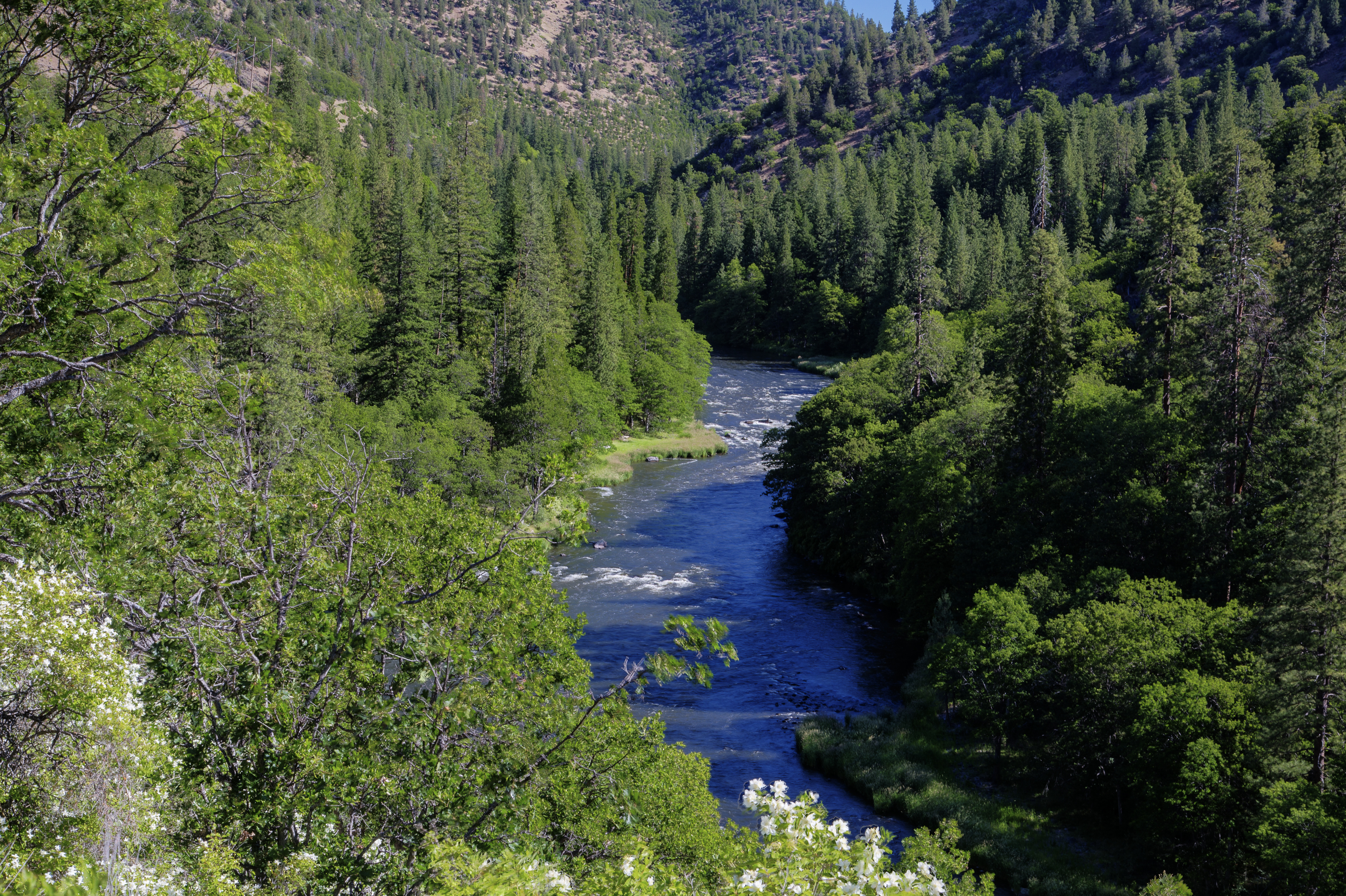
The Klamath River

Oregon & Northern California Coastal is a freshwater ecoregion in western North America. It includes the coastal rivers of Oregon and Northern California, from the Columbia River mouth in northwestern Oregon to northern Monterey Bay in Central California. It includes the Umpqua, Rogue, Smith River, Klamath, Mad, Eel, and lower Russian rivers, and many smaller coastal rivers and streams, including those on the coast side of the Marin and San Francisco peninsulas.

== Geography ==
The ecoregion has an area of 105,520 square kilometres (40,740 mi^{2}). 55% of the ecoregion is in Oregon, and the remaining 45% in California.

The ecoregion is generally west of the crest of the Oregon Coast Range and northern California Coast Ranges. The upper Klamath River lies east of the Coast Ranges, draining part of the plateau country between the Coast Ranges and the Cascade Range.

The predominant vegetation is temperate coniferous forest. It overlaps portions of the Northern California coastal forests, Klamath–Siskiyou forests, and Central Pacific coastal forests terrestrial ecoregions.

It is bounded on the west by the Pacific Ocean. The Columbia River basin lies to the northeast, and includes Oregon's Willamette River on the eastern side of the Oregon Coast Range. The upper Klamath basin borders on the Oregon Lakes ecoregion to the east. To the southeast the Sacramento–San Joaquin freshwater ecoregion includes the Sacramento River basin on the eastern side of the California Coast Ranges, as well as the rivers and streams that empty into San Francisco Bay.

== Fauna ==
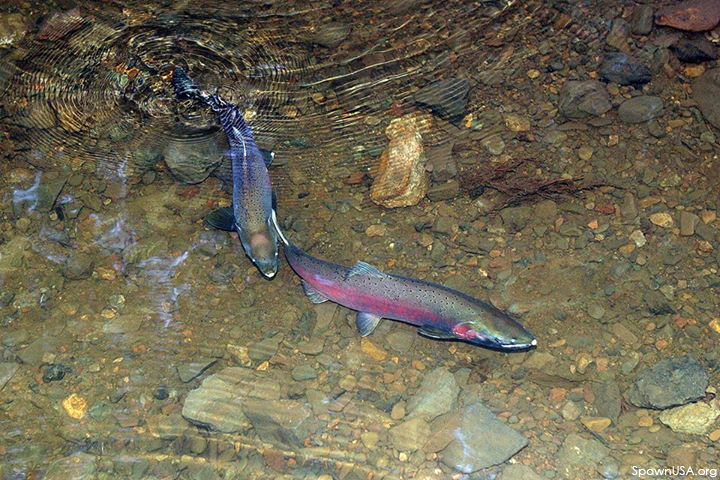
Coho salmon (Oncorhynchus kisutch) in Lagunitas Creek in Marin County, California.

About a quarter of fish species are endemic to the ecoregion, including the Umpqua pikeminnow (Ptychocheilus umpquae), Klamath smallscale sucker (Catostomus rimiculus), Klamath largescale sucker (C. snyderi), Klamath Lake sculpin (Cottus princeps), slender sculpin (Cottus tenuis), Modoc brook lamprey (Entosphenus folletti), Klamath River lamprey (Entosphenus similis), Miller Lake lamprey (Entosphenus minima), shortnose sucker (Chasmistes brevirostris), Lost River sucker (Deltistes luxatus), blue chub (Gila coerulea), Umpqua chub (Oregonichthys kalawatseti), and Umpqua dace (Rhinichthys evermanni).

The rivers and creeks of the ecoregion are home to several species of anadromous Pacific salmon and trout (genus Oncorhynchus), including pink salmon (Oncorhynchus gorbuscha), coho salmon (Oncorhynchus kisutch), king salmon or chinook salmon (Oncorhynchus tshawytscha), steelhead (Oncorhynchus mykiss irideus), and coastal cutthroat trout (Oncorhynchus clarkii clarkii).

Other native fishes include the white sturgeon (Acipenser transmontanus) and northern tidewater goby (Eucyclogobius newberryi).

Other native animals include the California red-legged frog (Rana draytonii), foothill yellow-legged frog (Rana boylii), and western pond turtle (Actinemys marmorata).

== Protected areas ==
Ramsar sites in the ecoregion include Tomales Bay and Bolinas Lagoon in California.
