= Wasatch and Uinta montane forests =

Temperate coniferous forests ecoregion of the United States

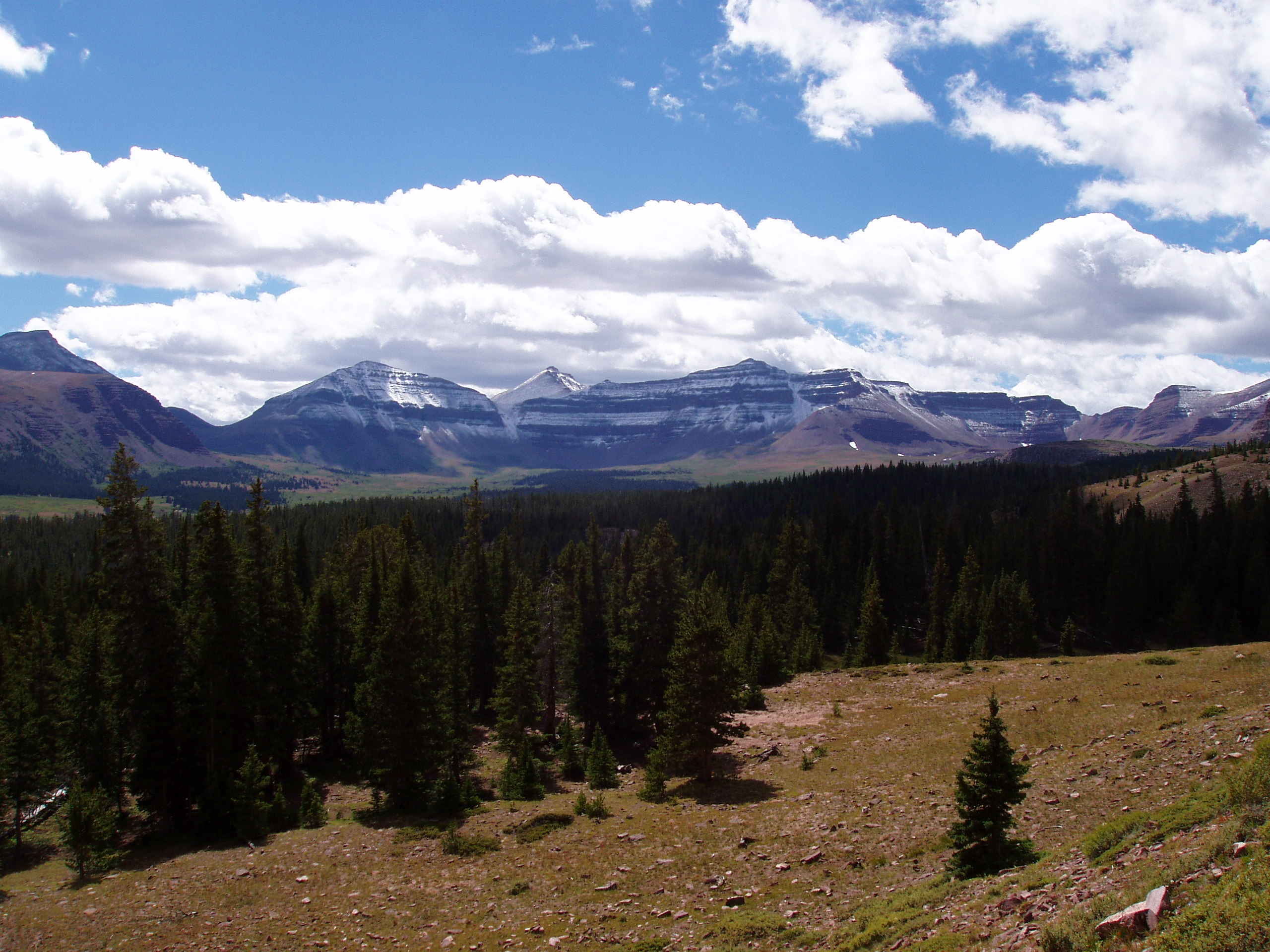
- Coniferous forest with Kings Peak in the background, Uinta Mountains

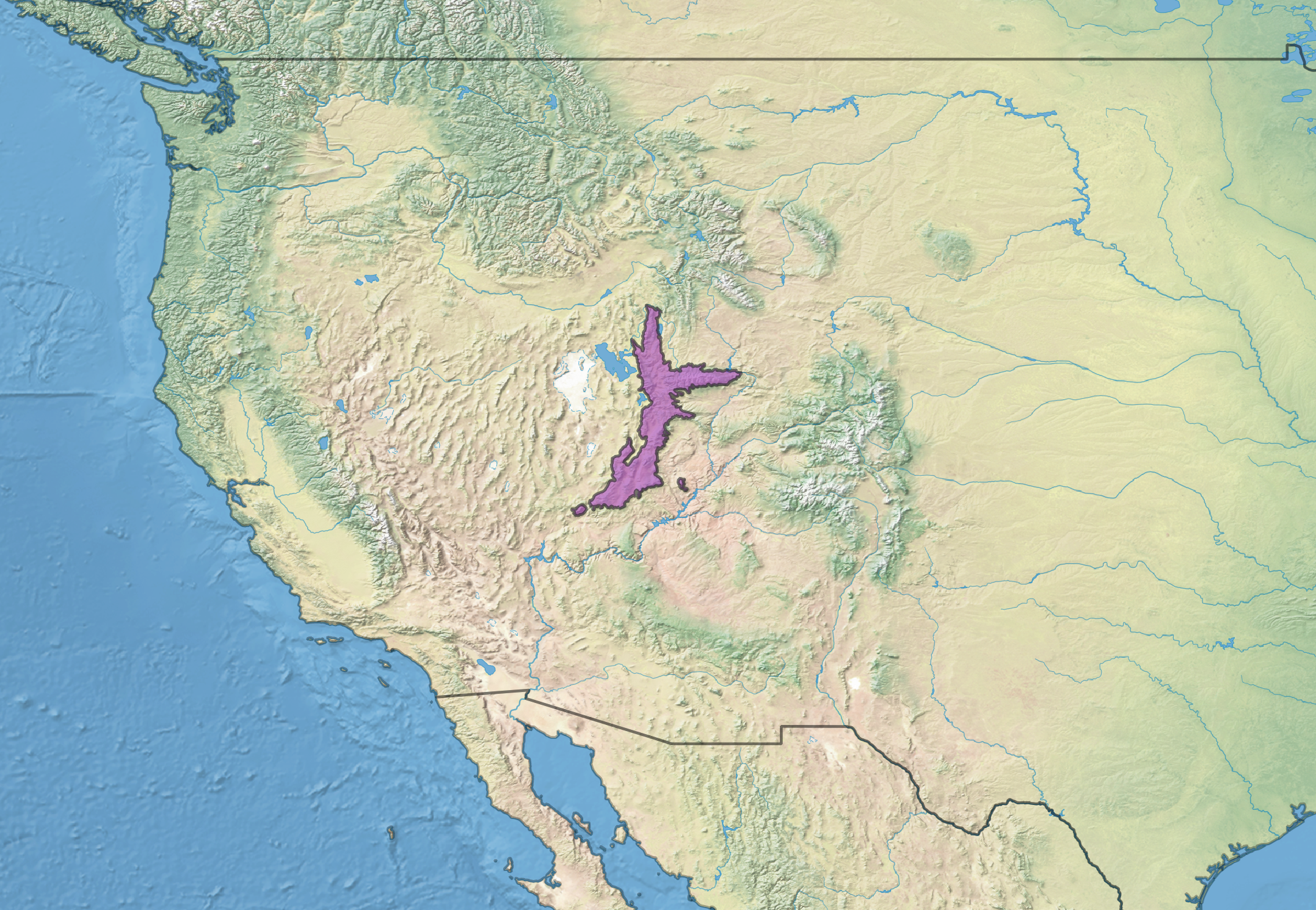
- Map of Wasatch and Uinta montane forests

Ecology
- Realm: Nearctic
- Biome: Temperate coniferous forest
- Borders: List: Colorado Plateau shrublands; Wyoming Basin shrub steppe; Great Basin shrub steppe; South Central Rockies forests; Northern Basin and Range ecoregion
- Bird species: 190
- Mammal species: 91

Geography
- Area: 41,500 km^{2} (16,000 mi^{2})
- Country: United States
- States: Utah; Wyoming; Idaho
- Climate type: Cold semi-arid (BSk)

Conservation
- Habitat loss: 2.45%
- Protected: 68.9%

The Wasatch and Uinta montane forest is a temperate coniferous forest ecoregion in the Wasatch Range and Uinta Mountains of the western Rocky Mountains system, in the Western United States. The ecoregion was defined by the World Wildlife Fund, taken from an ecoregion defined by Omernik and used in the EPA ecoregion system.

== Setting ==
This ecoregion is located almost entirely within the state of Utah, with a very small portion stretching north into southwestern Wyoming and southeastern Idaho. This ecoregion covers the driest ranges of the Rocky Mountains, in the rain shadow of the Sierra Nevada to the west.

== Flora ==
The dominant vegetation type of this ecoregion is coniferous forest, composed mainly of ponderosa pine (Pinus ponderosa), Rocky Mountain Douglas-fir (Pseudotsuga menziesii subsp. glauca), subalpine fir (Abies lasiocarpa), Engelmann spruce (Picea engelmanni), Rocky Mountain juniper (Juniperus scopulorum), two-needle piñon (Pinus edulis), and trembling aspen (Populus tremuloides), with limited populations of limber pine (Pinus flexilis). This ecoregion is unique from other Rocky Mountain ecoregions in that large areas are dominated by gambel oak (Quercus gambelii) and bigtooth maple (Acer grandidentatum).

== Fauna ==
Mammals include mule deer (Odocoileus hemonius), elk (Cervus canadensis), moose (Alces alces), bighorn sheep (Ovis canadensis), mountain goat (Oreamnos americanus), black bear (Ursus americanus) cougar (Puma concolor), and wolverine (Gulo gulo).

The grizzly bear and gray wolf are also native to these forests, as well as much of the rest of Utah, but have been extirpated from the region due to overhunting, with grizzly bears having not been seen in Utah since 1922, when the last known individual, Old Ephraim, was shot and killed. Gray wolves have begun to return to Utah, primarily in the far northeastern reaches of state, where it borders Wyoming and Idaho. Both bears and wolves have been under threat, due primarily to the livestock industry which is an obstacle currently preventing their return.

== Threats and preservation ==
The majority of this ecoregion has been greatly affected by livestock grazing, logging, mining, and recreational uses such as downhill skiing, and as a result, its conservation status is "critical/endangered". Very few areas are protected, and the largest area that is protected, the High Uintas Wilderness in northeastern Utah, mainly protects areas in the high alpine zone, with the more diverse montane and subalpine zones being almost entirely unprotected. The main threats to this ecoregion's integrity are motorised recreation, widespread livestock grazing and downhill skiing. This region has also been severely effected by mountain pine beetle outbreaks in the last decades, killing large swathes of forest.

== See also ==
- List of ecoregions in the United States (WWF)
