= List of freshwater ecoregions of Latin America and the Caribbean =

This is a list of freshwater ecoregions in Latin America and the Caribbean, as identified by the World Wildlife Fund (WWF).

The WWF divides the Earth's land surface into ecoregions, defined as "large area[s] of land or water containing a distinct assemblage of natural communities and species". Ecoregions are grouped into complexes and bioregions, defined as, "a complex of ecoregions that share a similar biogeographic history, and thus often have strong affinities at higher taxonomic levels (e.g. genera, families)." The Earth's land surface is divided into eight biogeographic realms. Latin America corresponds, roughly, to the Neotropical realm, although northern Mexico lies within the Nearctic.

Each ecoregion is also classified into major habitat types, or biomes.

Many consider this classification to be quite decisive, and some propose these as stable borders for bioregional democracy initiatives.

== By complex ==
=== Baja California Complex ===
- Baja California (Mexico)

=== Colorado River Complex ===
- Colorado Delta (Mexico)
- Sonoran (Mexico)

=== Sinaloan Coastal Complex ===
- Sinaloan Coastal (Mexico)

=== Rio Bravo Complex ===
- Río Bravo (Mexico, United States)
- Pecos (United States)
- Guzman (Mexico, United States)
- Mapimí (Mexico)
- Cuatro Ciénegas (Mexico)
- Llanos El Salado (Mexico)
- Conchos (Mexico)
- Lower Rio Bravo (Mexico)
- Rio San Juan (Mexico)
- Rio Salado (Mexico)

=== Lerma/Santiago Complex ===
- Santiago (Mexico)
- Chapala (Mexico)
- Lerma (Mexico)
- Rio Verde Headwaters (Mexico)
- Manantlan/Ameca (Mexico)

=== Rio Panuco Complex ===
- Rio Panuco (Mexico)

=== Balsas Complex ===
- Balsas (Mexico)

=== Pacific Central Complex ===
- Tehuantepec (Costa Rica, El Salvador, Guatemala, Honduras, Mexico, Nicaragua)

=== Atlantic Central Complex ===
- Southern Veracruz (Mexico)
- Belizean Lowlands (Belize, Guatemala, Mexico)
- Central American Caribbean Lowlands (Honduras, Nicaragua)
- Talamancan Highlands (Costa Rica, Panama)
- Catemaco (Mexico)
- Coatzacoalcos (Mexico)
- Grijalva-Usumacinta (Guatemala, Mexico)
- Yucatán (Mexico)
- Guatemalan Highlands (Guatemala)
- Central American Karst Highlands (Belize, Guatemala)
- Honduran/Nicaraguan Highlands (Honduras, Nicaragua)
- Lake Nicaragua (Costa Rica, Nicaragua)

=== Isthmus Atlantic Complex ===
- Isthmus Atlantic (Panama)

=== Isthmus Pacific Complex ===
- Isthmus Pacific (Costa Rica, Panama)

=== Bahama Archipelago Complex ===
- Bahamas (Bahamas, Turks and Caicos Islands)

=== Western Insular Caribbean Complex ===
- Cuba (Cuba)
- Hispaniola (Dominican Republic, Haiti)
- Jamaica (Jamaica)
- Cayman Islands (Cayman Islands)
- Florida Keys (United States)

=== Eastern Insular Caribbean Complex ===
- Puerto Rico and Virgin Islands (British Virgin Islands, Puerto Rico, US Virgin Islands)
- Windward and Leeward Islands (Anguilla, Antigua and Barbuda, Barbados, Dominica, Grenada, Guadeloupe, Martinique, Montserrat, Saba, Saint Barthélemy, Saint Kitts and Nevis, Saint Lucia, Saint Martin, Saint Vincent and the Grenadines, Sint Eustatius)

=== Choco Complex ===
- Choco (Colombia, Ecuador, Panama)

=== South American Caribbean Complex ===
- Magdalena (Colombia)
- Momposina Depression-Rio Cesar (Colombia)
- Cienega Grande de Santa Marta (Colombia)
- Guajira Desert (Colombia, Venezuela)
- Maracaibo Basin (Venezuela)

=== High Andean Complex ===
- Páramos (Colombia, Ecuador, Peru, Venezuela)
- Peru High Andean Complex (Bolivia, Peru)
- Bolivian High Andean Complex (Argentina, Bolivia, Chile)
- Arid Puna (Argentina, Bolivia, Chile, Peru)
- Subandean Pampas (Argentina, Bolivia)
- South Andean Yungas (Argentina, Bolivia)

=== Inter-Andean Dry Valleys Complex ===
- Inter-Andean Dry Valleys (Argentina, Bolivia, Colombia, Ecuador, Peru)

=== North Andean Montane Complex ===
- North Andean Montane (Colombia, Ecuador, Peru, Venezuela)
- Humid Andean Yungas (Bolivia, Peru)
- Chuquisaca and Tarija Yungas (Bolivia)
- Salta and Tucuman Yungas (Argentina)
- Sierra de Córdoba (Argentina)

=== Puyango-Tumbes Complex ===
- Puyango-Tumbes (Ecuador, Peru)

=== Atacama/Sechura Complex ===
- Atacama/Sechura Deserts (Chile, Peru)

=== Pacific Coastal Desert Complex ===
- Pacific Coastal Deserts (Peru, Chile)

=== Lake Titicaca/Poopo Complex ===
- Lake Titicaca (Bolivia, Peru)
- Lake Poopo (Bolivia)

=== Galápagos Complex ===
- Galápagos (Ecuador)

=== Mediterranean Chile Complex ===
- North Mediterranean Chile (Chile)
- South Mediterranean Chile (Chile)

=== Juan Fernández Islands Complex ===
- Juan Fernández Islands (Chile)

=== Southern Chile Complex ===
- Valdivian (Chile)
- Chiloe Island (Chile)
- Chonos Archipelago (Chile)
- Magallanes/Ultima Esperanza (Chile)

=== Subantarctic Complex ===
- Subantarctic (Falkland Islands)

=== Venezuelan Coast/Trinidad Complex ===
- Venezuelan Coast/Trinidad (Trinidad and Tobago, Venezuela)
  - Caroni Swamp (Trinidad and Tobago)
  - Nariva Swamp (Trinidad and Tobago)

=== Llanos Complex ===
- Llanos (Colombia, Venezuela)

=== Guiana/Orinoco Complex ===
- Eastern Morichal (Venezuela)
- Orinoco Delta (Venezuela)
- Southern Orinoco (Venezuela)
- Guiana Watershed (Brazil, French Guiana, Guyana, Suriname, Venezuela)

=== Amazon Complex ===
- Amazon Delta (Brazil)
- Amazon Main Channel (Brazil, Peru)
- Northern Amazon Shield Tributaries (Brazil)
- Rio Negro (Brazil, Colombia, Venezuela)
- Upper Amazon Piedmont (Bolivia, Colombia, Ecuador, Peru)
- Western Amazon Lowlands (Bolivia, Brazil, Peru)
- Central Brazilian Shield Tributaries (Bolivia, Brazil)
- Tocantins-Araguaia (Brazil)

=== Northeast Atlantic Complex ===
- Maranhão (Brazil)

=== Mata-Atlantica Complex ===
- Northeast Mata-Atlantica (Brazil)
- East Mata-Atlantica (Brazil)
- Southeast Mata-Atlantica (Brazil)

=== São Francisco Complex ===
- Caatinga (Brazil)
- Cerrado (Brazil)

=== Upper Parana Complex ===
- Upper Parana (Brazil)

=== Beni Complex ===
- Beni (Bolivia)

=== Paraguay-Parana Complex ===
- Pantanal (Bolivia, Brazil, Paraguay)
- Lower Parana (Argentina, Brazil, Paraguay, Uruguay)

=== Southern Atlantic Complex ===
- Jacui Highlands (Brazil, Uruguay)
- Lagoa dos Patos Coastal Plain (Brazil, Uruguay)

=== Chaco Complex ===
- Chaco (Argentina, Bolivia, Paraguay)

=== Pampas Complex ===
- Parana-Platense Basin (Argentina)
- Rio Salado and Arroyo Vallimanca Basin (Argentina)
- Northwest Pampas Basins (Argentina)
- Pampas Coastal Plains (Argentina)
- Southwest Pampas Basins (Argentina)

=== Patagonia Complex ===
- Rio Colorado (Argentina)
- Rio Limay-Neuquen-Rio Negro (Argentina)
- Meseta Somuncura (Argentina)
- Rio Chubut-Rio Chico (Argentina)
- Rio Deseado (Argentina)
- Rio Santa Cruz-Rio Chico (Argentina)
- Rio Coyle (Argentina)
- Rio Gallegos (Argentina)
- Tierra del Fuego-Rio Grande (Argentina, Chile)

== By major habitat type ==
=== Large rivers ===
- Amazon Main Channel (Brazil, Peru)
- Río Bravo (Mexico, United States)
- Central Brazilian Shield Tributaries (Bolivia, Brazil)
- Eastern Morichal (Venezuela)
- Guiana Watershed (Brazil, French Guiana, Guyana, Suriname, Venezuela)
- Lower Rio Bravo (Mexico)
- Rio Negro (Brazil, Colombia, Venezuela)
- Northern Amazon Shield Tributaries (Brazil)
- Upper Parana (Brazil)
- Lower Parana (Argentina, Brazil, Paraguay, Uruguay)
- Tocantins-Araguaia (Brazil)
- Southern Orinoco (Venezuela)
- Upper Amazon Piedmont (Bolivia, Colombia, Ecuador, Peru)
- Western Amazon Lowlands (Bolivia, Brazil, Peru)

=== Large river deltas ===
- Amazon Delta (Brazil)
- Colorado Delta (Mexico)
- Orinoco Delta (Venezuela)
- Parano-Platense Basin (Argentina)

=== Montane rivers and streams ===
- Bolivian High Andean Complex (Argentina, Bolivia, Chile)
- Chuquisaca and Tarija Yungas (Bolivia)
- Humid Andean Yungas (Bolivia, Peru)
- Inter-Andean Dry Valleys (Argentina, Bolivia, Colombia, Ecuador, Peru)
- North Andean Montane (Colombia, Ecuador, Peru, Venezuela)
- Peru High Andean Complex (Bolivia, Peru)
- Salta and Tucuman Yungas (Argentina)
- Sierra de Córdoba (Argentina)
- South Andean Yungas (Argentina, Bolivia)
- Talamancan Highlands (Costa Rica, Panama)

=== Wet-Region rivers and streams ===
- Bahamas (Bahamas, Turks and Caicos Islands)
- Balsas (Mexico)
- Belizean Lowlands (Belize, Guatemala, Mexico)
- Cayman Islands (Cayman Islands)
- Central American Caribbean Lowlands (Honduras, Nicaragua)
- Central American Karst Highlands (Belize, Guatemala)
- Cerrado (Brazil)
- Chaco (Argentina, Bolivia, Paraguay)
- Chiloe Island (Chile)
- Choco (Colombia, Ecuador, Panama)
- Chonos Archipelago (Chile)
- Rio Chubut-Rio Chico (Argentina)
- Cienega Grande de Santa Marta (Colombia)
- Coatzacoalcos (Mexico)
- Rio Colorado (Argentina)
- Rio Coyle (Argentina)
- Cuba (Cuba)
- Rio Deseado (Argentina)
- East Mata-Atlantica (Brazil)
- Florida Keys (United States)
- Rio Gallegos (Argentina)
- Grijalva-Usumacinta (Guatemala, Mexico)
- Hispaniola (Dominican Republic, Haiti)
- Honduran/Nicaraguan Highlands (Honduras, Nicaragua)
- Isthmus Atlantic (Panama)
- Isthmus Pacific (Costa Rica, Panama)
- Jacui Highlands (Brazil, Uruguay)
- Jamaica (Jamaica)
- Juan Fernández Islands (Chile)
- Lagoa dos Patos Coastal Plain (Brazil, Uruguay)
- Rio Limay-Neuquen-Rio Negro (Argentina)
- Magdalena (Colombia)
- Manantlan/Ameca (Mexico)
- Maracaibo Basin (Venezuela)
- Maranhão (Brazil)
- Momposina Depression-Rio Cesar (Colombia)
- Rio Panuco (Mexico)
- Puerto Rico and Virgin Islands (British Virgin Islands, Puerto Rico, US Virgin Islands)
- Puyango-Tumbes (Ecuador, Peru)
- Rio Santa Cruz-Rio Chico (Argentina)
- Santiago (Mexico)
- Sinaloan Coastal (Mexico)
- Southeast Mata-Atlantica (Brazil)
- Southern Veracruz (Mexico)
- Tehuantepec (Costa Rica, El Salvador, Guatemala, Honduras, Mexico, Nicaragua)
- Tierra del Fuego-Rio Grande (Argentina, Chile)
- Valdivian (Chile)
- Venezuelan Coast/Trinidad (Trinidad and Tobago, Venezuela)
- Windward and Leeward Islands (Anguilla, Antigua and Barbuda, Barbados, Dominica, Grenada, Guadeloupe, Martinique, Montserrat, Saba, Saint Barthélemy, Saint Kitts and Nevis, Saint Lucia, Saint Martin, Saint Vincent and the Grenadines, Sint Eustatius)
- Yucatán (Mexico)

=== Xeric-Region rivers and streams ===
- Atacama/Sechura Deserts (Chile, Peru)
- Baja California (Mexico)
- Caatinga (Brazil)
- Chapala (Mexico)
- Conchos (Mexico)
- Galápagos (Ecuador)
- Guajira Desert (Colombia, Venezuela)
- North Mediterranean Chile (Chile)
- Northeast Mata-Atlantica (Brazil)
- Pacific Coastal Deserts (Peru, Chile)
- Pecos (United States)
- Rio Salado (Mexico)
- Rio San Juan (Mexico)
- Sonoran (Mexico)
- South Mediterranean Chile (Chile)
- Rio Verde Headwaters (Mexico)

=== Xeric-Region endorheic (closed) basins ===
- Arid Puna (Argentina, Bolivia, Chile, Peru)
- Cuatro Ciénegas (Mexico)
- Guzman (Mexico, United States)
- Lerma (Mexico)
- Llanos El Salado (Mexico)
- Mapimí (Mexico)
- Meseta Somuncura (Argentina)
- Northwest Pampas Basins (Argentina)
- Southwest Pampas Basins (Argentina)
- Subandean Pampas (Argentina, Bolivia)

=== Flooded grasslands and savannas ===
- Beni (Bolivia)
- Llanos (Colombia, Venezuela)
- Pampas Coastal Plains (Argentina)
- Pantanal (Bolivia, Brazil, Paraguay)
- Rio Salado and Arroyo Vallimanca Basin (Argentina)

=== Cold streams, bogs, swamps, and mires ===
- Magallanes/Ultima Esperanza (Argentina, Chile)
- Páramos (Colombia, Ecuador, Peru, Venezuela)
- Subantarctic (Falkland Islands)

=== Large lakes ===
- Catemaco (Mexico)
- Guatemalan Highlands (Guatemala)
- Lake Nicaragua (Costa Rica, Nicaragua)
- Lake Poopo (Bolivia)
- Lake Titicaca (Bolivia, Peru)
