= Death Valley freshwater ecoregion =

Ecological region in California and Nevada, US

Coordinates: 36°25′N 116°20′W

The Death Valley freshwater ecoregion is a freshwater ecoregion in the western United States. It consists of endorheic rivers, lakes, and springs in the drainages of the Owens, Amargosa, and Mojave Rivers, in central-eastern California and southwestern Nevada.

Most of the ecoregion lies between 610 and 1,220 meters elevation. It consists of north–south trending mountain ranges that rise along fault zones, separated by sedimentary basins. The ecoregion reaches to the peak of Mount Whitney (4,421 metres (14,505 ft)) in the Sierra Nevada, and descends to the Badwater Basin in Death Valley, which is the lowest point in North America at −86 metres (−282 ft).

== Fauna ==
The ecoregion is home to several endemic species and subspecies of fish, some of which have very limited ranges. Several are adapted to extreme environments. The small and isolated ranges and populations of many native species and subspecies make them particularly vulnerable to extinction.

There are four endemic species of pupfish, the Owens pupfish (Cyprinodon radiosus), Devil's Hole pupfish (Cyprinodon diabolis), Cyprinodon nevadensis, and the Death Valley pupfish (Cyprinodon salinus). C. nevadensis has five recognized subspecies and the Death Valley pupfish has two. The Death Valley pupfish live at the lowest elevations in Death Valley, where summer temperatures can reach 130 °F (54 °C).

The Devil's Hole pupfish is found only in a single spring-fed limestone cavern in Ash Meadows, California, and at 23 square yards (19 m^{2}) has the smallest known range of any vertebrate species.

The Owens sucker (Catostomus fumeiventris) is endemic to the Owens River basin, and has been introduced to June Lake in the Mono Lake basin as well as the Santa Clara River in coastal Southern California. The ecoregion is home to endemic subspecies of Tui chub (Gila bicolor), and three endemic subspecies of speckled dace (Rhinichthys osculus). The endemic Ash Meadows killifish (Empetrichthys merriami) is thought to be extinct.

== Conservation and threats ==
For over a century the ecoregion's rivers and streams have been altered by water diversion for agriculture and cities and groundwater extraction. Construction of the Los Angeles Aqueduct in the early 20th century diverted Owens Valley and Mono Lake headwater streams to coastal Los Angeles, hundreds of miles south, and desiccated the Owens River.

Introduced species also threatened native and endemic species.

== Protected areas ==
Protected areas include Ash Meadows National Wildlife Refuge, which encompasses a desert oasis of over 30 springs and seeps that cover an area of 756 km^{2}, and is home to the Devil's Hole pupfish. Death Valley National Park protects the Amargosa River basin and the springs and caverns of the Death Valley region.

== See also ==
- South Lahontan hydrologic region
