= Wyoming Basin shrub steppe =

Xeric shrubland ecoregion of the western United States

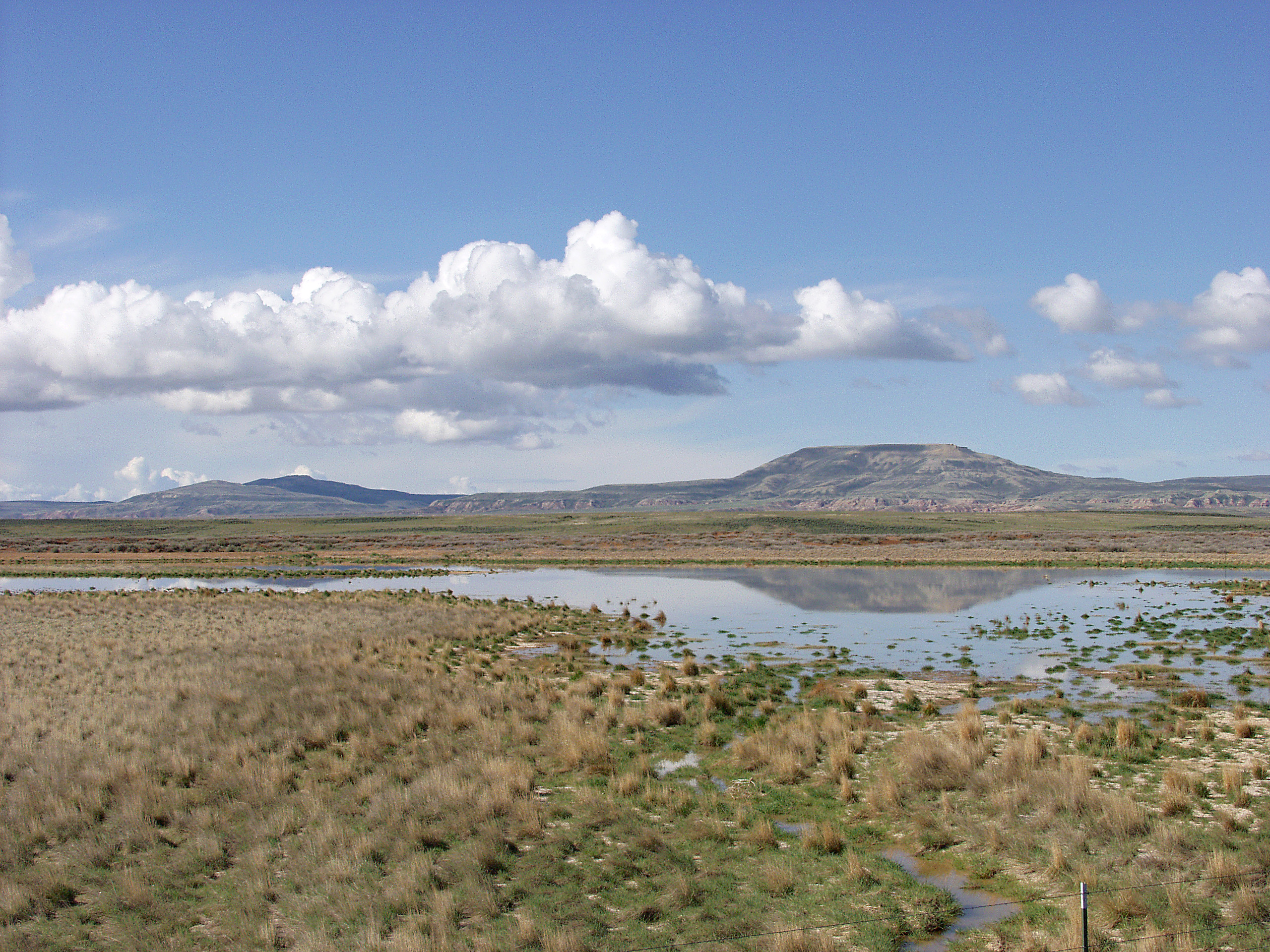
- Ephemeral wetland in the Red Desert of south-central Wyoming

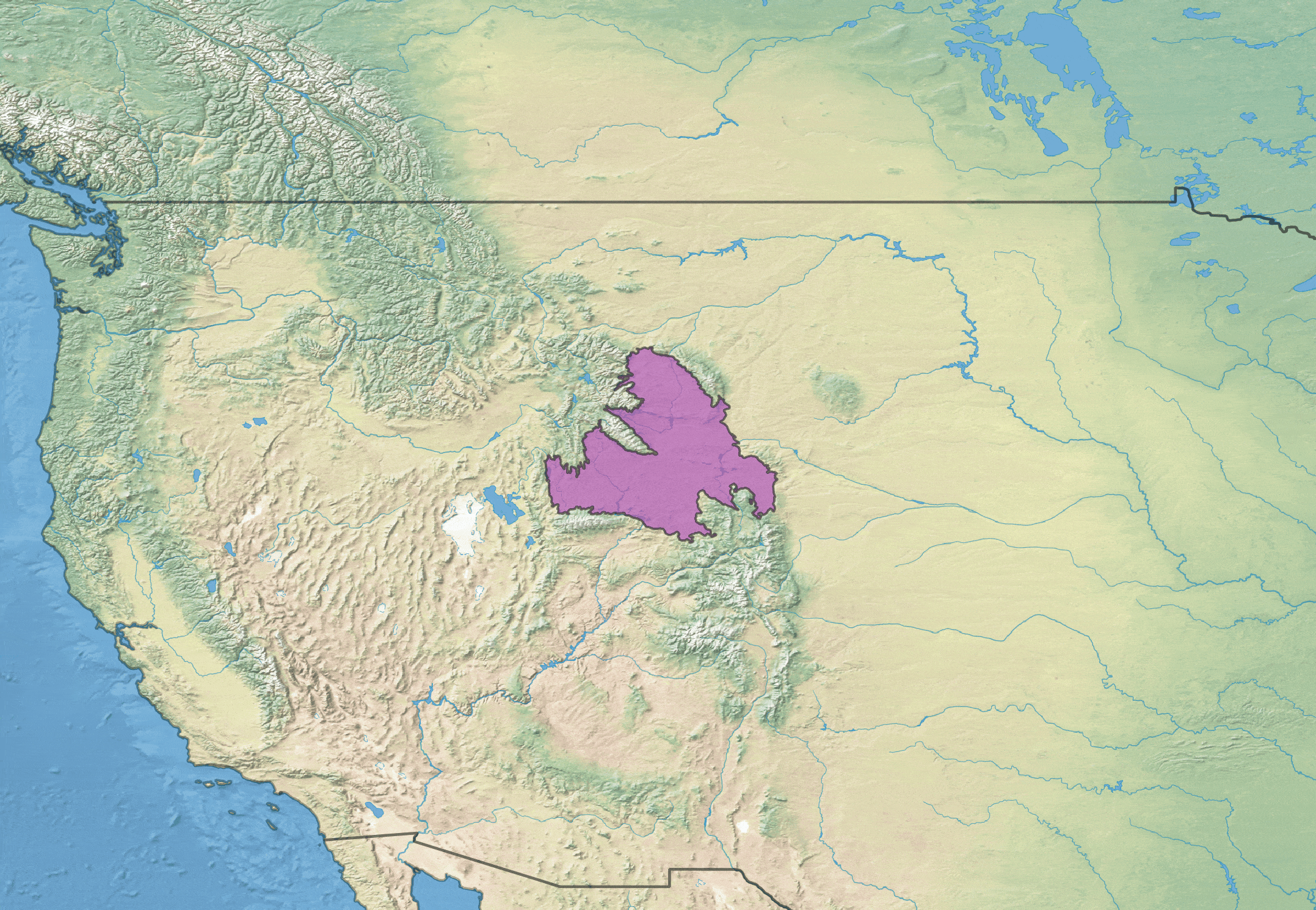
- Map of Wyoming Basin shrub steppe

Ecology
- Realm: Nearctic
- Biome: Deserts and xeric shrublands
- Borders: List: South Central Rockies forests; Colorado Rockies forests; Northern short grasslands; Wasatch and Uinta montane forests; Colorado Plateau shrublands; Great Basin shrub steppe
- Bird species: 189
- Mammal species: 83

Geography
- Area: 132,348 km^{2} (51,100 mi^{2})
- Country: United States
- States: Wyoming; Colorado; Utah; Idaho; Montana
- Climate type: Cold semi-arid (BSk)

Conservation
- Habitat loss: 4.5412%
- Protected: 42.58%

The Wyoming Basin shrub steppe ecoregion, within the deserts and xeric shrublands biome, is a shrub steppe in the northwestern United States.

== Setting ==
This ecoregion is located almost entirely within the western and central portions of Wyoming, but does extend minimally into southeastern Idaho, south-central Montana, north-central Utah, and northwestern Colorado. It is located within multiple high-altitude intermontane basins largely surrounded by various subranges of the Rocky Mountains. These basins are in the rain shadow of the North American Cordillera and as such have an arid to semi-arid climate with long, very cold winters and short, hot summers.

== Flora ==
The dominant vegetation of this ecoregion is sagebrush (Artemisia tridentata), often associated with various Agropyron species or fescue grass. At its upper altitudinal limit, the shrub steppe grades into the bordering mountain ecoregions, namely the South Central Rockies forests, the Colorado Rockies forests, and the Wasatch and Uinta montane forests. Ecotones between the shrub steppe and mountain forests may occur as high as 3,000 metres (9,800 ft) in some areas. Between mountain ranges, this ecoregion grades into the Northern short grasslands to the east and in a very small portion to the north, the Colorado Plateau shrublands to the south, and the Great Basin shrub steppe in a very small portion in the far west.

== Fauna ==
Mammals in this ecoregion include elk (Cervus canadensis), white-tailed prairie dog (Cynomys leucurus), coyote (Canis latrans), swift fox (Vulpes velox), pronghorn (Antilocapra americana), bison (Bison bison bison), and black-footed ferret (Mustela nigripes).

Sagebrush-dependent bird species native to the region include the greater sage-grouse (Centrocercus urophasianus), sagebrush sparrow (Artemisiospiza nevadensis), Brewer's sparrow (Spizella breweri), and sage thrasher (Oreoscoptes montanus). Areas with less sagebrush cover often support grassland or semidesert species, such as long-billed curlew (Numenius americanus), western meadowlark (Sturnella neglecta), lark sparrow (Chondestes grammacus), vesper sparrow (Pooecetes gramineus), thick-billed longspur (Rhynchophanes mccownii), mountain plover (Anarhynchus montanus), or loggerhead shrike (Lanius ludovicianus).

Common reptiles in the area include the sagebrush lizard (Sceloporus graciosus), greater short-horned lizard or "horned toad" (Phrynosoma hernandesi), and prairie rattlesnake (Crotalus viridis viridis).

== Conservation status ==
Though little of this ecoregion is protected, it is largely intact due to the harsh climate and resulting poor agricultural potential. However, heavy livestock grazing, fire suppression, and the introduction of non-native plants (especially grasses) have resulted in some areas being significantly altered. These, along with oil and gas exploration and mining, are the most serious threats to the ecoregion's integrity.

== See also ==
- List of ecoregions in the United States (WWF)
- Red Desert (Wyoming)
- Sagebrush steppe
- Bighorn Basin
- Great Divide Basin
