= Southern California Coastal–Baja California freshwater ecoregion =

Ecoregion in North America

Southern California Coastal–Baja California freshwater ecoregion is a freshwater ecoregion in Western North America. It encompasses parts of central and southern California, west of the Coast Ranges, and the majority of Mexico's Baja California Peninsula, extending from the southern end of Monterey Bay to the southern tip of the Baja California Peninsula.

== Geography ==
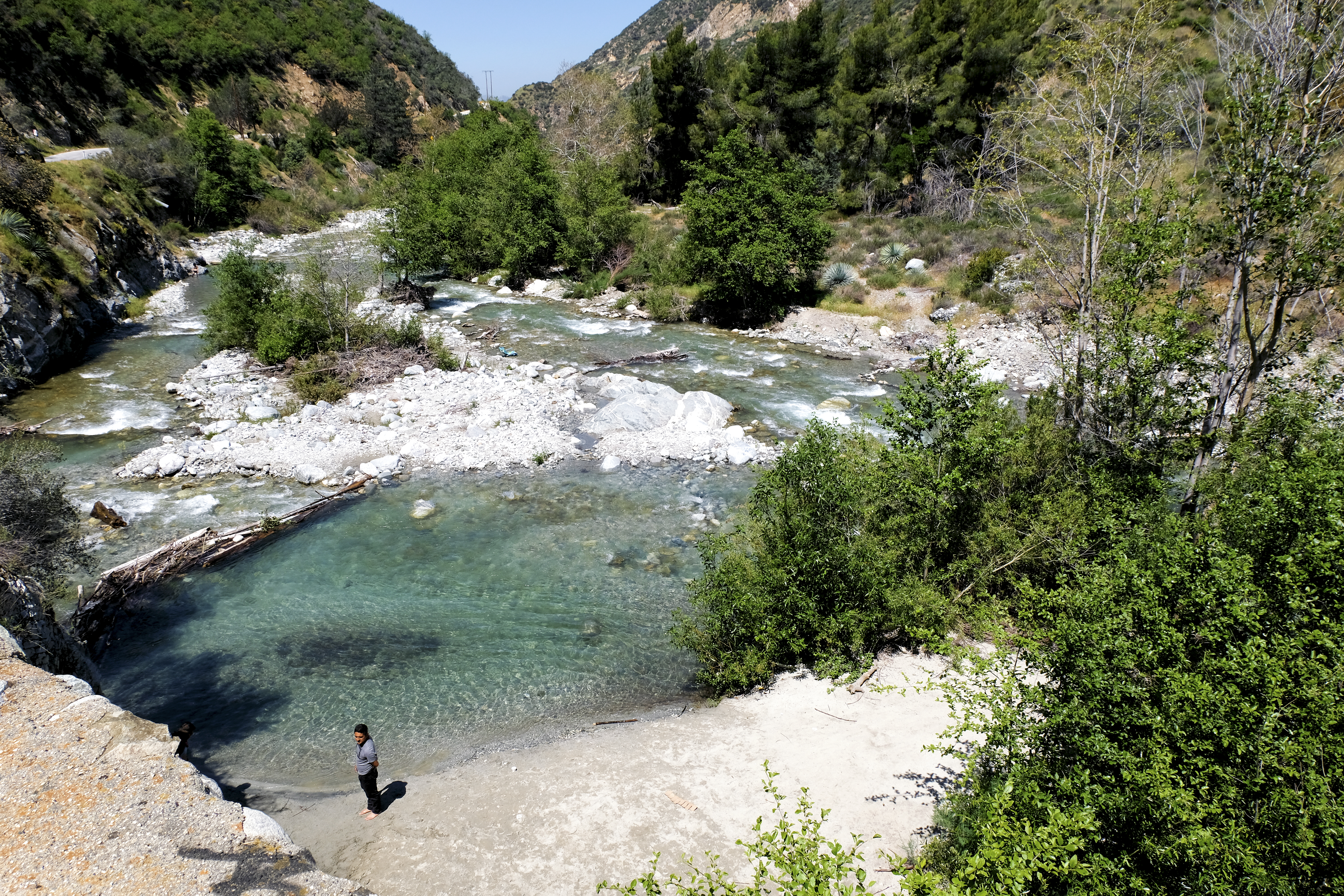
East fork of the San Gabriel River

Most rivers and streams are short and relatively small, originating in the mountains and flowing to the sea. The climate ranges from semi-humid to arid, and rainfall is highly seasonal and can be irregular, so many streams have big seasonal variations in flow, or are intermittent.

The ecoregion has an area of 155,850 square kilometres (60,170 sq mi). 76% of the ecoregion is in Mexico's states of Baja California and Baja California Sur, and 24% is in California.

Elevations range from sea level to over 3300 meters. The ecoregion includes the western slope of the Santa Lucia Mountains in central California, the seaward slopes of the Transverse Ranges and northern Peninsular Ranges in Southern California and Northern Baja California, and both the western and eastern (Pacific and Gulf of California) sides of the Peninsular Ranges on the Baja California Peninsula. It also includes the Channel Islands of California, and Cedros Island off the western coast of Baja California.

Larger rivers include the Santa Ynez River in Santa Barbara County, the Ventura River in Ventura County, the Santa Clara River in Los Angeles and Ventura counties, and the Los Angeles, San Gabriel, and Santa Ana rivers in the Los Angeles Basin.

== Fauna ==
Fish species endemic to the ecoregion include the Santa Ana sucker (Catostomus santaanae), California killifish (Fundulus parvipinnis), Peninsular clingfish (Gobiesox juniperoserrai), and Baja California killifish (Fundulus lima). Two subspecies of three-spined stickleback (Gasterosteus aculeatus) are endemic to southern California – the unarmored threespine stickleback (G. a. williamsoni) and the Santa Ana stickleback (G. a. santaeannae).

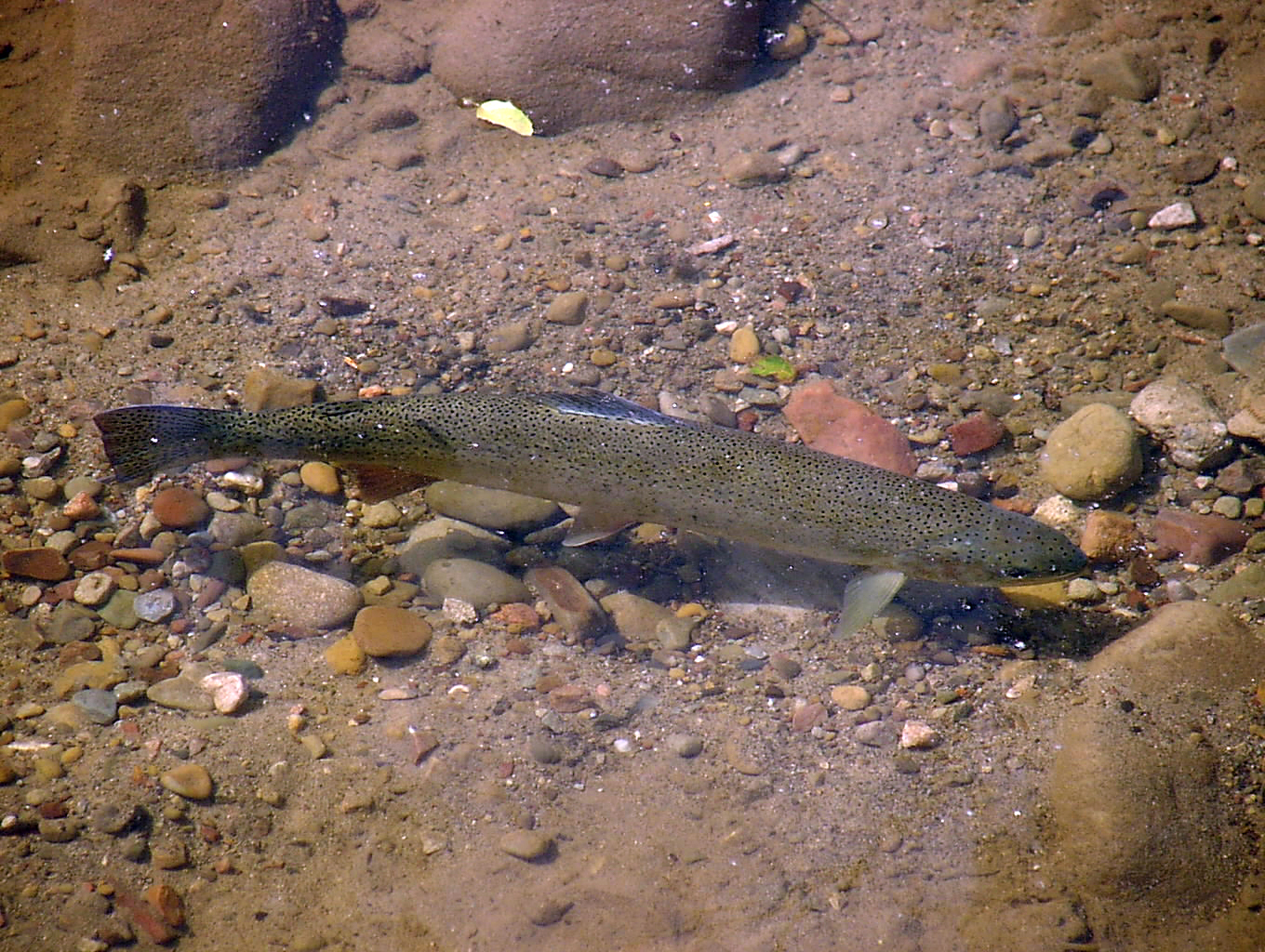
Steelhead (Onchorhynchus mykiss) in Maria Ygnacio Creek, Santa Barbara County, California.

Anadromous steelhead trout (Onchorhynchus mykiss) are found some southern California streams. The ecoregion is the southern limit of their range, and the Southern California steelhead populations are genetically adapted to warmer water than most steelhead and salmon species. The San Pedro Mártir trout is endemic to the Sierra San Pedro Mártir in northern Baja California. Some authorities consider the San Pedro Mártir trout a separate species (Onchorhynchus nelsoni), while others consider it a subspecies of steelhead (Onchorhynchus mykiss nelsoni).
