= Oregon Lakes =

Freshwater ecoregion in the United States

Oregon Lakes is a freshwater ecoregion in the western United States. It includes several closed basins in southern-central Oregon and adjacent parts of California and Nevada, including the Harney Basin, Warner Valley, and the basins of Lake Abert and Summer Lake.

== Geography ==
The ecoregion includes several closed, or endorheic, basins. The ecoregions's streams empty into alkaline lakes or onto playas. The ecoregion is bounded on the north and east by the Columbia River basin, on the west by the upper basin of the Klamath River, on the southwest by the upper Sacramento River watershed, and on the south and southeast by the closed Lahontan Basin.

The ecoregion lies in the rain shadow of the Cascade Range, and has a semi-arid and continental climate. The Oregon Lakes is mostly within the Snake–Columbia shrub steppe terrestrial ecoregion, and the predominant vegetation is low shrubland and sparse grassland.

== Fauna ==
The Oregon Lakes ecoregion has 23 native species of fish. These include two endemic species – the Borax Lake chub (Gila boraxobius), which is found only in the Borax Lake basin in Oregon, and the Warner sucker (Catostomus warnerensis), found in the Warner Valley in Oregon and Nevada, where it inhabits the Warner Lakes and the valley's streams, sloughs, and ephemeral lakes.
