= Snake–Columbia shrub steppe =

Xeric shrubland ecoregion in the northwestern United States

Coordinates: 45°N 117°W

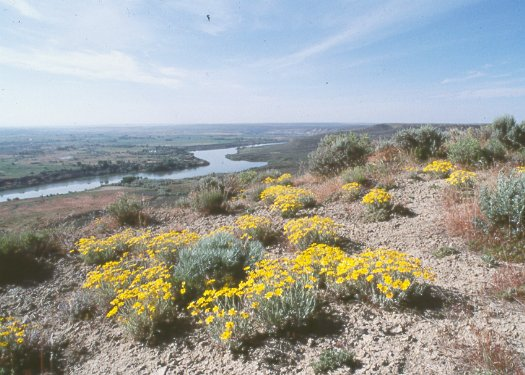
- Shrub-steppe of Hagerman Fossil Beds National Monument, Idaho

Ecology
- Realm: Nearctic
- Biome: Deserts and xeric shrublands
- Borders: List: Blue Mountains forests; Cascade Mountains leeward forests; Eastern Cascades forests; Palouse grasslands; South Central Rockies forests
- Bird species: 207
- Mammal species: 104

Geography
- Area: 218,077 km^{2} (84,200 mi^{2})
- Country: United States
- States: Washington; Oregon; California; Idaho; Nevada
- Climate type: Cold desert (BWk) and cold semi-arid (BSk)

Conservation
- Habitat loss: 19.112%
- Protected: 58.45%

The Snake–Columbia shrub steppe is an ecoregion defined by the World Wide Fund for Nature (WWF). This ecoregion receives little precipitation because it is within the rain shadow of the Cascade Range. The ecoregion dominates Washington's western portion of the Columbia Basin. It extends south from the Columbia River along the Deschutes River Basin, expanding to cover most of southeast Oregon, including the Oregon Lakes region. This ecoregion reaches south from Oregon into northern Nevada and the northeast corner of California. It also connects east onto the Snake River Plain, which follows east from Hells Canyon to the continental divide in eastern Idaho.

Information about this ecoregion is covered by three articles that follow the ecoregion definitions of the United States Environmental Protection Agency:

- Columbia Plateau
- Snake River Plain
- Northern Basin and Range

== See also ==
- List of ecoregions in the United States (WWF)
