= Blue Mountains (ecoregion) =

Temperate coniferous forests ecoregion of the United States

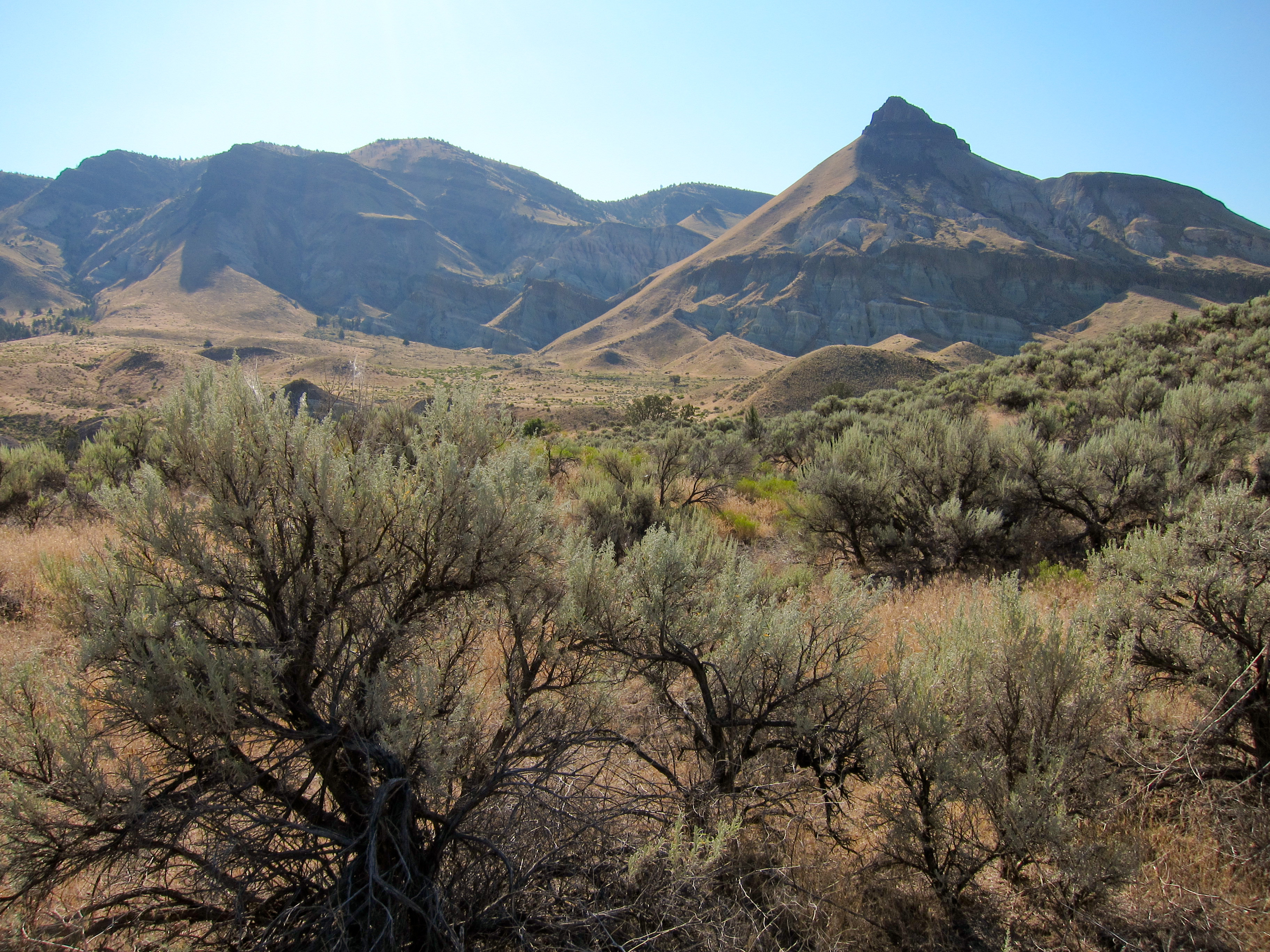
- John Day Fossil Beds National Monument

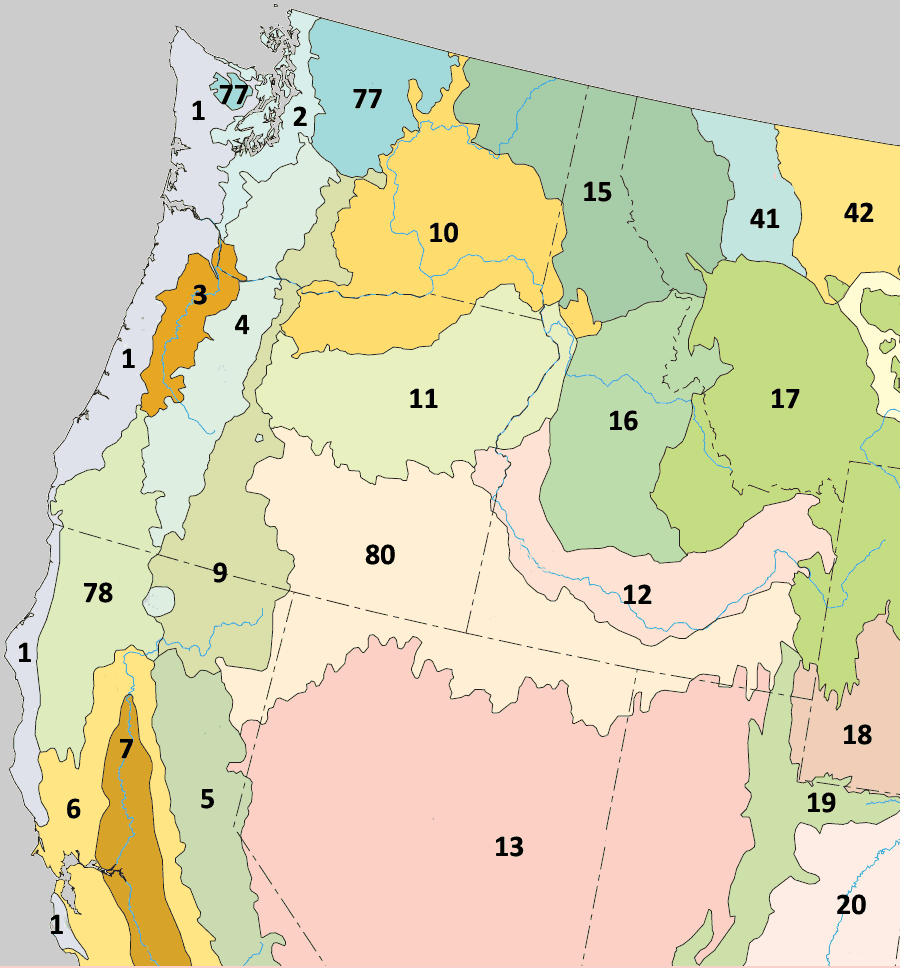
- Level III ecoregions in the Pacific Northwest: the Blue Mountains are marked 11

Ecology
- Realm: Nearctic
- Biome: Temperate coniferous forests
- Borders: List: Eastern Cascades Slopes and Foothills (9); Columbia Plateau (10); Snake River Plain (12); Northern Rockies (15); Idaho Batholith (16); Northern Basin and Range (80)

Geography
- Country: United States
- States: Oregon; Idaho; Washington

The Blue Mountains ecoregion is a Level III ecoregion designated by the United States Environmental Protection Agency (EPA) in the Pacific Northwest, mainly in the state of Oregon, with small areas over the state border in Idaho and southeastern Washington. It is also contiguous with the World Wildlife Fund's Blue Mountain forests ecoregion.

== Setting ==
This ecoregion extends from the Redmond area of Central Oregon, across a wide swath of the Columbia Plateau in Eastern Oregon, to Hells Canyon on the Snake River at the border of the three states. The ecoregion is named for the Blue Mountains and contains a complex of basins and mountain ranges that, at average 2100-2900m, are lower and more open than the neighboring Cascades and Northern Rocky Mountains but do include some steep landscape of which Hells Canyon at 1,660m is North America's deepest gorge. The mountains of the ecoregion include the Strawberry Range, Greenhorn, Elkhorn, Aldrich and Maury Mountains in the Blue Mountains, the gentler Ochoco Mountains to the west and the rugged Wallowa Mountains to the east. Rivers include the Grande Ronde, Powder Rivers and Malheur Rivers, all tributaries of the Snake and the John Day and Umatilla Rivers, tributaries of the Columbia.

Like the Cascades, but unlike the Northern Rockies, the Blue Mountains are mostly volcanic in origin. However, the core of the Blue Mountains and the highest ranges, the Wallowa and Elkhorn mountains, are composed of granitic intrusives, deep sea sediments, and metamorphosed rocks.

== Flora ==
Habitats within the ecoregion include desert-like shrubland, bluebunch grasslands, pine forest, and alpine highlands as well as riverbanks and wetlands. This area is home to some of North America's largest stands of old growth forest including ponderosa pine (Pinus ponderosa), Engelmann spruce (Picea engelmannii) and other spruces, western larch (Larix occidentalis) and grand fir (Abies grandis) and other firs (Abies spp.). Other important plants are sagebrush (Artemisia tridentata), juniper (Juniperus occidentalis), Douglas fir (Pseudotsuga menziesii), and lodgepole pine (pinus contorta).

== Fauna ==
Birds of the area include bald eagle, northern spotted owl, Lewis's woodpecker, Williamson's sapsucker, red-breasted nuthatch, golden-crowned kinglet and many migratory species, with the riverbanks important habitat for this birdlife. Mammals that move through the mountain grasslands include elk (including the largest herd in North America at Hells Canyon), bighorn sheep and mule deer. Wolves were extirpated in the early 20th century but several wolf packs have recolonized the ecoregion. Native fish include Chinook Salmon, Steelhead, Redband Trout, Coho Salmon, Bull Trout, and Pacific Lamprey.

== Threats and preservation ==
These habitats are vulnerable to logging, livestock grazing, river and fire control schemes and only about 10% of the original forest remains intact. The region includes significant landholdings by the United States Forest Service and the Bureau of Land Management. Much of the land is grazed by cattle, unlike the Cascades and Northern Rockies ecoregions. Large blocks of intact forest remaining include: Eagle Cap Wilderness in the Wallowa–Whitman National Forest, Hells Canyon National Recreation Area, the North Fork John Day Wilderness, Wenaha–Tucannon Wilderness of Umatilla National Forest, Strawberry Mountain Wilderness in Malheur National Forest and the northern part of Ochoco National Forest. These are all quite fragmented and logging of ponderosa pine in particular is an ongoing threat.

== Level IV ecoregions ==
The Blue Mountains ecoregion has been subdivided into fourteen Level IV ecoregions, as described below.

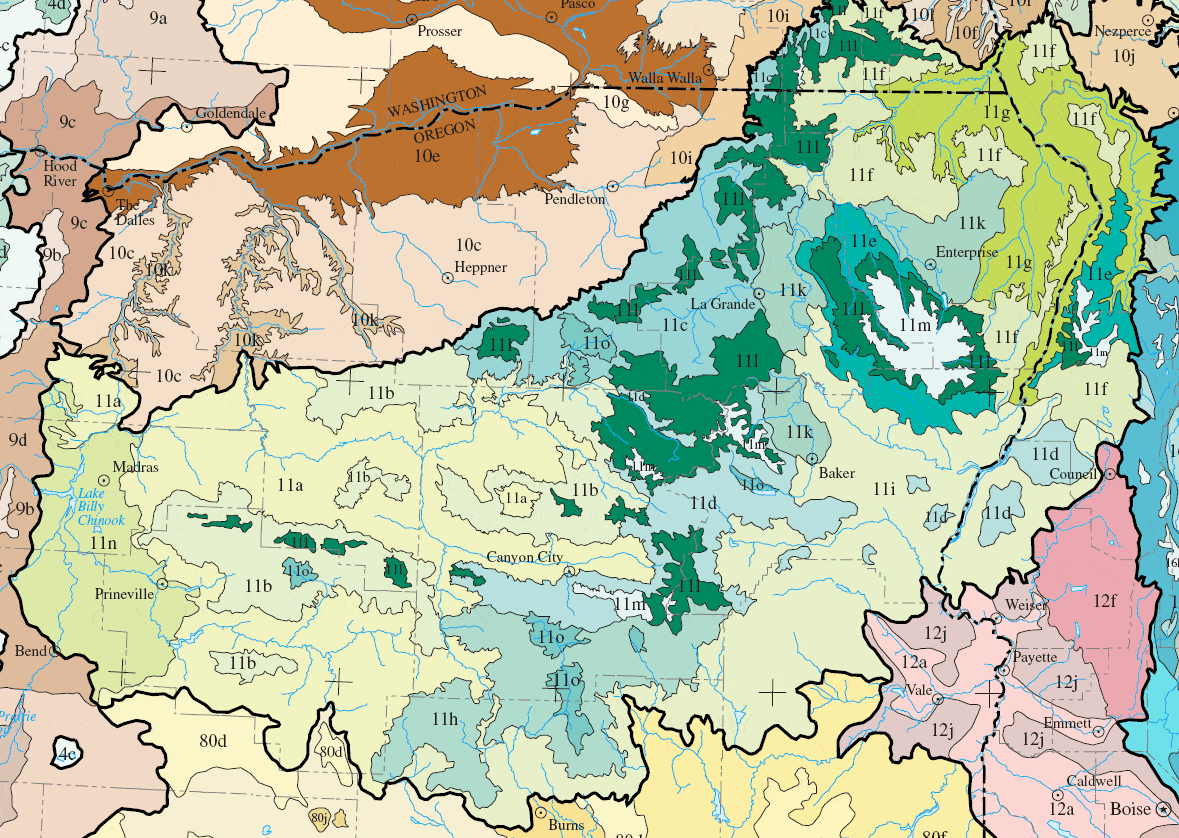
Level IV ecoregions in the Blue Mountains. (Full map).

=== John Day/Clarno Uplands (11a) ===
The John Day/Clarno Uplands ecoregion forms a ring of semi-arid foothills and low mountains surrounding the western perimeter of the Blue Mountains. Elevation varies from 1,200 to 5,500 feet (366 to 1,676 m). Highly dissected hills, palisades, and colorful ash beds flank the valleys of the John Day and Crooked rivers. Scattered buttes occur. The region has a continental climate moderated somewhat by marine influence. Grasslands support Bluebunch wheatgrass, Idaho fescue, basin wildrye, Wyoming big sagebrush, and Thurber needlegrass.

Higher elevations feature western juniper in transition to the ponderosa pine forests of the neighboring John Day/Clarno Highlands. Juniper woodlands have expanded markedly into the sagebrush-grassland during the twentieth century due to a combination of climatic factors, fire suppression, and grazing pressure. Riparian areas support white alder, mockorange, western chokecherry, clematis, willows, black cottonwood, and water birch. The largest of the Blue Mountains subregions, the John Day/Clarno Uplands covers 5,022 square miles (13,007 km^{2}) in Oregon, including all three units of the John Day Fossil Beds National Monument and portions of the Warm Springs Indian Reservation and the Crooked River National Grassland.

=== John Day/Clarno Highlands (11b) ===
The John Day/Clarno Highlands ecoregion is characterized by moderately to highly dissected hills and low mountains that are uniformly covered by Western ponderosa pine forest with a grass and shrub understory. Elevation varies from 3,000 to 6,200 feet (914 to 1,990 m). The region includes broad streams fed more by springs than by snow melt. The continental climate is tempered by a marine influence; it is not as dry, nor are temperature extremes as great, as in the Continental Zone Highlands. Historically, frequent low intensity wildfires reduced fuel loading in forests of widely spaced old-growth ponderosa pine. Today, after years of fire suppression and high grade logging, land managers attempt to emulate historical fire regimes to reverse the trend toward dense thickets of young growth that carry hot, stand-replacing fires.

Potential vegetation is mostly open ponderosa pine, with some Douglas-fir, western juniper, mountain-mahogany, snowberry, mountain big sagebrush, elk sedge, Idaho fescue, and bluebunch wheatgrass. Riparian areas support grand fir, mountain alder, red-twig dogwood, ninebark, Wood's rose, Rocky Mountain maple, and willows. The region covers 2,475 square miles (6,410 km^{2}) in Oregon, including parts of the Ochoco, Malheur, and Umatilla national forests and lower elevations in the Mill Creek, Bridge Creek, Black Canyon and North Fork John Day wilderness areas.

=== Maritime-Influenced Zone (11c) ===
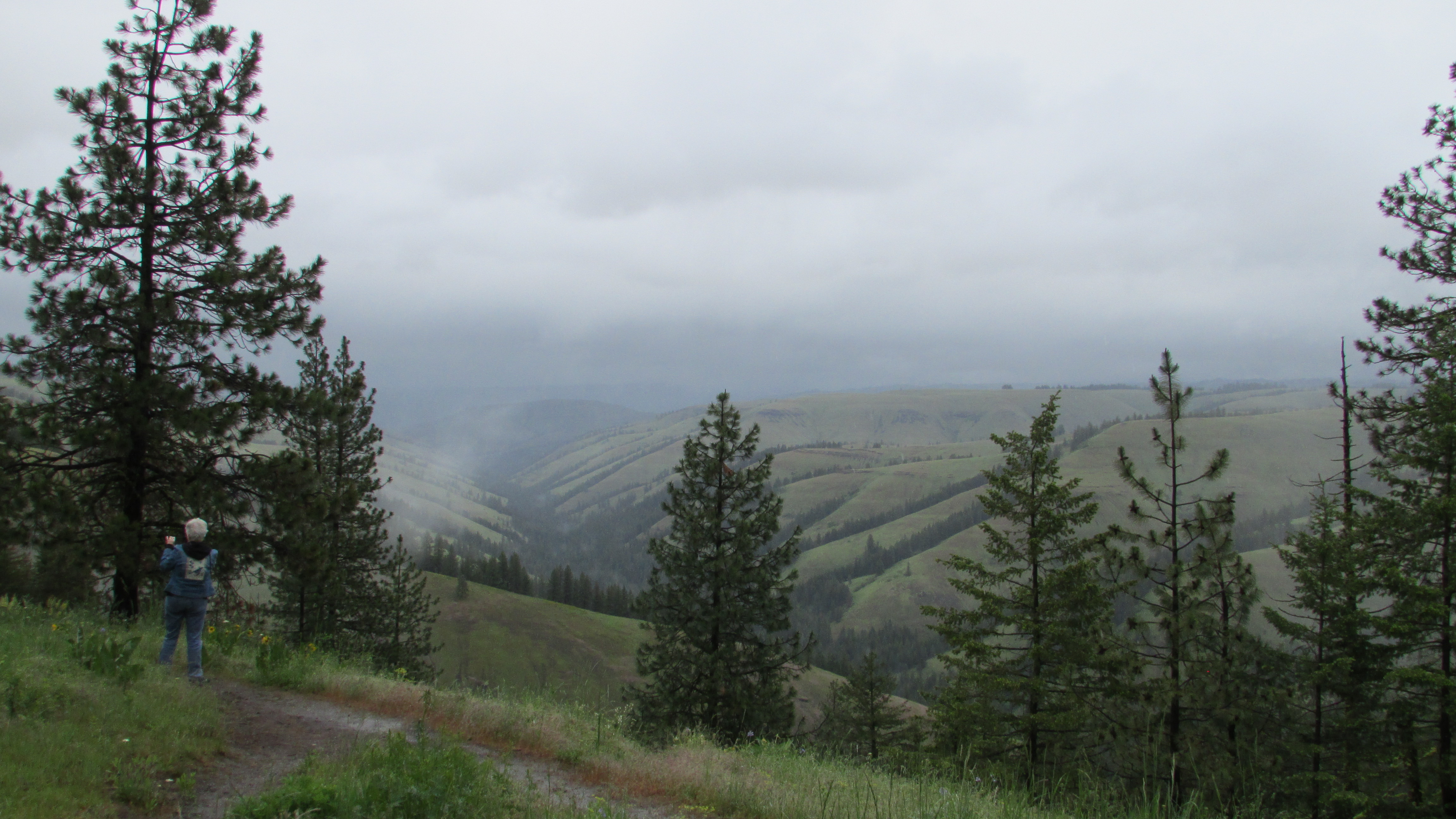
Iskuulpa Creek in Ecoregion 11c

The Maritime-Influenced Zone ecoregion is the portion of the Blue Mountains ecoregion that directly intercepts marine weather systems moving east through the Columbia River Gorge. It is characterized by a dissected, gently-sloping to hilly volcanic plateau and mountain valleys. Elevation varies from 3,000 to 6,000 feet (914 to 1,829 m). Loess and ash soils over a substrate of basalt retain sufficient moisture to support forest cover at lower elevations than elsewhere in the Blue Mountains. A dense and diverse shrub layer grows beneath the relatively open canopy of ponderosa pine and Douglas-fir, which may delay tree regeneration after logging.

Vegetation is dominated by Western ponderosa pine forests, with some Douglas-fir and grand fir. The understory and riparian shrub cover feature snowberry, spiraea, ninebark, serviceberry, and red-twig dogwood. The herbaceous ground cover features heartleaf arnica, pinegrass, elk sedge, Idaho fescue, Sandberg's bluegrass, and bluebunch wheatgrass. The region covers 1,391 square miles (3,603 km^{2}) in Oregon, as well as small areas across the border in Washington, and includes public land within the Umatilla National Forest.

=== Melange (11d) ===
The Melange ecoregion is characterized by dissected mid-elevation mountains with the complex geology typical of mélange formations. Elevation varies from 3,500 to 7,500 feet (1,067 to 2,286 m). The mountains are mostly blanketed in Tertiary basalt but have a core of mixed metamorphic, metavolcanic, metasedimentary, and sedimentary rocks. Soils are droughty and high in magnesium, creating a poor medium for plant growth; reforestation problems limit logging. Placer mining for gold altered the structure of many stream channels and left extensive tailings piles in riparian areas. Lithology affects soil, vegetation, and the quantity and quality of surface water, which vary across the region. Forests are dominated by Douglas-fir, ponderosa pine, and lodgepole pine, with subalpine fir, western larch, and grand fir; elsewhere, juniper steppe woodlands, shrublands, and grasslands are found. Understory plants include mountain-mahogany, snowberry, serviceberry, grouse huckleberry, snowberry, prince's pine, sidebells pyrola, twinflower, pinegrass, elk sedge, heartleaf arnica, Idaho fescue, and bluebunch wheatgrass.

Riparian areas support mountain alder, red-twig dogwood, prickly currant, black currant, Columbia monk's hood, and bluebells. The region covers 1,228 square miles (3,181 km^{2}) in Oregon and 285 square miles (738 km^{2}) in Idaho, including parts of the Malheur, Umatilla, and Payette national forests and lower elevations in the Strawberry Mountain, Monument Rock, and North Fork John Day Wildernesses.

=== Wallowas/Seven Devils Mountains (11e) ===
The Wallowas/Seven Devils Mountains ecoregion consists of deeply dissected mountains in the Wallowas and Seven Devil ranges. It occupies the mid-elevation zone between the Subalpine-Alpine Zone and the Continental Zone Foothills, at an elevation of 3,000 to 9,200 feet (914 to 2,804 m). Perennial streams following fault lines have eroded deep canyons. The character of the region's xeric forest varies between moister maritime-influenced and drier continental areas, particularly in the diversity and extent of the shrub understory. The region is dominated by Western ponderosa pine, lodgepole pine, Douglas-fir, and grand fir, with western larch, ninebark, snowberry, Rocky Mountain maple, serviceberry, mountain big sagebrush, low sagebrush, big huckleberry, grouse huckleberry, twinflower, prince's pine, elk sedge, and pinegrass. Higher elevations support subalpine fir. The region covers 526 square miles (1,362 km^{2}) in Oregon and 251 square miles (650 km^{2}) in Idaho, containing parts of the Wallowa-Whitman, Nez Perce, and Payette national forests.

=== Canyons and Dissected Highlands (11f) ===
The Canyons and Dissected Highlands ecoregion is characterized by steeply sloping, upper river canyons and dissected plateaus in the rain shadow of the mountains. It includes the southern Seven Devils Mountains and pieces of the uplifted Columbia Plateau, where the basalt has been eroded to a series of knife-edge ridges flanked by deep canyons. The region occupies the elevational zone above the unforested Canyons and Dissected Uplands, at an elevation of 4,000 to 6,400 feet (1,219 to 1,951 m). The steep terrain limits human activities. The region is drier than the marine-influenced Mesic Forest Zone that exists at similar elevations to the west. Moisture retaining loess and ash soils support Douglas-fir, larch, and grand fir on relatively level benches and Douglas-fir in unstable colluvial soils on steep canyon slopes. Western ponderosa pine forest is also present, with ninebark, snowberry, oceanspray, heartleaf arnica, elk sedge, Idaho fescue, bluebunch wheatgrass, and bluegrass. Riparian areas support mountain alder, stinking and prickly currant, thimbleberry, and Columbia monk's hood. The region covers 1,093 square miles (2,831 km^{2}) in Oregon, 535 square miles (1,386 km^{2}) in Idaho, and smaller areas in Washington, including parts of the Wallowa-Whitman, Nez Perce, and Payette National Forests, the Wenaha–Tucannon Wilderness, and the Hells Canyon National Recreation Area.

=== Canyons and Dissected Uplands (11g) ===
The Canyons and Dissected Uplands ecoregion is characterized by deep river canyons and dissected plateaus at an elevation of 1,000 to 5,000 feet (304 to 1,524 m). The Snake, Grand Ronde, Imnaha, and Salmon river canyons have cut through the Columbia Plateau to depths of 2,000 to 5,000 feet (610 to 1,524 m). Basalt and metamorphosed rocks are typically exposed in the canyon walls; the rock assemblage differs from the basalts of the Lower Snake and Clearwater Canyons in the Columbia Plateau ecoregion. The canyons provide a refuge for elk, bighorn sheep, mountain goats, and a concentration of wintering bald eagles. Of the major historic Snake River salmon stocks, the coho and sockeye are extinct, the chinook are threatened, and summer steelhead are in decline. The depth of the canyons and the exposed metamorphic rocks result in stony soils on canyon slopes that retain little moisture. Lower north-facing slopes and upper south-facing slopes support Douglas-fir, ponderosa pine, and Idaho fescue. Lower south-facing slopes support bluebunch wheatgrass and arrowleaf balsamroot.

Upper north-facing slopes support grand fir, ninebark, and pinegrass. Overgrazed areas are dominated by cheatgrass and exotic annuals. Riparian areas in the Snake River canyons feature hackberry and bluebunch wheatgrass. The tributary canyons feature mockorange, poison-ivy, red-twig dogwood, snowberry, and Rocky Mountain maple. The region covers 1,091 square miles (2,826 km^{2}) in Oregon, 859 square miles (2,225 km^{2}) in Idaho, and smaller areas in Washington, including much of the Hells Canyon National Recreation Area and parts of the Wallowa-Whitman, Payette, and Nez Perce national forests.

=== Continental Zone Highlands (11h) ===
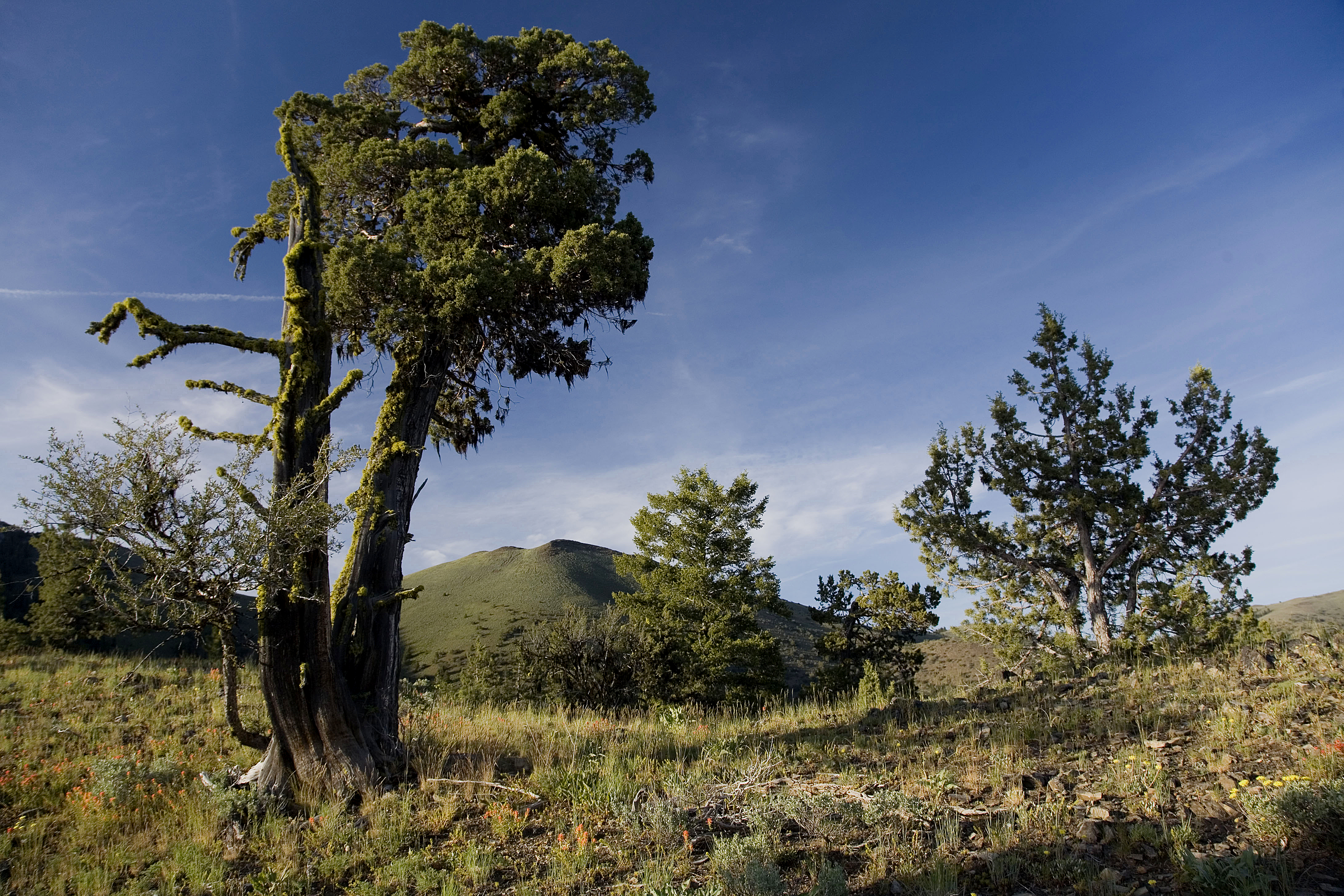
Bristlecone pines in the Malheur National Forest.

The Continental Zone Highlands ecoregion is a moderately dissected, mountainous volcanic plateau, with scattered cinder cones, at an elevation of 4,000 to 6,700 feet (1,219 to 2,042 m). The region experiences seasonal temperature extremes and low annual precipitation. Many of its perennial streams flow south to end in the alkaline basins of the High Desert Wetlands of the Northern Basin and Range ecoregion.

Frequent wildfires once influenced the open character of the forest. The predominant forest cover is ponderosa pine with a shrub or bunchgrass understory; the region lacks a zone of true firs found in other highland areas in the Blue Mountains. Characteristic species include ponderosa pine, Douglas-fir, grand fir, juniper, antelope bitterbrush, snowberry, mountain-mahogany, mountain big sagebrush, stiff sagebrush, elk sedge, pinegrass, bluebunch wheatgrass, and Idaho fescue. The region covers 1,555 square miles (4,027 km^{2}) in Oregon, including parts of the Ochoco and Malheur National Forests.

=== Continental Zone Foothills (11i) ===
The Continental Zone Foothills ecoregion consists of foothills, hills, and scattered buttes lying between Oregon's Blue and Wallowa mountains and the northwestern Snake River Plain, at an elevation of 1,800 to 6,600 feet (550 to 2,010 m). The combined masses of the Cascade Range and the Blue and Wallowa mountains block any maritime influence, creating a continental climate. As a result, plants are subject to wide temperature ranges, high evapotranspiration, and high early-season moisture stress. The distribution of desert shrubs varies with soil depth, texture, and elevation. The sagebrush steppe features mountain-mahogany, bitterbrush, bluebunch wheatgrass, mountain big sagebrush, Idaho fescue, Wyoming big sagebrush, Sandberg bluegrass, and, on schist, Nevada greasebush. Scattered Douglas-fir and ponderosa pine forests also occur.

The region provides important wildlife habitat. Mountain-mahogany and bitterbrush provide winter cover and forage for mule deer. Rodents, songbirds, and upland game birds also use the fruits of bitterbrush. The second largest of the Blue Mountains subregions, the Continental Zone Foothills is located in the easternmost part of the region, covering 3,715 square miles (9,622 km^{2}) in Oregon and 591 square miles (1,531 km^{2}) in Idaho.

=== Blue Mountain Basins (11k) ===
The Blue Mountain Basins ecoregion is characterized by flat to rolling alluvial valleys containing floodplains, fluvial terraces, and scattered buttes in the Wallowa, Grande Ronde, and Baker valleys. The Wallowa Valley also includes outwash terraces, moraines, and a low elevation basalt plateau. Elevation varies from 2,600 to 5,000 feet (792 to 1,524 m). All three valleys are faultbounded grabens or depressions filled with sediments. The Wallowa and Grande Ronde valleys have a marine-moderated climate and moisture-retaining loess soils. The Baker Valley, located in the rain shadow of the Elkhorn Mountains, is drier and has areas of alkaline soil. All three valleys receive stream flow from the surrounding mountains. Most of the floodplain wetlands have been drained for agriculture, but a remnant exists in the Grande Ronde Basin at the Ladd Marsh state wildlife area. The Baker Valley features sagebrush steppe composed of Wyoming big sagebrush, bluebunch wheatgrass, and Idaho fescue. The Wallowa and Grande Ronde valleys features grassland containing bluebunch wheatgrass and Idaho fescue. Wetlands support tufted hairgrass, sedges, basin wildrye, and black greasewood. The region covers 1,984 square miles (5,139 km^{2}) in Oregon, along the I-84 corridor between La Grande and Baker City and in the Wallowa Valley near Enterprise.

=== Mesic Forest Zone (11l) ===
The disjunct Mesic Forest Zone ecoregion is characterized by a dissected, volcanic plateau and mid-elevation mountains containing the highest forested areas in the Blue Mountains, western Wallowa Mountains, and western Seven Devils Mountains. Elevation varies from 4,000 to 7,700 feet (1,219 to 2,347 m). The climate is influenced by maritime air traveling up the Columbia River Gorge, with higher precipitation than other forested regions in the Blue Mountains. Snow persists late into the spring. The ashy soil holds moisture during the dry season and supports a productive spruce-fir forest. The region's boundaries correspond to the distribution of true fir forest before the modern era of fire suppression and high grade logging. Cold slopes feature subalpine fir, Engelmann spruce, mountain hemlock, lodgepole pine, big huckleberry, grouse huckleberry, Utah honeysuckle, sidebells pyrola, roundleaved violet, and northwestern sedge.

Cool moist slopes feature grand fir, western larch, queen's cup beadlily, and prince's pine. Drier slopes feature Douglas-fir, ponderosa pine, Rocky Mountain maple, ninebark, pinegrass, elk sedge, and bigleaf sandwort. Lower, drier sites support ponderosa pine. The region covers 2,226 square miles (5,765 km^{2}) in Oregon, 47 square miles (122 km^{2}) in Idaho, and small areas in Washington, including parts of the Malheur, Ochoco, Umatilla, and Wallowa-Whitman national forests, and significant portions of the Mill Creek, Bridge Creek, Black Canyon, Monument Rock, North Fork John Day, North Fork Umatilla, and Eagle Cap wildernesses.

=== Subalpine-Alpine Zone (11m) ===
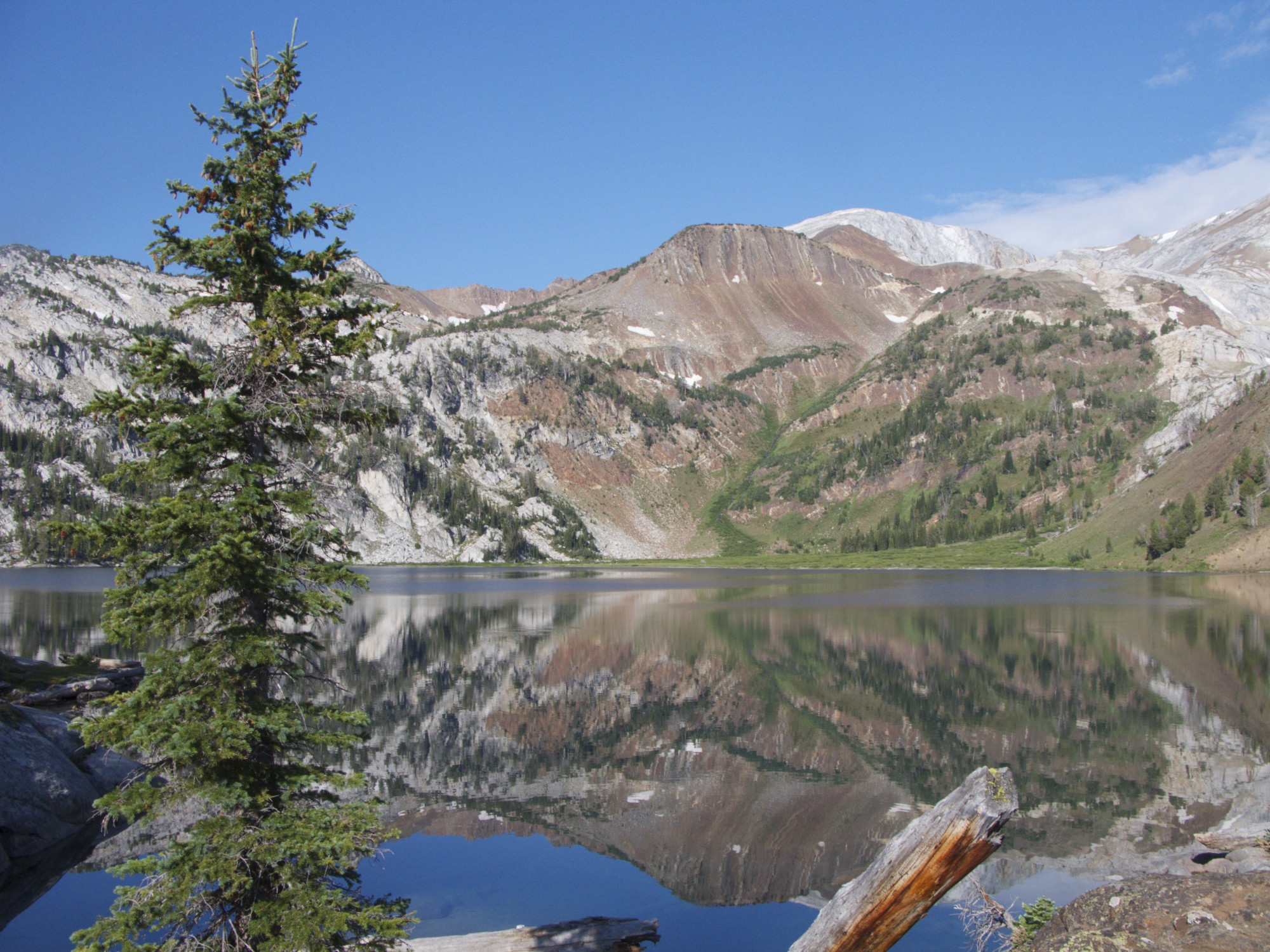
The slopes of Sacajawea Peak lie in the subalpine and alpine zones.

The Subalpine-Alpine Zone ecoregion includes high elevation, glaciated mountains with arêtes, cirques, and tarns. High gradient streams have boulder and cobble substrates. Elevation varies from 6,500 to 9,900 feet (1,981 to 3,018 m). The region begins where the forest cover becomes broken by alpine meadows and continues through alpine meadowland to include the exposed rock, permanent snowfields, and glacial ice of the highest mountain peaks. Very open forests of subalpine fir, Engelmann spruce, and whitebark pine tolerate the cold soils, deep snowpack, and extremely short growing season near timberline. Dry south-facing slopes support mountain big sagebrush and Idaho fescue. At the treeline, krummholz is found. Wet meadows support heather and Parry's rush.

Historically, green fescue and sedges covered high alpine meadows and ridges, particularly in the Wallowas; but, following intense sheep grazing in the early twentieth century, many alpine plant associations reverted to seral or exotic species on rocky subsoil. The region covers 540 square miles (1,399 km^{2}) Oregon, in the heart of the Eagle Cap and Strawberry Mountain Wildernesses, and 71 square miles (184 km^{2}) in Idaho, in the Payette National Forest.

=== Deschutes River Valley (11n) ===
The Deschutes River Valley ecoregion, named for the Deschutes River, which it partially contains, is a broad valley with deeply incised streams. The southern part is capped by basalt and nearly level. In the northern part, the basalt cap is absent, and the terrain is more rolling and dissected. Elevation varies from 2,000 to 4,000 feet (610 to 1,219 m), with buttes as high as 5,300 feet (1,615 m). The climate has a marine influence, and the region is less arid than the botanically similar High Lava Plains of the Northern Basin and Range ecoregion to the southeast. Because of the proximity of the High Cascades, stream density and water availability are high. As a result, human population density is much higher than in the High Lava Plains. Canals carry river water to irrigated farms on floodplains and terraces growing grass seed, winter wheat, potatoes, alfalfa, mint, onions, carrots for seed, and garlic.

Potential natural vegetation includes Wyoming big sagebrush, antelope bitterbrush, basin big sagebrush, mountain big sagebrush, bluebunch wheatgrass, Idaho fescue, and needle-and-thread on the sagebrush steppe, with western juniper on shallow, rocky soils. Riparian areas support white alder, black hawthorn, ponderosa pine, and juniper. Himalayan blackberry, reed canary grass, and sweet clover are introduced species. The region covers 1,576 square miles (4,082 km^{2}) along the Deschutes and Crooked rivers in Oregon, in a triangle defined roughly by Warm Springs, Prineville, and Bend. It includes parts of the Warm Springs Indian Reservation and the Crooked River National Grassland.

=== Cold Basins (11o) ===
The Cold Basins ecoregion contains cold, wet valleys and basins and wet meadows at an elevation of 3,600 to 6,000 feet (1,097 to 1,829 m). The high meadows are often alluvial and have a high water table and silt or clay soils. Streams, if not channelized, are meandering and have a dynamic interaction with their flood plains. These unconstrained streams provide pool habitats that are important to salmonids. The short growing season and saturated soil make these basins unsuitable for most crops, except hay, but they are heavily grazed by cattle and elk. Potential natural vegetation includes sedges, mountain big sagebrush, low sagebrush, and Idaho fescue on the sagebrush steppe and tufted hairgrass, Baltic rush, and alien Kentucky bluegrass in the wetlands and wet meadows. The smallest of the Blue Mountains subregions, the Cold Basins covers 400 square miles (1,036 km^{2}) in several disjunct areas in central and eastern Oregon.

== See also ==
- Ecoregions defined by the EPA and the Commission for Environmental Cooperation:
  - List of ecoregions in North America (CEC)
  - List of ecoregions in the United States (EPA)
  - List of ecoregions in Oregon
  - List of ecoregions in Idaho
  - List of ecoregions in Washington
- The conservation group World Wildlife Fund maintains an alternate classification system:
  - List of ecoregions (WWF)
  - List of ecoregions in the United States (WWF)
