= List of ecoregions in Oregon =

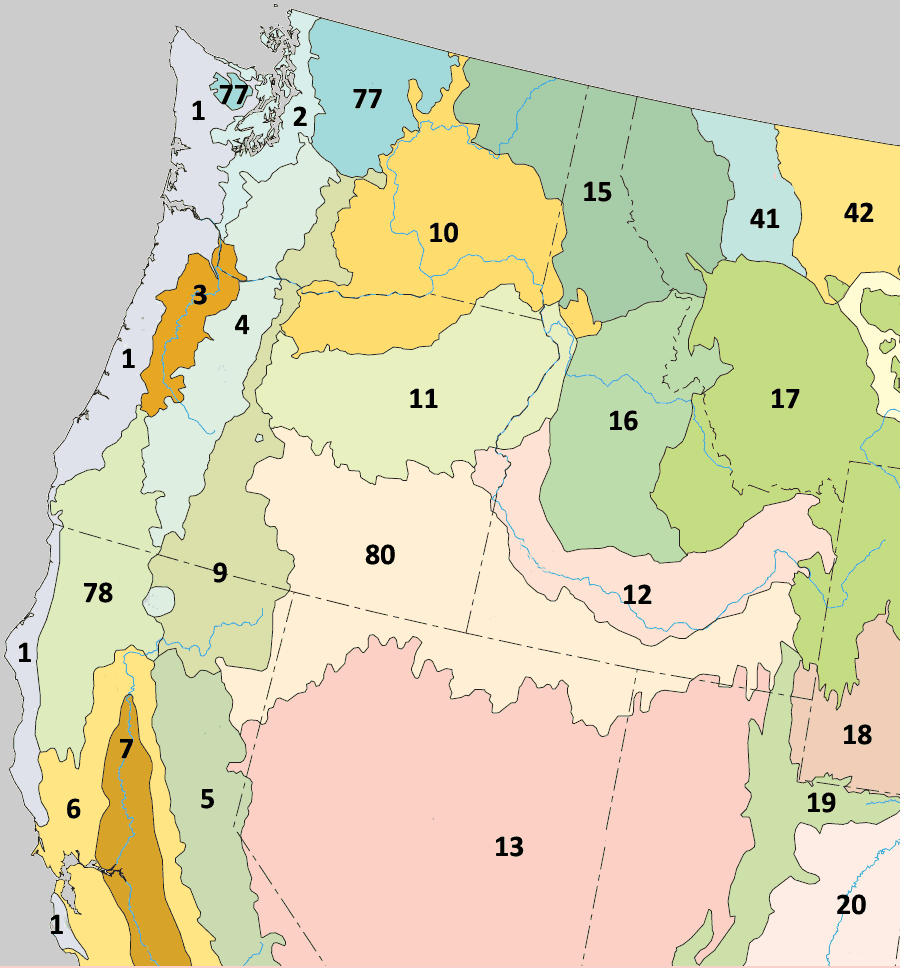
The level III ecoregions in Oregon are the Coast Range (1), Willamette Valley (3), Cascades (4), Eastern Cascades Slopes and Foothills (9), Columbia Plateau (10), Blue Mountains (11), Snake River Plain (12), Klamath Mountains (78), and Northern Basin and Range (80). (Compare to map of Level IV ecoregions.)

This list of ecoregions in Oregon provides an overview of ecoregions in the U.S. state of Oregon designated by the U.S. Environmental Protection Agency (EPA) and the Commission for Environmental Cooperation (CEC). The Commission's 1997 report, Ecological Regions of North America, provides a spatial framework that may be used by government agencies, non-governmental organizations, and academic researchers as a basis for risk analysis, resource management, and environmental study of the continent's ecosystems. Ecoregions may be identified by similarities in geology, physiography, vegetation, climate, soils, land use, wildlife distributions, and hydrology.

The classification system has four levels. Levels I, III, and IV are shown on this list. Level I divides North America into 15 ecoregions; of these, 3 are present in Oregon. Level III subdivides the continent into 182 ecoregions; of these, 9 lay partly within Oregon's borders. Level IV is a further subdivision of Level III ecoregions. There are 65 Level IV ecoregions in Oregon, many of which continue into adjacent areas in the neighboring states of Washington, Idaho, Nevada, and California. The task of defining and mapping these ecoregions was carried out by the Oregon Ecoregion Project, a collaborative effort involving the EPA, the United States Geological Survey (USGS), the United States Forest Service (USFS), and other state and federal agencies. The new classification system they developed may differ from previous frameworks developed separately by the agencies.

Oregon is ecologically diverse. The west side of the state has a marine-influenced climate and receives plentiful precipitation three seasons of the year. In contrast, Eastern Oregon lies in the rain shadow of the Cascades and is much drier. The climatic gradient is evident in the state's landscapes: forested mountains, glaciated peaks, shrub- and grass-covered plains, agricultural valleys, beaches, desert playas, and wetlands.

== Marine West Coast Forest ==
=== 1 Coast Range ===
- 1a Coastal Lowlands
- 1b Coastal Uplands
- 1d Volcanics
- 1f Willapa Hills
- 1g Mid-Coastal Sedimentary
- 1h Southern Oregon Coastal Mountains
- 1i Redwood Zone

=== 3 Willamette Valley ===
- 3a Portland/Vancouver Basin
- 3b Willamette River and Tributaries Gallery Forest
- 3c Prairie Terraces
- 3d Valley Foothills

== Northwest Forested Mountains ==
=== 4 Cascades ===
- 4a Western Cascades Lowlands and Valleys
- 4b Western Cascades Montane Highlands
- 4c Cascade Crest Montane Forest
- 4d Cascade Subalpine/Alpine
- 4e High Southern Cascades Montane Forest
- 4f Southern Cascades

=== 9 Eastern Cascades Slopes and Foothills ===
- 9b Grand Fir Mixed Forest
- 9c Oak/Conifer Foothills
- 9d Ponderosa Pine/Bitterbrush Woodland
- 9e Pumice Plateau
- 9f Pumice Plateau Basins
- 9g Klamath/Goose Lake Basins
- 9h Fremont Pine/Fir Forest
- 9i Southern Cascades Slope
- 9j Klamath Juniper Woodland

=== 11 Blue Mountains ===
- 11a John Day/Clarno Uplands
- 11b John Day/Clarno Highlands
- 11c Maritime-Influenced Zone
- 11d Melange
- 11e Wallowas/Seven Devils Mountains
- 11f Canyons and Dissected Highlands
- 11g Canyons and Dissected Uplands
- 11h Continental Zone Highlands
- 11i Continental Zone Foothills
- 11k Blue Mountain Basins
- 11l Mesic Forest Zone
- 11m Subalpine–Alpine Zone
- 11n Deschutes River Valley
- 11o Cold Basins

=== 78 Klamath Mountains ===
- 78a Rogue/Illinois Valleys
- 78b Oak Savanna Foothills
- 78c Umpqua Interior Foothills
- 78d Serpentine Siskiyous
- 78e Inland Siskiyous
- 78f Coastal Siskiyous
- 78g Klamath River Ridges

== North American Deserts ==
=== 10 Columbia Plateau ===
- 10c Umatilla Plateau
- 10e Pleistocene Lake Basins
- 10g Yakima Folds
- 10i Deep Loess Foothills
- 10k Deschutes/John Day Canyons
- 10n Umatilla Dissected Uplands

=== 12 Snake River Plain ===
- 12a Treasure Valley
- 12j Unwooded Alkaline Foothills

=== 80 Northern Basin and Range ===
- 80a Dissected High Lava Plateau
- 80d Pluvial Lake Basins
- 80e High Desert Wetlands
- 80f Owyhee Uplands and Canyons
- 80g High Lava Plains
- 80j Semiarid Uplands
- 80k Partly Forested Mountains
- 80l Salt Shrub Valleys
- 80m Barren Playas
