= Snake River Plain (ecoregion) =

Ecoregion in the northwestern United States

Snake River Plain ecoregion
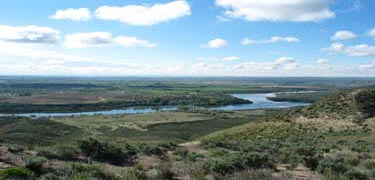
- The Snake River

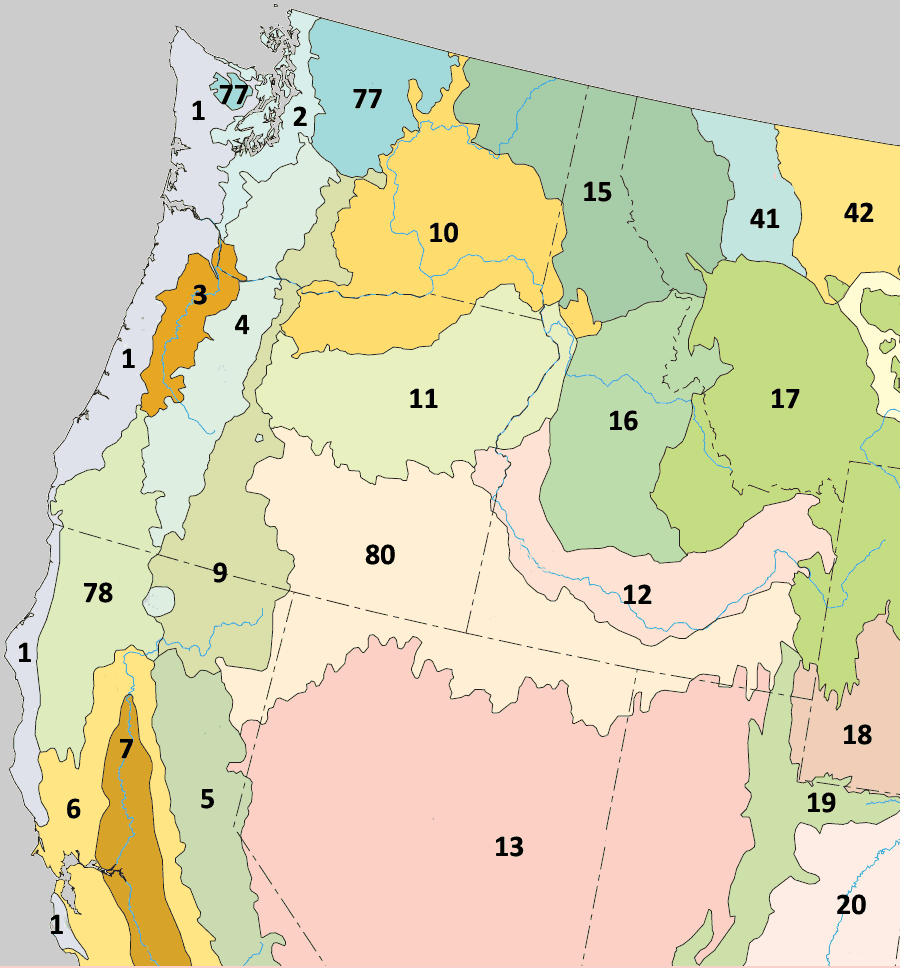
- Snake River Plain (12)

Ecology
- Realm: Nearctic
- Borders: Blue Mountains (11); Idaho Batholith (16); Middle Rockies (17); Northern Basin and Range (80)

Geography
- Country: United States
- States: Idaho; Oregon
- Coordinates: 43.0°N 114.0°W

The Snake River Plain ecoregion is a Level III ecoregion designated by the United States Environmental Protection Agency (EPA) in the U.S. states of Idaho and Oregon. It follows the Snake River across Idaho, stretching roughly 400 miles (640 km) from the Wyoming border to Eastern Oregon in the xeric intermontane west. Characterized by plains and low hills, it is considerably lower and less rugged than surrounding ecoregions. Many of the alluvial valleys bordering the Snake River are used for agriculture. Where irrigation water and soil depth are sufficient, sugar beets, potatoes, alfalfa, small grains, and vegetables are grown. Elsewhere, livestock grazing is widespread. Cattle feedlots and dairy operations are found locally.

Potential natural vegetation is mostly sagebrush steppe, but barren lava fields and saltbush-greasewood associations also occur. Streams generally have lower gradients, are warmer, and have finer grained substrates than do streams in the montane ecoregions. Natural fish assemblages in the region are typically a mix of mesothermal minnows and suckers, but some stenothermal salmonids and sculpins are also present. The region has many large springs along the Snake River that support endemic fish and mollusc species. Shoshone Falls is a major zoogeographic barrier, and different species occur above and below it.

The Snake River Plain ecoregion has been subdivided into ten Level IV ecoregions, as described below.

== Level IV ecoregions ==
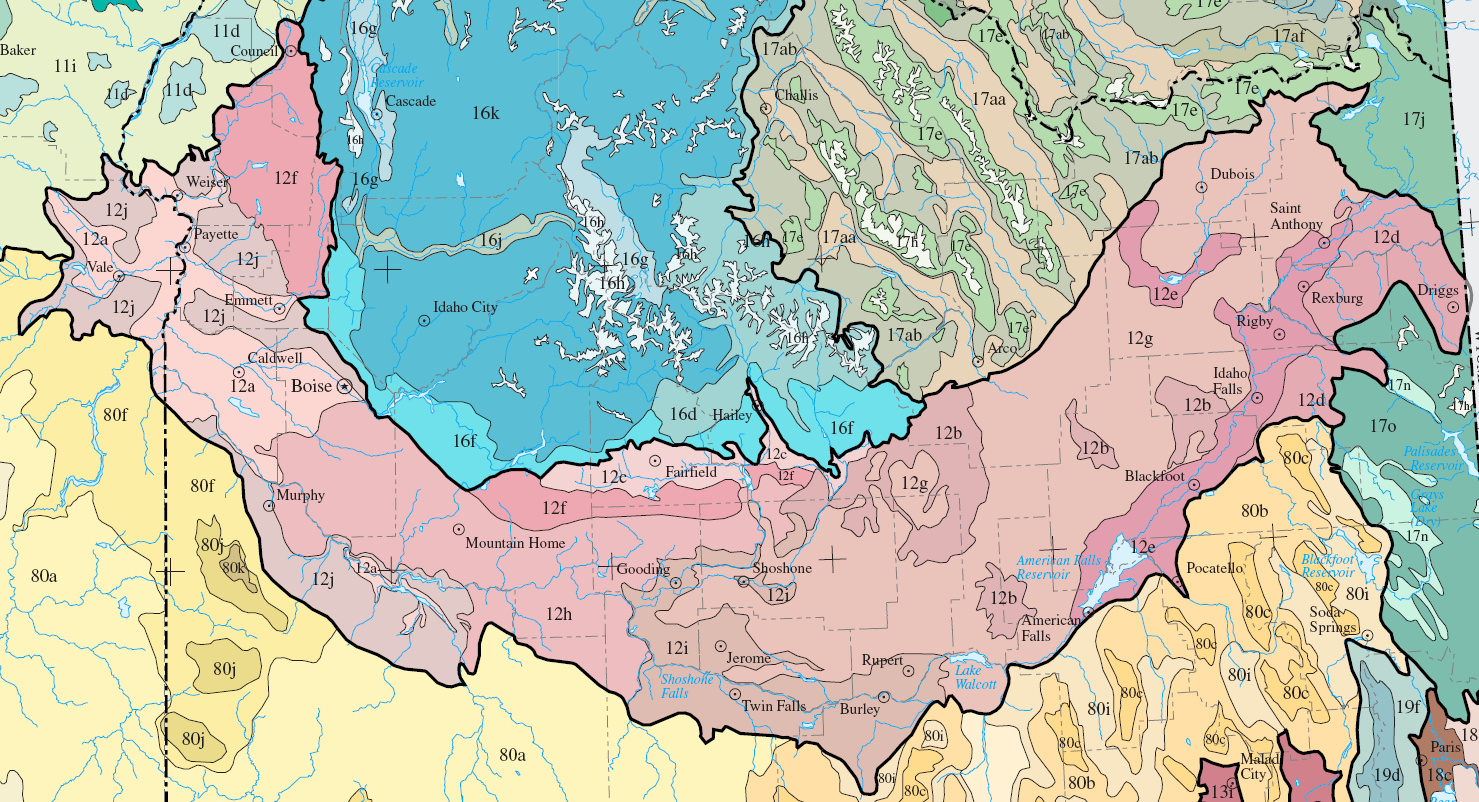
Level IV ecoregions in the Snake River Plain. (Full map).

=== Treasure Valley (12a) ===
The Treasure Valley ecoregion (named for the Treasure Valley) is an unglaciated rolling valley containing many canals and incised rivers. Elevation varies from 2,000 to 2,800 feet (640 to 853 m). The valley is underlain by Quaternary alluvium, loess, lacustrine, and alluvial fan deposits. Soils have an aridic moisture regime, and they originally supported sagebrush-grassland before the valley was converted to agriculture. Canals and diversions in this portion of the Snake River Plain supply water to pastureland and cropland as well as municipalities. Surface water quality has been significantly affected by channel alteration, dams, irrigation diversions, irrigation return flow, and agricultural pollution. Crops include wheat, sugar beets, alfalfa, potatoes, and onions. Population density is greater than in neighboring, rangeland-dominated ecoregions. Crop diversity is greater, temperatures are warmer, and the mean frost-free season is longer than in the Upper Snake River Plain and the Magic Valley. Vegetation outside of agricultural areas is characterized by Wyoming big sagebrush, basin big sagebrush, bluebunch wheatgrass, bluegrass, basin wildrye, Thurber's needlegrass, rabbitbrush, and cheatgrass. In saline areas, shadscale, greasewood, and saltgrass occur. The region covers 1,302 square miles (3,372 km^{2}) in Idaho and 499 sq mi (1,292 km^{2}) in Oregon, where the Payette, Boise, Weiser, Malheur and Owyhee rivers converge into the Snake. It includes lowland areas from Boise to Vale and contains the Deer Flat National Wildlife Refuge.

=== Lava Fields (12b) ===
The Lava Fields ecoregion contains basalt flows, cinder cones, and spatter cones rising from irregular plains, at an elevation of 3,800 to 5,500 ft (1,158 to 1,676 m). Exposed basalt or very shallow loessial soils over volcanics are characteristic. Surface water availability is extremely limited, and the region is either barren or sparsely covered by hardy shrubs and grasses, including basin sagebrush, mountain sagebrush, Wyoming big sagebrush, rabbitbrush, bluegrass, bluebunch wheatgrass, bottlebrush squirreltail, Thurber needlegrass, and Indian ricegrass. Livestock carrying capacity is low. The region covers 1,122 sq mi (2,906 km^{2}) in Idaho in pockets of the eastern Snake River Plain, including Craters of the Moon National Monument and parts of the Idaho National Laboratory.

=== Camas Prairie (12c) ===
The Camas Prairie ecoregion is a cold, wet valley containing nearly level to rolling terraces, bottomlands, basalt plains, and, on the periphery, alluvial fans. Elevation varies from 4,700 to 5,100 ft (1,443 to 1,554 m). It is flanked by the semi-arid foothills of the Snake River Plain and the Idaho Batholith, which trap mountain runoff on the prairie. Resultant wet soils and flooding occur and are local and seasonal problems. Frigid mollisols are common and are colder than the soils of the lower Treasure Valley. Wet bottomlands support rushes, sedges, meadow grasses, and willows. Alluvial fans and terraces are covered by bluebunch wheatgrass, Idaho fescue, bluegrass, basin big sagebrush, and mountain sagebrush. Lava plains support alkali sagebrush, bluegrass, squirreltail, and Idaho fescue. The region covers 530 sq mi (1,373 km^{2}) in Idaho along the Camas River and is used for small grain and alfalfa farming, pasture, range, and wildlife habitat.

=== Dissected Plateaus and Teton Basin (12d) ===
The Dissected Plateaus and Teton Basin ecoregion is characterized by dissected plateaus, alluvial fans, low terraces, bottomlands, outwash plains, and nearly flat, poorly drained basins. Elevation varies from 4,700 to 6,300 ft (1,443 to 1,920 m). Mollisols developed in thick loess deposits or alluvium and are subject to wind erosion. Loess is far more extensive than in the Upper Snake River Plain subregion. Sprinkler-irrigated land supports potatoes, alfalfa, and pasture; however, surface irrigation is far less common than in the Upper Snake River Plain. Non-irrigated land grows small grains. Potential natural vegetation is sagebrush steppe, with mountain big sagebrush, threetip sagebrush, bluebunch wheatgrass, bluegrass, Idaho fescue, and cheatgrass. Wet meadows occur in the poorly drained, relatively cold Teton Basin. The region covers 1,059 sq mi (2,743 km^{2}) in Idaho in the farthest eastern reaches of the Snake River Plain, approaching the Teton Mountains. It includes portions of the Caribou-Targhee National Forest.

=== Upper Snake River Plain (12e) ===
The Upper Snake River Plain ecoregion is characterized by nearly level river terraces, floodplains, and lake plains containing many canals and rivers. Elevation varies from 4,400 to 5,000 ft (1,341 to 1,524 m). The region is primarily used for irrigated cropland, pastureland, suburban and urban developments, and industrial areas, and aquatic resources have been degraded by irrigation diversions, channelization, dams, sewage treatment, nonpoint pollution, food processing, and phosphate processing. Extensive surface-irrigated small grain, sugar beet, potato, and alfalfa farming occurs. The frost-free season is shorter and crops are less varied than in agricultural areas downstream. Potential natural vegetation is sagebrush steppe, with saltbush-greasewood communities in the southwest. Big sagebrush, bluebunch wheatgrass, bluegrass, cheatgrass, rabbitbrush, squirreltail, needle-and-thread, Indian ricegrass, and fourwing saltbush are present. Riparian areas feature sedges, perennial grasses, willows, and cottonwood. The region covers 1,463 square miles (3,789 km^{2}) in eastern Idaho, mostly along the interstate corridor from American Falls to St. Anthony. It includes the Camas National Wildlife Refuge and most of the Fort Hall Indian Reservation.

=== Semiarid Foothills (12f) ===
The Semiarid Foothills ecoregion consists of foothills, alluvial fans, hills, and valleys that separate the Snake River Plain from the Idaho Batholith ecoregion to the north. At an elevation of 2,900 to 6,500 feet (884 to 1,981 m), it is higher and more rugged than neighboring regions in the Snake River Plain. Shallow, clayey soils are common, supporting sagebrush steppe communities of bluebunch wheatgrass, bluegrass, Idaho fescue, big sagebrush, bitterbrush, medusahead wildrye, and cheatgrass, with bunch grasses, sedges, rushes, and clovers in wetter areas. Land use is primarily livestock grazing and is distinct from the irrigated agriculture of the Treasure Valley. Wildfire frequency is high. The region covers 1,559 square miles (4,038 km^{2}) in two separate areas of Idaho, one northeast of Weiser in the Weiser River drainage and one northeast of Mountain Home, including Bennett Mountain and nearby hills.

=== Eastern Snake River Basalt Plains (12g) ===
The Eastern Snake River Basalt Plains ecoregion is a large irregular plain at an elevation of 3,700 to 6,400 ft (1,128 to 1,951 m), with shallow, stony soils that are unsuitable for cultivation. Only small areas have soils deep enough to be farmed under sprinkler irrigation. Rangeland is widespread and contrasts with the cropland of other subregions in the Snake River Plain. Potential natural vegetation is mostly sagebrush and bunchgrass, with basin and Wyoming big sagebrush, Thurber needlegrass, Indian ricegrass, bitterbrush, bluegrass, and cheatgrass. Saline areas feature fourwing saltbush, shadscale, and winter fat. The region is cool enough to have some regeneration capacity and still contains native plants, unlike the Mountain Home Uplands to the west. By far the largest of the Snake River Plain subregions, it covers 6,426 square miles (16,643 km^{2}) in southern Idaho, including part of the Craters of the Moon National Monument and Idaho National Engineering Laboratory.

=== Mountain Home Uplands (12h) ===
The Mountain Home Uplands ecoregion consists of arid, shrub- and grass-covered plains with hills and basalt-capped buttes. Elevation varies from 2,500 to 4,300 ft (762 to 1,311 m), with some buttes up to 5,000 ft (1,524 m). It is mostly rangeland and is sparsely populated, unlike regions to the west and east. It is flanked by foothills to the north and south and by the Magic and Treasure Valleys to the east and west. Today, it supports cheatgrass, crested wheatgrass, medusahead wildrye, Wyoming and basin big sagebrush, alkali sagebrush, and antelope bitterbrush. Stock carrying capacity is low. Native grasses are much rarer and vegetative regeneration capacity is more limited than in the cooler Eastern Snake River Basalt Plains, which has more available moisture. The second largest of the Snake River Plain subregions, it covers 2,945 square miles (7,628 km^{2}) in southern Idaho, along the I-84 corridor between Boise and Gooding.

=== Magic Valley (12i) ===
The Magic Valley ecoregion, named for the irrigation canals of the Magic Valley that "magically" transformed the region in the early 1900s, is an agricultural valley underlain by alluvium, loess, and basalt flows. Elevation varies from 3,200 to 4,500 ft (975 to 1,372 m). The aridic soils require irrigation to grow commercial crops. Many canals, reservoirs, and diversions supply water to the region's pastureland, cropland, and residential, commercial, and industrial developments. Small grains, alfalfa, sugar beets, potatoes, and beans are grown. Livestock and dairy farms occur; dairying is more common than in the Treasure Valley. Dams, irrigation diversions, pollution, and channel alteration have affected water quality, and over-watering from sprinkler-irrigated portions of the Eastern Snake River Basalt Plains has raised groundwater levels and created artificial wetlands. Natural vegetation is mostly sagebrush and bunchgrass, but low terraces have salt tolerant plants. Wyoming and basin big sagebrush, alkali sagebrush, bluebunch wheatgrass, Thurber needlegrass, squirreltail, bluegrass, needle-and-thread, Indian ricegrass, and fourwing saltbush are present. Population density is greater than in the rangeland-dominated regions to the east and west. The region covers 1,700 sq mi (4,403 km^{2}) in the Twin Falls area of southern Idaho.

=== Unwooded Alkaline Foothills (12j) ===
The Unwooded Alkaline Foothills ecoregion contains rolling foothills, hills, benches, alluvial fans, and scattered badlands that are characteristically underlain by sandy, alkaline lacustrine deposits. Perennial streams are rare. At an elevation of 2,100 to 2,600 ft (671 to 1,189 m), the terrain is higher and more rugged than the neighboring Treasure Valley. The region is valuable as rangeland and wildlife habitat, and land use is generally distinct from the irrigated agriculture of the valley. However, scattered areas near rivers with enough water to leach salts from the soil support alfalfa or sugar beet farming. Natural vegetation is dominated by Wyoming big sagebrush and associated grasses, such as bluebunch wheatgrass, Sandberg bluegrass, Thurber needlegrass, and Indian ricegrass. Today, cheatgrass and crested wheatgrass are also common. Salt tolerant shrubs, including black greasewood, fourwing saltbush, inland saltgrass, shadscale, seepweed, occur on alkaline outcrops. The region covers 1,598 sq mi (4,139 km^{2}) in western Idaho and 489 sq mi (1,267 km^{2}) in eastern Oregon, on both sides of the Treasure Valley.

== See also ==
- Ecoregions defined by the EPA and the Commission for Environmental Cooperation:
  - List of ecoregions in North America (CEC)
  - List of ecoregions in the United States (EPA)
  - List of ecoregions in Idaho
  - List of ecoregions in Oregon
- The conservation group World Wildlife Fund maintains an alternate classification system:
  - List of ecoregions (WWF)
  - List of ecoregions in the United States (WWF)
