= Idaho Batholith ecoregion =

Ecoregion in Idaho and Montana, United States

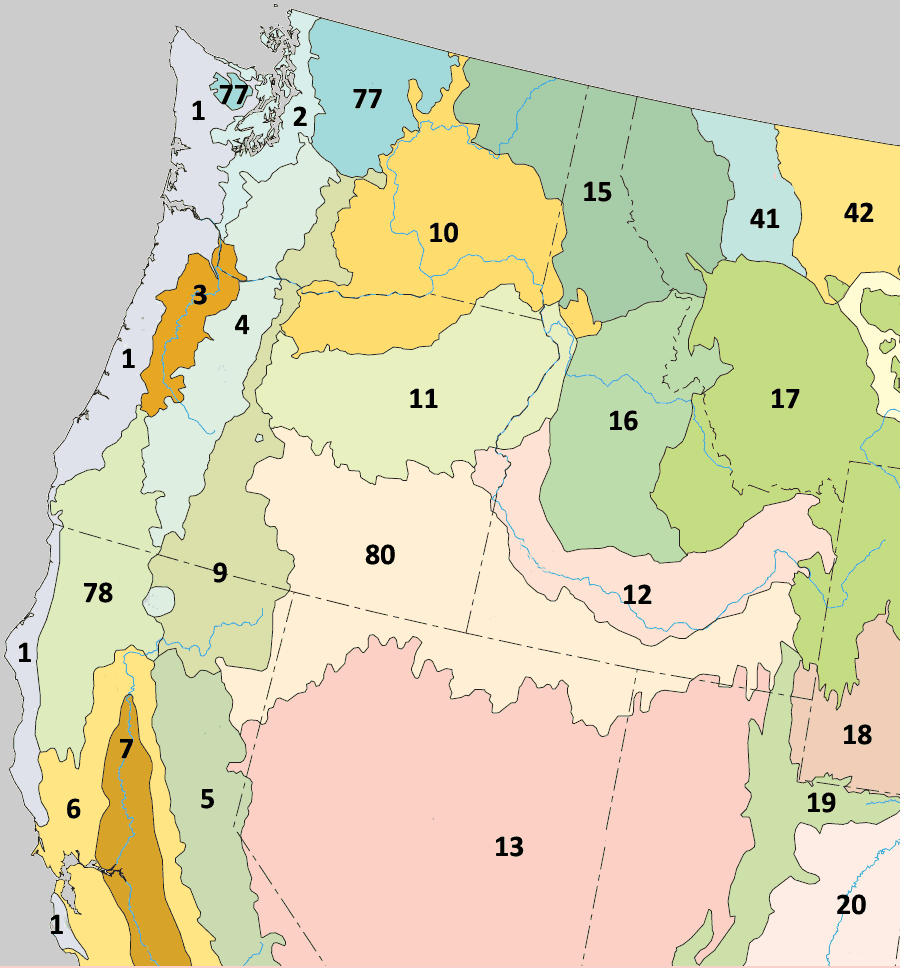
- Idaho Batholith Ecoregion (16) and surrounding ecoregions

Ecology
- Realm: Nearctic
- Borders: List: North Central Rockies forests; Montana valley and foothill grasslands; Snake River Plain (12); Blue Mountains (11); Columbia Plateau (10)

Geography
- States: Idaho; Montana

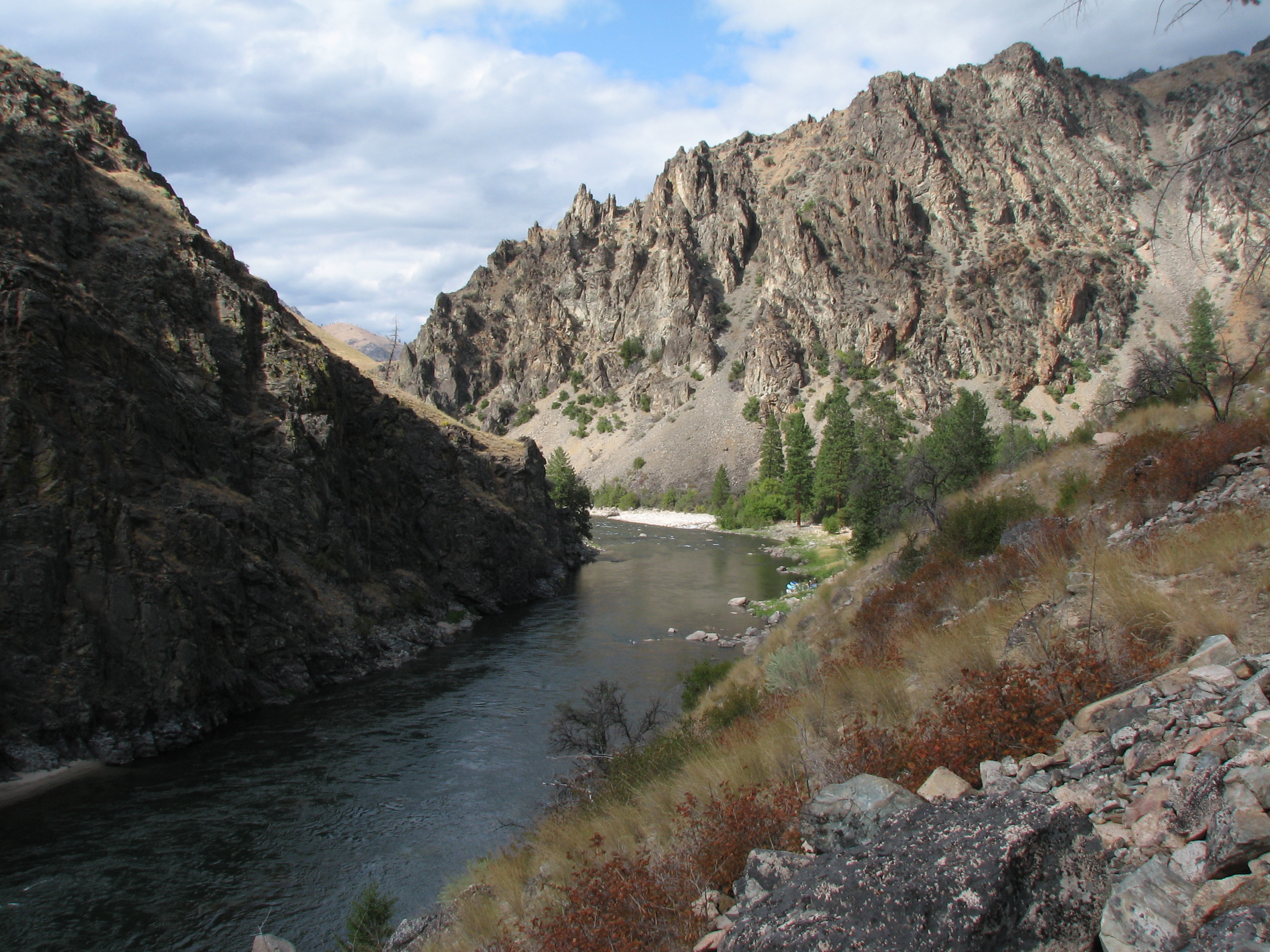
Salmon River

The Idaho Batholith ecoregion is a Level III ecoregion designated by the United States Environmental Protection Agency (EPA) in the U.S. states of Idaho and Montana. It contains the following biomes (or major habitat types): temperate coniferous forests; temperate grasslands, savannas, and shrublands; and deserts and xeric shrublands.

== Setting ==
The Idaho batholith ecoregion is bordered on the north by the Northern Rockies, on the east by the Middle Rockies, on the south by the Snake River Plain, on the west by the Blue Mountains, and partially on the northwest by the Columbia Plateau. It has been subdivided into eleven Level IV ecoregions in Idaho and Montana. As defined by the EPA, ecoregions are, "Areas of similarity regarding patterns in the mosaic of abiotic and biotic, aquatic and terrestrial ecosystem components, including geology, physiography, vegetation, climate, soils, hydrology, land use, and wildlife, with humans being considered as part of the biota."

The ecoregion is found within the Nearctic realm as designated by WWF, which covers most of North America. Realms are the broadest way of breaking up the Earth's land surface biogeographically. Realms characterize large amounts of habitat that contain organisms that have been evolving together in relative isolation for long time periods.

The most prevalent geological feature in this ecoregion is its namesake, the Idaho batholith. A batholith is a body of intrusive igneous rock formed by the cooling of magma under the Earth's surface. Igneous rocks are those formed by magma cooling and solidifying, while intrusive rocks are igneous rocks that form beneath the Earth's surface. The Idaho batholith is fundamentally different from other batholiths of the North American Cordillera in that it is mostly made up of peraluminous granites and positioned completely within the Precambrian continental crust. Peraluminous granites are those that contain more aluminum oxide than sodium oxide, potassium oxide, and calcium oxide combined. The batholith is composed of the Bitterroot lobe in the north and the larger Atlanta lobe in the south. The major mountain ranges in the region are part of the Rocky Mountains; they include the Bitterroot Range, Clearwater Mountains, Salmon River Mountains, and the Sawtooth Range. Major mountain peaks include 10,201 ft (3,109 m) tall Trapper Peak in the Bitterroot Mountains in Montana and 12,009 ft (3,660 m) tall Hyndman Peak in the Pioneer Mountains in Idaho.

Soils derived from the granite that characteristically underlays the ecoregion tend to retain water poorly and be limited in fertility. The removal of vegetation causes these soils to be highly erodible.

The rivers that flow through the ecoregion include the Payette, Selway, Salmon, Lochsa, Clearwater, Boise in Idaho, and the Bitterroot in Montana. The region lies within the Columbia and Missouri Watersheds for named rivers as designated by the United States Geological Survey (USGS). The Idaho Batholith ecoregion lies within the following WWF freshwater ecoregions: the Upper Snake, the Upper Missouri, and the Columbia Unglaciated. Lake Cascade, the fourth largest lake or reservoir in the state of Idaho is situated on the North Fork of the Payette River.

=== Level IV Ecoregions ===
==== Eastern Batholith(16a) ====
The Eastern Batholith ecoregion is located in the easternmost portion of the Idaho Batholith, which is just northwest of the Continental Divide. The region is forested and mountainous. Its surface waters tend to be very low in alkalinity, which is caused by its underlain intrusive rocks of the Cretaceous Idaho Batholith. Alkalinity is the measure of a solution's capacity to neutralize or buffer acids. The average annual precipitation ranges from 16–55 inches (41–140 centimetres). Climax vegetation includes subalpine fir (Abies lasiocarpa), Douglas-fir (Pseudotsuga menziesii), and ponderosa pine (Pinus ponderosa). Logging, grazing, mining, and recreation illustrate some of the more common land uses of the area.

==== Lochsa Uplands (16b) ====
The Lochsa Uplands ecoregion is mountainous and dissected. Granitic rocks underlay the region which is spread out by volcanic ash deposits that help improve the soil fertility and water retention in the uplands. Grand fir (Abies grandis) and Douglas-fir are common throughout the region. Engelmann spruce (Picea engelmannii) and subalpine fir grow at high elevations, while cedar-hemlock-pine forests are found in canyons and on north-facing slopes.

==== Lochsa-Selway-Clearwater Canyons (16c) ====
The Lochsa-Selway-Clearwater Canyons ecoregion features fast-flowing rivers transporting cold water. As the depths of canyons increase, they become warmer and drier. The ecoregion is dominated by Douglas-fir, grand fir, western redcedar (Thuja plicata), western larch (Larix occidentalis), and western white pine (Pinus monticola). Ponderosa pine is found on lower, drier sites. There are large tracts of wilderness here and the Selway River watershed is located within the region. Logging is common in non-wilderness areas.

==== Dry, Partly Wooded Mountains (16d) ====
Sedimentary (those formed by the deposition of sediment) and extrusive (those formed by magma cooling at the Earth's surface) rocks largely underlay the Dry, Partly Wooded Mountains ecoregion. Granitics are less likely to be found here than in any other part of the Idaho Batholith ecoregion, which is uncharacteristic. This region is on the leeward (or downwind) side of the mountains, meaning it is dry and receives very little precipitation. Unlike any other parts of the Idaho Batholith ecoregion, there is a mosaic of shrubland, open Douglas-fir forests, and aspen occurs. Mining is affecting water quality, and rapid residential and commercial growths are occurring near the city of Ketchum, Idaho.

==== Glaciated Bitterroot Mountains and Canyons (16e) ====
The Glaciated Bitterroot Mountains and Canyons ecoregion is spread out by volcanic ash and sediment left from glaciers. It is characteristically underlain by granite. The summits of mountains are high enough here to capture moisture from the Pacific Ocean, unlike in nearby ecoregions. Common vegetation includes grand fir, Douglas-fir, and western larch, while Engelmann spruce and subalpine fir can be found on north-facing slopes and at high elevations. Most of the region is wilderness or contains no roads, although recreation is common here.

==== Foothill Shrublands-Grasslands (16f) ====
The Foothill Shrublands-Grasslands ecoregion lies in the rain shadow of the high mountains, as does the Dry, Partly Wooded Mountains ecoregion. Being in the rain shadow of the mountains means that most of the area is dry and treeless. The landscape is covered by vegetation such as shrubs and grasses. Part of the region is situated near Boise, Idaho, which is experiencing residential development in rural areas; otherwise, land is mostly used for grazing.

==== High Glacial Drift-Filled Valleys (16g) ====
The High Glacial Drift Valleys ecoregion contains geological features formed by glaciers such as outwash plains and moraines, which are accumulations of unconsolidated glacial debris. The region also contains terraces, wetlands, and hills. Sedges (Cyperaceae) and rushes (Juncaceae) originally grew commonly in wet soils. In drier soils, bunch grasses and mountain big sagebrush (A. tridentata subsp. vaseyana) originally occurred. Lodgepole pine (Pinus contorta subsp. latifolia) and ponderosa pine originally grew in valley floors. Cold and snowy winters occur here. Large amounts of runoff from melting snow in the mountains occur during the spring. The region serves as pasture for livestock during the summer months. Land is also used for cropland and developments for recreation. Streams suffer raised sediment and nutrient (phosphorus) levels from flood irrigation and grazing.

==== High Idaho Batholith (16h) ====
The High Idaho Batholith ecoregion has been greatly impacted by glaciation. The glaciation of the region has resulted in geologic features such as jagged peaks, tarns, and rockland. Tarns are lakes that form in cirques (depressions that form at the heads of glacial valleys). Annual precipitation is greater than surrounding ecoregions at lower elevations and the mountains are often capped with snow. The soils are shallow, contain many stones, and have a cryic (cold) temperature regime. The region includes alpine areas, subalpine parkland, and open, windblown forests of mostly non-marketable trees such as subalpine fir and whitebark pine at very high elevations. Above treeline, tundra, alpine grasslands, subirrigated meadows, and wetlands are found.

==== South Clearwater Forested Mountains (16i) ====
The South Clearwater Forested Mountains ecoregion experiences maritime influences at a lower rate than ecoregions to the north, but at a higher rate than ecoregions to the south. Grand fir, found at elevations between where Douglas-fir and subalpine fir grow, is the only tree species in the region that receives maritime influences. Instability of slopes and sedimentation of streams is caused by logging. Rivers are also heavily impacted by various types of gold mining.

==== Hot Dry Canyons (16j) ====
The Hot Dry Canyons ecoregion is heavily dissected by the occurring canyons. Relief (or local relief) can reach 5,000 ft (1,500 m). Relief is the difference between the highest and lowest elevations in a given area. Much like the canyons in ecoregion 16c, the canyons here become drier and warmer as depth increases. This region receives little snowfall in the winter. Widespread vegetation includes mountain sagebrush, ponderosa pine, and various grasses. Vegetation on south-facing slopes is less than on north-facing slopes to the increased impact of the Sun due to the Earth's tilt in the Northern Hemisphere. This effect also causes the sites on south-facing slopes to be drier. Douglas-fir can also be found, but is less common than in nearby ecoregions. The bottoms of canyons have been impacted by mining. Some of these canyon bottoms are used as transportation corridors.

==== Southern Forested Mountains (16k) ====
Soils derived from granitic rocks, which are characteristically poor at retaining water spread out the Southern Forested Mountains ecoregion. This region receives marginal influence from maritime events. Ponderosa pine can be found growing in canyons, while grand fir and subalpine fir grow at higher elevations. Douglas-fir in open settings is common in the region, while sagebrush and forests can be found in the south. Like much of the Idaho Batholith ecoregion, soil disturbance results in high amounts of sediment being deposited in streams.

== Climate ==
According to the Köppen climate classifications, the main climate within the ecoregion is snowy, with a small portion in the northwest being warm temperate. There are three snowy climates associated with this ecoregion and one warm temperate. The largest and smallest snowy climates have a steppe precipitation class, while the remaining snowy and the warm temperate climate have a fully humid precipitation class. A steppe precipitation class is one that you would expect to find on a steppe across the globe. Steppes average 10–30 inches (25–76 centimetres) of precipitation per year. A steppe is a type grassland habitat that is usually located away from large bodies of water and near mountains. The smallest of the snowy climates has a cool summer temperature class, while the remaining three climates have a warm summer temperature class.

According to the National Oceanic and Atmospheric Administration (NOAA), the ecoregion received anywhere from 10–80 inches (25–203 centimetres) of precipitation for the entire 2012 calendar year.

The average temperature for the ecoregion for the 2012 calendar year averaged between 40–60 °F (4–16 °C) according to NOAA.

Snowfall and thunderstorms are the two major weather systems that influence the climate throughout the ecoregion. As noted above, the major climate in the area is snowy. When snow melts, it increases erosion and the amount of water being introduced into bodies of water. Thunderstorms have a large impact on the amounts of precipitation in the region and greatly influence flood events and erosion.

== Human use ==
There are no major cities within the Idaho Batholith ecoregion; however there are small resort towns like McCall, Idaho that offer outdoor recreation such as alpine skiing.

The resources in the ecoregion include fishing, crop production, grazing, mining, logging, and recreation. Several recreation areas such as Painted Rocks State Park in Montana and Lucky Peak State Park in Idaho exist in the region. Painted Rocks State Park, named after the colorful lichens that cover the granite walls and rhyolite cliffs within the park, offers boating, camping, and fishing. Rhyolite is the same as granite chemically; however it is an extrusive rock, whereas granite is an intrusive rock. Lucky Peak State Park offers boating, fishing, biking, and even offers its own beach.

== Threats and conservation ==
Several natural threats to the ecoregion include forest fires, storms, and erosional events. Slide failures, which produce debris flows, and floods with increased amounts of sediment are some of the known results of prolonged storms in the region. Fires help speed up the removal of vegetation from the soil, which in turn increases the rate of erosion and sediment transport. Resource extraction in the region includes but is not limited to logging, fishing, mining, and removal of vegetation via livestock grazing. Due to the mountainous terrain of the region, much of the land within the Idaho Batholith is inaccessible to automobiles, thus in a more natural state. Protected forests include Boise National Forest, Sawtooth National Forest, Salmon–Challis National Forest, Payette National Forest, Nez Perce National Forest, and Bitterroot National Forest. Natural areas in the region include the Selway–Bitterroot Wilderness, Gospel Hump Wilderness, Frank Church–River of No Return Wilderness, and Sawtooth Wilderness.

The ecoregion is not part of the Global 200 designated by WWF, and it is not a biodiversity hotspot.

== See also ==
- Ecoregions defined by the EPA and the Commission for Environmental Cooperation:
  - List of ecoregions in North America (CEC)
  - List of ecoregions in the United States (EPA)
  - List of ecoregions in Idaho
  - List of ecoregions in Montana
- The conservation group World Wildlife Fund maintains an alternate classification system:
  - List of ecoregions (WWF)
  - List of ecoregions in the United States (WWF)
- List of biogeographic realms (WWF)
- List of freshwater ecoregions (WWF)
