= Cascades (ecoregion) =

Temperate coniferous forests ecoregion of the United States

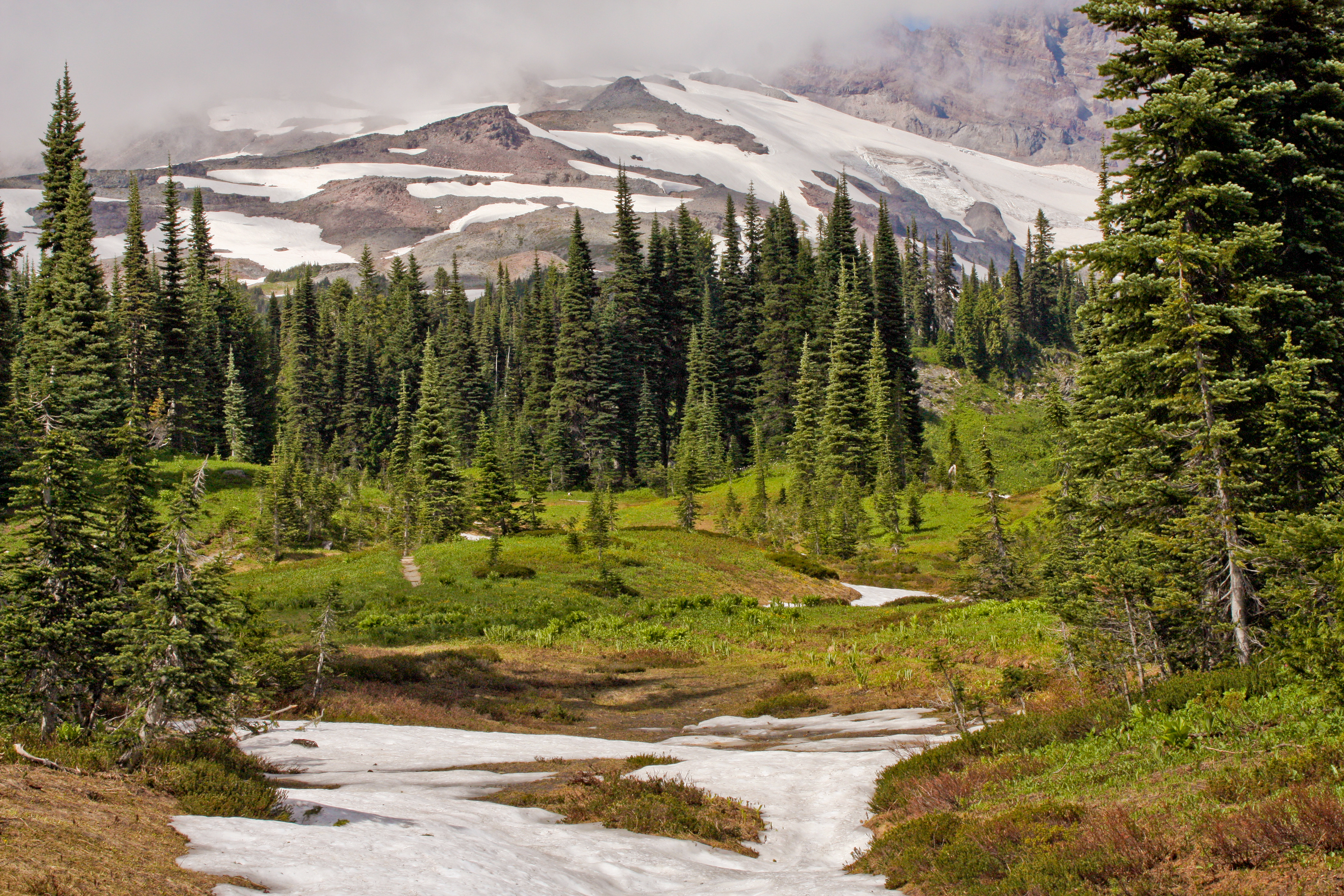
- Scattered patches of subalpine fir grow below glaciers and permanent snowfields on the south slope of Mount Rainier in ecoregion 4d.

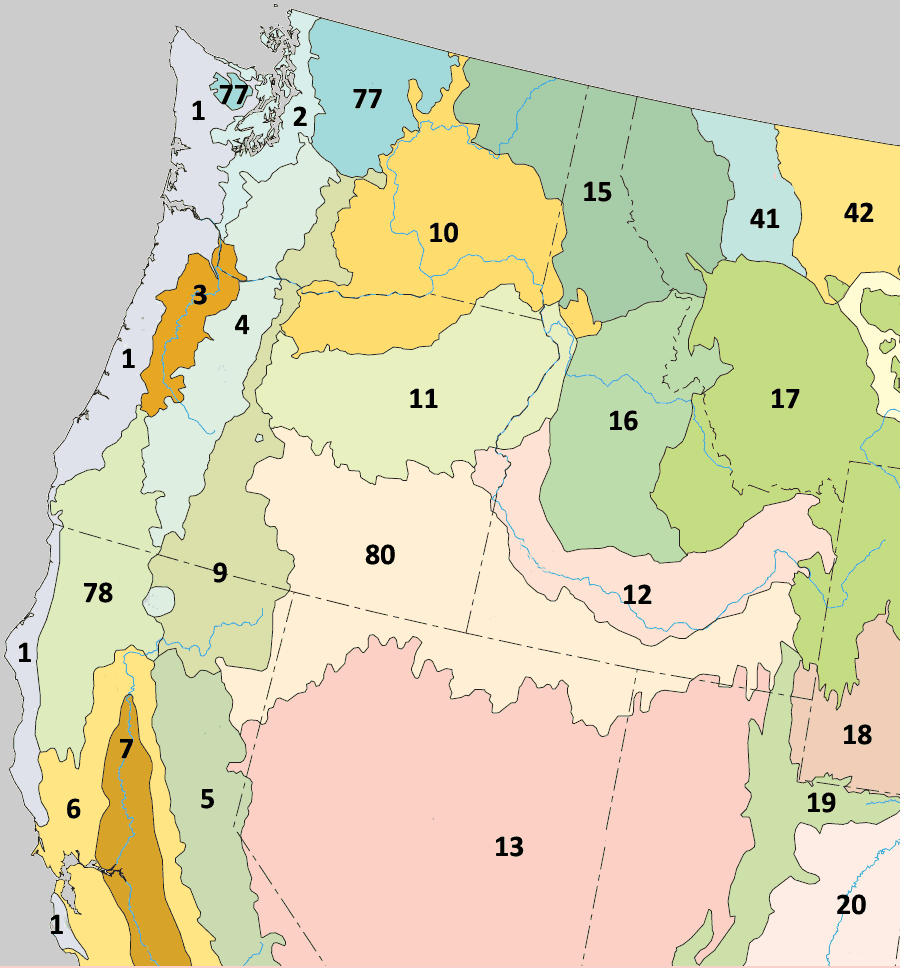
- Level III ecoregions of the Pacific Northwest. The Cascades ecoregion is marked with (4).

Ecology
- Realm: Nearctic
- Biome: Temperate coniferous forests
- Borders: List: Puget Lowland (2); Willamette Valley (3); Eastern Cascades Slopes and Foothills (9); North Cascades (77); Klamath Mountains (78)

Geography
- Area: 44,952 km^{2} (17,356 mi^{2})
- Country: United States
- States: Washington; Oregon; California
- Coordinates: 45°N 122°W

The Cascades ecoregion is a Level III ecoregion designated by the United States Environmental Protection Agency (EPA) in the U.S. states of Washington, Oregon, and California. Somewhat smaller than the Cascade mountain range for which it is named, the ecoregion extends north to Snoqualmie Pass, near Seattle, and south to Hayden Pass, near the Oregon-California border, including the peaks and western slopes of most of the High Cascades. A discontiguous section is located on Mount Shasta in California.

The mountainous region is underlain by Cenozoic volcanic rock that has been affected by alpine glaciations. The eastern part of the region contains active and dormant volcanoes in the Cascades Volcanic Arc, with elevations of up to 14,411 feet (4,392 m). The western Cascades are older, lower, and dissected by numerous, steep-sided stream valleys. The region has a moist, temperate climate, which supports an extensive and highly productive coniferous forest that is intensively managed for logging, as well as recreational use. Subalpine meadows occur at higher elevations.

Much of the region consists of public lands managed by the federal government, including the Mount Baker-Snoqualmie, Wenatchee, Gifford Pinchot, Mount Hood, Columbia River Gorge National Scenic Area, Willamette, Umpqua, and Rogue River National Forests; the Clearwater, Norse Peak, Tatoosh, William O. Douglas, Goat Rocks, Mount Adams, Indian Heaven, Trapper Creek, Salmon–Huckleberry, Mount Hood, Table Rock, Bull of the Woods, Opal Creek, Middle Santiam, Menagerie, Mount Jefferson, Mount Washington, Three Sisters, Diamond Peak, Boulder Creek, Mount Thielsen, Rogue–Umpqua Divide, Sky Lakes, and Mountain Lakes Wilderness Areas; Mount Rainier and Crater Lake National Parks; and the Mount St. Helens National Volcanic Monument.

The Cascades is bordered on the north by the North Cascades ecoregion, on the south by the Klamath Mountains ecoregion, on the east by the Eastern Cascades Slopes and Foothills, and on the west by the Willamette Valley and Puget Lowland ecoregions. It been subdivided into six Level IV ecoregions in Washington and Oregon, as described below. Level IV mapping is not yet complete in California.

Animals include black bears, deer, elk, bobcats, cougars, coyotes, skunks, raccoons, and chipmunks. Wolves were extirpated in the early 20th century but a few packs have recolonized the ecoregion. In April 2024, the NPS and USFWS announced a decision to reintroduce grizzly bears to the North Cascades in Washington.

== Level IV ecoregions ==
Map of the Cascades ecoregion in Washington state

=== Western Cascades Lowlands and Valleys (4a) ===
The Western Cascades Lowlands and Valleys ecoregion comprises a network of steep ridges and narrow valleys on the lower slopes of the Cascade Mountains. Elevation varies from 600 to 4,000 feet (180 to 1,220 m). Its mild, wet climate promotes lush forests dominated by western hemlock and Coast douglas-fir, with western redcedar, bigleaf maple, red alder, vine maple, salal, rhododendron, Oregon grape, huckleberry, thimbleberry, swordfern, oxalis, hazel, and blackberry. Soils are warmer here than in higher elevation ecoregions, and it is one of the most important timber producing areas in the Pacific Northwest. The steep valleys trending to the west contain high and medium gradient rivers and streams that support cold water salmonids, including the threatened Chinook salmon, steelhead, and bull trout. Notable river drainages in Oregon include the North Umpqua, North and Middle Forks of the Willamette, McKenzie, North Santiam, South Santiam, Clackamas, Salmon and Bull Run River watersheds; and in Washington, the Lewis, Cowlitz, Nisqually, Puyallup, White, and Green River watersheds. Reservoirs store winter snowmelt for irrigation and municipal water supply in the Willamette Valley. The Westerns Cascades Lowlands and Valleys is the largest of the Cascades subregions, covering 3,905 square miles (10,110 km^{2}) in Oregon and 2,397 square miles (6,208 km^{2}) in Washington.

=== Western Cascades Montane Highlands (4b) ===
The Western Cascades Montane Highlands ecoregion is characterized by steeply sloping, dissected mountains with high to medium gradient streams and glacial rock-basin lakes. Elevation varies from 3,000 and 6,500 feet (910 and 2,000 m). The western Cascades are older and more eroded than the lava plateau and prominent snow-covered cones of the High Cascades to the east. They are underlain by dark basalt in contrast to the gray andesite of the High Cascades. The region has lower temperatures and receives more winter snow than the lowlands and valleys to the west. Soils have a frigid or cryic temperature regimes. Abundant precipitation supports forests dominated by Douglas-fir and western hemlock, with mountain hemlock, noble fir, subalpine fir, grand fir, Pacific silver fir, red alder, and Pacific yew, and an understory of vine maple, rhododendron, Oregon grape, huckleberry, and thimbleberry. Today, the region is heavily managed for logging and recreation, and it is an important water source for lower elevation urban, suburban, and agricultural areas. It is the second-largest of the Cascades subregions, covering 2,729 square miles (7,070 km^{2}) in Oregon and 1,828 square miles (4,734 km^{2}) in Washington.

=== Cascade Crest Montane Forest (4c) ===
Map of the ecoregions of the Oregon Cascades

The Cascade Crest Montane Forest ecoregion consists of an undulating plateau punctuated by volcanic buttes and cones that reach a maximum elevation of about 6,500 feet (2,000 m). Volcanism in the Pliocene epoch overtopped the existing Miocene volcanics of the Western Cascades Montane Highlands. Later, Pleistocene glaciation left numerous rock-basin lakes throughout the plateau. Sinuous, medium gradient streams cross the subdued, glaciated terrain. The region is extensively forested with mountain hemlock, Pacific silver fir, and subalpine fir, with some grand fir, noble fir, Douglas-fir, Engelmann spruce, and lodgepole pine, and an understory of vine maple, huckleberry, rhododendron, beargrass, twinflower, and wintergreen. Mountain meadows support sedges, dwarf willows, and tufted hairgrass. The region covers 1,909 square miles (4,940 km^{2}) in Oregon and 310 square miles (803 km^{2}) in Washington, running along the spine of the Cascades; an isolated pocket of this ecoregion can be found on Newberry Volcano southeast of Bend.

=== Cascades Subalpine/Alpine (4d) ===
The Cascades Subalpine/Alpine ecoregion is an area of high, glaciated, volcanic peaks rising above subalpine meadows, with cascading streams, glacial cirques, and tarns. Pleistocene glaciation reshaped the mountains above 6,500 feet (2,000 m), leaving moraines, glacial lakes, and U-shaped glacial canyons. Glaciers and permanent snowfields still occur on the highest peaks, decreasing from north to south. The vegetation is adapted to high elevations, cold winter temperatures, a short growing season, and a deep winter snow pack. Herbaceous and shrubby subalpine meadow vegetation and scattered patches of mountain hemlock, subalpine fir, and whitebark pine occur near the timberline. Wet meadows support Brewer's sedge, Holm's sedge, black alpine sedge, tufted hairgrass, and alpine aster. Elsewhere, there is bare rock. The region covers 388 square miles (1,000 km^{2}) in Washington and 331 square miles (860 km^{2}) in Oregon and contains many of the prominent volcanic peaks of the high Cascades, including Mount Rainier, Mount Adams, Mount Hood, Mount Jefferson, Three Sisters, Mount Bachelor, Diamond Peak, Mount Scott, and Mount McLoughlin. Elevations of the ecoregion in California typically are above 7,600 feet (2,300 m).

=== High Southern Cascades Montane Forest (4e) ===
The High Southern Cascades Montane Forest ecoregion is an undulating, glaciated, volcanic plateau punctuated by isolated buttes and cones. Many tarns occur. With an elevation that varies from 4,000 to 8,200 feet (1,200 to 2,500 m) in Oregon and 5,500 to 8,500 feet (1,700 to 2,600 m) in California, it is an intermediate zone between the Southern Cascades and the Subalpine/Alpine zone. Cryic soils support mixed coniferous forests dominated by mountain hemlock, lodgepole pine, and Pacific silver fir; they are colder than the mesic and frigid soils of the Southern Cascades. Grand fir, white fir, and Shasta red fir also occur and become more common toward the south and east. Whitebark pine is found at high elevations. Understory plants include woodrush, Prince's pine, lupine, and sidebells shinleaf. At the highest elevations, open meadows support Shasta buckwheat, Newberry knotweed, and Brewer's sedge. The region tends to be drier than the Cascade Crest Montane Forest, with a longer summer drought and more intermittent streams. The region covers 915 square miles (2,370 km^{2}) in Southern Oregon and includes the lower elevations of Crater Lake National Park.

=== Southern Cascades (4f) ===
Map of ecoregions of the California Cascades

The Southern Cascades ecoregion is lower in elevation and less rugged than the surrounding regions and is characterized by gently sloping mountains and broad valleys. Elevation varies from 1,400 to 5,300 feet (430 to 1,620 m). The climate is drier than other parts of the Cascades, and the vegetation reflects the long summer drought. River and stream discharge are also significantly lower than in systems to the north. Western hemlock and western red cedar, which are indicator species in the Western Cascades ecoregions, decline southward in the Southern Cascades, and are replaced by Sierra Nevada species such as California incense-cedar, white fir, Shasta red fir, and sugar pine, with an understory of snowberry, twinflower, Oregon grape, serviceberry, golden chinkapin, and oceanspray. At lower elevations, Douglas-fir and ponderosa pine are prevalent. The region covers 1,414 square miles (3,660 km^{2}) in Southern Oregon, in the South Umpqua and Rogue River watersheds, separated from the Western Cascades by the Calapooya Divide. In California, shrubs such as manzanita and ceanothus are common. Curl-leaf mountain mahogany, big sagebrush, and antelope bitterbrush occur as well, with their dispersion centers in the Great Basin regions farther east. River and stream discharge is significantly less than in ecoregions to the north. Elevations in the California part of this ecoregion are about 3,000 to 7,600 feet (900 to 2,300 m).

=== California Cascades Eastside Conifer Forest (4g) ===
The California Cascades Eastside Conifer Forest ecoregion is drier than the other California Cascades regions. It is dominated by ponderosa pine and, in some areas, Jeffrey pine where conditions are harsher. In lower, drier areas, the region blends into the western juniper and sagebrush fields more typical of adjacent Eastern Cascades Slopes and Foothills ecoregion. The region wraps around to the western side (that is, the Mount Shasta foothills), as similar dry conditions exist from the rain shadow cast by the Klamath Mountains to the west. Elevations range from 3,000 to 7,100 feet (910 to 2,160 m).

=== Southern Cascades Foothills (4h) ===
The Southern Cascades Foothills ecoregion of volcanic hills and plateaus is mostly in the 2,000-to-4,000-foot (610 to 1,220 m) elevation range, stretching from the town of Paradise, California in the south to the Pit River in the north. It contains dry-mesic mixed conifer forest and lower montane black oak-conifer forest and woodland. Ponderosa pine is abundant along with some Douglas fir, and, at higher elevations, white fir. Hardwoods typically are black oak and canyon live oak. Soil temperature regimes are mostly mesic with some frigid, and soil moisture regimes are xeric.

== Gallery ==
=== Flora ===
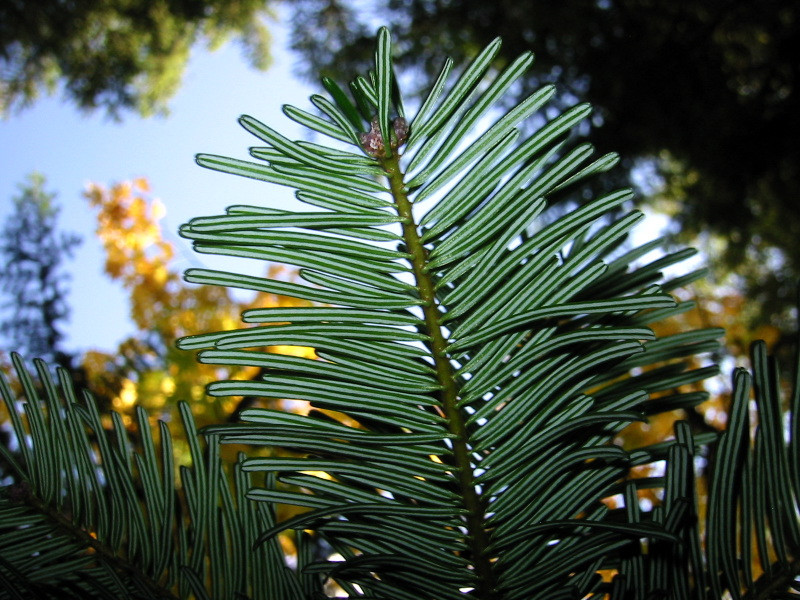
Grand fir in Wenatchee National Forest

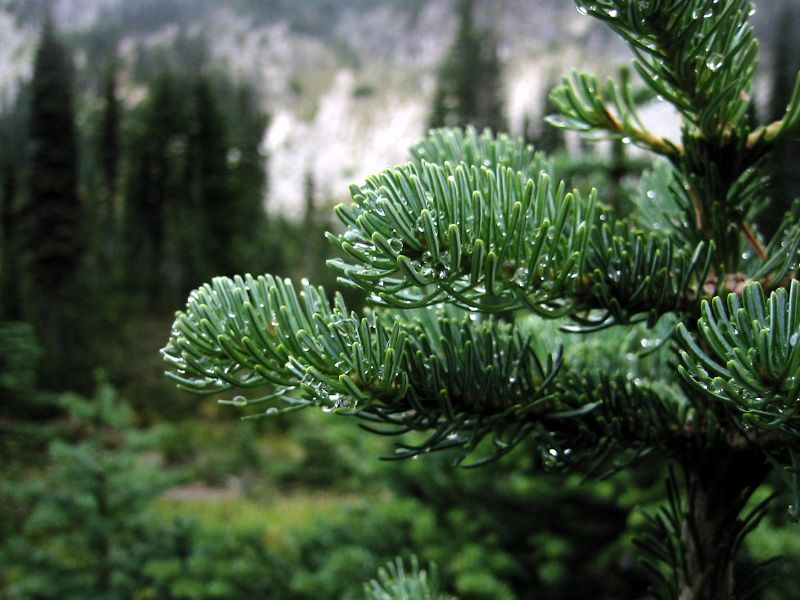
Subalpine fir in Mount Rainier National Park

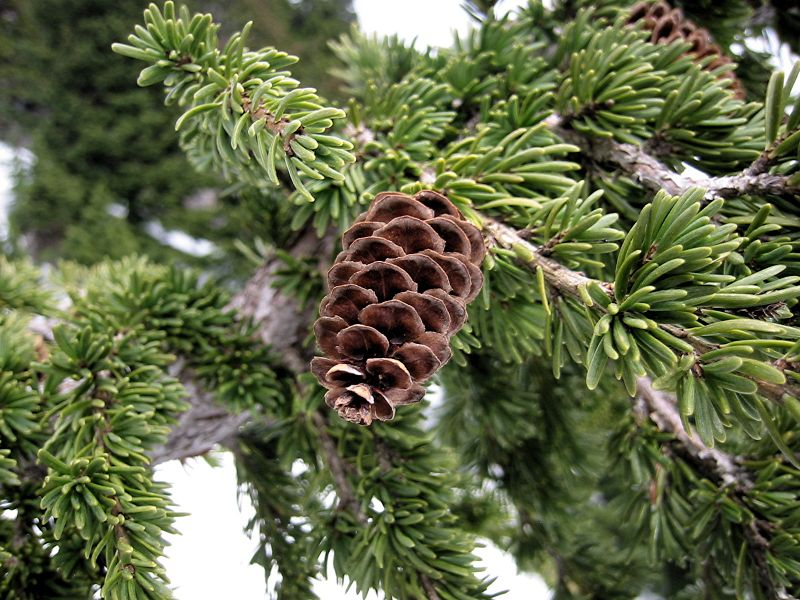
Mountain hemlock in the Mount Baker-Snoqualmie National Forest

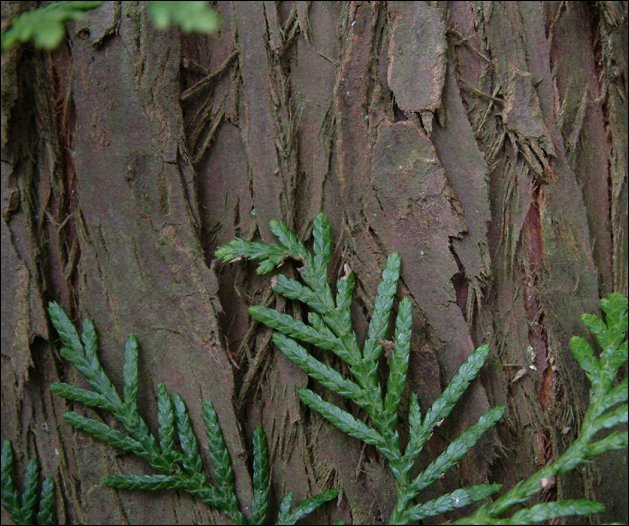
Western redcedar

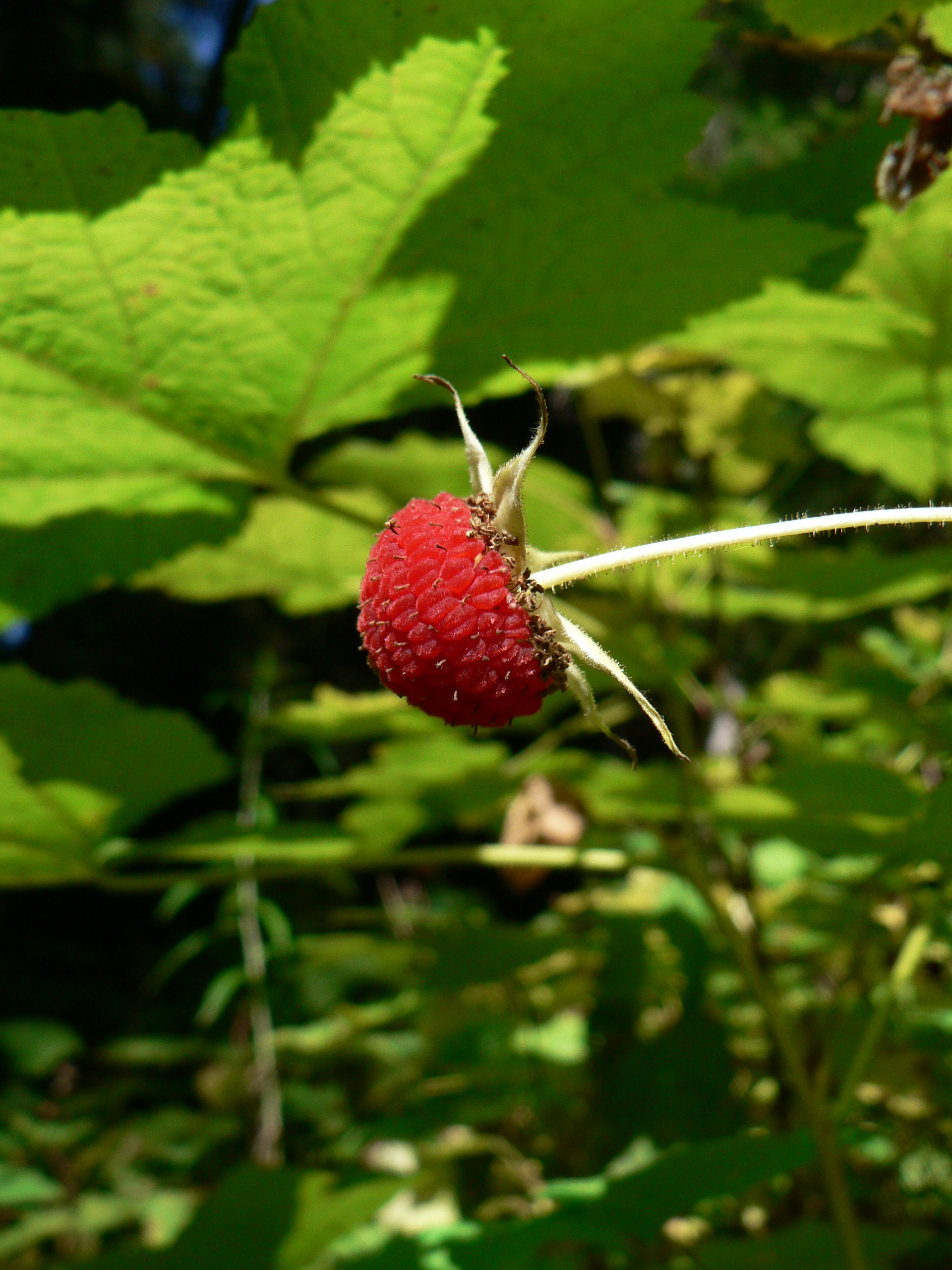
Thimbleberry

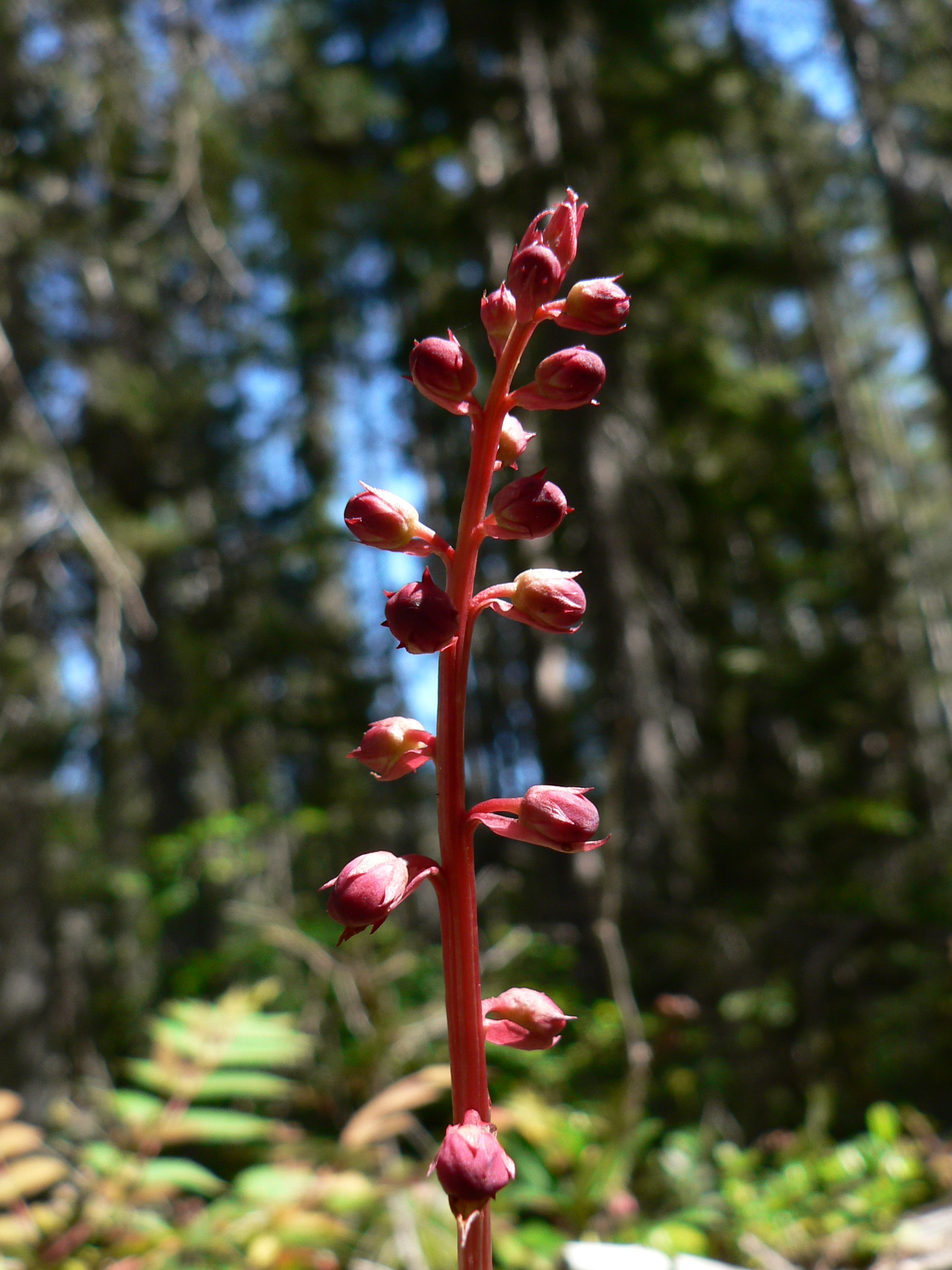
Pink wintergreen in the William O. Douglas Wilderness

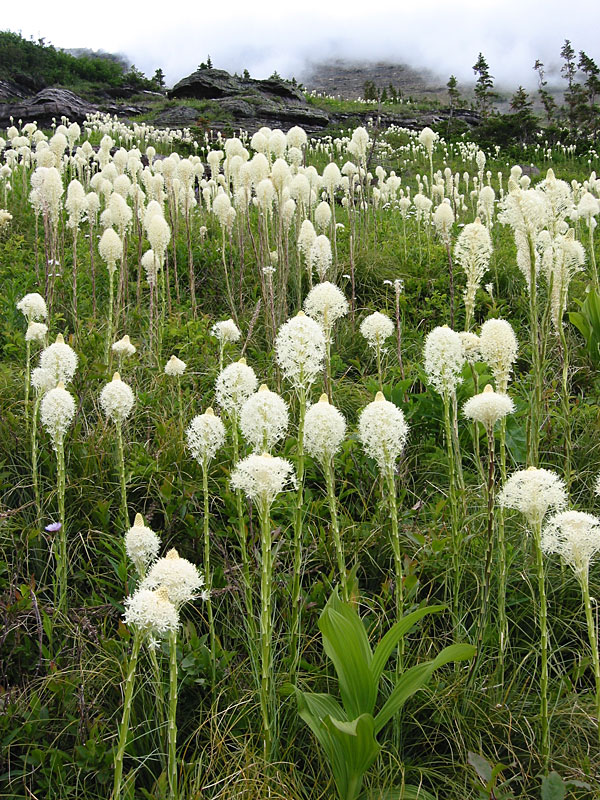
Beargrass

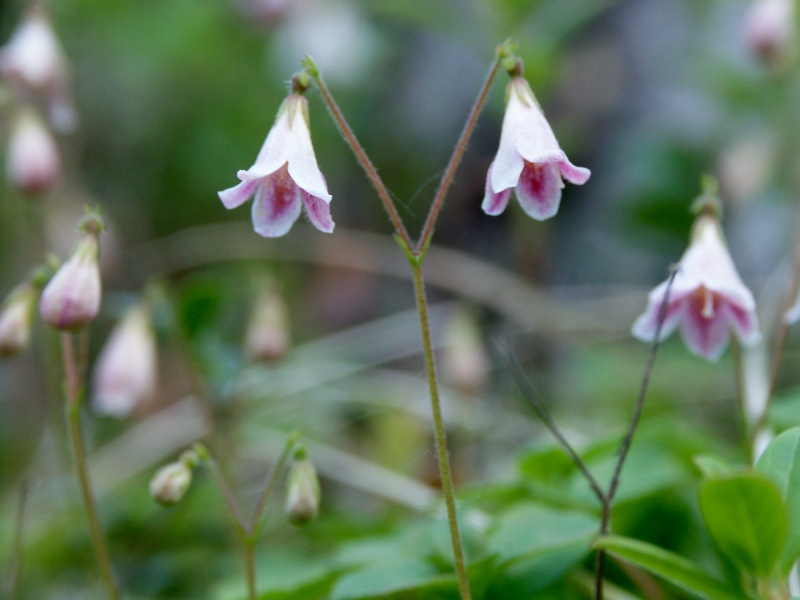
Twinflower

=== Fauna ===
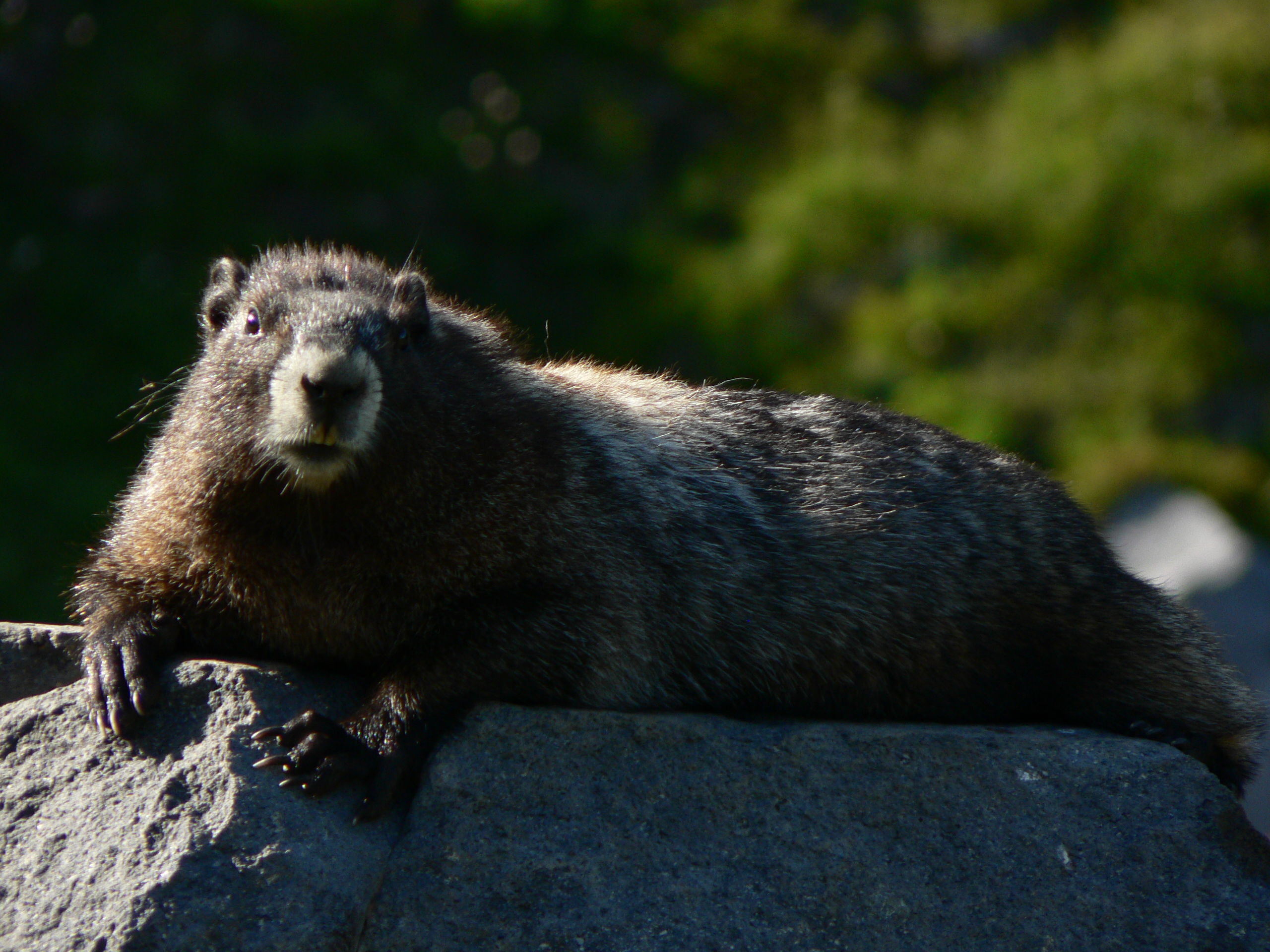
Hoary marmot in Mount Rainier National Park

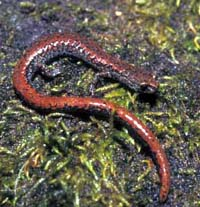
Oregon slender salamander, found in maple, redcedar, and Douglas-fir forests

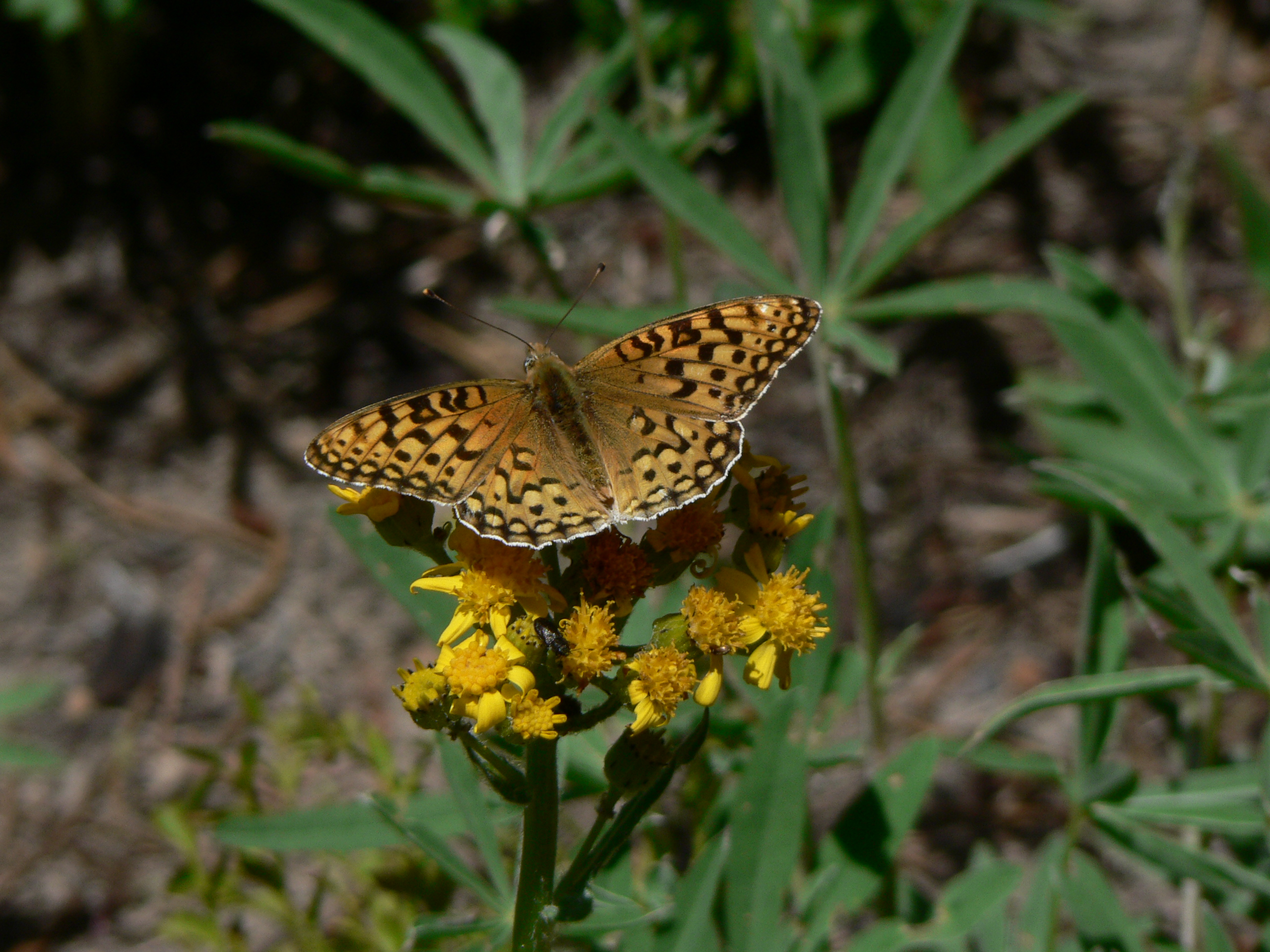
Speyeria zerene in the William O. Douglas Wilderness

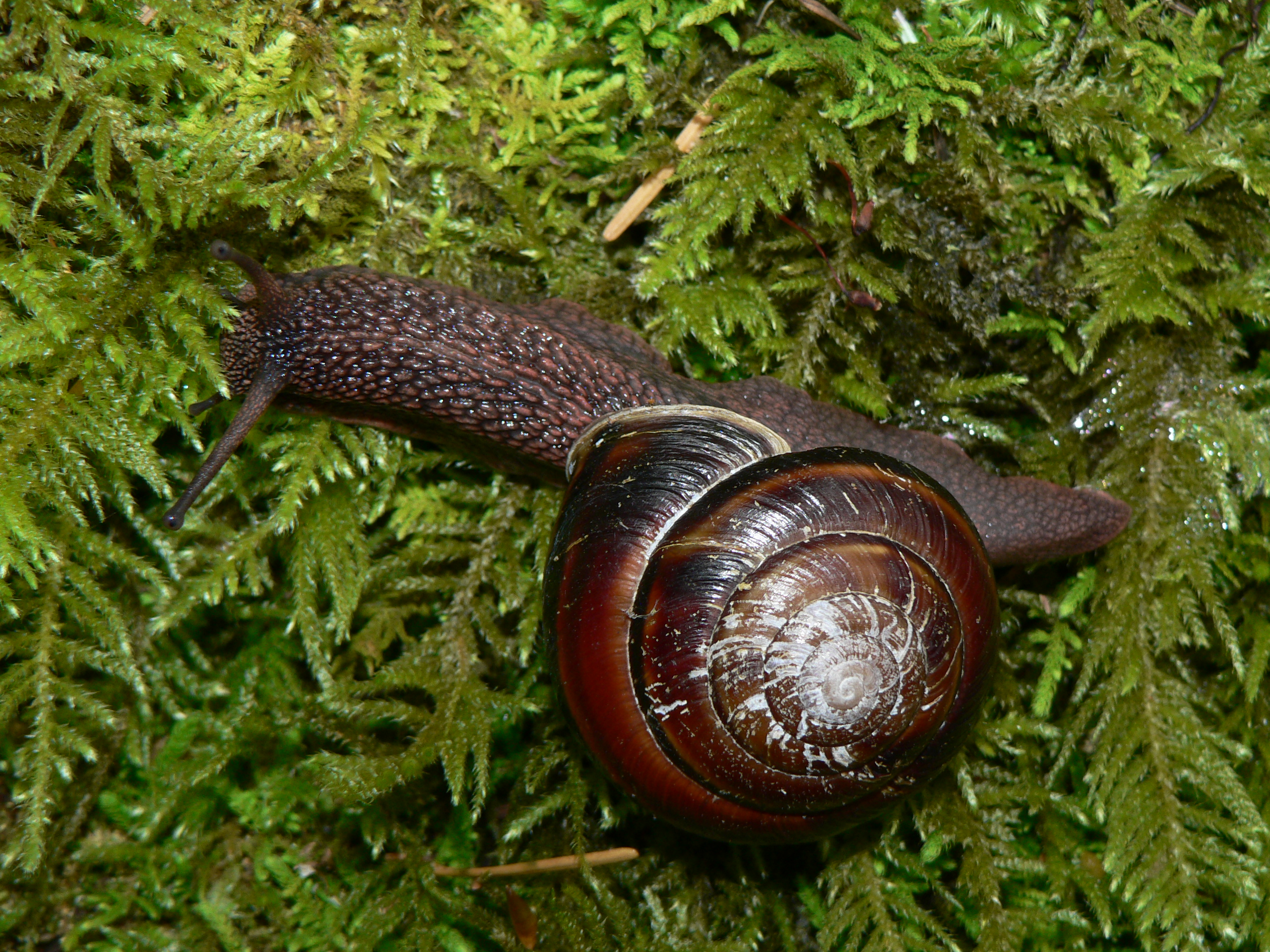
Pacific sideband in Squak Mountain State Park

=== Landscapes ===
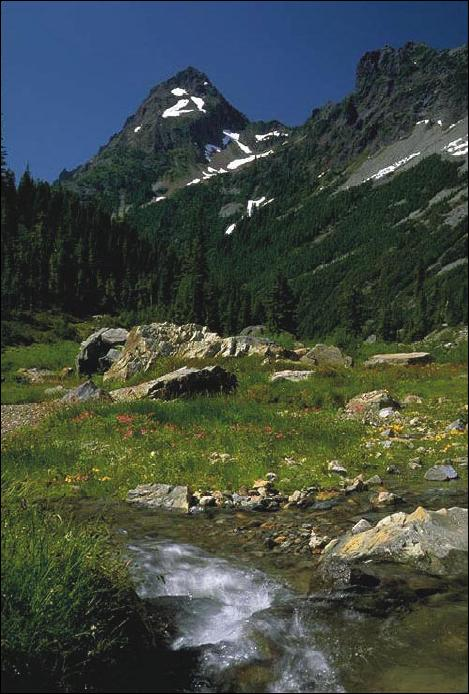
Subalpine meadow in Mount Baker-Snoqualmie National Forest

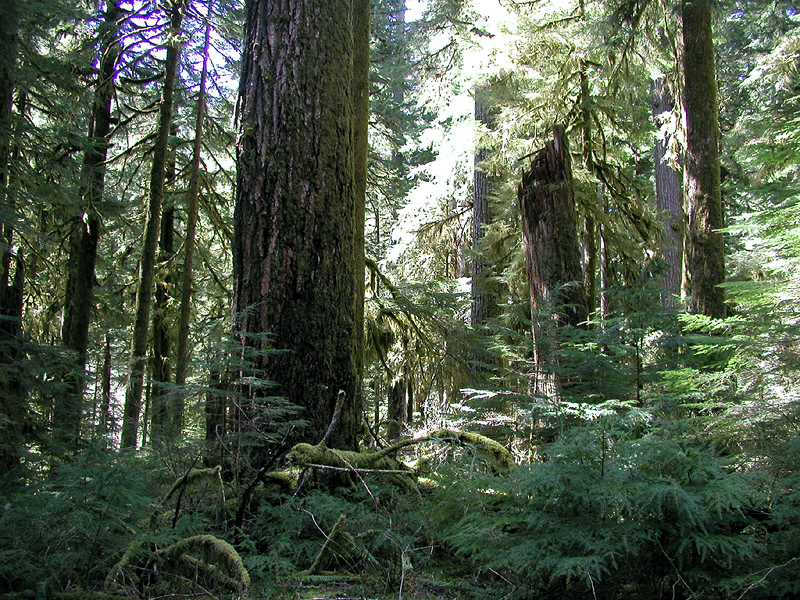
Old-growth forest in the Opal Creek Wilderness

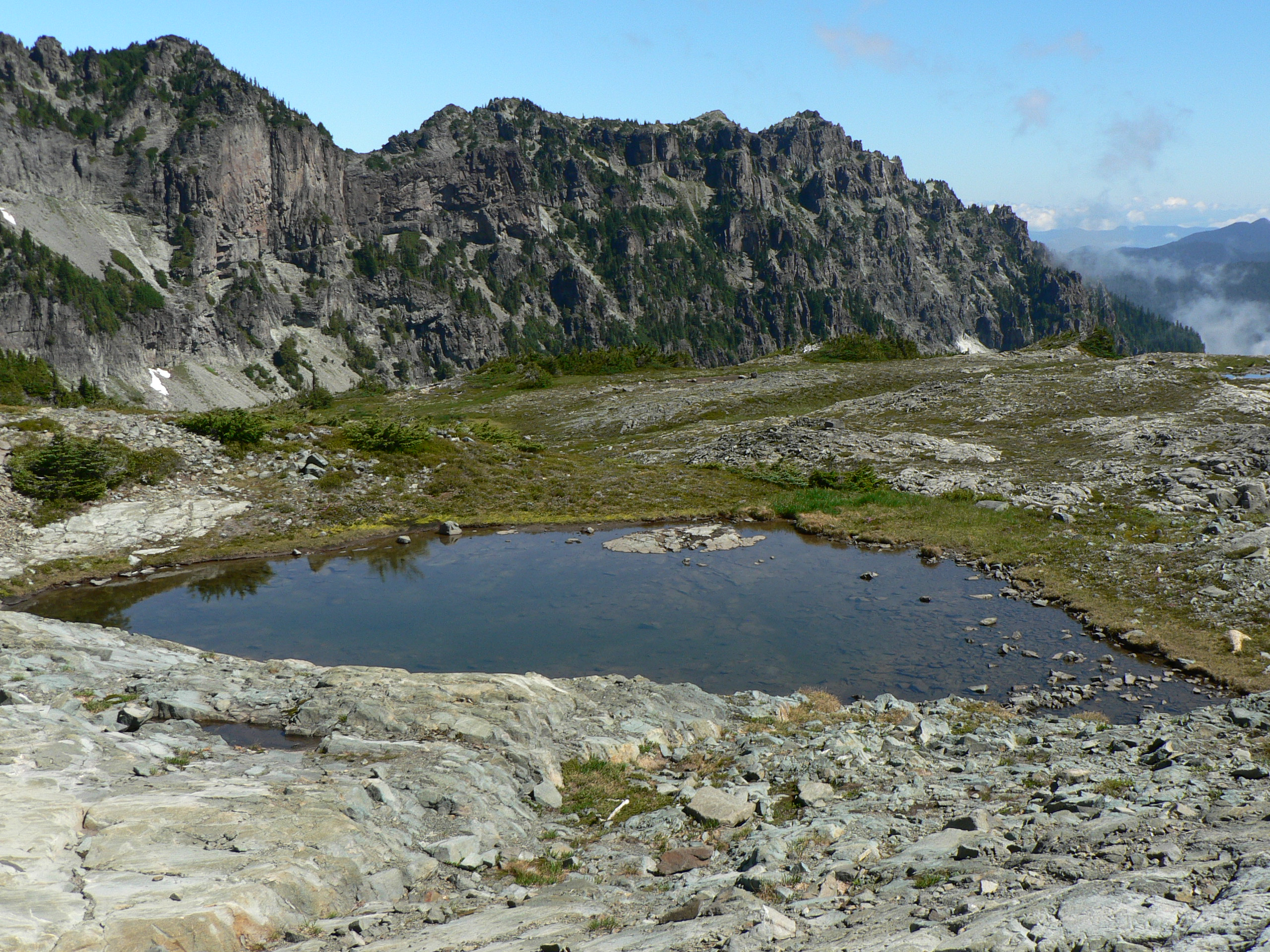
Tarn in Mount Rainier National Park

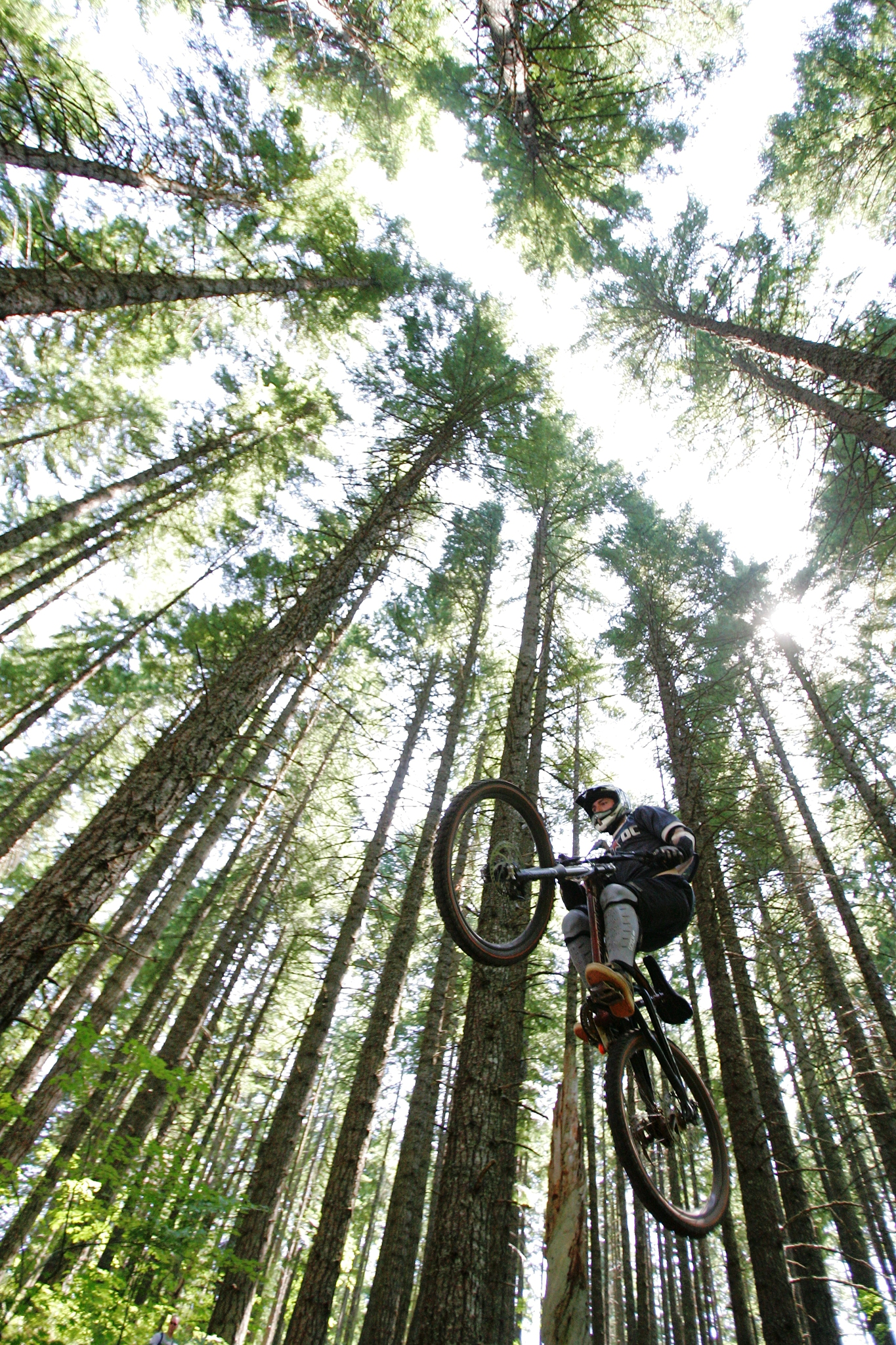
Mt. Hood National Forest receives heavy recreational use

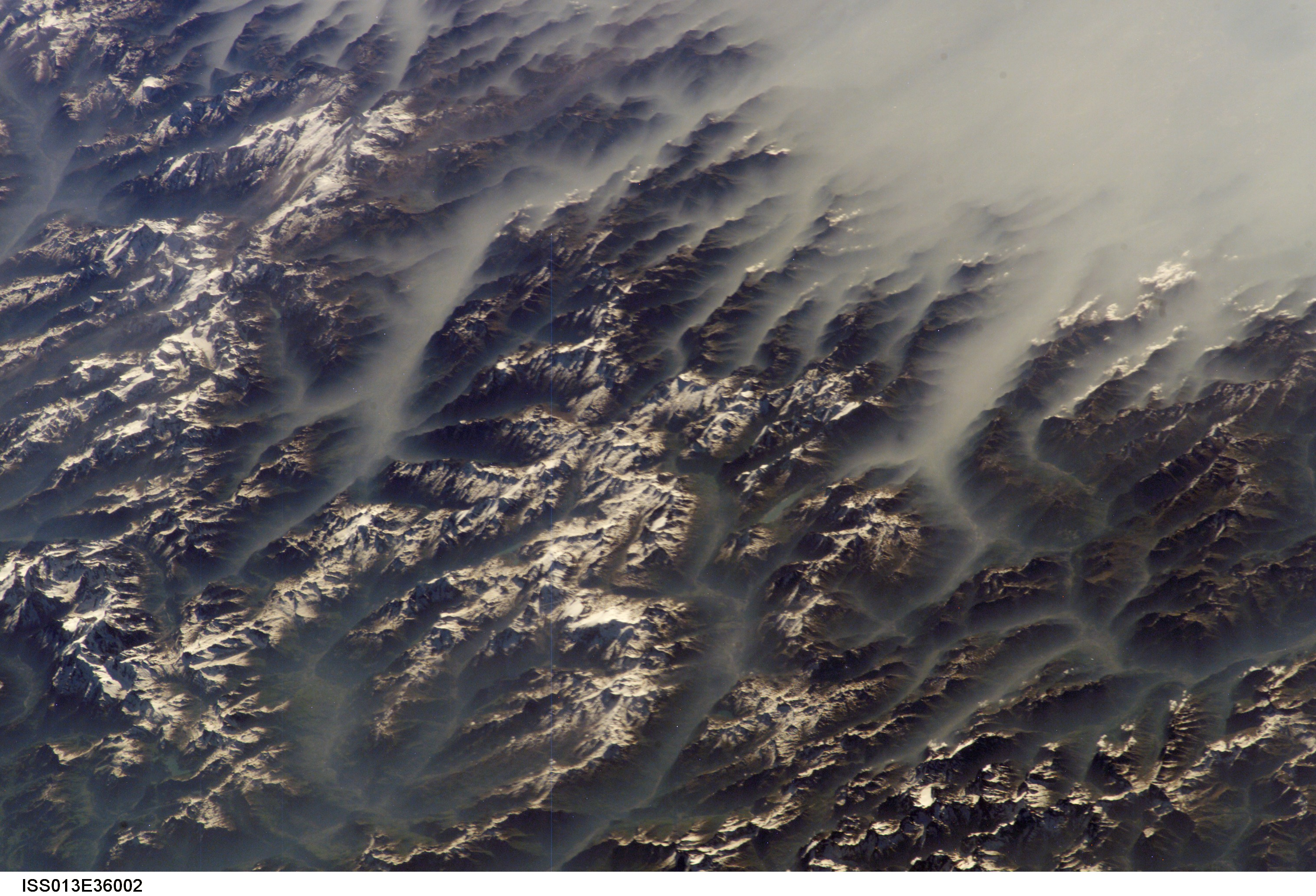
Clouds fill the valleys, but not the mountaintops. From the ISS in June 2006.

== See also ==
- Ecoregions defined by the EPA and the Commission for Environmental Cooperation:
  - List of ecoregions in North America (CEC)
  - List of ecoregions in the United States (EPA)
  - List of ecoregions in Oregon
  - List of ecoregions in Washington
  - List of ecoregions in California
- The conservation group World Wildlife Fund maintains an alternate classification system:
  - List of ecoregions (WWF)
  - List of ecoregions in the United States (WWF)
