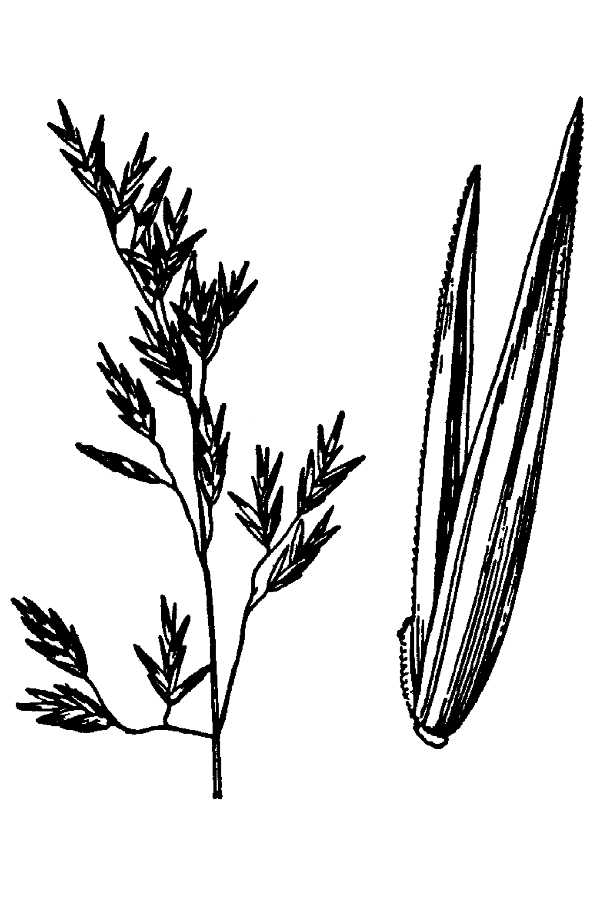

Scientific classification
- Kingdom: Plantae
- Clade: Tracheophytes
- Clade: Angiosperms
- Clade: Monocots
- Clade: Commelinids
- Order: Poales
- Family: Poaceae
- Subfamily: Pooideae
- Genus: Festuca
- Species: F. viridula

Binomial name
- Festuca viridula Vasey

Synonyms
- Festuca howellii

= Festuca viridula =

Species of flowering plant

Festuca viridula is a species of grass known by several common names, including green fescue, greenleaf fescue, and mountain bunchgrass. It is native to western North America from British Columbia to Colorado, where it is most abundant in high-elevation forests and meadows.

== Description ==
This fescue is a clumping perennial bunchgrass with stems generally one half to one meter in height. The leaves are narrow and often have rolled edges, are surrounded by sheaths that shred into fibers, and may be tough and spikelike on the lower part of the plant. The erect inflorescence has a few branches each holding flat green spikelets. This is an important forage grass for livestock in some areas.
