= Pacific temperate rainforests =

Temperate rainforest in the Pacific Northwest

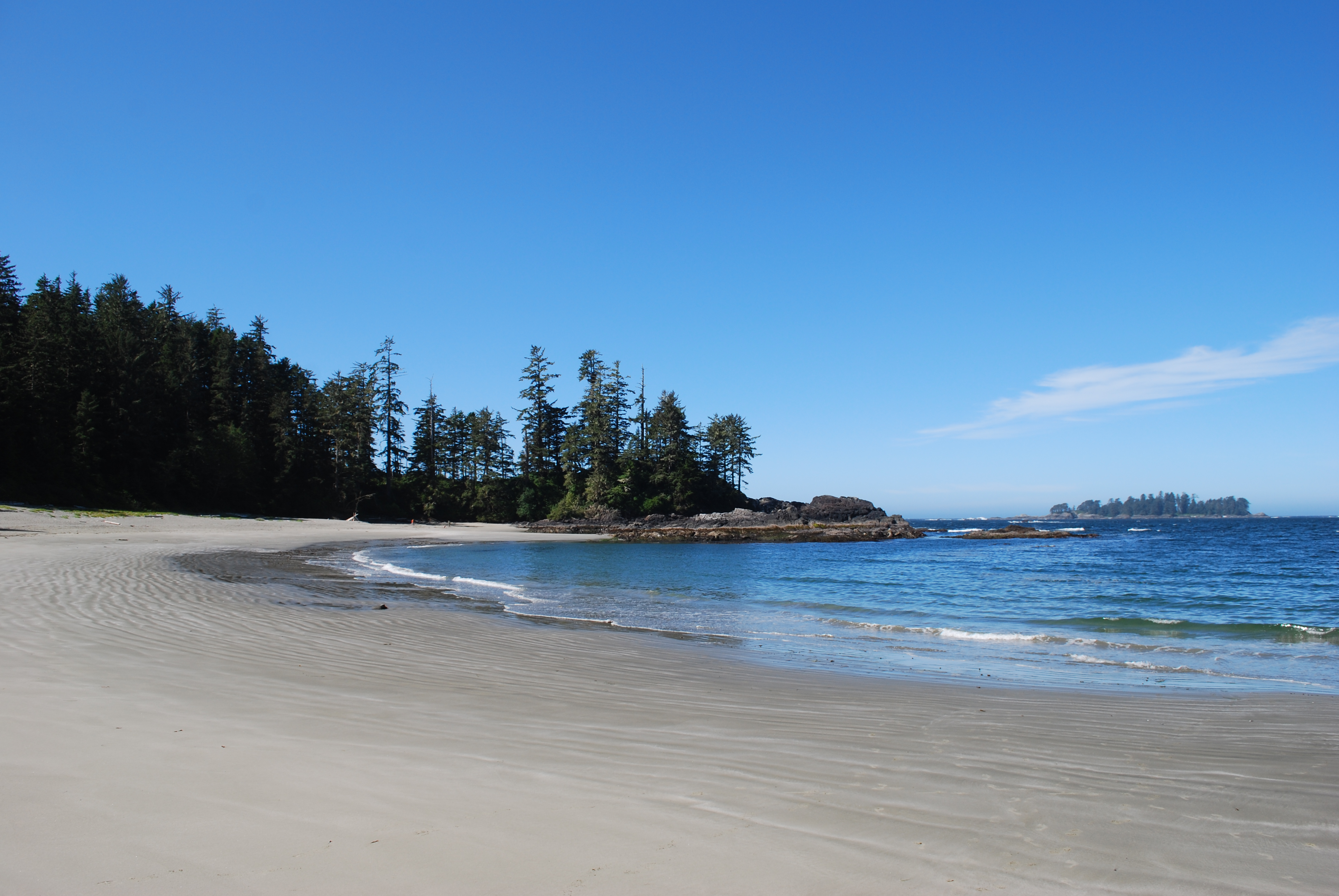
Temperate rain forests, such as this in British Columbia's Vancouver Island, often grow right up to the shoreline.

The Pacific temperate rainforests of western North America is one of the largest temperate rain forest regions on the planet. The Pacific temperate rainforests lie along the western side of the Pacific Coast Ranges along the Pacific Northwest Coast of North America from the Prince William Sound in Alaska through the British Columbia Coast to Northern California, and are part of the Nearctic realm. The Pacific temperate rain forests are characterized by a high amount of rainfall, in some areas more than 300 cm (10 ft) per year and moderate temperatures in both the summer and winter months (10–24 °C or 50–75 °F).

This ecoregion is a subregion of the Cascadia bioregion.

These rainforests occur in a number of ecoregions, which vary in their species composition, but are predominantly of conifers, sometimes with an understory of broadleaf trees, ferns and shrubs. In the WWF's system, the ecoregions of the Pacific temperate rainforests are the Northern Pacific coastal forests, Haida Gwaii, British Columbia mainland coastal forests, Central Pacific coastal forests, Central and Southern Cascades forests, Klamath-Siskiyou forests, and Northern California coastal forests ecoregions.

== Flora ==
The forests in the north contain predominantly Sitka spruce (Picea sitchensis) and western hemlock (Tsuga heterophylla), while those in the coastal forests are home to both species mentioned, as well as coast redwood (Sequoia sempervirens), coast Douglas-fir (Pseudotsuga menziesii), western redcedar (Thuja plicata) and shore pine (Pinus contorta). Notably, many of the world's largest and tallest tree species are found in this ecoregion. Dense growths of epiphytes and mosses cover the trees, and lush vegetation is present everywhere.

Hardwood trees such as the bigleaf maple and the alder are also common, especially at lower elevations and along stream banks, and are vital to the ecosystem, in part because of their nitrogen fixing.

== History ==
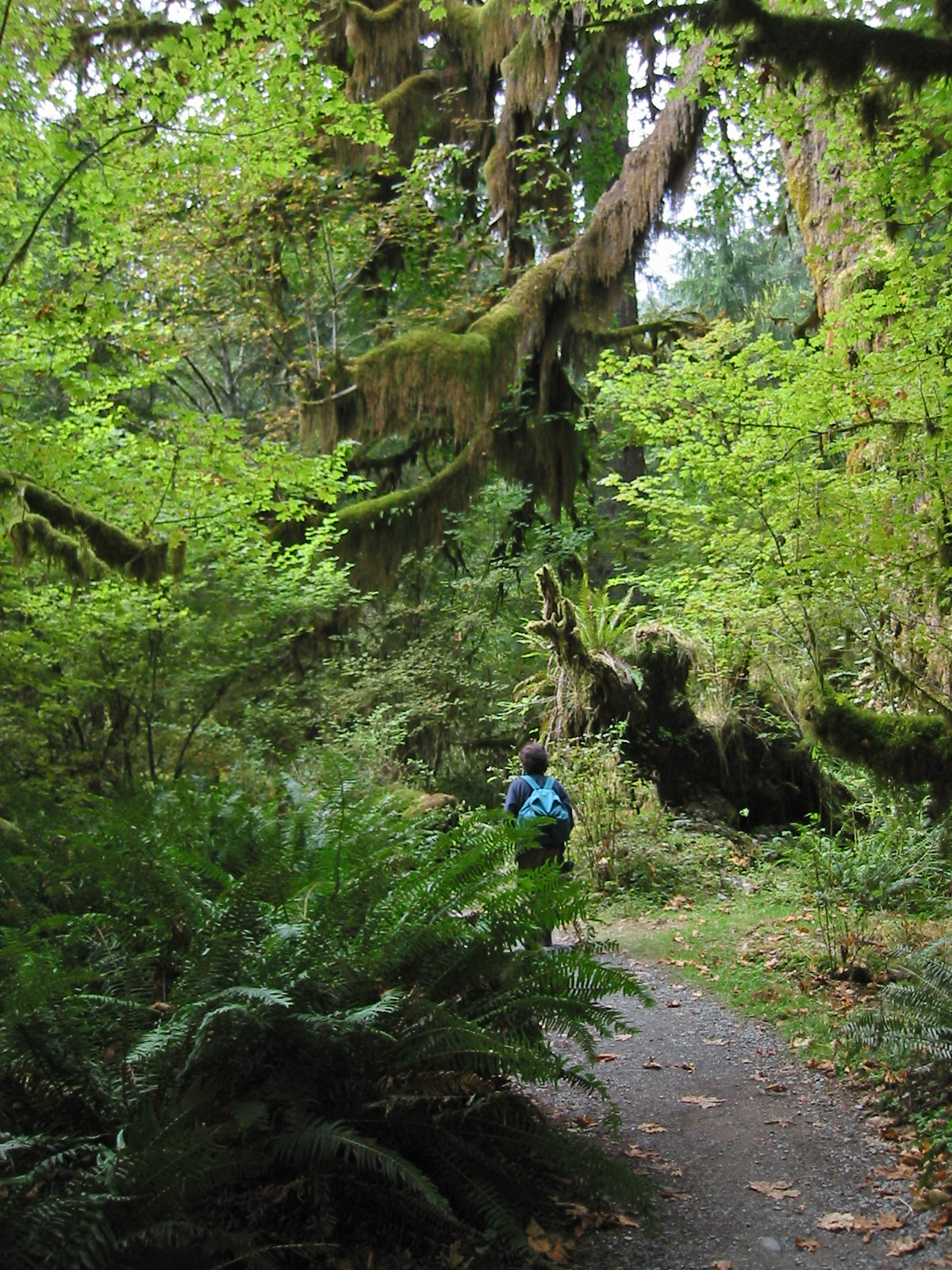
Dense growths of epiphytes and mosses cover the trees, and the understory vegetation is lush.

About 200 million years ago (during the Triassic and Jurassic periods), the landscape was dominated by conifers, which were the most diverse group of trees and constituted the greatest majority of large trees. When flowering plants emerged (in the following Cretaceous period), they quickly prevailed, causing most conifers to become extinct, and those that survived to adapt to harsh conditions.

Perhaps the most significant difference in this change is that the primitive conifers invested their energy in the basic food supply for every seed, with no certainty of fertilization; by contrast, flowering plants create the food supply for a seed only after it is triggered by fertilization.

The Pacific temperate rainforests now remains the only region on Earth of noteworthy size and significance where, due to unique climatic conditions, the conifers flourish as they did before being displaced by flowering plants. The northern Pacific temperate rain forests are relatively young, emerging in the past few thousand years following the retreat of the ice sheets of the last ice age.

== Ecology ==
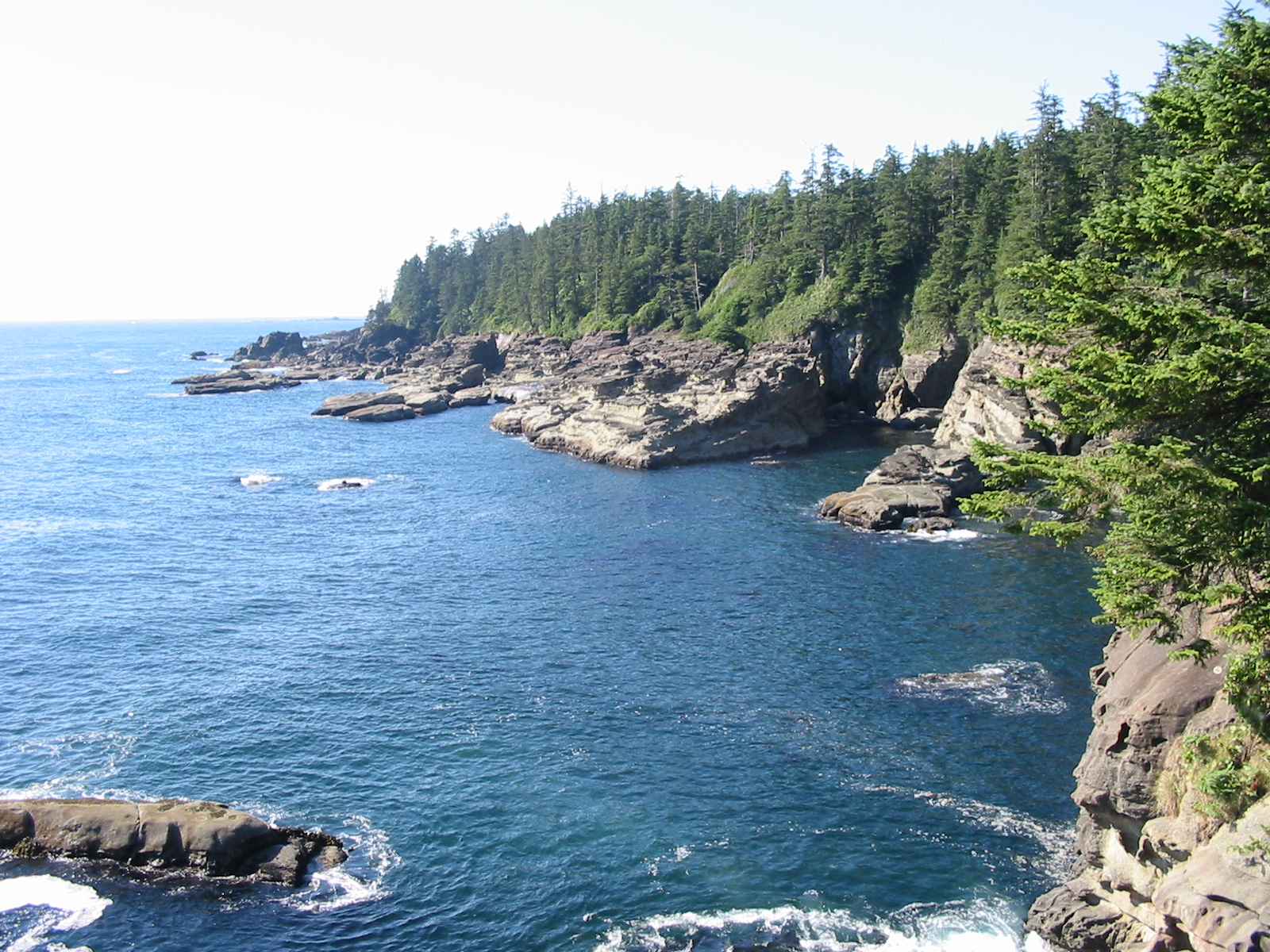
A view of the West Coast Trail, one of the three regions of Pacific Rim National Park Reserve.

The ecosystem of Pacific temperate rainforests is so productive that the biomass on the best sites is at least four times greater than that of any comparable area in the tropics. These forests are more massive than any other ecosystem on the planet with the uncountable mass of both living and decaying material. One of the reasons behind this is the rarity of fire. Unlike drier forests that can catch fire periodically, temperate rainforests experience small-scale disturbances like avalanches and blow-downs.

This type of rainforest has a large latitude range from about 40 degrees north to about 60 degrees north. The climate differences from north to south create a few important forest zones, which are distinct due to the different plant and animal species that reside in them:

- At the southern limit in northern California is the "coast redwood zone".
- Beginning at the California/Oregon border, and extending through the north end of Vancouver Island is the "seasonal rain forest zone". The common tree species are Douglas fir, western red cedar, Sitka spruce, and western hemlock.
- Beyond the northern end of Vancouver Island, is the "perhumid rain forest zone". Douglas fir becomes less of a dominate species, and the forest starts to be mainly composed of western red cedar, Sitka spruce, and western hemlock.
- The Gulf of Alaska begins where the fjords of southeast Alaska end, and marks the transition into the "sub-polar rain forest". Here the forest occupies only a very narrow strip between the ocean and the icy alpine zone. The cedar trees no longer thrive in this harsher climate, and the dominant trees are limited to Sitka spruce, and western and mountain hemlock.
- The northern limits of the rainforest are scattered in thin bands in the northern Prince William Sound, Kenai Fjords, eastern Kodiak Island, and western Cook Inlet.

== Wildlife ==
The first survey that comprehensively documented the forest canopy in the Carmanah Valley of Vancouver Island found 15,000 new species, which is a third of all invertebrates known to exist in all of Canada. Out of that, 500 species that were found were previously unknown to science.

Common individuals include raccoons, opossums, coyotes, black-tailed deer, ensatinas, red foxes, bullfrogs, banana slugs, Roosevelt elk, black slugs, shrew moles, gulls, mice, and numerous other organisms. Moose rarely set foot into these forests, as they prefer colder, drier and snowier biomes, which are found mostly in the inland Western United States compared to the coast. But, there have been small sightings of moose have been reported along the British Columbia coast.

The rain forest exists in a complicated landscape of islands and fjords, and many species depend on both the forest and the ocean. Salmon are one of the primary species of the rainforest, spawning in the forest streams. The marbled murrelet nests in old growth trees at night, but feeds in the ocean during the day.

Grizzly bears and black bears once thrived throughout the rain forest zone and beyond. Black bears can still be found throughout the forest's range, while grizzlies are largely confined to areas north of the Canada–US border. These forests have some of the largest concentrations of grizzly bears in the world due to the region's rich salmon streams. The Great Bear Rainforest in Canada is home to the rare white variant of the black bear known as the Kermode bear, which is also known as the "spirit bear." The endangered spotted owl was at the center of logging controversies in Oregon and Washington. Other wildlife species of note include the bald eagle, marbled murrelet, wolf, mountain lion and sitka deer.

== Logging ==
Pacific temperate rainforests have been subject to ongoing large-scale industrial logging since the end of World War II, cutting over half of their total area. In California, only 4% of the original redwoods have been protected. In Oregon and Washington, less than 10% of the original coastal rainforest area remains.

An even larger percentage of the productive forest has been logged. Much of the land is rock, ice, muskeg, or less productive forest on steep slopes. The stereotypical old growth is limited to lowland flats and valleys, which have been preferentially targeted for logging. Historically, the most common protocol has been to place protected areas in the mountains, leaving the valleys to the timber industry. While some very large areas are protected as parks and monuments, very little of the highest-value habitat has been protected, and much of it has already been cut.

In the Tongass National Forest in the 1950s, in part to aid in Japanese recovery from World War II, the US Forest Service set up long term contracts with two pulp mills: the Ketchikan Pulp Company (KPC) and the Alaska Pulp Company (APC). These contracts were for 50 years, and divided up the forest into areas slated for APC logs and areas slated for KPC logs. These two companies conspired to drive log prices down, conspired to drive smaller logging operations out of business, and were major and recalcitrant polluters of their local areas. These long-term contracts guaranteed low prices to the pulp companies — in some cases resulting in trees being given away for less than the price of a hamburger. Since 1980, the US Forest Service has lost over a billion dollars in Tongass timber sales.

Half a million acres (2,000 km^{2}) of the Tongass was selected by native corporations under the 1971 Alaska Native Claims Settlement Act. Much of this area has been clearcut.

The most controversial timber sales in the Tongass are in the roadless areas. Since 2001, political conflict over roadless area conservation has threatened the fate of the Tongass. In January 2023, the USDA and Forest Service under the Biden administration restored protections of the Tongass National Forest under the roadless rule. In 2025, the second Trump administration announced that it intended to revoke the Tongass's protections.

== See also ==
- Olympic National Park
- Redwood National and State Parks
