= Central Pacific coastal forests =

Temperate coniferous forests ecoregion in Canada and the United States

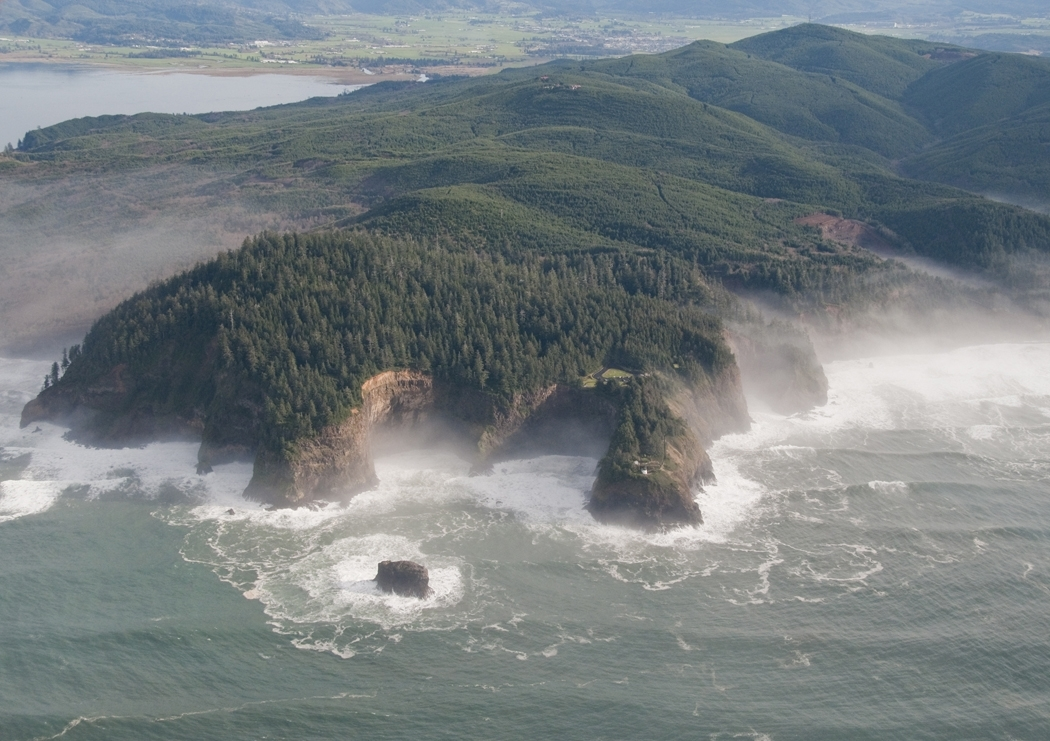
- Sitka spruce forest of Cape Meares, Oregon

Ecology
- Realm: Nearctic
- Biome: Temperate coniferous forests
- Borders: List: British Columbia mainland coastal forests; Klamath-Siskiyou forests; Northern California coastal forests; Puget lowland forests; Willamette Valley forests
- Bird species: 218
- Mammal species: 74

Geography
- Area: 73,815 km^{2} (28,500 mi^{2})
- Countries: Canada; United States
- State/Province: British Columbia; Oregon; Washington
- Climate type: Oceanic (Cfb) and warm-summer Mediterranean (Csb)

Conservation
- Conservation status: Critical/Endangered
- Global 200: Yes
- Habitat loss: 0.4%
- Protected: 28.7%

The Central Pacific coastal forests is a temperate coniferous forest ecoregion located in the Canadian province of British Columbia and the U.S. states of Oregon and Washington, as defined by the World Wildlife Fund (WWF) categorization system.

== Geography ==
The Central Pacific coastal forests stretch from the Chetco River in southwestern Oregon to the northern tip of Vancouver Island in British Columbia. It differs from the Coast Range ecoregion designated by the Environmental Protection Agency of the United States in that it includes the entirety of Vancouver Island and excludes the coastal forests of Northern California.

Major urban centers located within this ecoregion include Coos Bay, Astoria, Aberdeen, Victoria, Nanaimo, Courtenay, and Campbell River.

== Climate ==
North of the Chehalis River Valley of Washington state, the ecoregion features a predominantly oceanic climate (Köppen Cfb) with cool winters, mild summers, and plentiful rainfall throughout the year. South of the Chehalis River Valley and along the east coast of Vancouver Island, the ecoregion has a predominantly Mediterranean climate (Köppen Csb) with fresh, dry, sunny summers and cool winters with moderate precipitation and plentiful cloud cover. Small patches of oceanic climate can be found in the Willapa Hills of Washington state and the northern highlands of the Oregon Coast Range.

== Ecology ==
=== Flora ===
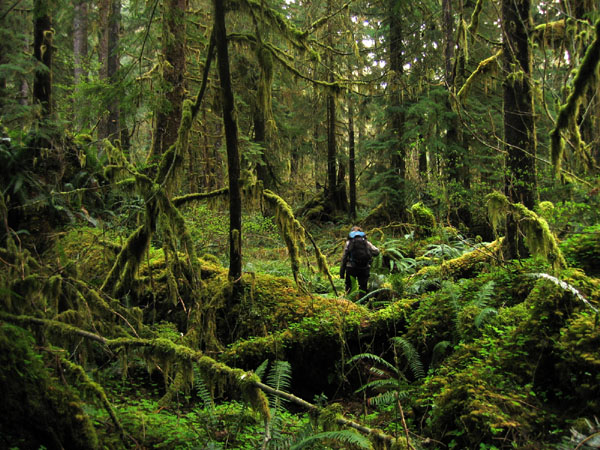
Lush understory of the Hoh Rainforest in Olympic National Park, Washington

The forests of the Central Pacific Coast are among the most productive in the world, characterized by large trees draped lush growths of mosses and lichens, and an abundance of ferns, herbs, and woody debris on the forest floor.

The major forest complex consists of coast Douglas-fir and western hemlock, encompassing seral forests dominated by Douglas-fir and old-growth forests of fir, hemlock, western red cedar, and other species. These forests occur from sea level up to elevations of 700–1,000 metres (2,300–3,300 ft) in the Coast Range and Olympic Mountains. This forest type occupies a wide range of environments with variable composition and structure and includes such other species as grand fir, Pacific silver fir, subalpine fir, Sitka spruce, Port Orford cedar, red alder, paper birch, Pacific yew, bigtooth maple, bigleaf maple, black cottonwood, western white pine and ponderosa pine.

Lower growing species of trees, shrubs, and herbaceous perennials may include: Vine maple, Pacific dogwood, Cascara buckthorn, redosier dogwood, Saskatoon serviceberry, red flowering currant, Cascade barberry, Oregon grape, Lewis' mock orange, red elderberry, Western sword fern, Pacific bleeding heart, western columbine, Redwood sorrel, and deer fern.

Epiphytic species may include different mosses and lichens and epiphytic ferns such as Licorice fern can dominate areas with lots of shade, and wood.

On Vancouver Island, low-elevation coastal forest cover includes stands of western hemlock, Douglas-fir and amabilis fir. Western hemlock, Douglas fir and grand fir characterize most forests of eastern Vancouver Island. Drier sites support stands of western hemlock and western red cedar. The driest areas in eastern Vancouver Island consist of mixed stands of Douglas fir and western hemlock with occasional Garry oak, Pacific dogwood and arbutus. The subalpine forests are composed of mountain hemlock, subalpine fir, amabilis fir and Engelmann spruce, with some yellow cedar and western hemlock in high elevation areas in eastern Vancouver Island.

While hemlock and fir dominate much of the ecoregion, the cool, wet conditions along the coast create a narrow band of forests distinguished by Sitka spruce. With its high tolerance of salt spray, in areas near the ocean Sitka spruce may form nearly pure forests or co-dominate with lodgepole pine. The Sitka spruce zone—in which hemlocks also occur in large numbers—may be only a few kilometers in width and generally occurs below 150 m (490 ft). Where mountains abut the coast, however, Sitka spruce forests may extend up to 600 m (2,000 ft).

Riparian forests of this ecoregion are quite distinct from the Douglas-fir/hemlock forests. Broadleaf species such as black cottonwood and red alder replace the otherwise ubiquitous conifers along the many rivers and streams of the Pacific Northwest. Occasional grasslands, sand dune and strand communities, rush meadows and marshes, and western red cedar and alder swamps break up the conifer forests.

=== Fauna ===
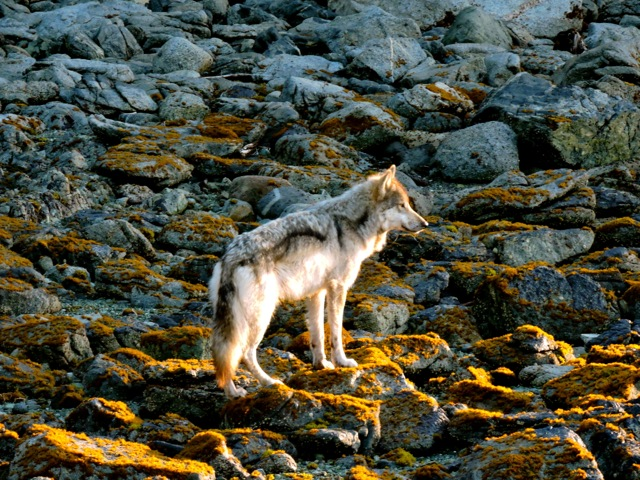
Vancouver Island wolf, a rare subspecies of gray wolf native to Vancouver Island

The Central Pacific Coastal Forests are among the richest temperate coniferous forests in North America for amphibians and birds. Characteristic wildlife include Roosevelt elk, black-tailed deer, black bear, coyote, beaver, raccoon, mink, grouse, and a variety of migratory seabirds and waterfowl.

== Subregions in the United States ==
The Environmental Protection Agency has defined sub-ecoregions in the United States portion of this ecoregion.

=== Coastal lowlands ===
The Coastal Lowlands ecoregion contains beaches, sand dunes and spits, and low marine terraces below 400 feet (122 m) elevation. Characteristic features include wet forests, shallow freshwater lakes, estuarine marshes, and low-gradient, meandering tannic streams and rivers. Residential, commercial, and recreational developments are expanding in the coastal corridor. Many wetlands in the floodplains of the region's streams have been drained and converted into pastures for dairy farms, and associated stream degradation has occurred. Mature forests in the region are dominated by a canopy of Sitka spruce, western hemlock, and Douglas-fir, with salal, sword fern, vine maple, and Oregon grape in the shrub layer. The riparian zone supports red alder, western redcedar, and bigleaf maple with an understory of salmonberry; California bay-laurel is common in the south.

Estuaries and coastal wetlands may feature Baltic rush, Lyngby's sedge, tufted hairgrass, Pacific silverleaf, and seaside arrowgrass with shore pine, sweet gale, and Hooker's willow. Stabilized dunes support shore pine over salal, rhododendron, and evergreen blueberry, with dune wildrye, Chilean strawberry, and dune bentgrass. Soil textures range from silty clay loam to sandy loam.

The region covers 633 square miles (1,639 km^{2}) in Oregon and 353 square miles (914 km^{2}) in Washington, with the largest contiguous areas found near Grays Harbor, Willapa Bay, the mouth of the Columbia River, Tillamook Bay, and along the southern Oregon Coast. Public lands include the Grays Harbor, Willapa, Nestucca Bay, Siletz Bay, and Bandon Marsh National Wildlife Refuges, the Oregon Dunes National Recreation Area, and numerous state parks.

=== Coastal uplands ===
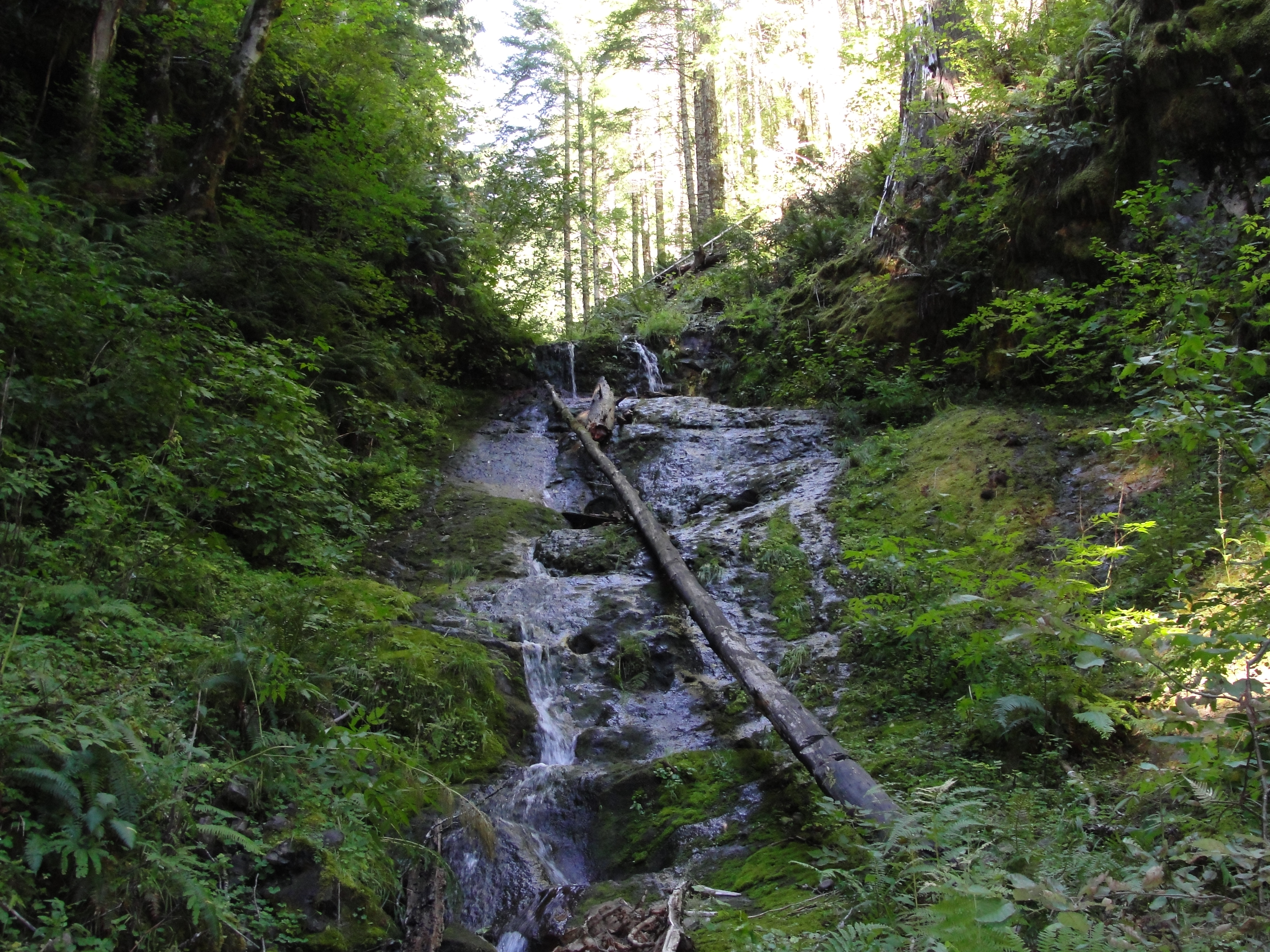
Drift Creek, Oregon (elevation 1,200 ft or 370 m)

The Coastal Uplands ecoregion includes the headlands, high marine terraces, hills, and low mountains surrounding the Coastal Lowlands, with medium to high gradient tannic streams. Elevation varies from 400 to 2500 feet (120 to 760 m). The climate is marine-influenced with an extended winter rainy season and minimal seasonal temperature extremes. Abundant fog during the summer dry season reduces vegetation moisture stress. The Uplands region roughly corresponds with the historic distribution of Sitka spruce.

After extensive logging, most of the Sitka spruce is gone, and today the forests are dominated by Douglas-fir and western hemlock, with a shrub layer of salal, sword fern, vine maple, Oregon grape, rhododendron, and evergreen blueberry. Wetter slopes and riparian areas feature red alder, bigleaf maple, and western redcedar, with a salmonberry and currant understory. The headlands are covered by grasslands. The region is nearly three times the size of the Coastal Lowlands, covering 1,431 square miles (3,706 km^{2}) in Washington and 1,117 square miles (2,893 km^{2}) in Oregon. Public lands include the Drift Creek Wilderness, the Siuslaw National Forest, and the Lewis and Clark and Cape Meares national wildlife refuges.

=== Low Olympics ===
The Low Olympics ecoregion contains foothills and lower mountains of the Olympic Range, with U-shaped valleys and high gradient streams. It rises to an elevation of approximately 4,000 feet (1,219 m). Higher areas were glaciated. Copious precipitation (up to 200 inches (5,080 mm) a year) supports a lush, epiphyte-rich rainforest of western hemlock, western red cedar, and Douglas-fir, with Pacific silver fir at higher elevations.

Riparian zones support red alder and bigleaf maple forests. Much of the region is in the third rotation of logging, including land within the Olympic National Forest. However, a portion of the region lies within Olympic National Park and contains ancient forests with extremely high biomass. The region covers 1,685 square miles (4,364 km^{2}), entirely on the Olympic Peninsula of Washington. The higher elevations of the Olympic Mountains to the east are designated as part of the North Cascades ecoregion.

=== Volcanics ===
The Volcanics ecoregion consists of steeply sloping mountains and capes underlain by fractured basaltic rocks. Elevation generally varies from 600 to 4100 feet (180 to 1250 m), although in some places the volcanic rock extends down to sea level. The region is marked by columnar and pillow basalt outcrops. Its mountains may have been offshore seamounts engulfed by continental sediments about 200 million years ago. High gradient, cascading streams and rivers occur, and the basaltic substrate preserves summer flows that are more consistent than streams on the sedimentary rocks in surrounding ecoregions. The streams still support runs of spring chinook salmon and summer steelhead. The region's Douglas-fir plantations are heavily logged. Mature forests consist of Douglas-fir, western hemlock, salal, sword fern, vine maple, Oregon grape, and rhododendron.

Wetter slopes and riparian areas may support western redcedar, bigleaf maple, red alder, salmonberry, and oxalis. Grassy coastal headlands and mountaintop balds feature Roemer's fescue, thin bentgrass, California oatgrass, and diverse forbs. This large but disjunct ecoregion covers 2,043 square miles (5,291 km^{2}) in Oregon and 1,542 square miles (3,994 km^{2}) in Washington, including parts of the Olympic and Siuslaw National Forests and the Cummins Creek and Rock Creek Wildernesses, as well as higher elevations in the Cape Meares National Wildlife Refuge.

=== Outwash ===
The Outwash ecoregion is a gently sloping fan of glacial outwash material that forms a series of undulating terraces and plateaus. Elevation varies from 20 to 1000 feet (6 to 300 m). The region lies outside the zone of marine influence, and its medium gradient streams and rivers have lower summer flow than most other parts of the Coast Range. Mature forest types include Douglas-fir, western hemlock, red alder, bigleaf maple, and western red cedar, but today the region is largely dominated by industrial timber plantations. It is the smallest of the Coast Range subregions, covering 354 square miles (917 km^{2}) in Grays Harbor County north of Aberdeen, Washington.

=== Willapa Hills ===
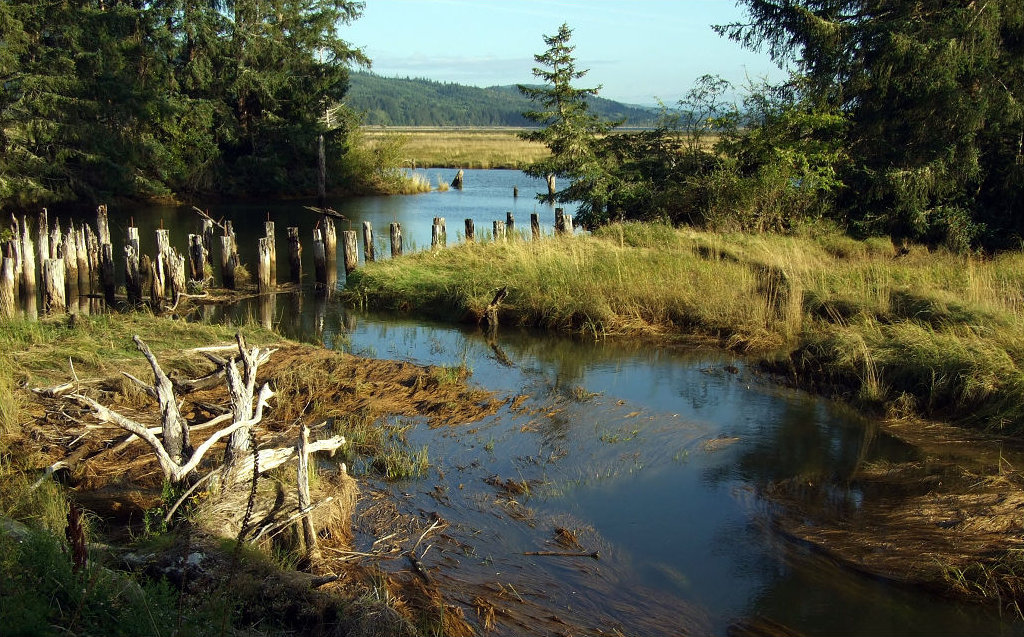
Willapa bay and hills

The Willapa Hills ecoregion (named for the Willapa Hills) consists of low, rolling hills and low, gently sloping mountains with medium gradient streams and rivers. It rises to an elevation of approximately 1,300 feet (396 m). This region has a lower drainage density than other upland areas in the Coast Range. Logging is relatively easy and less expensive in this accessible terrain, and industrial timberland has almost completely replaced the historic forests. When disturbed, the silt- and clay-textured soils are easily eroded, thereby degrading stream quality. The vegetation consists of Douglas-fir and western hemlock forests, with sword fern, vine maple, salal, Oregon grape, and rhododendron shrub layer. Wetter slopes and riparian areas support red alder, western redcedar, bigleaf maple, salmonberry, and oxalis. Large herds of Roosevelt elk winter in the region. The region covers 1,277 square miles (3,307 km^{2}) in southwestern Washington and 751 square miles (1,945 km^{2}) in northwestern Oregon, inland from the coast.

=== Mid-coastal sedimentary ===
The mountainous Mid-Coastal Sedimentary ecoregion lies outside of the coastal fog zone and is typically underlain by massive beds of sandstone and siltstone. Elevation varies from 300 to 3000 feet (90 to 900 m). The region is more rugged than the geologically similar Willapa Hills. Its Douglas-fir forests are intensively managed for logging, and the slopes are prone to failure when disturbed, particularly south of the Siuslaw River. Stream sedimentation is higher than in the Volcanics ecoregion. The mature forest consists of Douglas-fir and western hemlock, with salal, sword fern, vine maple, Oregon grape, and rhododendron; tanoak may be found on drier slopes to the south. Wetter slopes and riparian areas support bigleaf maple, western redcedar, grand fir, red alder, salmonberry, and oxalis, with California bay-laurel in the south. This is the largest of the Coast Range subregions, covering 3,739 square miles (9,684 km^{2}) in the Central and Southern Oregon Coast Range.

=== Southern Oregon coastal mountains ===
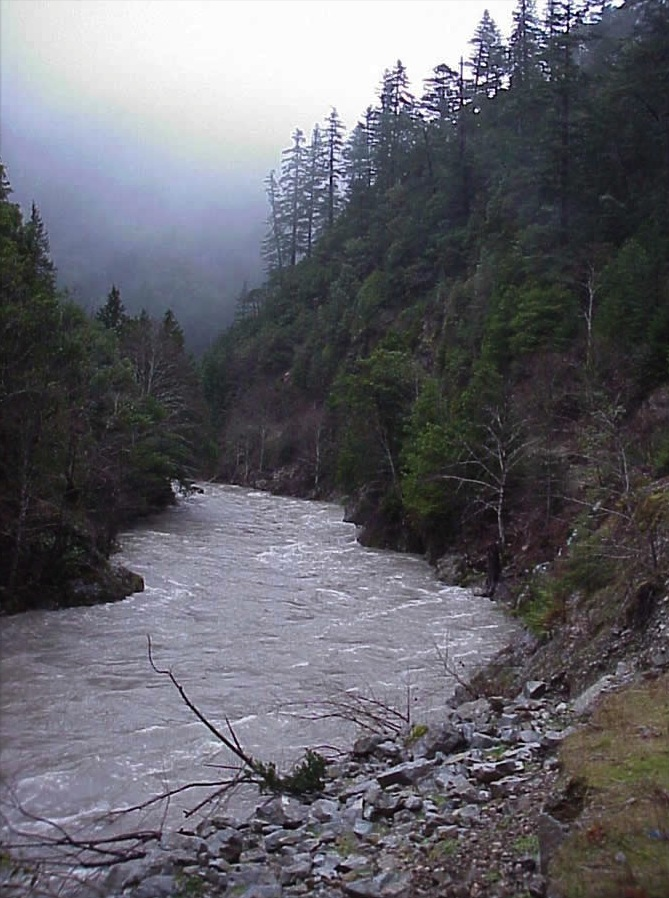
Elk River

The Southern Oregon Coastal Mountains ecoregion is a geologically and botanically diverse ecoregion that is a transition zone between the Coast Range and the Siskiyou Mountains, which form part of the Klamath Mountains ecoregion to the east. Rising to an elevation of approximately 4,000 feet (1,219 m), this region has the climate of the Coast Range but the varied lithology of the higher, more dissected Siskiyou Mountains, underlain by Jurassic sandstone, metamorphosed sediments, granite, and serpentinite. Distributions of northern and southern vegetation blend together here and species diversity is high. Douglas-fir, western hemlock, tanoak, Port Orford cedar, and western redcedar are present, along with salal, sword fern, vine maple, Oregon grape, rhododendron, California bay-laurel, bigleaf maple, grand fir, red alder, salmonberry, and oxalis. The region covers 692 square miles (1,792 km^{2}) in a remote area of Curry County in southwestern Oregon containing the Sixes and Elk River drainages. It includes Grassy Knob Wilderness within the Siskiyou National Forest.

== Conservation ==
Several relatively large blocks of more or less intact habitat remain, as do a number of smaller patches. Human activities have significantly altered nearly all habitats outside the parks.

Notable protected areas include:

- Brooks Peninsula Provincial Park
- Cape Scott Provincial Park
- Carmanah Walbran Provincial Park
- Elliott State Forest
- Olympic National Park
- Pacific Rim National Park Reserve
- Strathcona Provincial Park

== See also ==
- Coast Range (EPA ecoregion)
- List of ecoregions in Canada (WWF)
- List of ecoregions in the United States (WWF)
