= British Columbia Coast =

Coastal region of British Columbia, Canada

British Columbia Coast French: Côte de la Colombie-Britannique
- Region
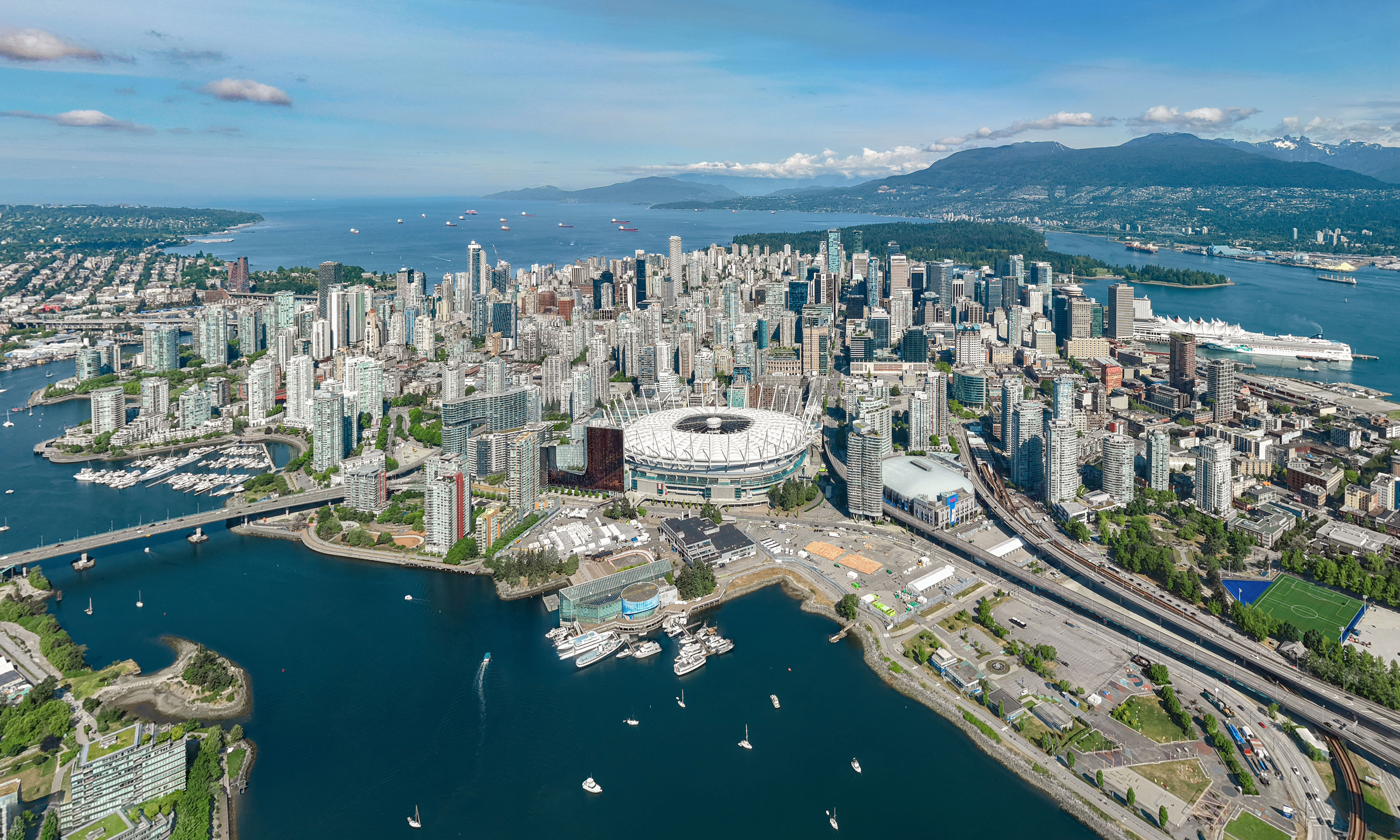
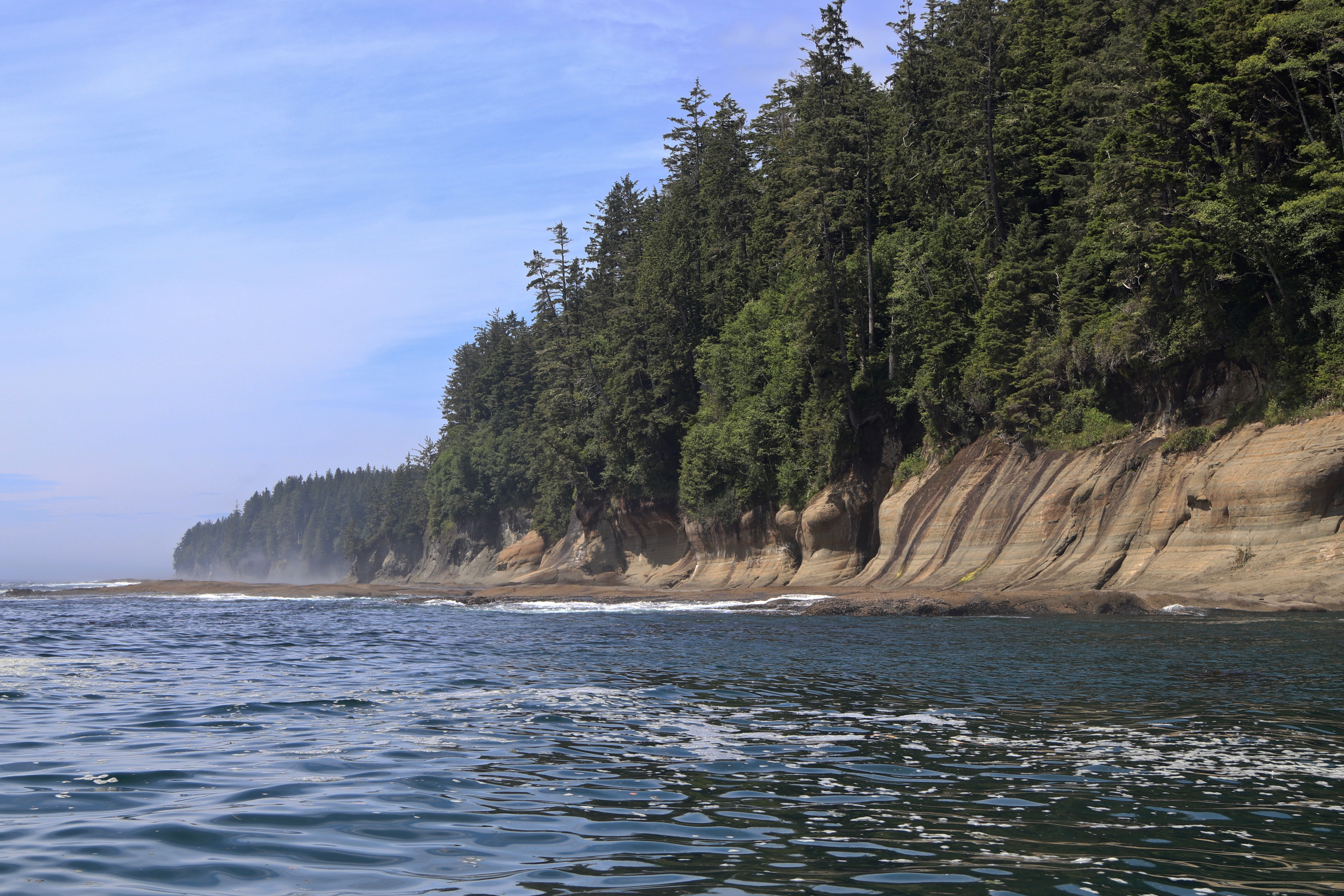
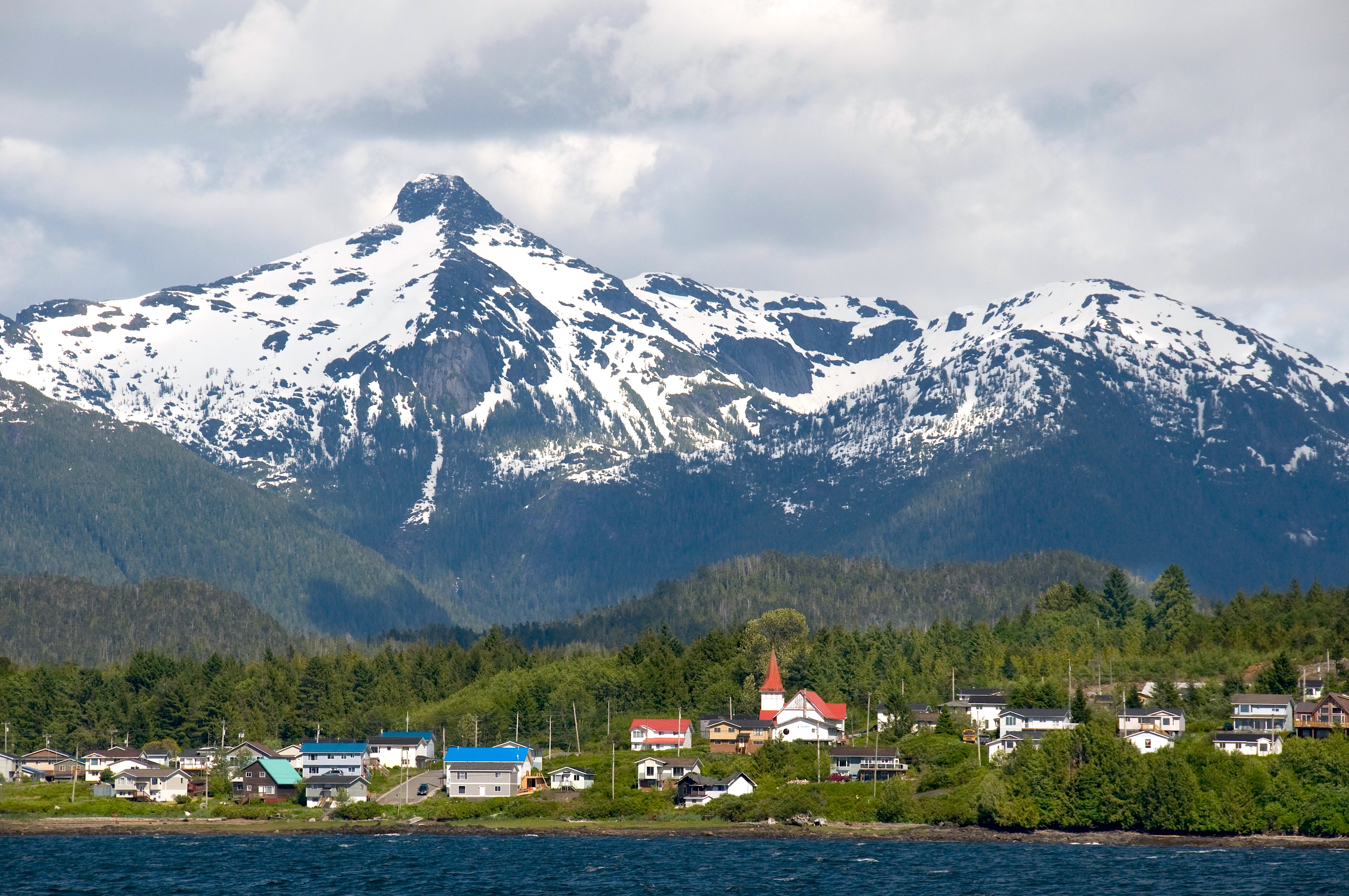
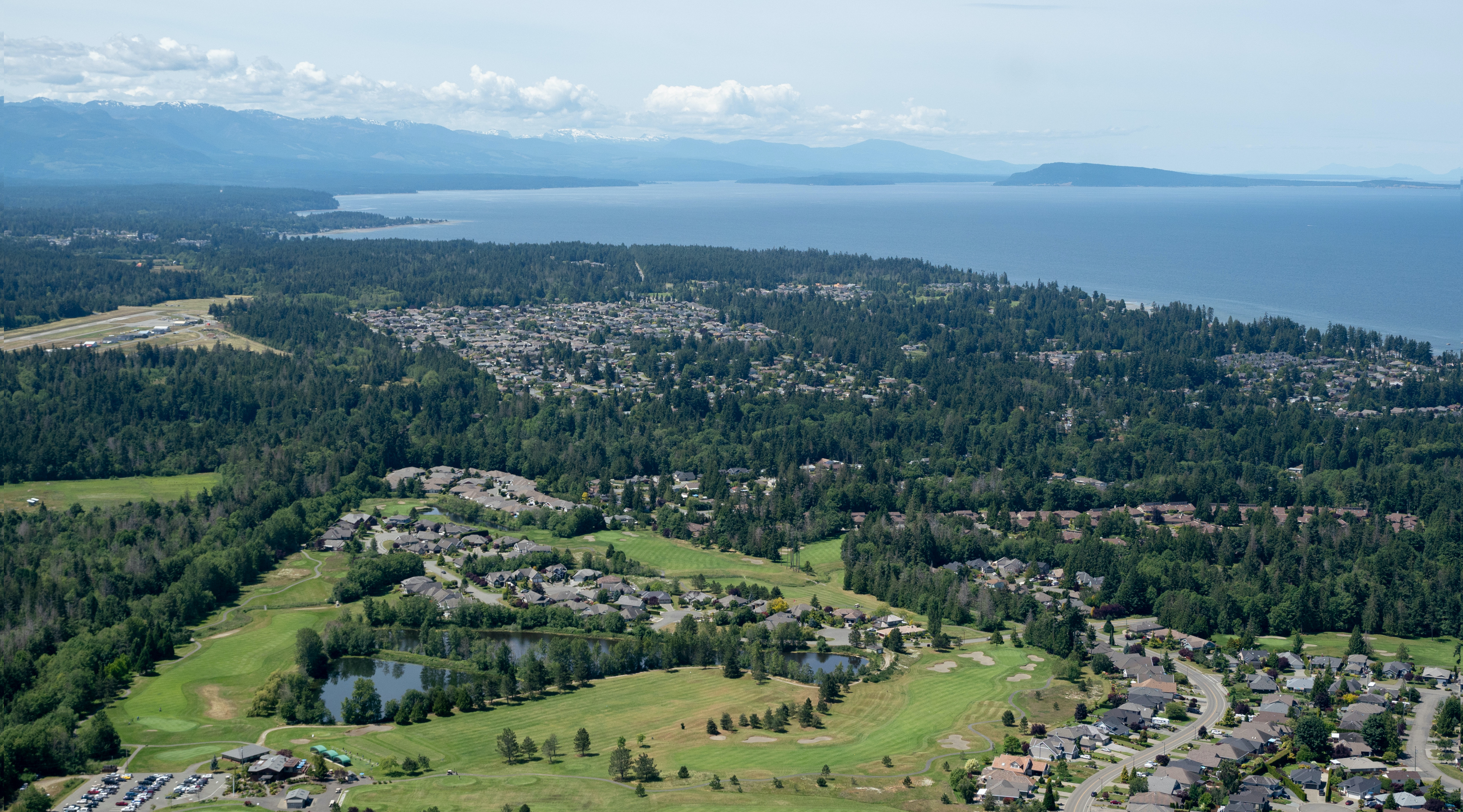
- From top, left to right: Vancouver, Pacific Rim National Park Reserve, Lax Kw'alaams backdropped by the Kitimat Ranges, Qualicum Beach and the Strait of Georgia
- Nickname: "The Coast"
- Country: Canada
- Province: British Columbia
- Principal cities: List: Vancouver; Surrey; Burnaby; Richmond; Abbotsford; Coquitlam; Delta; Nanaimo; Victoria; Chilliwack; Maple Ridge; New Westminster; Port Coquitlam; North Vancouver

Area
  - 15 Districts: 244,778 km^{2} (94,509 sq mi)
- Highest elevation Mt. Waddington: 4,019 m (13,186 ft)
- Lowest elevation Sea level: 0 m (0 ft)

Population (2016)
  - Total: 3,686,900
  - Density: 80.24/km^{2} (207.8/sq mi)
- Time zone: UTC−08:00 (PST)
  - Summer (DST): UTC−07:00 (PDT)
- Postal code prefixes: V
- Area codes: 236, 250, 604, 672, 778

The British Columbia Coast, popularly referred to as the BC Coast or simply the Coast, is a geographic region of the Canadian province of British Columbia. As the entire western continental coastline of Canada along the Pacific Ocean is part of the province, it is synonymous with being the West Coast of Canada.

The region is generally defined to include the 15 regional districts that have coastline along the Pacific Ocean or Salish Sea, or are part of the Lower Mainland, a subregion of the British Columbia Coast. Other boundaries may exclude parts of or even entire regional districts, such as those of the aforementioned Lower Mainland.

== Boundaries ==
While the term British Columbia Coast has been recorded from the earliest period of non-native settlement in British Columbia, it has never been officially defined. The term has been popular for over a century to describe a region of the province that extends west from the Coast Mountains and North Cascades. This definition makes the term British Columbia Coast largely synonymous with the 15 regional districts that have territory in this region.

== Major subregions ==
Among locals, the British Columbia Coast can further be divided into seven major subregions:

- Vancouver Island: Includes Vancouver Island, the Gulf Islands, and sometimes Quadra Island.
- Lower Mainland: Includes Greater Vancouver, Fraser Valley, and sometimes the Sea-to-Sky Corridor.
- Sunshine Coast: Includes the islands and mainland coast between Howe Sound and Desolation Sound.
- South Coast: Includes the Lower Mainland and Sunshine Coast, but excludes Vancouver Island. This subregion is closely associated with the Salish Sea.
- Central Coast: Includes the islands and mainland coast between Desolation Sound and Cape Caution. This subregion is sparsely populated and is represented by the regional districts of Strathcona and Mount Waddington. The northern limit of this subregion is often extended northward to the Don Peninsula to include Central Coast Regional District.
- North Coast: Includes the islands and mainland coast between Cape Caution and Portland Canal. This subregion is represented by the regional districts of Central Coast, Kitimat–Stikine, and North Coast. This subregion is closely associated with the Great Bear Rainforest.
- Haida Gwaii: Includes the Haida Gwaii archipelago, which located about 90 km (56 mi) west of the mainland North Coast.

== History ==
Research from the 1990s has indicated that the Ice Age-era coastline of the British Columbia Coast was lower by about 100 m (330 ft). The effect of the sea level on the coastline was such that Queen Charlotte Sound, which is between Haida Gwaii and the northern end of Vancouver Island, was a coastal plain and the straits inland from it were mountain valleys.

Underwater archaeology has shown the presence of permanent human habitations and other activity at the 100 m (330 ft) contour, and the Ice Age existence of such a coastal plain has put a new light on Ice Age populations in North America as well as on the strong likelihood of this area having been the major migration route from (and perhaps to) Asia.

The heavy indentation and mild climate of the British Columbia Coast have led to inevitable comparisons with the geography's predisposition to encouraging increased human settlement and movement as well as cultural foment and population growth in the Aegean, the Irish Sea/Hebrides and in the Danish Archipelago and adjoining Scandinavian coasts.

The natural fecundity of the environment – rich in seafood, wild game, and greenery – combined with the ease of travel (by water) is seen in all cases (British Columbia, Denmark, Greece) to have generated a dynamic and gifted civilization. There are comparisons to be made between the artistic and political and social level of the Pacific Northwest Peoples and those of pre-Conversion pagan Scandinavia, Ireland and Archaic-Era Greece.

== Geography ==
The British Columbia Coast stretches from the southern tip of Vancouver Island along the Strait of Juan de Fuca to the unincorporated community of Stewart at the head of Portland Canal. The aerial distance between these two points is approximately 954 km (593 mi). However, due to its deeply incised coastline and over 40,000 islands of varying sizes, the total length of the British Columbia Coast is over 25,725 km (15,985 mi), which is approximately 10% of the Canadian coastline. This coastal geography is shared with the neighbouring U.S. states of Alaska and Washington.

The dominant landforms are the Insular Mountains of Vancouver Island and Haida Gwaii, and the Coast Mountains that stretch along the entire length of the coast. The proximity of these mountains to the coast produce fjords that rival those of Norway in length and depth. Several large islands fill the strait between Vancouver Island and the Mainland with Texada Island, Cortes Island, and Salt Spring Island being the largest in size. Fjords of note include Burrard Inlet, Burke Channel, Howe Sound, Jervis Inlet, Desolation Sound, Dean Channel, Douglas Channel, and Portland Inlet.

=== Climate ===
The BC Coast is dominated by a moderate oceanic climate (Köppen: Cfb) with warm summers, cool winters, and constant rainfall that peaks during the winter months. These areas enjoy the mildest winter weather in all of Canada, as temperatures rarely fall below freezing.

The southernmost region of the coast (surrounding the Salish Sea) features a warm-summer Mediterranean climate with warm, dry summers and cool, wet winters. This gradually transitions to a predominantly oceanic climate in the north along the coast and further inland into the foothills of the Pacific Ranges. Higher elevations feature a subpolar oceanic climate (Köppen: Cfc) with cool summers, cold winters, and constant rainfall that peaks during the winter months. The highest elevations feature a subarctic climate (Köppen: Dfc).

=== Ecology ===
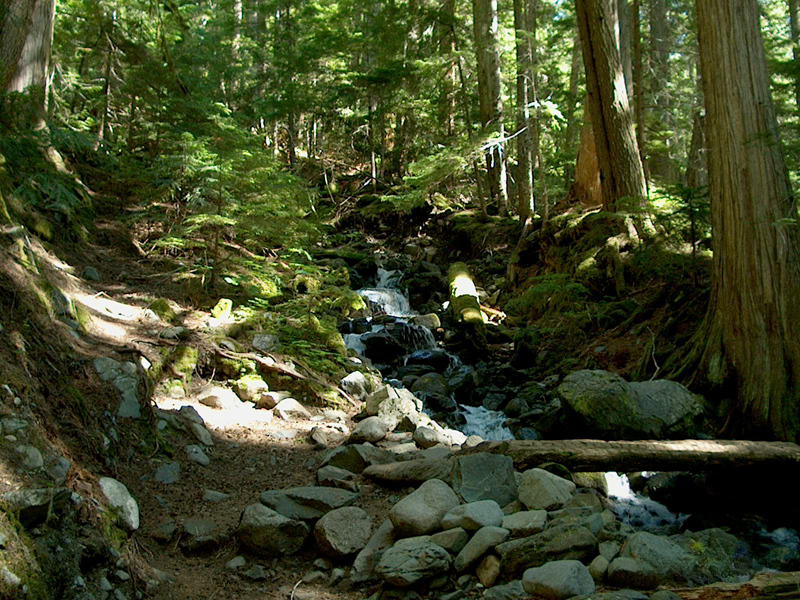
Temperate rainforest ecosystem in Garibaldi Provincial Park

The British Columbia Coast is dominated by temperate rainforest. According to the ecoregion system used by the World Wide Fund for Nature (WWF), the BC Coast is part of five distinct ecoregions: Puget lowland forests, Central Pacific coastal forests, British Columbia mainland coastal forests, Haida Gwaii coastal forests, and Pacific Coastal Mountain icefields and tundra.

According to the ecozone system used by Environment and Climate Change Canada (ECCC), the BC Coast is part of four distinct ecozones: Pacific Coastal Mountains, Coastal Western Hemlock-Sitka Spruce Forests, Pacific and Nass Ranges, and Strait of Georgia/Puget Lowland.

According to the British Columbia Ministry of Forests, which uses an ecosystem classification system independent of the WWF and ECCC, the BC Coast is part of two distinct biogeoclimatic zones: Coastal Western Hemlock and Coastal Douglas-fir.

== Demographics ==
=== Regional districts ===
Below are the 15 regional districts of British Columbia defined as being in the Coast region:

British Columbia regional districts as of January 29, 2020
Name	Population (2016)	Area (km^{2})	Density (/km^{2})	Head office location
Alberni-Clayoquot	30,981	6,588	4.7	Port Alberni
Capital	383,360	2,340	163.8	Victoria
Central Coast	3,319	24,492	0.14	Bella Coola
Comox Valley	66,527	1,701	39.1	Courtenay
Cowichan Valley	83,739	3,475	24.1	Duncan
Fraser Valley	295,934	13,335	22.2	Chilliwack
Kitimat–Stikine	37,367	104,461	0.36	Terrace
Metro Vancouver	2,463,431	2,883	854.5	Burnaby
Mount Waddington	11,035	20,244	0.55	Port McNeill
Nanaimo	155,698	2,038	76.4	Nanaimo
North Coast	18,133	19,781	0.92	Prince Rupert
qathet	20,070	5,075	4.0	Powell River
Squamish-Lillooet	42,665	16,310	2.6	Pemberton
Strathcona	44,671	18,278	2.4	Campbell River
Sunshine Coast	29,970	3,777	7.9	Sechelt

== Culture ==
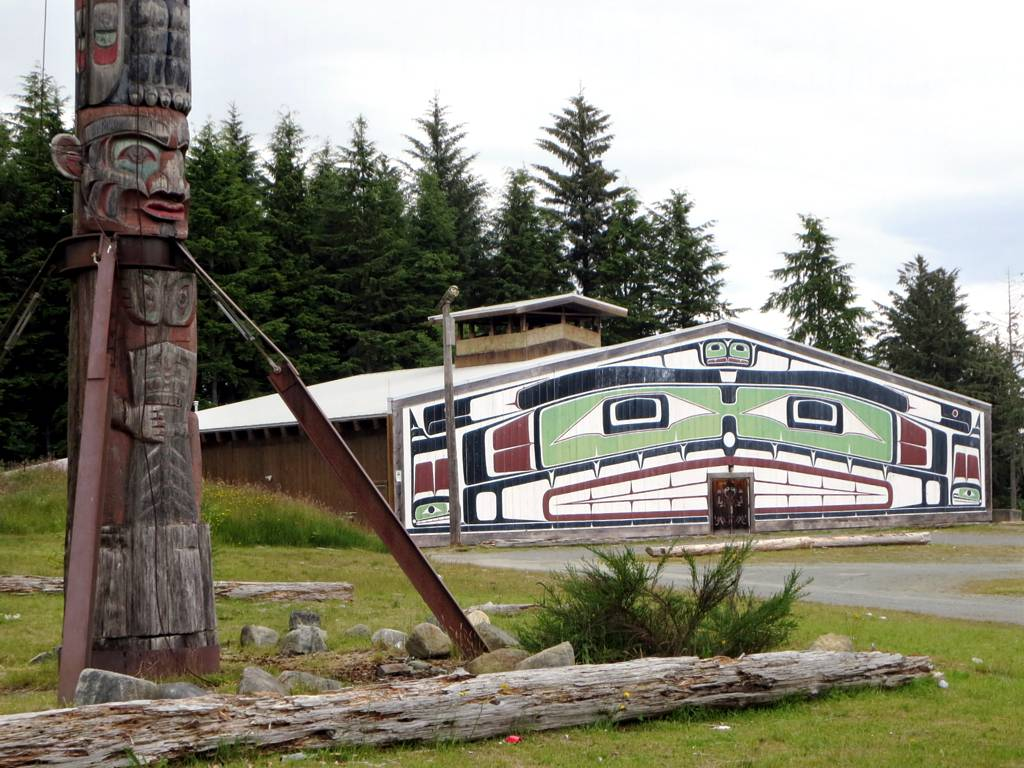
ʼNamgis Big House and totem pole near Alert Bay

== Economy ==
=== Fishing ===
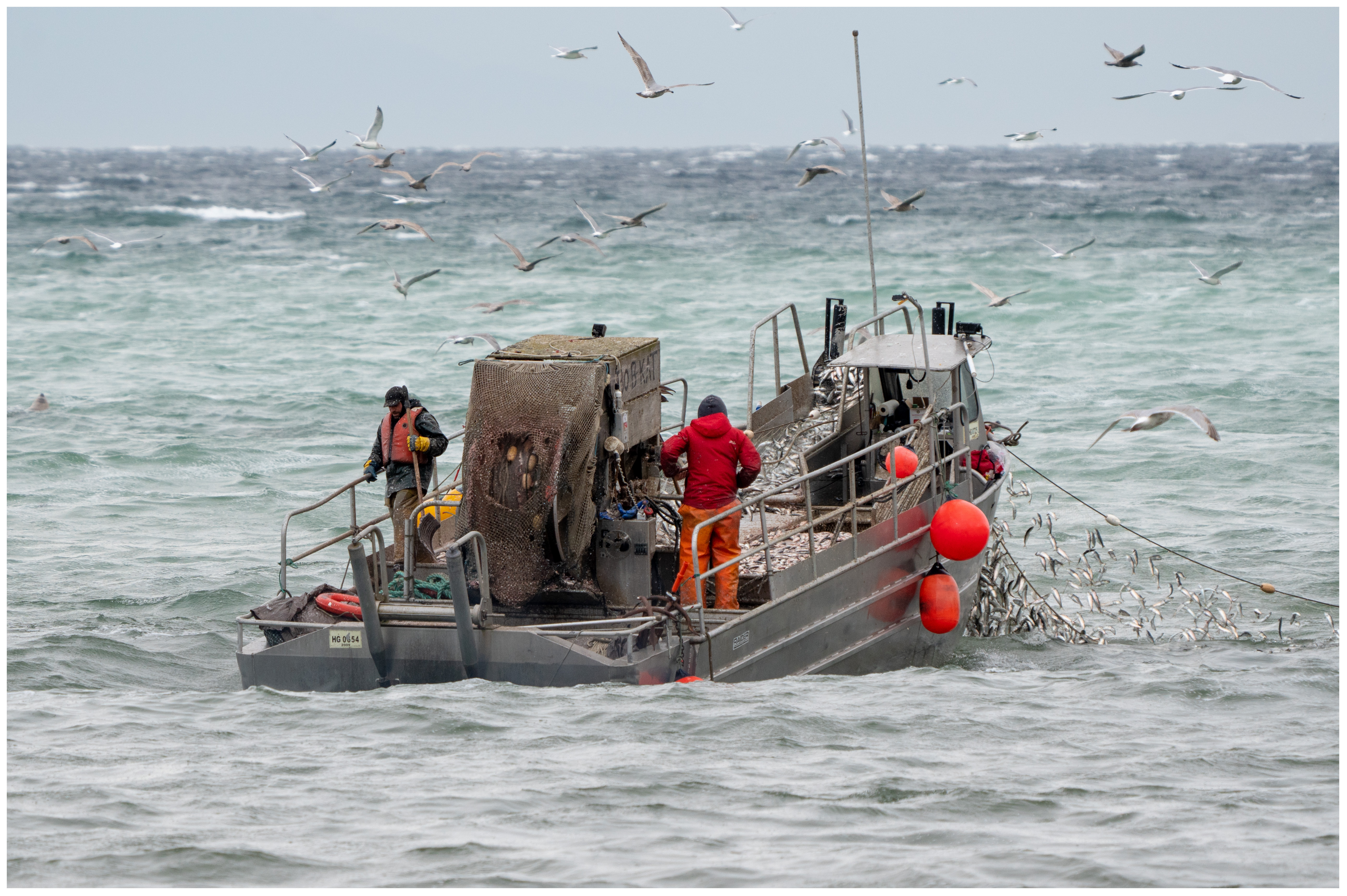
Trawling for herring in the Salish Sea

The fishery of the Pacific Northwest Coast is legendary, especially for its many salmon runs and the cultures that built on top of them throughout the region. Salmon runs have greatly diminished since pre-Contact years and the advent of commercial canning. Ultimately, high-seas fishing has depleted the salmonid productions.

Other commercial fisheries include halibut, herring and herring roe, sea urchin and other specialty sushis, hake, haddock, cod, crab and shellfish.

== Transportation ==
=== Highways ===
The Coast Region of B.C is connected to the rest of B.C by various roads depending on the region.

The populous Fraser Valley and Lower Mainland is linked to the rest of the province by Highway 1 (Fraser Canyon Highway), Highway 5 (Coquihalla Freeway), Highway 3 (Crowsnest Highway) and Highway 99 (Sea to Sky Highway), which was built for the 2010 Olympic Games. The Lower Mainland is also connected to the U.S. by four highway border crossings with the Peace Arch on Interstate 5 being the largest. Several freeways connect lower mainland communities together.

The backbone of Vancouver Island's highway network is the Highway 19 which along with a portion of Highway 1 forms the Island Highway. The Island highway is a mix of 4-lane freeway, 4 lane arterial highway and 2 lane highway running roughly along the east shore of Vancouver Island. Access to the west coast of Vancouver Island can be accomplished by crossing mountain passes on Highway 4 to Tofino and Highway 28 to Gold River. Thousands of other roads ranging from small freeways near Victoria to logging roads exist all over the Island.

Although the Sunshine Coast is on the mainland it is connected to the highway network only by ferries. It has one route which is Highway 101, a narrow curvy 2 lane road split in two by a ferry crossing. Texada Island, a large island off the Sunshine Coast and has its own network of highway standard roads although they are unnumbered.

Owing to the challenging topography of the British Columbia Coast, there is no north–south highway linking the coastal communities of the province between Port Hardy and Kitimat. Instead, travellers utilize one of the coastal ferry lines operated by BC Ferries. The exceptions are Bella Coola is accessible by a long largely gravel Highway 20 from the B.C interior over a high pass; and the towns of Terrace, Prince Rupert and Kitimat which is assessed from the B.C. interior on Highway 16.

Haida Gwaii has an extension of Highway 16 on it, one of Haida Gwaii's few paved roads.

=== Maritime routes ===
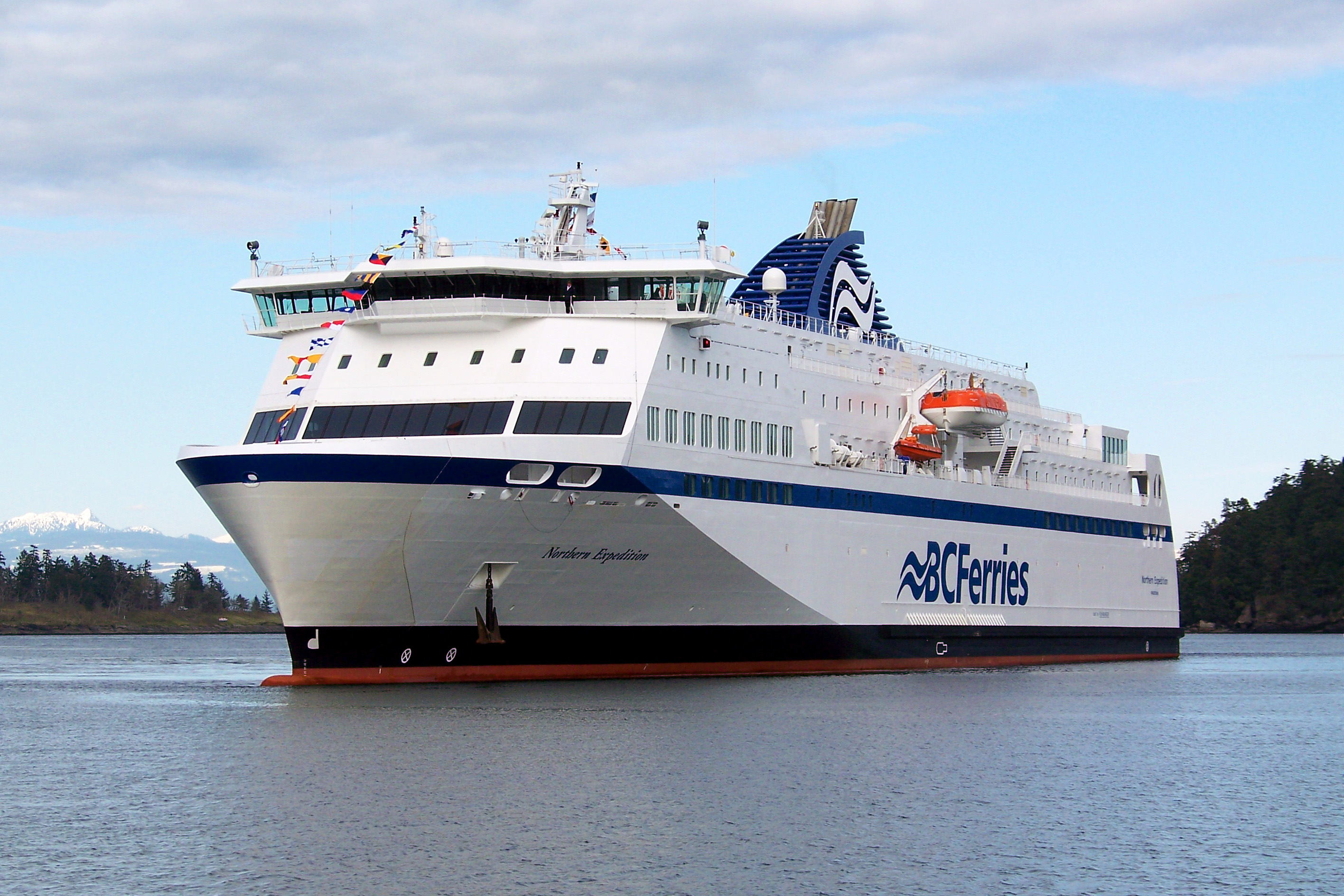
BC Ferries' Northern Expedition sails daily along the Inside Passage route connecting Prince Rupert and Port Hardy.

The sheltered waterways of the British Columbia Coast form part of the Inside Passage, a coastal maritime route along which vessels navigate to avoid the rough waters and bad weather of the open North Pacific. As such, the maritime route is heavily trafficked by cruise ships, cargo ships, ferries, and other marine vessels.

BC Ferries, an independently managed publicly owned company, operates scheduled daily crossings between major population centres throughout the British Columbia Coast. Dozens of smaller ferries ply lesser routes within and between these regions. The Alaska Marine Highway also operates nonstop ferry service through the British Columbia Coast along its Bellingham-Ketchikan route.

=== Ports ===
The Port of Vancouver is the largest commercial shipping port in all of Canada and along the entire Pacific Ocean / Pacific coast of North America by metric tons, which handles a total cargo volume of 76.5 million metric tons. By the same metric, the Port of Vancouver is also the fifth largest commercial shipping port in North America.

The Port of Prince Rupert possesses the deepest ice-free natural harbour in North America, and the 3rd deepest natural harbour in the world. Situated at 54° North, the harbour is the northwesternmost port in North America linked to the continent's railway network. The port is the first inbound and last outbound port of call for some cargo ships travelling between eastern Asia and western North America since it is the closest North American port to key Asian destinations.

=== Rail ===
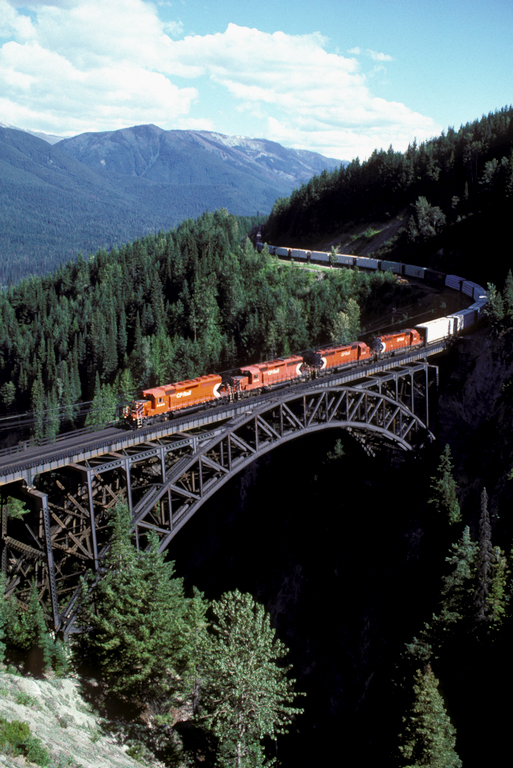
CPR train traversing the Stoney Creek Bridge

== See also ==
- Atlantic Canada
- British Columbia Interior
- Pacific Northwest
