= Willamette Valley (ecoregion) =

Temperate broadleaf and mixed forests ecoregion of the United States

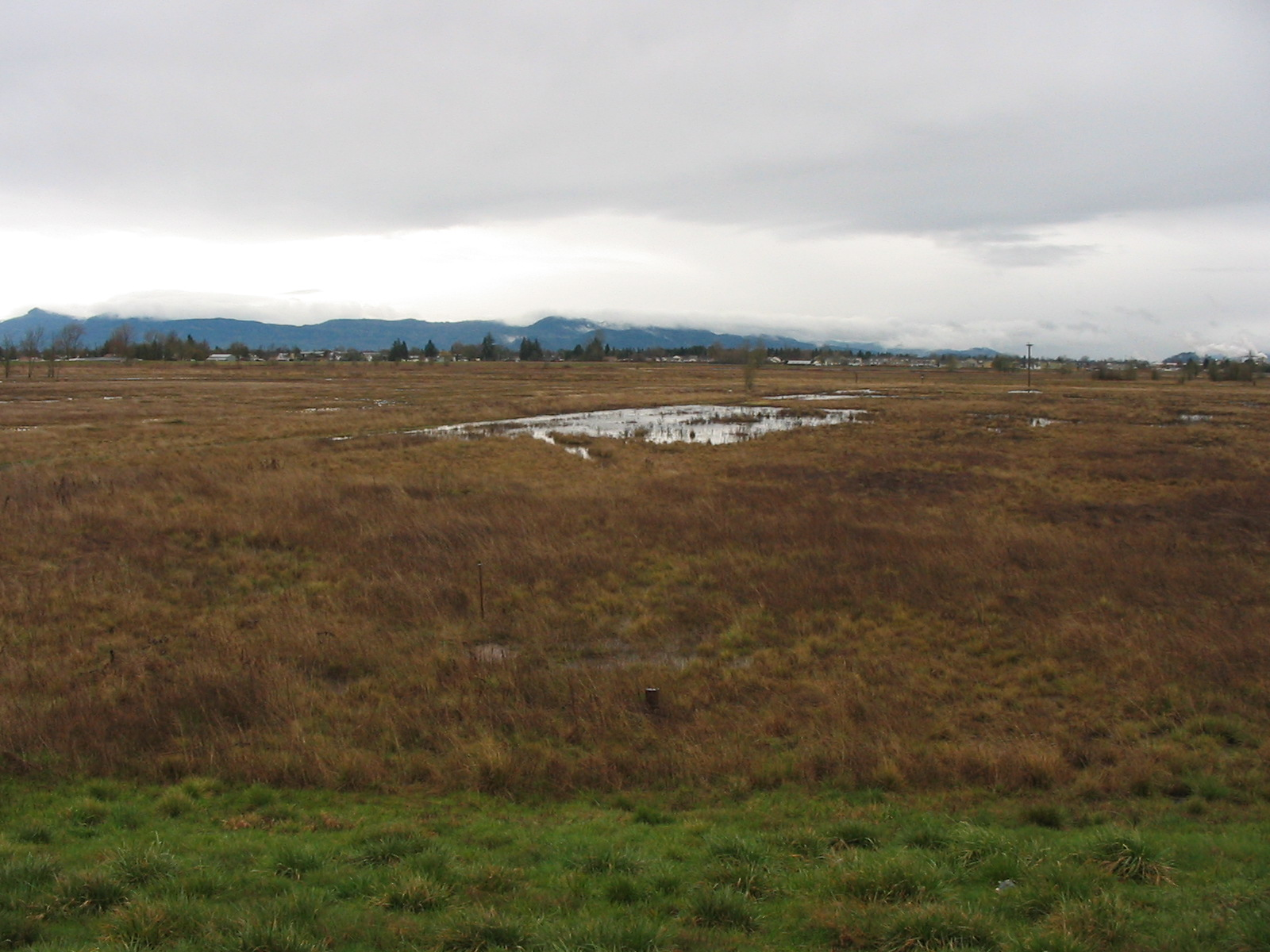
- Wetlands near Eugene, Oregon

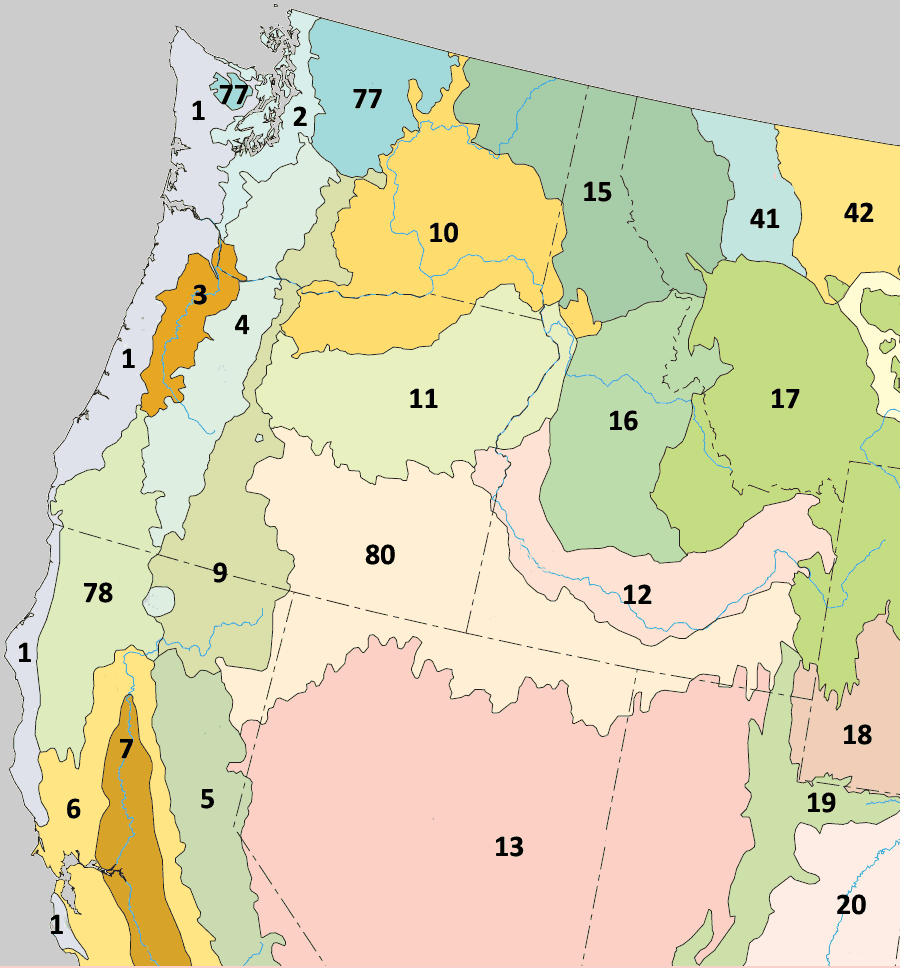
- Willamette Valley ecoregion (3)

Ecology
- Realm: Nearctic
- Biome: Temperate broadleaf and mixed forests
- Borders: Cascades; Coast Range; Klamath Mountains; Puget lowland forests
- Bird species: 177
- Mammal species: 77

Geography
- Area: 14,900 km^{2} (5,800 mi^{2})
- Country: United States
- States: Washington; Oregon
- Coordinates: 44.8°N 123.2°W

Conservation
- Habitat loss: 65.679%
- Protected: 4.07%

The Willamette Valley ecoregion is a Level III ecoregion designated by the United States Environmental Protection Agency in the U.S. states of Oregon and Washington.

Slightly larger than the Willamette Valley for which it is named, the ecoregion contains fluvial terraces and floodplains of the Willamette River system, scattered hills, buttes, and adjacent foothills. It is distinguished from the neighboring Coast Range, Cascades, and Klamath Mountains ecoregions by lower precipitation, lower elevation, less relief, and a different mosaic of vegetation. Mean annual rainfall is 37 to 60 inches (96 to 152 cm), and summers are generally dry.

Historically, the region was covered by rolling prairies, oak savanna, coniferous forests, extensive wetlands, and deciduous riparian forests. Today, it contains the bulk of Oregon's population, industry, commerce, and agriculture. Productive soils and a temperate climate make it one of the most important agricultural areas in Oregon.

== Setting ==
The ecoregion covers an area of 5,800 square miles (14,900 square kilometers), lying mostly in Oregon, with a small portion lying across the Columbia River in southern Washington. The ecoregion lies in the Willamette Valley, which runs from south to north between the Oregon Coast Range to the west and the Cascades Range to the east. The ecoregion is drained mostly by the Willamette River and its tributaries, which flows into the Columbia River straddled by Portland, Oregon.

== Landscape and threats ==
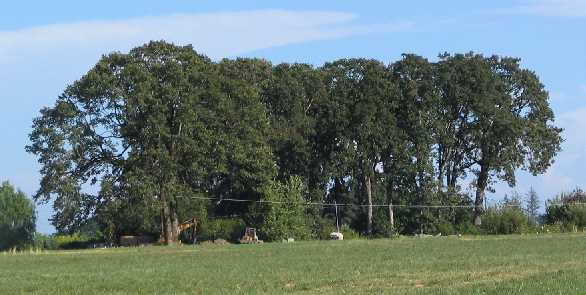
Grove of Oregon white oaks near Hillsboro

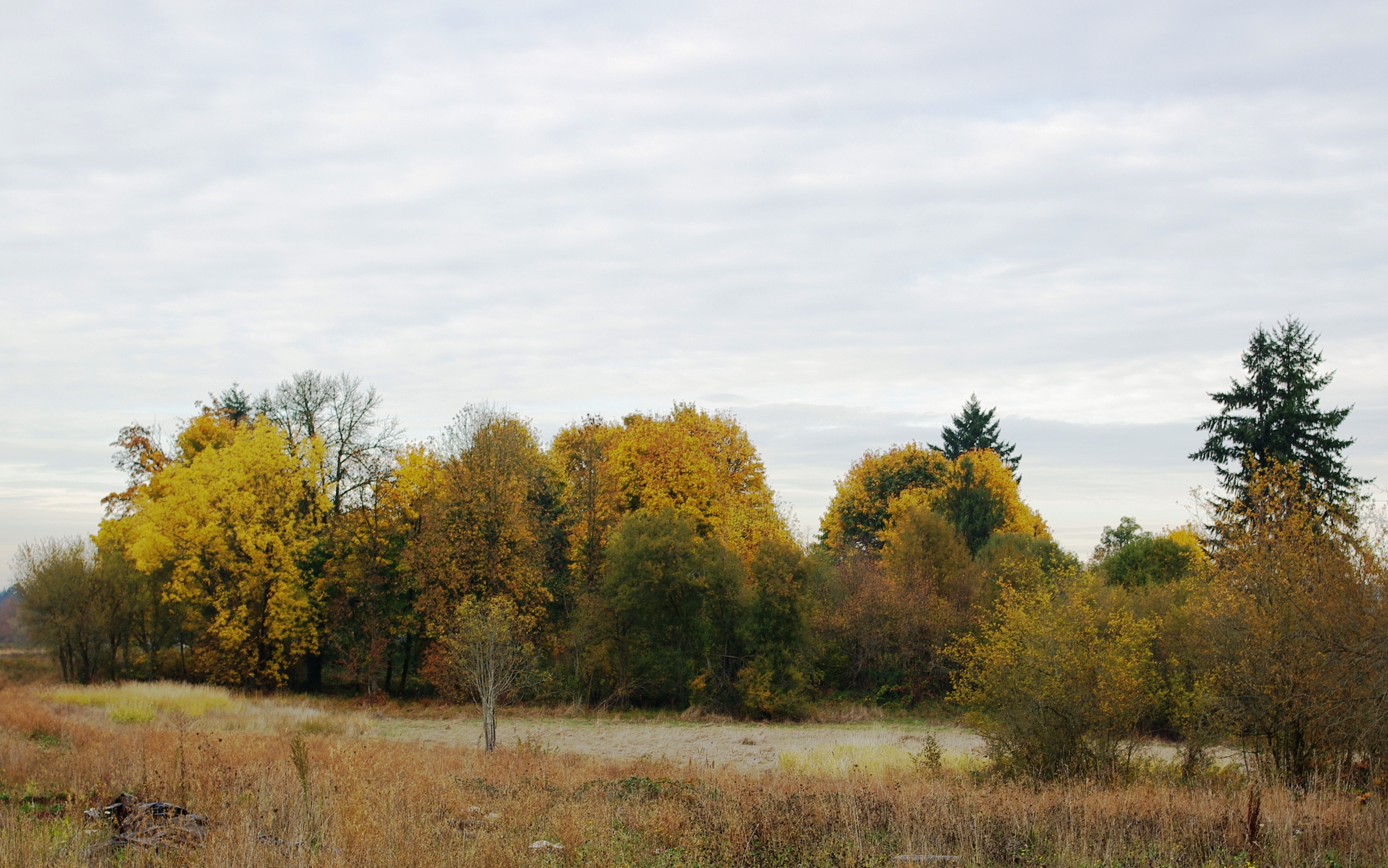
Fall colors in Wilsonville

Historically, the Willamette Valley forests were mostly an oak savanna, tall grasslands with scattered Oregon white oaks (Quercus garryana), and groves of coast Douglas-fir (Pseudotsuga menziesii subsp. menziesii). The river floodplains contained extensive wetlands, stands of willow, alder, and cottonwood, and gallery forests.

This landscape was maintained by the Native American inhabitants of the valley who set frequent fires which encouraged the open grasslands and killed young trees. The American settlers of the region, since the 19th century, suppressed fires and converted much of the valley to agriculture, which has caused much of the former grassland and savanna to revert to closed-canopy forest.

Less than one-tenth of one percent of the original savanna vegetation remains. The remaining enclaves include a section of Oregon white oak savanna preserved at Mount Pisgah Arboretum in Eugene.

== Level IV ecoregions ==
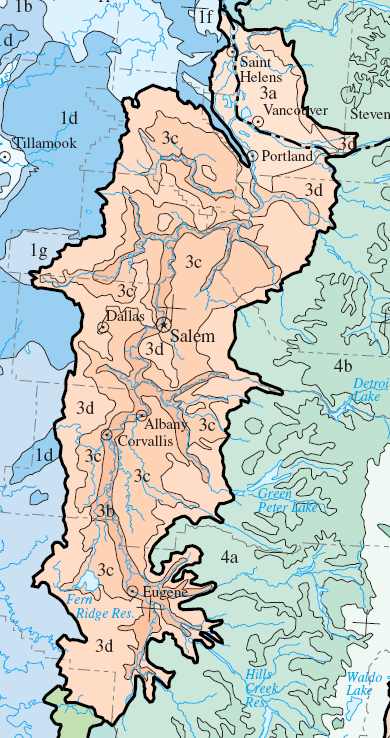
Level IV ecoregions in the Willamette Valley (Full map)

The Willamette Valley ecoregion is made up of four Level IV ecoregions:

=== Portland/Vancouver Basin (3a) ===
The Portland/Vancouver Basin ecoregion (named for the cities of Portland and Vancouver) is a geological depression at the base of the Portland Hills fault-block. It contains the confluence of the Willamette and Columbia Rivers and is composed of deltaic sands and gravels deposited by Pleistocene floods, notably the Missoula Floods. Elevation varies from 0 to 300 feet (0 to 90 m), with buttes as high as 650 ft (200 m).

Historically, the basin was characterized by Oregon white oak groves and Douglas-fir forests on the uplands; black cottonwood groves on riverbanks and islands; Oregon ash, red alder, and western redcedar in riparian areas; and prairie openings maintained by Native American burning, with camas, sedges, tufted hairgrass, fescue, and California oatgrass. Numerous wetlands, oxbow lakes, and ponds can still be found, but today the region is dominated by urban and suburban development, pastures, cropland, and tree farms.

The climate is usually marine-influenced, but easterly winds from the Columbia River Gorge periodically bring continental temperature extremes. The region covers 305 sq mi (790 km^{2}) in Washington and 269 sq mi (697 km^{2}) in Oregon, including the northern and eastern suburbs of the Portland metropolitan area. It contains several National Wildlife Refuges within the Ridgefield National Wildlife Refuge Complex.

=== Willamette River and Tributaries Gallery Forest (3b) ===
The Willamette River and Tributaries Gallery Forest ecoregion includes low-gradient, meandering river channels, oxbow lakes, and meander scars incised into the broad floodplains of the Willamette River and its tributaries. Elevation varies from 40 to 500 ft (12 to 150 m). The region includes the historic floodplains of the Willamette River system, which rarely function today due to flood control dams in the upper basin that have reduced the frequency and volume of floods and contributed to the decline of the endemic, endangered Oregon chub.

Historically, riparian gallery forests containing ash, black cottonwood, alder, and bigleaf maple grew on fertile, alluvial soils. Today, most of the forests have been replaced by agriculture and residential development. A small section, designated as the Willamette Floodplain, has been protected within the William L. Finley National Wildlife Refuge.

The region covers 675 sq mi (1,748 km^{2}) in Oregon in a narrow band rarely more than 5 miles (8 km) wide that extends along nearly the entire length of the Willamette River and the lower reaches of the McKenzie, Long Tom, Santiam, Yamhill, Molalla, Clackamas, and Tualatin rivers, including the Tualatin River National Wildlife Refuge.

=== Prairie Terraces (3c) ===
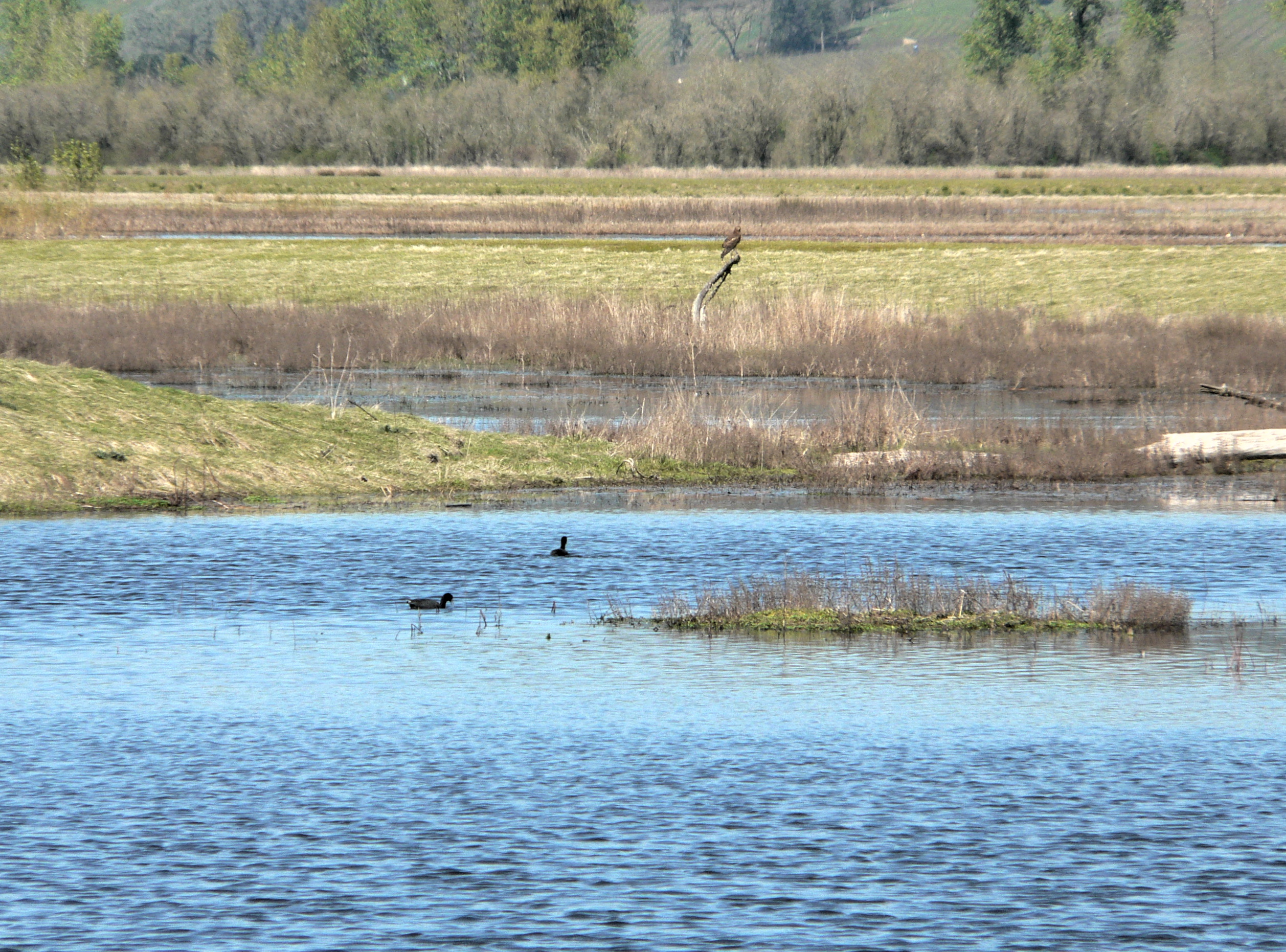
Ankeny National Wildlife Refuge in the Prairie Terraces ecoregion

The Prairie Terraces ecoregion includes all terraces of the Willamette River upstream of the Portland/Vancouver Basin. It is dissected by low-gradient, meandering streams and rivers. Elevation varies from 160 to 500 ft (50 to 150 m). The region's broad fluvial terraces once supported oak savanna and prairies, featuring Oregon white oak, camas, sedges, tufted hairgrass, fescue, and California oatgrass. Wetter areas supported Oregon ash, Douglas-fir, bigleaf maple, black cottonwood, and an understory of poison-oak, hazel, and Indian plum, with some Ponderosa pine to the south. Today, only relict native prairie remains.

The poorly drained soils derived from glacial lake deposits are extensively farmed for grass seed and small grains, as grasses tolerate poor drainage and poor rooting conditions better than other crops. Historically, seasonal wetlands and ponds were common, but many streams are now channelized and the wetlands have been reclaimed for grain crops. In addition to agriculture, the Prairie Terraces have experienced the brunt of urban and suburban development along the Interstate 5 corridor. The region covers 1,971 sq mi (5,105 km^{2}) in Oregon along the length of the valley and includes the Baskett Slough and Ankeny national wildlife refuges.

=== Valley Foothills (3d) ===
The Valley Foothills ecoregion is a transitional zone between the agricultural Willamette Valley and the more heavily forested Cascade and Coast ranges. It contains rolling foothills with medium gradient, sinuous streams, and a few buttes and low mountains, rising to an elevation of about 1,500 ft (457 m). The region receives less rainfall than its more mountainous neighbors, and consequently the potential natural vegetation is distinct. The eastern foothills are wetter than those that lie on the western side of the valley in the lee of the Coast Range.

Historically, the drier areas supported Oregon white oak and madrone woodlands and prairies, with California oatgrass, fescue, blue wildrye, brodiaea, and other prairie forbs; while the moister areas supported Douglas-fir forests, with sword fern, oceanspray, hazel, baldhip rose, poison oak, and wild blackberry. Today, the valley foothills are characterized by rural residential development, pastures, timberland, vineyards, Christmas tree farms, and orchards. The largest of the Willamette Valley subregions, it covers 2,415 square miles (6,255 km^{2}) in Oregon and 112 sq mi (290 km^{2}) in Washington.

== See also ==
- Ecoregions defined by the EPA and the Commission for Environmental Cooperation:
  - List of ecoregions in North America (CEC)
  - List of ecoregions in the United States (EPA)
  - List of ecoregions in Oregon
- The conservation group World Wildlife Fund maintains an alternate classification system:
  - List of ecoregions (WWF)
  - List of ecoregions in the United States (WWF)
