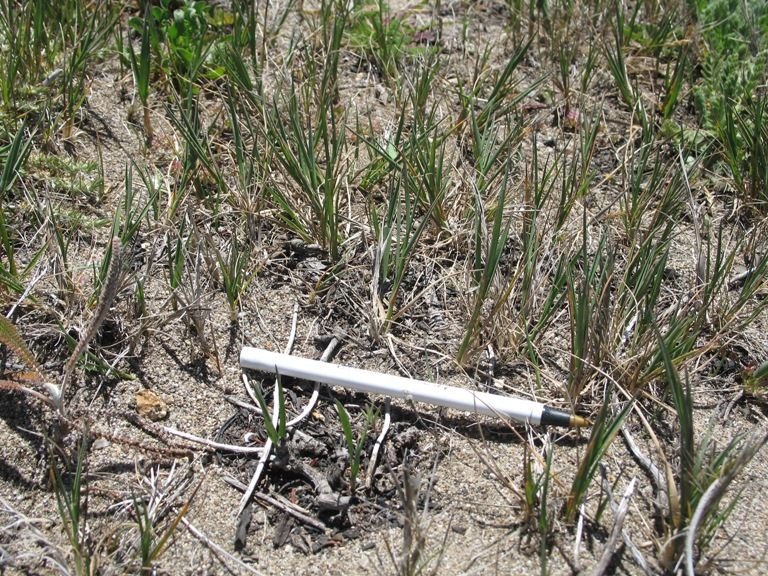

Conservation status
- Apparently Secure (NatureServe)

Scientific classification
- Kingdom: Plantae
- Clade: Tracheophytes
- Clade: Angiosperms
- Clade: Monocots
- Clade: Commelinids
- Order: Poales
- Family: Poaceae
- Subfamily: Pooideae
- Genus: Agrostis
- Species: A. pallens

Binomial name
- Agrostis pallens Trin.

Synonyms
- Agrostis diegoensis Vasey; Agrostis lepida Hitchc.

= Agrostis pallens =

Species of flowering plant

Agrostis pallens is a species of grass known by the common name seashore bentgrass.

== Distribution ==
It is native to western North America from British Columbia to Montana to California, where it grows in many types of habitat, typically open meadows, woodlands, subalpine areas, and other dry habitats. The diploid number of the grass is either 42 or 56.

== Description ==
Agrostis pallens is a perennial bunchgrass growing 10–70 cm (3.9–27.6 in) tall. It is occasionally rhizomatous. The ligule is 1.5–3 mm (0.059–0.118 in) long. The leaf blades are flat or inrolled, and 1.5–5 cm (0.59–1.97 in) long and 1–6 mm (0.039–0.236 in) wide. The lanceolate to somewhat ovate inflorescence is 5–20 cm (2.0–7.9 in) long. The glumes are 2–3 mm (0.079–0.118 in) long. The lemma is 1.5–2.5 mm (0.059–0.098 in) long, occasionally with a straight awn measuring between 0.5–2.5 cm (0.20–0.98 in). The palea is either absent or vestigial. The anthers are 0.7–1.8 mm (0.028–0.071 in) long.

The grass blooms from April into May.

The grass grows from 200–3,500 m (660–11,480 ft) of elevation.
