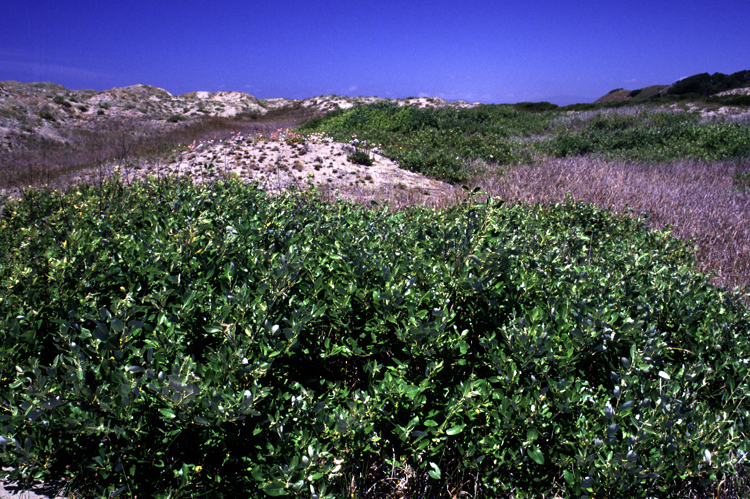

Conservation status
- Least Concern (IUCN 3.1)

Scientific classification
- Kingdom: Plantae
- Clade: Tracheophytes
- Clade: Angiosperms
- Clade: Eudicots
- Clade: Rosids
- Order: Malpighiales
- Family: Salicaceae
- Genus: Salix
- Species: S. hookeriana

Binomial name
- Salix hookeriana Barratt ex Hook.
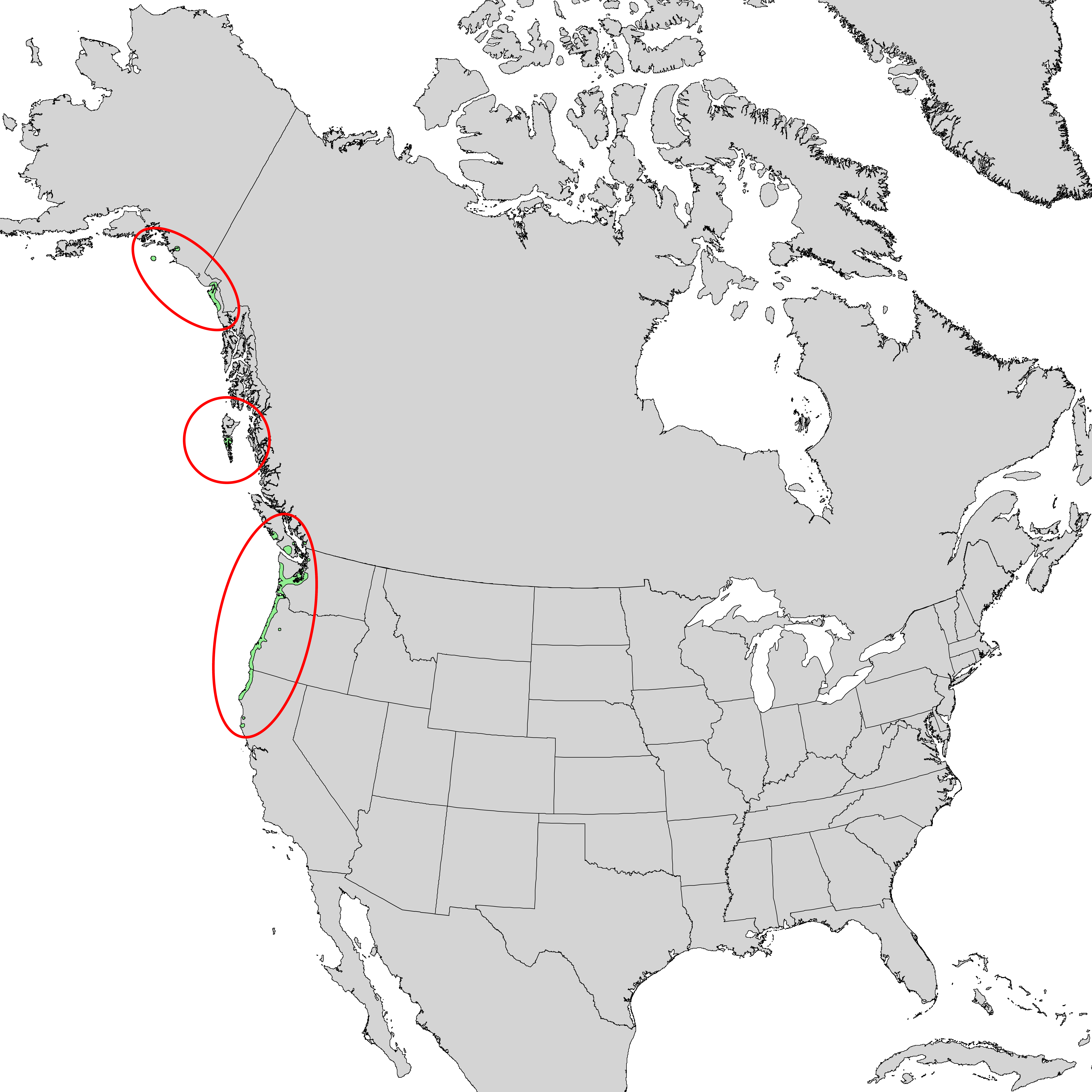
- Natural range of Salix hookeriana
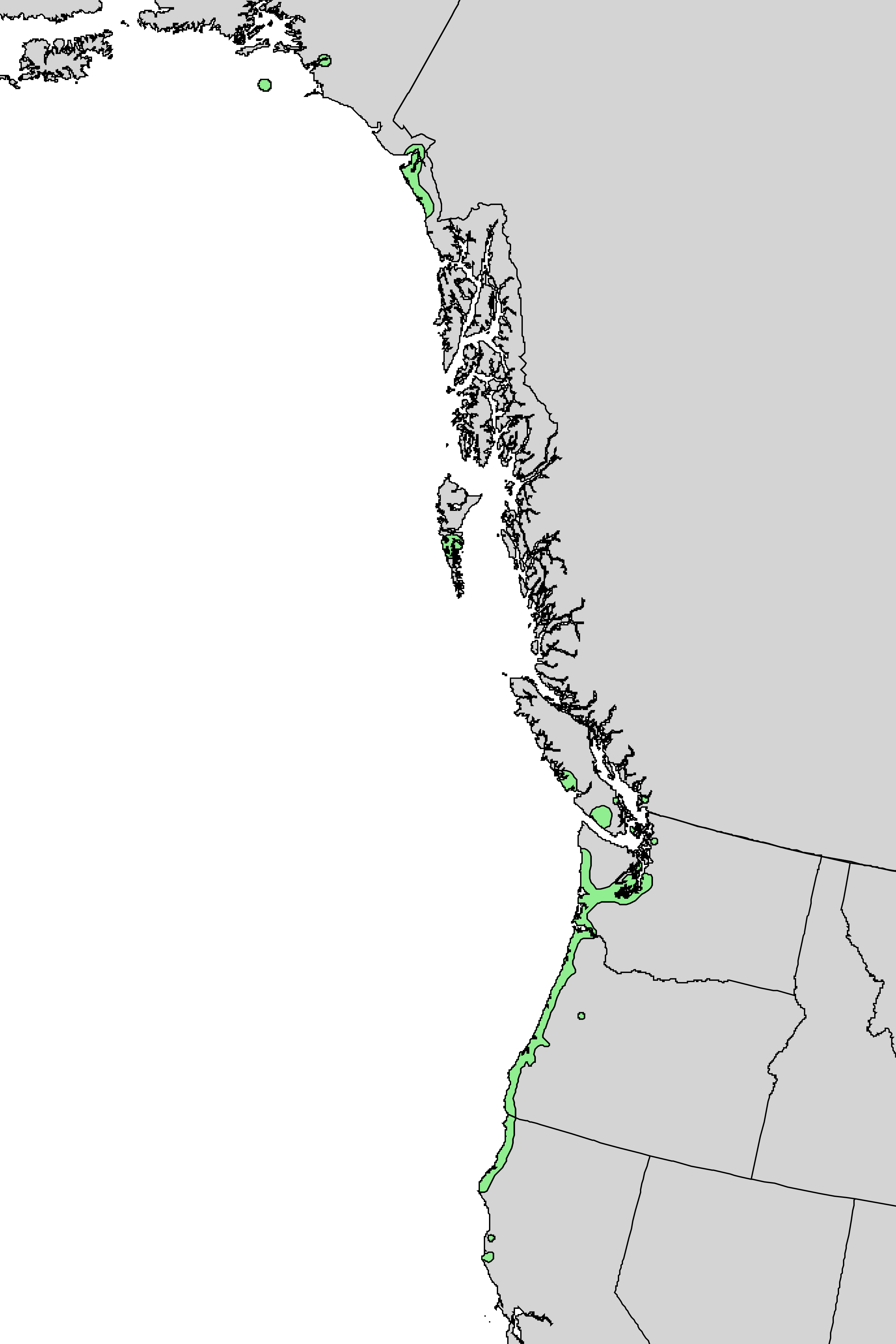
- Close-up of natural range of Salix hookeriana

Synonyms
- Salix amplifolia; Salix piperi

= Salix hookeriana =

Species of willow

Salix hookeriana is a species of willow known by the common names dune willow, coastal willow, and Hooker's willow.

== Description ==
Salix hookeriana is a shrub or tree growing up to 8 m (26 ft) tall, sometimes forming bushy colonial thickets. The leaves are up to 11 cm long, generally oval in shape, wavy along the edges, and hairy to woolly in texture with shiny upper surfaces.

The inflorescence is a catkin of flowers up to 9 cm long, with the female catkins growing longer as the fruits develop.

This willow may hybridize with similar species.

== Taxonomy ==
The Latin specific epithet hookeriana refers to William Jackson Hooker, author of Flora Boreali-Americana in which the species was first published.

== Distribution ==
The plant is native to the west coast of North America from Alaska to northern California, where it grows in coastal habitat such as beaches, marshes, floodplains, and canyons.

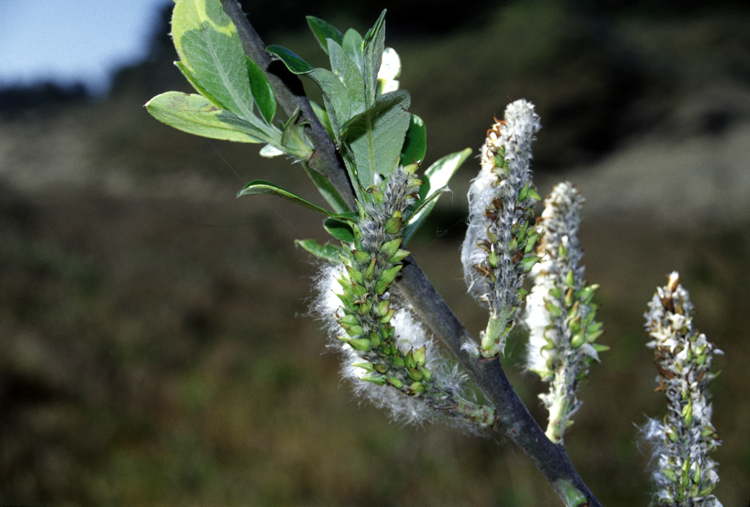
At the Humboldt Bay National Wildlife Refuge, California
