= British Columbia mainland coastal forests =

North American temperate coniferous forest

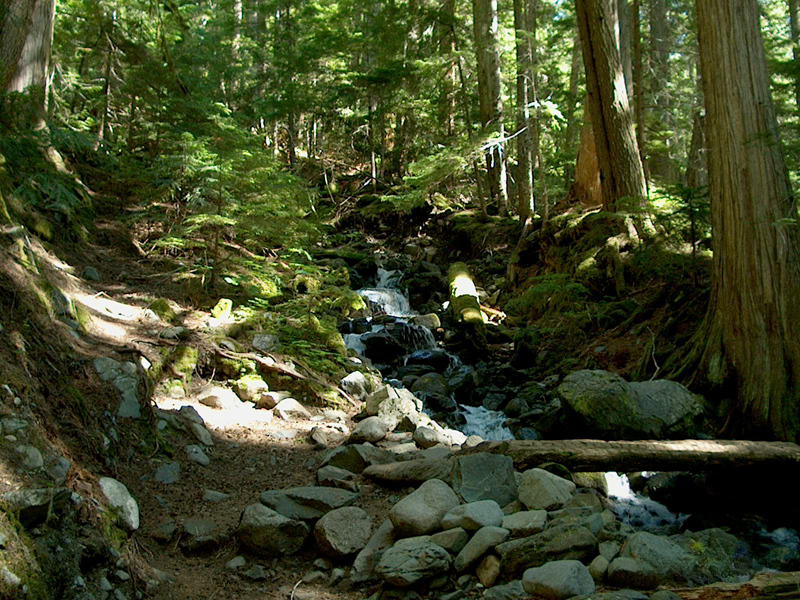
- Forest on Mount Garibaldi

Ecology
- Realm: Nearctic
- Biome: Temperate coniferous forests
- Borders: List: Cascade Mountains leeward forests; Central and Southern Cascades Forests; Central Pacific coastal forests; Fraser Plateau and Basin complex; Haida Gwaii forests; Northern Pacific coastal forests; Northern transitional alpine forests; Pacific Coastal Mountain icefields and tundra; Puget lowland forests
- Bird species: 221
- Mammal species: 78

Geography
- Area: 120,500 km^{2} (46,500 mi^{2})
- Countries: Canada; United States
- States: British Columbia; Washington
- Climate type: Oceanic (Cfb)

Conservation
- Conservation status: Critical/Endangered
- Habitat loss: 0.4161%
- Protected: 16.97%

British Columbia mainland coastal forests is a temperate coniferous forest ecoregion the Pacific coast of North America, as defined by the World Wildlife Fund (WWF) categorization system.

== Setting ==
The WWF defines the ecoregion as the mainland coast of British Columbia up to 150 km inland to the crest of the Coast Mountains, extending along the western front of the northern Cascade Range in northwestern Washington. Specific areas include the Pacific and Kitimat Ranges of the Coast Mountains, the Nass Ranges and the basin of the Nass River. An exclave of the ecoregion occupies the eastern slope of the Olympic Mountains on Washington's Olympic Peninsula. The landscape is a mixture of coastal lowland with many steep valleys, inlets, and fjords. The climate is drier on the inland mountains than right on the coast and the average annual temperature in the valleys is 6.5 °C.

Major urban centres located within this ecoregion include Whistler, Terrace, Kitimat, and Prince Rupert.

== Flora ==
There are three distinct types of vegetation on this coast: the forests of the coastal plain dominated by western hemlock (Tsuga heterophylla), western red cedar (Thuja plicata), douglas fir (Psuedotsuga menziesii; only present in the southern half of the coast), and amabilis fir (Abies amabilis). higher elevation forests consist of mountain hemlock (Tsuga mertensiana), amabilis fir, and yellow cedar (Chamaecyparis nootkatensis); and alpine tundra with sedge (Carex) meadows and lichen-covered rocks.

== Fauna ==
Mammals of the area include the Kermode bear a rare white subspecies of the American black bear (Ursus americanus) found on Princess Royal Island and elsewhere, grizzly bear (Ursus arctos horribilis), black-tailed deer (Odocoileus hemionus), moose (Alces alces), migratory woodland caribou (Rangifer tarandus caribou), grey wolf (Canis lupus), red fox (Vulpes vulpes), mountain goat (Oreamnos americanus), American mink (Neogale vision), American marten (Martes americana), North American river otter (Lontra canadensis), American beaver (Castor canadensis) and snowshoe hare (Lepus americanus). Birds include spotted owl (Strix occidentalis), dusky grouse (Dendragapus obscurus) and many waterbirds.

== Threats and preservation ==
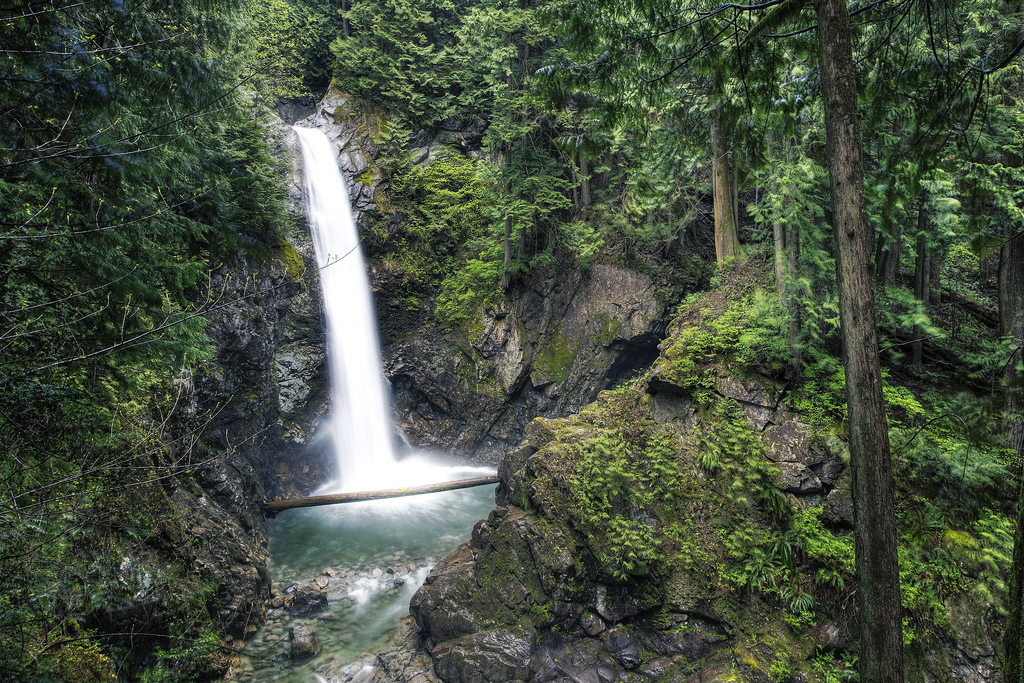
Intact forest in the Cascade Falls Regional Park, near Mission, British Columbia.

This is a well-preserved ecoregion with about 40% of original forest intact. Most disturbance has occurred in the valleys rather than the mountain tops and logging is ongoing. Blocks of intact habitat can be found in the Skagit Valley on the British Columbia/Washington border and the following parks in British Columbia: Kitlope Heritage Conservancy Protected Area, Garibaldi Provincial Park, Hakai Luxvbalis Conservancy Area, Fiordland Conservancy, Gitnadoiks River Provincial Park, Golden Ears Provincial Park, Khutzeymateen Grizzly Bear Sanctuary, Pinecone Burke Provincial Park, Homathko River-Tatlayoko Protected Area and Swan Lake Provincial Park.

== See also ==
- List of ecoregions in Canada (WWF)
- List of ecoregions in the United States (WWF)
- Alternative classification system
  - North Cascades (ecoregion) - Level II ecoregion in the CEC/EPA system
  - Cascades (ecoregion) - Level III ecoregion in the CEC/EPA system
  - Coast Range (ecoregion) - Level III ecoregion in the CEC/EPA system
  - Pacific Maritime Ecozone (CEC) - equivalent to EPA Level II ecoregion in Canada
  - List of ecoregions in the United States (EPA)#Marine West Coast Forest, EPA equivalent to Pacific Maritime Ecozone
