= Puget lowland forests =

Ecoregion on North America's Pacific coast

Puget Lowland Forests
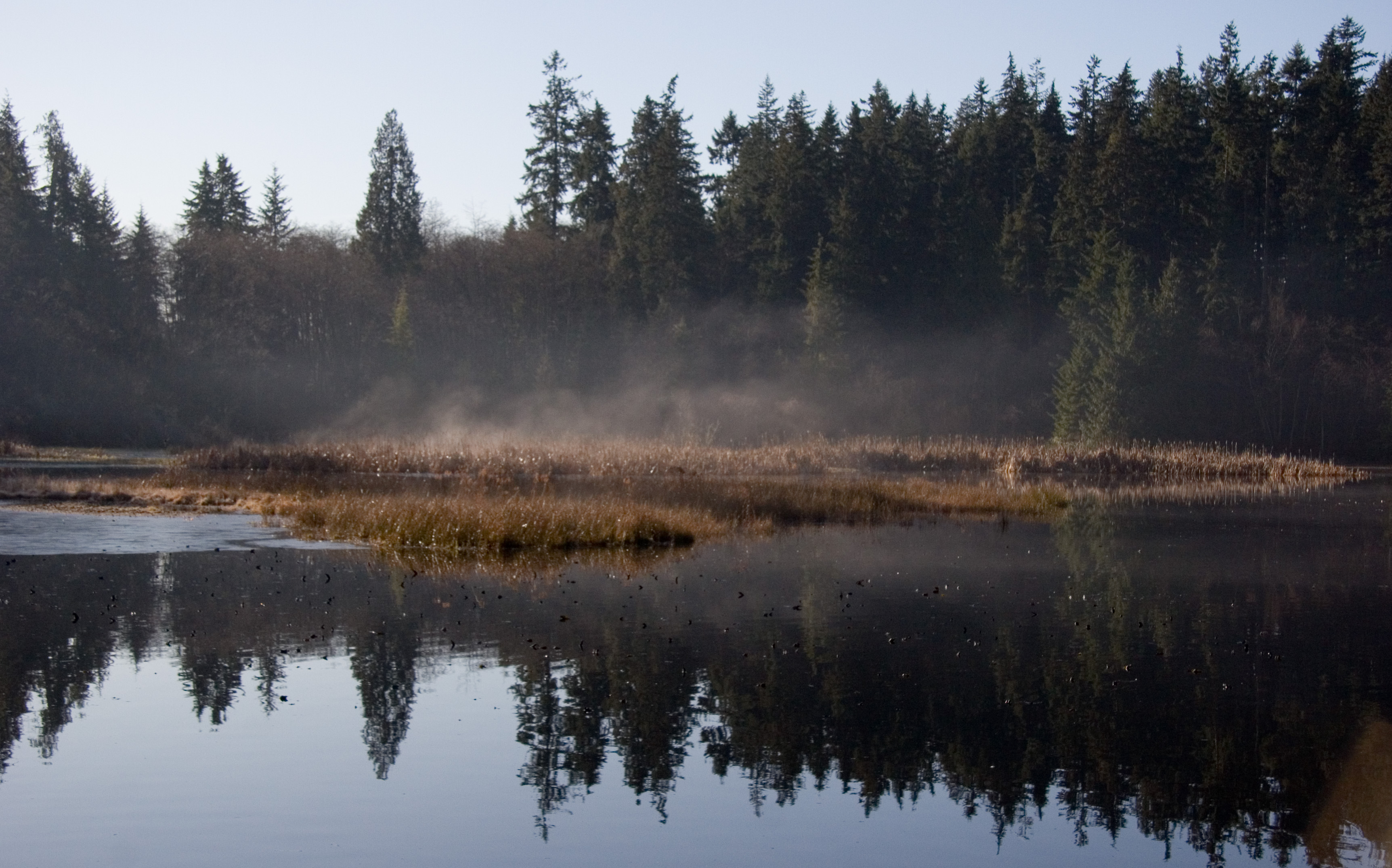
- Lowland forest of Stanley Park, Vancouver

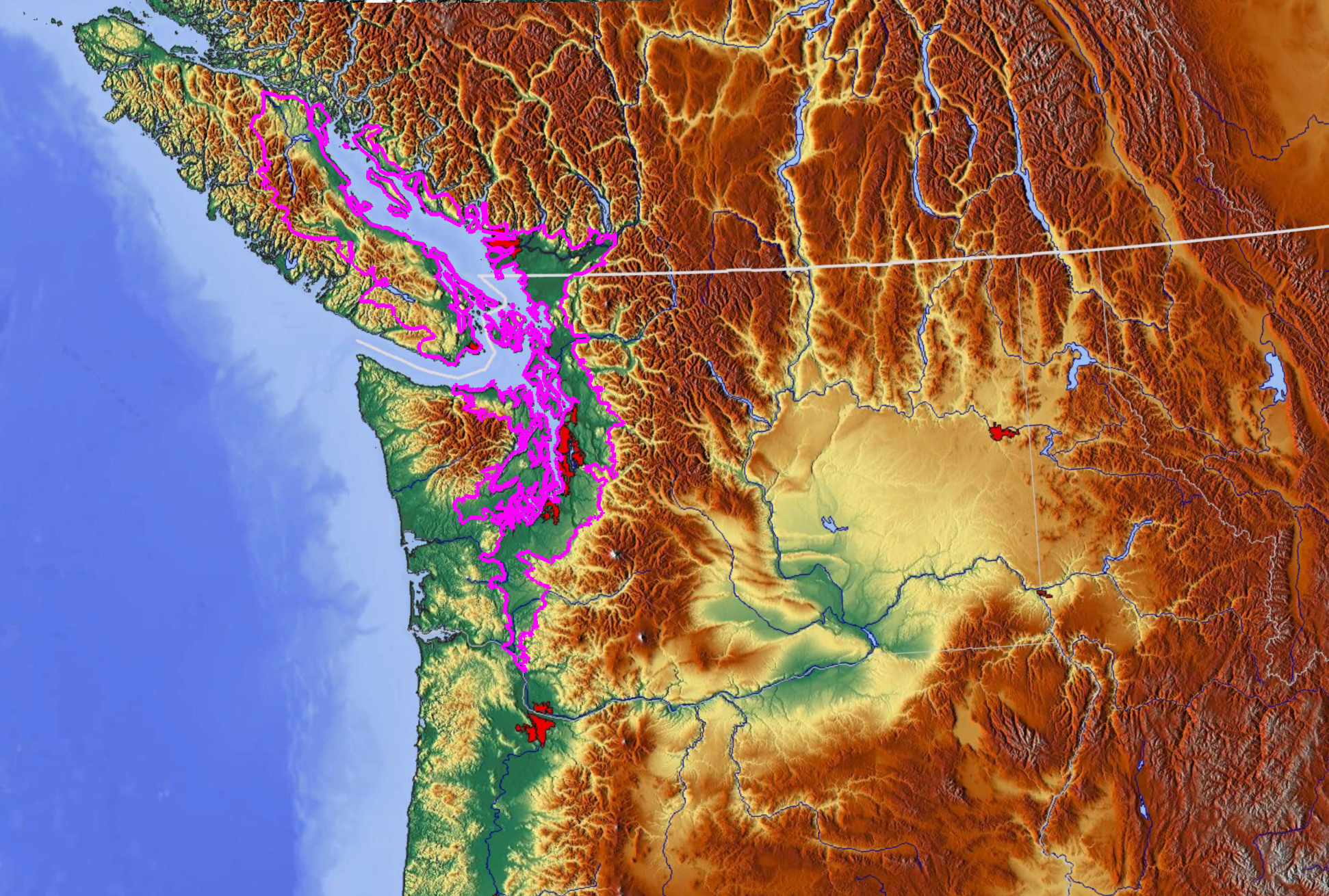
- Puget lowland forests ecoregion on a relief map encircled in magenta

Ecology
- Realm: Nearctic
- Biome: Temperate coniferous forests
- Borders: British Columbia mainland coastal forests; Central and Southern Cascades forests; Central Pacific coastal forests; Willamette Valley
- Bird species: 195
- Mammal species: 68

Geography
- Area: 22,533 km^{2} (8,700 sq mi)
- Countries: Canada; United States
- States: British Columbia; Washington

Conservation
- Conservation status: Critical/Endangered
- Habitat loss: 41%
- Protected: 5.91%

Puget lowland forests is a temperate coniferous forest ecoregion on the Pacific coast of North America, as defined by the World Wildlife Fund (WWF) categorization system.

== Setting ==
The WWF defines the ecoregion as inhabiting mainland coasts and islands of the Georgia Depression, a glacially depressed area dominated by the Salish Sea and numerous inflowing rivers. This differs from the Strait of Georgia/Puget Lowland ecoregion defined by the CEC in that it explicitly excludes the lowlands along the east coast of Vancouver Island. The WWF considers these lowlands a part of the neighbouring Central Pacific coastal forests ecoregion.

The landscape features glacially striated tablelands and rolling hills underlain by sedimentary rocks. The majority of soils in the depression are formed from glacial till, glacial outwash, and Lacustrine deposits. Elevations range from sea level to 460 m (1,509 ft), seldom exceeding 160 m (525 ft).

== Climate ==
The ecoregion has a predominantly Mediterranean climate (Köppen Csb) with fresh, dry, sunny summers and cool winters with moderate precipitation and plentiful cloud cover. Further inland it gradually transitions into an Oceanic climate (Köppen Cfb) with slightly milder, wetter summers. The mean annual temperature is 9 °C (48.2 °F), the mean summer temperature is 15 °C (59 °F), and the mean winter temperature is 3.5 °C (38.3 °F). Annual precipitation averages between 800 and 900 mm (31.5 to 35.4 in), but may be as high as 1,530 mm (60.2 in).

== Ecology ==
=== Flora ===
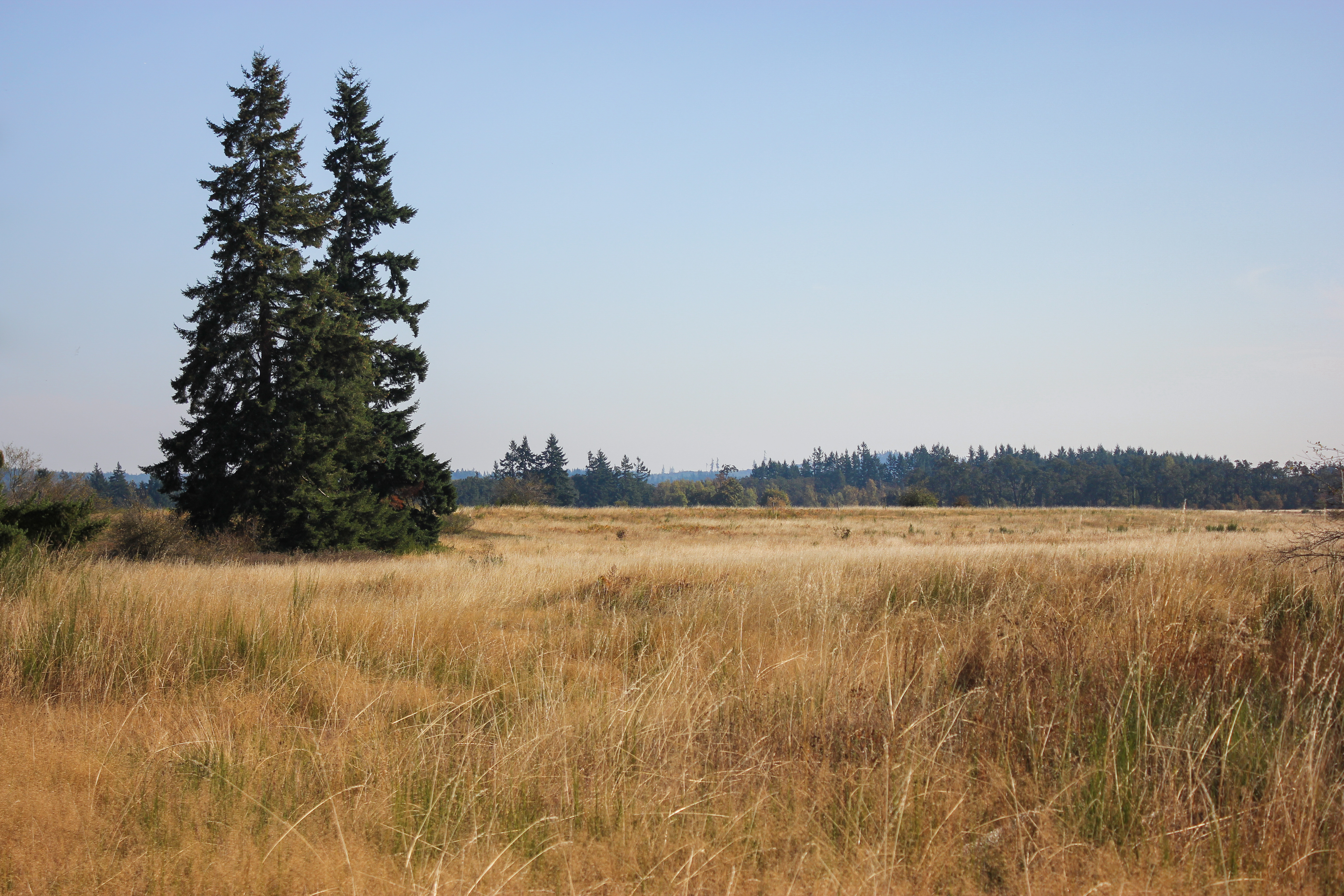
Prairies of South Puget Sound

Before European settlement, the Georgia Depression was dominated by dense coniferous forests of Coast Douglas-fir, Western Hemlock, Western Redcedar, shore pine, and western white pine. The ecoregion was also home to extensive coastal wetlands and peat bog ecosystems scattered about in poorly drained areas. The lowlands south of Puget Sound were home to an extensive region of prairies. These ecosystems have since been greatly reduced in size due to the repurposing of these lands for agriculture, grazing, industry, and urban development.

=== Fauna ===
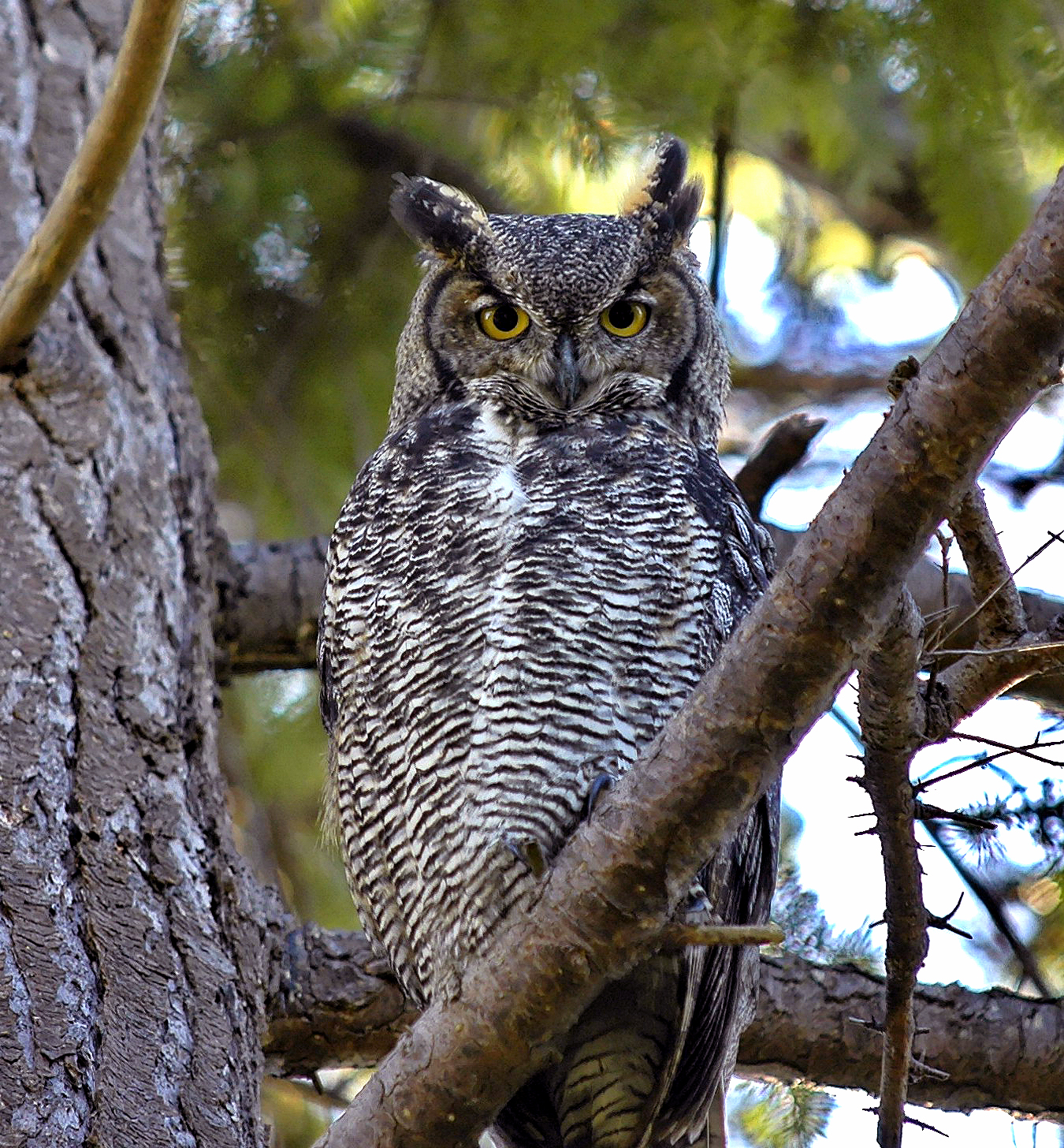
Great horned owl at the George C. Reifel Migratory Bird Sanctuary in Delta, British Columbia

Mammals that inhabit this ecoregion include black-tailed deer, coyote, raccoon, mink, sea otter, harbour seal, red fox, and the introduced Virginia opossum. Birds represent the majority of resident species, including cooper’s hawk, bald eagle, turkey vulture, owl, blue grouse, waterfowl, and numerous passerine species.

== Threats and preservation ==
=== Development ===
This ecoregion lies within the most densely populated area of British Columbia and Washington, including the metropolitan areas of Vancouver and Seattle. Consequently, only 5% of the original lowland forest habitat within the region remains, and over 90% of these remaining areas have been heavily altered from their natural state. Most exist as tree farms, city parks, or as small state/provincial parks geographically isolated from one another.

=== Climate change ===
Sea-level rise threatens to permanently flood large swaths of coastal wetland and lowland forest. Regions at highest risk include the Fraser Lowland and Skagit Valley.

=== Preservation ===
The opportunity exists to use local conservation easements to protect remaining riparian and wetland areas, restore a portion of the old-growth forests, and provide connections to adjacent ecoregions. The best candidates for conservation include the establishment of more forest connections between the forests of the Olympic Peninsula and Cascade Mountains just south of Olympia and the protection of Burns Bog within Metro Vancouver.

=== Protected areas ===
Some protected areas of this ecoregion include:

- Anacortes Community Forest Lands
- Billy Frank Jr. Nisqually National Wildlife Refuge
- Burns Bog – part of the Fraser River Delta Ramsar Site
- Desolation Sound Marine Provincial Park
- Gulf Islands National Park Reserve
- Moran State Park
- Larrabee State Park
- Stanley Park

== See also ==
- List of ecoregions in Canada (WWF)
- List of ecoregions in the United States (WWF)
