= List of ecoregions in North America =

This list of ecoregions of North America provides an overview of North American ecoregions designated by the Commission for Environmental Cooperation (CEC) in its North American Environmental Atlas. It should not be confused with Wikipedia articles based on the classification system developed by the World Wildlife Fund, such as List of ecoregions (WWF) and Lists of ecoregions by country.

The commission was established in 1994 by the member states of Canada, Mexico, and the United States to address regional environmental concerns under the North American Agreement on Environmental Cooperation (NAAEC), the environmental side accord to the North American Free Trade Agreement (NAFTA). The commission's 1997 report, Ecological Regions of North America, provides a framework that may be used by government agencies, non-governmental organizations, and academic researchers as a basis for risk analysis, resource management, and environmental study of the continent's ecosystems. Ecoregions may be identified by similarities in geology, physiography, vegetation, climate soils, land use, wildlife distributions, and hydrology.

The classification system has four levels. Only the first three levels are shown on this list. "Level I" divides North America into 15 broad ecoregions. "Level II" subdivides the continent into 52 smaller ecoregions. "Level III" subdivides those regions again into 182 ecoregions. "Level IV" is a further subdivision of Level III ecoregions. Level IV mapping is still underway but is complete across most of the United States. For an example of Level IV data, see List of ecoregions in Oregon and the associated articles.

== List ==
Level I		Level II		Level III	
Code	Name	Code	Name	Code	Name
1	Arctic Cordillera	1.1	Arctic Cordillera	1.1.1	Ellesmere and Devon Islands Ice Caps
1	Arctic Cordillera	1.1	Arctic Cordillera	1.1.2	Baffin and Torngat Mountains
2	Tundra	2.1	Northern Arctic	2.1.1	Sverdrup Islands Lowland
2	Tundra	2.1	Northern Arctic	2.1.2	Ellesmere Mountains and Eureka Hills
2	Tundra	2.1	Northern Arctic	2.1.3	Parry Islands Plateau
2	Tundra	2.1	Northern Arctic	2.1.4	Lancaster and Borden Peninsula Plateaus
2	Tundra	2.1	Northern Arctic	2.1.5	Foxe Uplands
2	Tundra	2.1	Northern Arctic	2.1.6	Baffin Uplands
2	Tundra	2.1	Northern Arctic	2.1.7	Gulf of Boothia and Foxe Basin Plains
2	Tundra	2.1	Northern Arctic	2.1.8	Victoria Island Lowlands
2	Tundra	2.1	Northern Arctic	2.1.9	Banks Island and Amundsen Gulf Lowlands
2	Tundra	2.2	Alaska Tundra	2.2.1	Arctic Coastal Plain
2	Tundra	2.2	Alaska Tundra	2.2.2	Arctic Foothills
2	Tundra	2.2	Alaska Tundra	2.2.3	Subarctic Coastal Plains
2	Tundra	2.2	Alaska Tundra	2.2.4	Seward Peninsula
2	Tundra	2.2	Alaska Tundra	2.2.5	Bristol Bay-Nushagak Lowlands
2	Tundra	2.2	Alaska Tundra	2.2.6	Aleutian Islands
2	Tundra	2.3	Brooks Range Tundra	2.3.1	Brooks Range/Richardson Mountains
2	Tundra	2.4	Southern Arctic	2.4.1	Amundsen Plains
2	Tundra	2.4	Southern Arctic	2.4.2	Aberdeen Plains
2	Tundra	2.4	Southern Arctic	2.4.3	Central Angava Peninsula and Ottawa and Belcher Islands
2	Tundra	2.4	Southern Arctic	2.4.4	Queen Maud Gulf and Chantrey Inlet Lowlands
3	Taiga	3.1	Alaska Boreal Interior	3.1.1	Interior Forested Lowlands and Uplands
3	Taiga	3.1	Alaska Boreal Interior	3.1.2	Interior Bottomlands
3	Taiga	3.1	Alaska Boreal Interior	3.1.3	Yukon Flats
3	Taiga	3.2	Taiga Cordillera	3.2.1	Oglivie Mountains
3	Taiga	3.2	Taiga Cordillera	3.2.2	Mackenzie and Selwyn Mountains
3	Taiga	3.2	Taiga Cordillera	3.2.3	Peel River and Nahanni Plateaus
3	Taiga	3.3	Taiga Plains	3.3.1	Great Bear Plains
3	Taiga	3.3	Taiga Plains	3.3.2	Hay and Slave River Lowlands
3	Taiga	3.4	Taiga Shield	3.4.1	Kazan River and Selwyn Lake Uplands
3	Taiga	3.4	Taiga Shield	3.4.2	La Grande Hills and New Quebec Central Plateau
3	Taiga	3.4	Taiga Shield	3.4.3	Smallwood Uplands
3	Taiga	3.4	Taiga Shield	3.4.4	Ungava Bay Basin and George Plateau
3	Taiga	3.4	Taiga Shield	3.4.5	Coppermine River and Tazin Lake Uplands
4	Hudson Plain	4.1	Hudson Plain	4.1.1	Coastal Hudson Bay Lowland
4	Hudson Plain	4.1	Hudson Plain	4.1.2	Hudson Bay and Hames Lowlands
5	Northern Forests	5.1	Softwood Shield	5.1.1	Athabasca Plain and Churchill River Upland
5	Northern Forests	5.1	Softwood Shield	5.1.2	Lake Nipigon and Lac Seul Upland
5	Northern Forests	5.1	Softwood Shield	5.1.3	Central Laurentians and Mecatina Plateau
5	Northern Forests	5.1	Softwood Shield	5.1.4	Newfoundland Island
5	Northern Forests	5.1	Softwood Shield	5.1.5	Hayes River Upland and Big Trout Lake
5	Northern Forests	5.1	Softwood Shield	5.1.6	Abitibi Plains and Riviere Rupert Plateau
5	Northern Forests	5.2	Mixed Wood Shield	5.2.1	Northern Lakes and Forests
5	Northern Forests	5.2	Mixed Wood Shield	5.2.2	Northern Minnesota Wetlands
5	Northern Forests	5.2	Mixed Wood Shield	5.2.3	Algonquin/Southern Laurentians
5	Northern Forests	5.3	Atlantic Highlands	5.3.1	Northern Appalachians and Atlantic Maritime Highlands
5	Northern Forests	5.3	Atlantic Highlands	5.3.2	North Central Appalachians
5	Northern Forests	5.4	Boreal Plain	5.4.1	Mid-Boreal Uplands and Peac-Wabaska Lowlands
5	Northern Forests	5.4	Boreal Plain	5.4.2	Clear Hills and Western Alberta Uplands
5	Northern Forests	5.4	Boreal Plain	5.4.3	Mid-Boreal Lowland and Interlake Plains
6	Northwestern Forested Mountains	6.1	Boreal Cordillera	6.1.1	Interior Highlands and Klondike Plateau
6	Northwestern Forested Mountains	6.1	Boreal Cordillera	6.1.2	Alaska Range
6	Northwestern Forested Mountains	6.1	Boreal Cordillera	6.1.3	Copper Plateau
6	Northwestern Forested Mountains	6.1	Boreal Cordillera	6.1.4	Wrangell and St. Elias Mountains
6	Northwestern Forested Mountains	6.1	Boreal Cordillera	6.1.5	Watson Highlands
6	Northwestern Forested Mountains	6.1	Boreal Cordillera	6.1.6	Yukon-Stikine Highlands/Boreal Mountains and Plateaus
6	Northwestern Forested Mountains	6.1	Western Cordillera	6.2.1	Skeena-Omineca-Central Canadian Rocky Mountains
6	Northwestern Forested Mountains	6.1	Western Cordillera	6.2.2	Chilcotin Ranges and Fraser Plateau
6	Northwestern Forested Mountains	6.1	Western Cordillera	6.2.3	Columbia Mountains/Northern Rockies
6	Northwestern Forested Mountains	6.1	Western Cordillera	6.2.4	Canadian Rockies
6	Northwestern Forested Mountains	6.1	Western Cordillera	6.2.5	North Cascades
6	Northwestern Forested Mountains	6.1	Western Cordillera	6.2.6	Cypress Upland
6	Northwestern Forested Mountains	6.1	Western Cordillera	6.2.7	Cascades
6	Northwestern Forested Mountains	6.1	Western Cordillera	6.2.8	Eastern Cascades Slopes and Foothills
6	Northwestern Forested Mountains	6.1	Western Cordillera	6.2.9	Blue Mountains
6	Northwestern Forested Mountains	6.1	Western Cordillera	6.2.10	Middle Rockies
6	Northwestern Forested Mountains	6.1	Western Cordillera	6.2.11	Klamath Mountains
6	Northwestern Forested Mountains	6.1	Western Cordillera	6.2.12	Sierra Nevada
6	Northwestern Forested Mountains	6.1	Western Cordillera	6.2.13	Wasatch and Uinta Mountains
6	Northwestern Forested Mountains	6.1	Western Cordillera	6.2.14	Southern Rockies
6	Northwestern Forested Mountains	6.1	Western Cordillera	6.2.15	Idaho Batholith
7	Marine West Coast Forest	7.1	Marine West Coast Forest	7.1.1	Ahklun and Kilbuck Mountains
7	Marine West Coast Forest	7.1	Marine West Coast Forest	7.1.2	Alaska Peninsula Mountains
7	Marine West Coast Forest	7.1	Marine West Coast Forest	7.1.3	Cook Inlet
7	Marine West Coast Forest	7.1	Marine West Coast Forest	7.1.4	Pacific Coastal Mountains
7	Marine West Coast Forest	7.1	Marine West Coast Forest	7.1.5	Coastal Western Hemlock-Sitka Spruce Forests
7	Marine West Coast Forest	7.1	Marine West Coast Forest	7.1.6	Pacific and Nass Ranges
7	Marine West Coast Forest	7.1	Marine West Coast Forest	7.1.7	Strait of Georgia/Puget Lowland
7	Marine West Coast Forest	7.1	Marine West Coast Forest	7.1.8	Coast Range
7	Marine West Coast Forest	7.1	Marine West Coast Forest	7.1.9	Willamette Valley
8	Eastern Temperate Forests	8.1	Mixed Wood Plains	8.1.1	Eastern Great Lakes and Hudson Lowlands
8	Eastern Temperate Forests	8.1	Mixed Wood Plains	8.1.2	Lake Erie Lowland
8	Eastern Temperate Forests	8.1	Mixed Wood Plains	8.1.3	Northern Appalachian Plateau and Uplands
8	Eastern Temperate Forests	8.1	Mixed Wood Plains	8.1.4	North Central Hardwood Forests
8	Eastern Temperate Forests	8.1	Mixed Wood Plains	8.1.5	Driftless Area
8	Eastern Temperate Forests	8.1	Mixed Wood Plains	8.1.6	S. Michigan/N. Indiana Drift Plains
8	Eastern Temperate Forests	8.1	Mixed Wood Plains	8.1.7	Northeastern Coastal Zone
8	Eastern Temperate Forests	8.1	Mixed Wood Plains	8.1.8	Maine/New Brunswick Plains and Hills
8	Eastern Temperate Forests	8.1	Mixed Wood Plains	8.1.9	Maritime Lowlands
8	Eastern Temperate Forests	8.1	Mixed Wood Plains	8.1.10	Erie Drift Plain
8	Eastern Temperate Forests	8.2	Central USA Plains	8.2.1	Southeastern Wisconsin Till Plains
8	Eastern Temperate Forests	8.2	Central USA Plains	8.2.2	Huron/Erie Lake Plains
8	Eastern Temperate Forests	8.2	Central USA Plains	8.2.3	Central Corn Belt Plains
8	Eastern Temperate Forests	8.2	Central USA Plains	8.2.4	Eastern Corn Belt Plains
8	Eastern Temperate Forests	8.3	Southeastern USA Plains	8.3.1	Northern Piedmont
8	Eastern Temperate Forests	8.3	Southeastern USA Plains	8.3.2	Interior River Valleys and Hills
8	Eastern Temperate Forests	8.3	Southeastern USA Plains	8.3.3	Interior Plateau
8	Eastern Temperate Forests	8.3	Southeastern USA Plains	8.3.4	Piedmont
8	Eastern Temperate Forests	8.3	Southeastern USA Plains	8.3.5	Southeastern Plains
8	Eastern Temperate Forests	8.3	Southeastern USA Plains	8.3.6	Mississippi Valley Loess Plains
8	Eastern Temperate Forests	8.3	Southeastern USA Plains	8.3.7	South Central Plains
8	Eastern Temperate Forests	8.3	Southeastern USA Plains	8.3.8	East Central Texas Plains
8	Eastern Temperate Forests	8.4	Ozark, Ouachita-Appalachian Forests	8.4.1	Ridge and Valley
8	Eastern Temperate Forests	8.4	Ozark, Ouachita-Appalachian Forests	8.4.2	Central Appalachians
8	Eastern Temperate Forests	8.4	Ozark, Ouachita-Appalachian Forests	8.4.3	Western Allegheny Plateau
8	Eastern Temperate Forests	8.4	Ozark, Ouachita-Appalachian Forests	8.4.4	Blue Ridge
8	Eastern Temperate Forests	8.4	Ozark, Ouachita-Appalachian Forests	8.4.5	Ozark Highlands
8	Eastern Temperate Forests	8.4	Ozark, Ouachita-Appalachian Forests	8.4.6	Boston Mountains
8	Eastern Temperate Forests	8.4	Ozark, Ouachita-Appalachian Forests	8.4.7	Arkansas Valley
8	Eastern Temperate Forests	8.4	Ozark, Ouachita-Appalachian Forests	8.4.8	Ouachita Mountains
8	Eastern Temperate Forests	8.4	Ozark, Ouachita-Appalachian Forests	8.4.9	Southwestern Appalachians
8	Eastern Temperate Forests	8.5	Mississippi Alluvial and Southeast USA Coastal Plains	8.5.1	Middle Atlantic Coastal Plain
8	Eastern Temperate Forests	8.5	Mississippi Alluvial and Southeast USA Coastal Plains	8.5.2	Mississippi Alluvial Plain
8	Eastern Temperate Forests	8.5	Mississippi Alluvial and Southeast USA Coastal Plains	8.5.3	Southern Coastal Plain
8	Eastern Temperate Forests	8.5	Mississippi Alluvial and Southeast USA Coastal Plains	8.5.4	Atlantic Coastal Pine Barrens
9	Great Plains	9.2	Temperate Prairies	9.2.1	Aspen Parkland/Northern Glaciated Plains
9	Great Plains	9.2	Temperate Prairies	9.2.2	Lake Manitoba and Lake Agassiz Plain
9	Great Plains	9.2	Temperate Prairies	9.2.3	Western Corn Belt Plains
9	Great Plains	9.2	Temperate Prairies	9.2.4	Central Irregular Plains
9	Great Plains	9.3	West-Central Semi-Arid Prairies	9.3.1	Northwestern Glaciated Plains
9	Great Plains	9.3	West-Central Semi-Arid Prairies	9.3.3	Northwestern Great Plains
9	Great Plains	9.3	West-Central Semi-Arid Prairies	9.3.4	Nebraska Sand Hills
9	Great Plains	9.4	South Central Semi-Arid Prairies	9.4.1	High Plains
9	Great Plains	9.4	South Central Semi-Arid Prairies	9.4.2	Central Great Plains
9	Great Plains	9.4	South Central Semi-Arid Prairies	9.4.3	Southwestern Tablelands
9	Great Plains	9.4	South Central Semi-Arid Prairies	9.4.4	Flint Hills
9	Great Plains	9.4	South Central Semi-Arid Prairies	9.4.5	Cross Timbers
9	Great Plains	9.4	South Central Semi-Arid Prairies	9.4.6	Edwards Plateau
9	Great Plains	9.4	South Central Semi-Arid Prairies	9.4.7	Texas Blackland Prairies
9	Great Plains	9.5	Texas-Louisiana Coastal Plain	9.5.1	Western Gulf Coastal Plain
9	Great Plains	9.6	Tamaulipas-Texas Semi-Arid Plain	9.6.1	Southern Texas Plains/Interior Plains and Hills with Xerophytic Shrub and Oak Forest
10	North American Deserts	10.1	Cold Deserts	10.1.1	Thompson-Okanogan Plateau
10	North American Deserts	10.1	Cold Deserts	10.1.2	Columbia Plateau
10	North American Deserts	10.1	Cold Deserts	10.1.3	Northern Basin and Range
10	North American Deserts	10.1	Cold Deserts	10.1.4	Wyoming Basin
10	North American Deserts	10.1	Cold Deserts	10.1.5	Central Basin and Range
10	North American Deserts	10.1	Cold Deserts	10.1.6	Colorado Plateaus
10	North American Deserts	10.1	Cold Deserts	10.1.7	Arizona/New Mexico Plateau
10	North American Deserts	10.1	Cold Deserts	10.1.8	Snake River Plain
10	North American Deserts	10.2	Warm Deserts	10.2.1	Mojave Basin and Range
10	North American Deserts	10.2	Warm Deserts	10.2.2	Sonoran Desert
10	North American Deserts	10.2	Warm Deserts	10.2.3	Baja Californian Desert
10	North American Deserts	10.2	Warm Deserts	10.2.4	Chihuahuan Desert
11	Mediterranean California	11.1	Mediterranean California	11.1.1	Central California Foothills and Coastal Mountains
11	Mediterranean California	11.1	Mediterranean California	11.1.2	Central California Valley
11	Mediterranean California	11.1	Mediterranean California	11.1.3	Southern and Baja California Pine-Oak Mountains
11	Mediterranean California	11.1	Mediterranean California	11.1.4	Southern California/Northern Baja California Coast
12	Southern Semi-Arid Highlands	12.1	Western Sierra Madre Piedmont	12.1.1	Madrean Archipelago
12	Southern Semi-Arid Highlands	12.1	Western Sierra Madre Piedmont	12.1.2	Piedmonts and Plains with Grasslands, Xeric Shrub, and Oak and Conifer Forests
12	Southern Semi-Arid Highlands	12.2	Mexican High Plateau	12.2.1	Hills and Interior Plains with Xeric Shrub and Mesquite Low Forest
13	Temperate Sierras	13.1	Upper Gila Mountains	13.1.1	Arizona/New Mexico Mountains
13	Temperate Sierras	13.2	Western Sierra Madre	13.2.1	Sierra Madre Occidental with Conifer, Oak, and Mixed Forests
13	Temperate Sierras	13.3	Eastern Sierra Madre	13.3.1	Sierra Madre Oriental with Conifer, Oak, and Mixed Forests
13	Temperate Sierras	13.4	Transversal Neo-Volcanic System	13.4.1	Interior Plains and Piedmonts with Grasslands and Xeric Shrub
13	Temperate Sierras	13.4	Transversal Neo-Volcanic System	13.4.2	Hills and Sierras with Conifer, Oak, and Mixed Forests
13	Temperate Sierras	13.5	Southern Sierra Madre	13.5.1	Sierras of Jalisco and Michoacán with Conifer, Oak, and Mixed Forests
13	Temperate Sierras	13.5	Southern Sierra Madre	13.5.2	Sierras of Guerrero and Oaxaca with Conifer, Oak, and Mixed Forests
13	Temperate Sierras	13.6	Central American Sierra Madre and Chipas Highlands	13.6.1	Central American Sierra Madre with Conifer, Oak, and Mixed Forests
13	Temperate Sierras	13.6	Central American Sierra Madre and Chipas Highlands	13.6.2	Chiapas Highlands with Conifer, Oak, and Mixed Forest
14	Tropical Dry Forests	14.1	Dry Gulf of Mexico Coastal Plains and Hills	14.1.1	Coastal Plain with Low Tropical Deciduous Forest
14	Tropical Dry Forests	14.1	Dry Gulf of Mexico Coastal Plains and Hills	14.1.2	Hills and Sierra with Low Tropical Deciduous Forest and Oak Forest
14	Tropical Dry Forests	14.2	Northwestern Plain of the Yucatan Peninsula	14.2.1	Northwestern Yucatan Plain with Low Tropical Deciduous Forest
14	Tropical Dry Forests	14.3	Western Pacific Coastal Plain, Hills and Canyons	14.3.1	Sinaloa Coastal Plain with Low Thorn Tropical Forest and Wetlands
14	Tropical Dry Forests	14.3	Western Pacific Coastal Plain, Hills and Canyons	14.3.2	Sinaloa and Sonora Hills and Canyons with Xeric Shrub and Low Tropical Deciduous Forest
14	Tropical Dry Forests	14.4	Interior Depressions	14.4.1	Balsas Depression with Low Tropical Deciduous Forest and Xerophytic Shrub
14	Tropical Dry Forests	14.4	Interior Depressions	14.4.2	Chiapas Depression with Low Deciduous and Medium Semi-Deciduous Tropical Forest
14	Tropical Dry Forests	14.4	Interior Depressions	14.4.3	Valleys and Depressions with Xeric Shrub and Low Deciduous Forest
14	Tropical Dry Forests	14.5	Southern Pacific Coastal Plain and Hills	14.5.1	Tehuantepec Canyon and Plain with Low Tropical Deciduous Forest and Low Thorn Forest
14	Tropical Dry Forests	14.5	Southern Pacific Coastal Plain and Hills	14.5.2	South Pacific Hills and Piedmonts with Low Tropical Deciduous Forest
14	Tropical Dry Forests	14.6	Sierra and Plains of El Cabo	14.6.1	Los Cabos Plains and Hills with Low Tropical Deciduous Forest and Xeric Shrub
14	Tropical Dry Forests	14.6	Sierra and Plains of El Cabo	14.6.2	La Laguna Mountains with Oak and Conifer Forests
15	Tropical Wet Forests	15.1	Humid Gulf of Mexico Coastal Plains and Hills	15.1.1	Gulf of Mexico Coastal Plain with Wetlands and High Tropical Rain Forest
15	Tropical Wet Forests	15.1	Humid Gulf of Mexico Coastal Plains and Hills	15.1.2	Hills with Medium and High Evergreen Tropical Forest
15	Tropical Wet Forests	15.2	Plain and Hills of the Yucatan Peninsula	15.2.1	Plain with Low and Medium Deciduous Tropical Forest
15	Tropical Wet Forests	15.2	Plain and Hills of the Yucatan Peninsula	15.2.2	Plain with Medium and High Semi-Evergreen Tropical Forest
15	Tropical Wet Forests	15.2	Plain and Hills of the Yucatan Peninsula	15.2.3	Hills with High and Medium Semi-Evergreen Tropical Forest
15	Tropical Wet Forests	15.3	Sierra Los Tuxtlas	15.3.1	Los Tuxtlas Sierra with High Evergreen Tropical Forest
15	Tropical Wet Forests	15.4	Everglades	15.4.1	Southern Florida Coastal Plain
15	Tropical Wet Forests	15.5	Western Pacific Plain and Hills	15.5.1	Nayarit and Sinaloa Plain with Low Thorn Tropical Forest
15	Tropical Wet Forests	15.5	Western Pacific Plain and Hills	15.5.2	Jalisco/Nayarit Hills and Plains with Medium Semi-Evergreen Tropical Forest
15	Tropical Wet Forests	15.6	Coastal Plain and Hills of Soconusco	15.6.1	Coastal Plain and Hills with High and Medium-High Evergreen Tropical Forest and Wetlands

== See also ==
- Ecoregions defined by the Commission for Environmental Cooperation and partner agencies:
  - List of ecoregions in the United States (EPA)
  - Terrestrial Ecozones and Ecoregions of Canada originally published by Environment Canada.
- The conservation group World Wildlife Fund maintains an alternate classification system:
  - List of ecoregions in Canada (WWF)
  - List of ecoregions in Mexico
  - List of ecoregions in the United States (WWF)
  - List of terrestrial ecoregions (WWF)
