= Marine West Coast Forest =

Ecoregion of North America

The Marine West Coast Forest is a Level I ecoregion of North America designated by the Commission for Environmental Cooperation (CEC) in its North American Environmental Atlas. The region includes parts of Alaska, the Yukon, British Columbia, Washington, Oregon, and California.

== Topography/geography/soil ==
The region is strongly influenced by the large mountain ranges stretching throughout most of the coast. Changes in elevation cause changes in plant/animal diversity, this can be exemplified through observing the alpine tundra's vegetation which consists of shrubs, herbs, mosses, and lichens; while lower elevations, the temperate coastal forest hold magnificently large trees such as western hemlock, California redwood, and the red alder. These differences are in direct correlation with the availability of oxygen, and other nutrients at higher elevations. The mountains also create rain-shadow areas due to the clouds having to release their precipitation in order to get over the mountains, or be blocked all together. Trees, which perform better under stress, grow in these areas such as the Douglas fir. As for the soil, the region generally has a thin podzol soil, causing it to be extremely acidic. Farmers must compensate by applying fertilizers and lime to lower the acidic levels for agricultural viability. Digging even deeper the then soil within the region will reveal mostly igneous and sedimentary rock. Colluvium and morainal deposits make up most of the surface materials. Mountains, which so intensely affect the region, are massive formations resulting from upheaval caused by continental collisions

== Climate ==
The climate of the marine west coast forests is humid. According to the Köppen climate classification system, this climate is very damp throughout most of the year, receiving a great amount of rainfall along with heavy cloud cover. The marine climate can also be defined with its narrow range of temperatures throughout the year. Precipitation is ample and consistent in the marine west coast, with many days of rainfall and a large annual accumulation. Many areas in the marine west coast climate have more than 150 days of rainfall per a year, along with averaging around 50 to 250 centimeters per a year of total rainfall. The average temperatures of areas within the marine west coast forests usually range from 10 °C to 15 °C.

These mild temperatures are in collaboration with the moderating effect of ocean bodies on air temperatures due to the constant influx of oceanic air influencing the marine west coast throughout the year. The marine west coast is located in the path of westerly winds from the ocean that contribute to its cloudy skies, significant amount of precipitation, and mild temperatures. The rainfall, seasons, and temperature are all dependent on each other and are all affected by the global circulatory pattern.

== Hydrology ==
The main watersheds in the region are the Puget Sound and Columbia River Watershed. Due to the region’s proximity to the Pacific Ocean, this ecoregion experiences large amounts of precipitation annually, creating a very humid and wet climate. The majority of river and stream activity is directly influenced by the annual precipitation patterns. In the rainy season from October to May, most of the low elevation rivers and streams experience peak run off levels. Rivers and streams at higher elevation are more influenced by snow melt and therefore experience peak run off from late spring into early summer due to the snow melt. The permeability levels of bedrock in the area of interest dictate surface water in the region. Volcanic parent material, as found in Oregon, tends to result in lower levels of ground water due to the low permeability of the rock. Although areas with volcanic parent material may have fewer ground water aquifers, these areas tend to have better developed stream networks and higher stream drainage levels (Moore, 765). Areas with newer volcanic bedrock have higher levels of permeability, and are therefore more likely to have ground water aquifers. These areas will experience lower stream drainage densities and less developed stream networks due to the greater rate of ground water recharge (Moore, 765).

== Keystone plants ==
The plants in this region are responsible for holding the geography and geology of the area intact. The north–south orientation of the mountain ranges combines with the moist polar air masses and mild westerlies coming eastward off the Pacific Ocean to form a weather pattern that dominates the area. This pattern consists of a temperate moist zone on the west side of the mountains and a drier moderate climate on the east side. The moist conditions along with glacial valleys cut by the glaciers allow for a variety of plant life to thrive.

The softwood stands of the highlands are keystone species in maintaining land integrity. The ability of the firs and spruces to populate the high altitude and shallow soil works like glue to hold the soil in place. As you drop in altitude pines and cedars do the same for the lower slopes. Erosion control is key to keeping the glacial valleys and their rivers free from silt build up, which has the ability to devastate the salmon population, as well as holding the integrity of the mountain ranges.

== Dominant species ==
Marine West Coast Forests combine aquatic ecosystems with temperate rainforests to provide habitat for an abundance of wildlife. The sea otter is considered a keystone species because of the critical role it plays in maintaining the structure of the ecosystem. Sea otters feed on sea urchins, which are herbivores of kelps. A large mass of kelp can become an underwater kelp forest, which is considered by many to be one of the most productive and dynamic ecosystems on Earth. Two more dominant species found in the Marine West Coast Forest are the gray wolf and grizzly bears. Grizzly bears provide a connection between the marine coast and the forests when they eat nitrogen-rich salmon and transfer the nutrients to the forests. The Pacific salmon provide strong sources of nitrogen for the aquatic ecosystems. Due to the high precipitation in this Eco region, the nitrogen levels can be very low. The Pacific salmon helps to normalize the nitrogen levels. Without anyone of these species, the ecosystem would fall apart. The Marine West Coast Forests are a unique habitat for a diverse group of species.

== Threatened and endangered species ==
Several species struggle to survive in the ever disappearing and degrading ecosystems of the northwest. These species face a high risk of extinction; some iconic examples of those listed as threatened or endangered in this ecoregion include the giant sequoia, coast redwood, and marbled murrelet.

The giant sequoia and coast redwood are listed as a vulnerable under the IUCN Red List standards (Conifer Specialist Group 1998). Large-scale logging, felling 90 to 95 percent of the old-growth forest between 1856 and 1955, is primarily to blame for these species’ now limited range. The remainder of most populations of giant sequoias and coast redwoods is now almost entirely in parks and reserves. (Farjon & Page 1999) Fire prevention policy, however, is most to blame for the continued declining of populations, as the build-up of undergrowth hampers the regeneration of both species (Vankat 1977). Luckily, plans to improve management and plant trees on cleared land are in place. (Farjon & Page 1999)

Though the marbled murrelet is still considered abundant, its population has undergone a rapid decline, principally because the old-growth forests in which they breed are subject to logging (Piatt et al. 2006). Current estimates are nearly half of historic numbers, suggesting just 350,000 to 420,000 remain (Piatt et al. 2007). The IUCN has listed the species as endangered (BirdLife International 2012). Hard forest edges resulting from forest fragmentation greatly subject murrelet nests to corvid predation and other associated disturbances (Peery et al. 2004). Declines in areas where logging is not an issue can be explained by the overexploitation and subsequent collapse of the pacific sardine fishery. Nylon gill-nets in shallow waters and oil spills have cause considerable mortality, as well (Piatt & Naslund 1995). In response, conservation measures have been implemented to slow the species’ decline, including: the prevention of logging within identified breeding areas (Nelson 1997), the development of detailed research and recovery plans (Kaiser et al. 1994, CMMRT 2003, Escene 2007), and the protection of 179 square kilometers on Afognak Island by the Exxon Valdex Trustee Council (EVOSTC 1995).

== Environmental threats ==
The Marine West Coast Forest's primary environmental threats are human development and population growth, logging, spruce bark beetle populations, and invasive species. This ecological region is home to large cities like Vancouver, Portland, Anchorage, and Seattle. As these cities continue to grow in population, greater tracts of land are being developed, and more resources are needed to accommodate these higher populations. Logging is another large human induced environmental threat to the ecoregion. Logging causes habitat fragmentation and adversely affects important species such as spotted owl, grizzly bear, and Kermode "spirit" bears, who all require large tracts of land to survive. (Demarchi, Nelson, Kavanagh, Sims, Mann, 2013) The spruce-bark beetle is an insect that destroys spruce trees by tunneling into the bark of the trees. These beetles are widespread in the northern part of the ecoregion in states such as Alaska. The beetle’s distribution and survival rate has increased in the last decade due to climate change. Invasive species are also rampant in the ecoregion. These foreign plants and animals disrupt naturally occurring species in the ecoregion. Several solutions have been enacted to solve the environmental threats of the Marine West Coast Forest. Public land ownership is positively correlated with environmental preservation, as seen by the parts of the ecoregion located in Alaska. When land is privately owned, the most effective measures are education of the beautiful natural areas, smart land use, and planned efficient growth. (Oregon Department of Fish and Wildlife, 2006)

== Climate change ==
The Marine West Coast Forests are located along the coast and some islands of northern California up to Alaska. The rise of the sea level will increase soil erosion of these marine areas. (Coastal Areas Impacts and Adaptation) Depending on to what degree the sea level will rise, the introduction of salt water to the soil in the marine forest can slow and or destroy the growth of marine forest plants as well as the habitat of forest animals. Freshwater flow will greatly disrupt the ecology of the Marine West Coast Forest. The trend seems to be that wet regions are getting wetter and the dry regions are getting drier. (Song) The Marine West Coastal Region is a wet region that will most likely see these increases in precipitation levels.

The precipitation level increasing will change the stream chemistry of vital spawning areas for salmon. Spawning salmon are most successful when the water is cold and with a steady flow. (Coastal Areas Impacts & Adaptation) The rising temperature of the streams from rainfall instead of snowfall will be more likely to also develop and spread disease through salmon. (Coastal Areas Impacts & Adaptation) The estuaries, where the ocean and river water meet is a very vulnerable area. The rising sea level will bring more salt water into the estuaries. The salinity of the water will increase further up rivers and this can alter the mixing and flushing rates of the estuary, increasing pollution dramatically. The change of balance in an estuary will also decrease the buffer effect that estuaries have against storms.

== Level III ecoregions ==
The following Level III ecoregions are nested within the Marine West Coast Forest:

- Ahklun Mountains and Kilbuck Mountains (ecoregion)
- Alaska Peninsula Mountains (ecoregion)
- Coast Range (ecoregion)
- Coastal Western Hemlock-Sitka Spruce Forests (ecoregion)
- Cook Inlet (ecoregion)
- Pacific and Nass Ranges (ecoregion)
- Pacific Coastal Mountains (ecoregion)
- Strait of Georgia/Puget Lowland (ecoregion)
- Willamette Valley (ecoregion)
