= North American Deserts =

North American Deserts is a Level I terrestrial ecoregion of North America designated by the Commission for Environmental Cooperation (CEC) in its North American Environmental Atlas. The North American Deserts include both cold and hot deserts, which supply a variety of climates. Due to this fact, they are often used for agricultural, business, or petroleum purposes. These factors have been taking a toll on the desert climate, organisms, and landscape. These deserts are the Mojave, Sonoran, Chihuahuan and the Great Basin.

== Flora and fauna ==
=== Plant communities ===
The North American Deserts are home to a variety of plant species. These plants are categorized as either xerophytes, adapted to the arid conditions of the desert, or phreatophytes, which are plants with very deep roots that are dependent on a permanent water supply and survive by tapping groundwater.

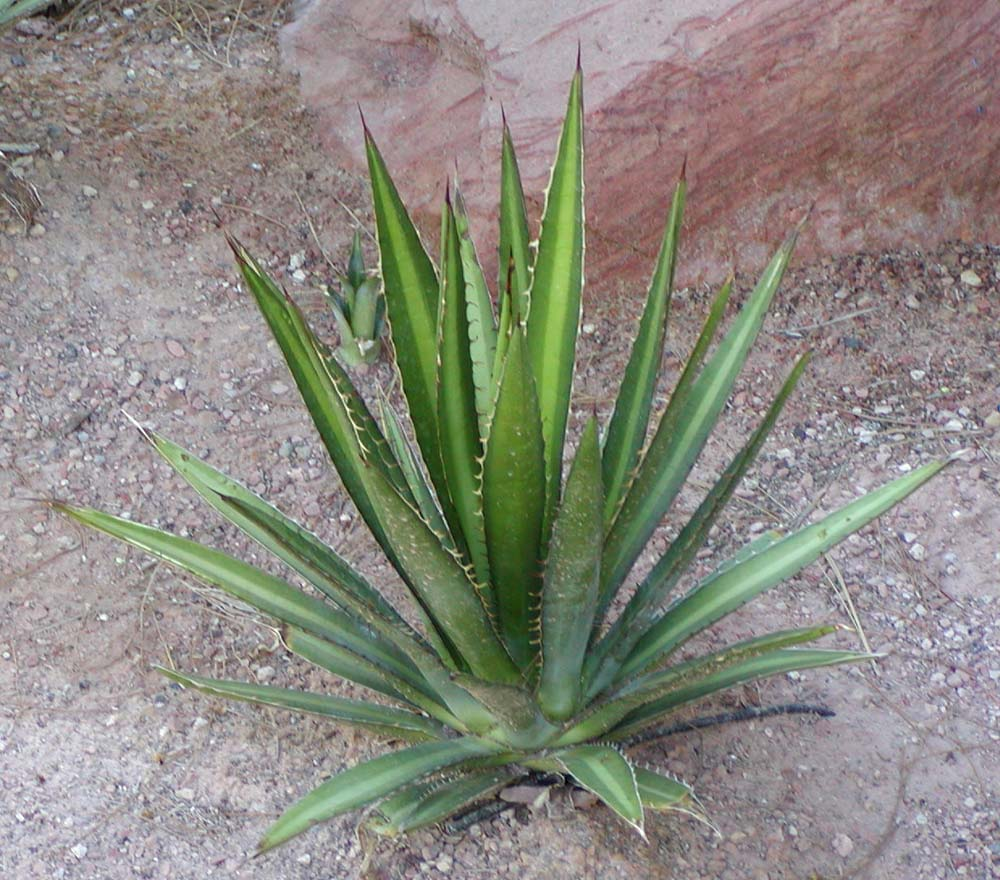
Agave lophantha

These species have come to possess several adaptations that allow them to survive and thrive in these dry and harsh conditions. One of the most common of these species is the barrel cactus (Echinocactus and Ferocactus). This plant was important to Native Americans and served a number of purposes, including use for food and water and creating fish hooks from the spines. Another common species is the Shin Digger (Agave lechuguilla).

With its shallow roots, it is able to take in a large quantity of water and store it in its pedals for extended periods of time. The Ocotillo (Fouquieria splendens) is another plant frequently found in this area, which is a very unusually shaped plant. Because of this, it is often referred to as a "vine cactus." This plant has an adaptive ability to photosynthesize during very dry conditions and gather large quantities of water when it is available. The Great Basin is also home to the oldest species in the world, the bristlecone pine (Pinus longaeva). Its needles allow it to retain water and use very little of it during its lifetime. It is able to grow on exposed rocky surfaces in higher elevations about forested areas. With these advantages come some drawbacks, including its very slow growth rate, which leaves it vulnerable to being out-competed by faster growing trees.

=== Animal species ===
There are a variety of mammals that define the North American Deserts such as the bighorn sheep, mule deer, white-tailed deer, ground squirrel, coyote, prairie dog, cottontail rabbit, desert packrat, and mountain lion. There are a number of birds and reptiles that thrive in these ecosystems as well. The cactus wren, Gambel's quail, burrowing owl, red-tailed hawk, hummingbird, desert tortoise, and vulture to name a few.

An example of a keystone species in the North American deserts would be the coyote or mountain lion. These two predators can control the population and distribution of a large number of prey species. A single mountain lion can roam an area of hundreds of kilometers, in which deer, rabbits, and bird species are partly controlled by a predator of this caliber. They will change the feeding behavior or where they decide to nest or burrow is largely a reaction to the mountain lions activity. Another example, such as the hummingbird, new plants or animals could also come into the habitat and push out native species. In the Sonoran Desert, the hummingbird pollinates many native species of cactus and other plants. The hummingbirds in this region, such as the Costa's hummingbird, have evolved to have very long beaks and tongues that wrap around the skull in order to reach the nectar for that sweet sugar staple.

=== Endangered species ===
The giant kangaroo rat is an unusual rodent. The Dipodomys ingens can grow up to 34.7 centimeters in length and have a tail of up to 19.8 centimeters long. They can weigh up to 180 grams. It is mainly found in the San Joaquin Valley in California. The giant kangaroo rat forages for food from sunset to sunrise. Its diet consists mainly of seeds, that are sun dried and some greenery. They store food in their cheeks until they bring it back to their burrow systems, where they store food that could last them up to 2 years of drought. The giant kangaroo rats develop rather quickly. Depending on the environmental conditions, they can reproduce after about 5 months. Their litter size varies but averages about 3.75 offspring. These rodents are rather resilient when it comes to surviving under natural conditions, such as drought and low plant productivity. However, when the human factor is introduced, they have a much less successful survival rate. Aqueducts and other water projects started crisscrossing the giant kangaroo rat habitat. Agriculture moved in because of the new water routes and suddenly the habitat of many species became agricultural land. Kangaroo rats became a pest for farmers and rodenticide-treated grain became common practice which took out another chunk of their population.

Nichol's Turk's head cactus (Echinocactus horizonthalonius var. nicholii) is one of multiple species of Echinocactus horizonthalonius. The Nichol's Turk's head cactus ranges from blue-green to yellow-green. It tends to be around 46 centimeters tall and has about a 20 centimeter diameter. It has 8 ribs that are lined with spines. The cactus blooms from April to May with a purple flower and white, hairy fruit. Like many cacti, it is rather slow growing at a rate of just 2 inches in 10 years, due to minimal nutrient input. Its habitat is located mainly in the Vekol and Waterman Mountains in Arizona and it has a population in the Sierra del Viejo Mountains of northwestern Sonora. The cactus is particularly fond of Horquilla limestone outcrops. The biggest threats to these cacti are habitat loss to new development, vehicle/off-roading damage, mining, and human collection. Among other threats, erosion from foot traffic from drug and human trafficking in the area.

== Topography, geology, and soils ==
The Great Basin Desert is the only Cold desert, bordered by the Rocky Mountain range to the east, and the Sierra Nevada – Cascade to the west. The northernmost part of the desert lies 2,000 metres (6,600 ft) above sea level, and due to high summer temperatures, not all of the fallen precipitation is fully absorbed into the soil, resulting in a high sodium concentration. In other areas, mountain erosion has caused deep soils of fine particles, which allows for standing lakes.

The Mojave lies between the Sonoran (south) and the Great Basin (north). Here, soil is shallow, rocky, and dry. The average elevation is between 3,000–6,000 feet (910–1,830 m) above sea level. The Mojave has several mountain range boundaries, the Garlock and the San Andres. They are made up of the two largest faults in the state of California.

The Sonoran is referred to as the Base and Range geologic province. Here, the Mogollon rim exists of sandstone and limestone piled over millions of years. The basin and valley were made from volcanic eruption 40 million years ago, and the underlying rock is made primarily of cretaceous (aged granites).

The Chihuahuan desert is made up of calcareous soils that have a high pH and calcium concentration. The soil is thin, sandy, and gravel like, and rests atop deep layers of limestone. Higher elevations allow water to sink deeper into soils that are made of finer particles, and deep sedimentary fans exist. Limestone beds show that this desert was at one point fully submerged beneath the sea. This desert features elevations ranging from 1,200 metres (3,900 ft) above sea level, to 350 metres (1,150 ft) below.

== Hydrology ==
There are common patterns of hydrological cycles throughout the North American Deserts, but specifics of times and source of water range. All four deserts rely on rivers, precipitation, and underground aquifers to replenish their water supply. The water in the North American desert is mainly freshwater. There is an ephemeral flow of underground water during the wet seasons that slows during each sub-desert's dry season. Oases form in all four deserts when the groundwater reaches the surface and pools in the hollows of the desert basins. Being surrounded by mountains provides a rain shadow effect that contributes to the dry climate and creates the desert ecosystem. All four deserts experience times of drought and times of intense precipitation. The Colorado River flows through the Mojave, Great Basin, and Sonoran desert.

But, differences in seasonal rain create the differing hydrological cycles. The Great Basin receives most its rainfall in the winter. This leads to creation of playa lakes in the spring, as the snowfall melts and flows down surrounding mountains. The Sonoran Desert has a bimodal precipitation pattern that includes winter storms and summer monsoons, which help sustain flora. The Chihuahuan Desert relies primarily on its intense summer monsoon for water. During the summer is when the area sees the accumulation of playa lakes. They may all have similar characteristics, but the difference in location and evaluation attribute to the diversity of their hydrological sources and cycles. Although the Northern American Deserts are characteristically dry, they still contain the water necessary to fuel their ecosystem and sustain the life of humans, animals, and plants alike.

== Climate ==
North American deserts can be categorized by climate categories of hot and cold deserts. The cold deserts include the Thompson Okanagan Plateau, Columbian Plateau, Northern and Central Basins, Colorado Plateaus, and the Snake River Plane.

All of these North American Deserts are included in the cold category, which indicates that they have a dry mid-latitude steppe or desert climate. These areas are affected by their interior position within the continent leading to broader temperature ranges and considerable rainfall. More specifically, these areas are affected by the rain shadow created by neighboring mountain ranges, acting as a barrier to westerly flowing air carrying moisture. All of these cold deserts experience about 100–300 mm of precipitation in a year indicating a semi-arid climate.

The warm deserts of North America include The Mojave Basin and Range, the Sonoran desert, and the Chihuahuan desert. These areas have a tropical desert climate, and are known as the hottest and driest place on the continent. This is due to the continental interior location on the leeward side of mountains, with constant subtropical high pressures. The high temperatures throughout the year are due to the high percentage of sunshine caused by high sun angles. Increased distance from a body of water leads to a lack of clouds, which is associated with much cooler nighttime temperatures because all the heat of the day is lost. The only source of water in the warm deserts is an oasis; this creates an arid climate in the area distinguishable by the lack of moisture in the soil due to annual precipitation being less than half of the annual potential evapotranspiration.

=== Climate change ===
North American Deserts, as in most arid systems, experience water and temperature change as the most limiting factors in this ecoregion. Climate change's major effects thus far have been an increase in average annual temperature as well as an increase in average annual rainfall.

The most prevalent factor is the increase in rainfall events and the severity of the events. Between 1931 and 2000, there have been measurable increases in seasonal rainfall during the summertime monsoon in the southern United States and northern Mexico. Because of this increase in rainfall, changes in the vegetative cover have caused native species to disappear and invasive species populations to rise. The kangaroo rat, which also supported Mojave rattlesnake and burying owl populations, has essentially disappeared from the Chihuahan Desert, while the non-native Bailey's pocket mouse has colonized the area. Increased rainfall has also led to decrease in soil quality and less vegetative cover, which leads to increasingly higher temperatures. In the Sonoran Desert, anthropogenic land degradation as well as natural erosion from increased rainfall has caused a 4–5 degree increase in average afternoon temperatures, which means for many species less available water and nutrients they need to survive. These effects will lead to less biodiversity in the area, which is one of the main combatant factors that biota have against climate change.

As the effects of climate change continue to develop, North American Deserts will be increasingly affected, leading worsening biodiversity loss and decreases in the ecoregion productivity. Deserts are one of the most delicate ecosystems, relying on limited water and nutrient sources to survive. When these careful relationships are disturbed by the unpredictable and worsening effects of climate change, it will be very hard for these ecosystems to recover or endure.

== Economy ==
=== Natural resources ===
In the North American Deserts there are emerging natural resources within the ecosystem. A few natural resources within the desert consist of oil, sunlight, copper, zinc, and water. Some of these resources are renewable and some are non-renewable. Most of these resources are being exploited by humans and most actions are not sustainable.

Sunlight is a renewable resource in deserts and can be used to generate energy. In North America, areas such as New Mexico, Texas, Arizona and the Great Basin host fields of solar panels that produce renewable energy. Sunlight also provides energy for the plants and animals of desert ecosystems, and solar panels have been installed to produce energy for human use. Water is another desert resource that can be reused.

Oil is the most exploited resource within the deserts. In the North American desert most of the oil is found within the Great Basin region and this resource is non-renewable. Oil is mined out of rocks and creates massive holes that disrupt the ecosystem. The process with taking oil is not sustainable and this resource is scarce.

Another resource that is mined is copper. Along with oil, this resource is also scarce as it is non-renewable and also has the same mining affects as oil does. This resource can be used for things such as computers, TVs, cell phones, and other electronics. Copper is mainly found in California. Other mined resources consist of zinc, uranium, rocks, jade, crystals, gold, and quartz.

=== Environmental concerns ===
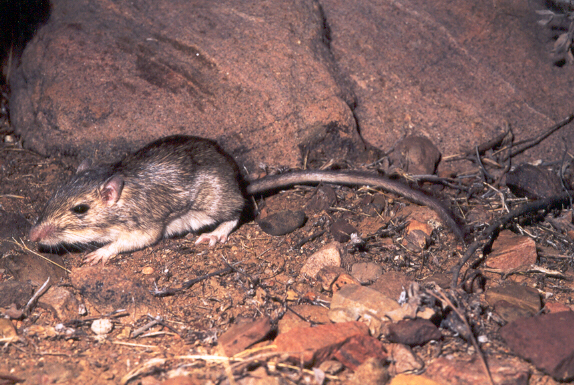
Bailey's pocket mouse

The North American Desert biome is facing a variety of ecological threats. Human disturbance poses the number one concern to this fragile ecosystem. The Sonoran desert contains the two large cities of Tucson and Phoenix, Arizona, which contain over 3 million people. These dense human populations deplete the water table of the entire desert and are sending the desert towards desertification.

Also, the Chihuahuan desert is seeing the effects of agricultural expansions, invasive species, illegal poaching, and extractions of resources such as salt, lime, and sand. These activities in the desert lead to eventual desertification and a loss of overall biodiversity. A number of organizations such as the United States Nature Conservancy and the World Wildlife Fund have begun working together to conserve the threatened desert ecosystem. The less heavily populated areas of the desert are being sought out and conserved in order to prevent future human habitation and disturbance.

Also, several organizations are now monitoring the use and health of the Rio Grande system located in the Chihuahuan desert, while also building new low tech water treatment facilities that will help to prevent overall water table depletion. The World Wildlife Fund is replanting disturbed, upland vegetation in order to retain species habitat and biodiversity. These measures are helping to protect and preserve the four North American Desert ecosystems.
