= Northwestern Forested Mountains =

Ecoregion of North America

The Northwestern Forested Mountains is a Level I ecoregion of North America designated by the Commission for Environmental Cooperation (CEC) in its North American Environmental Atlas.

== Hydrology ==
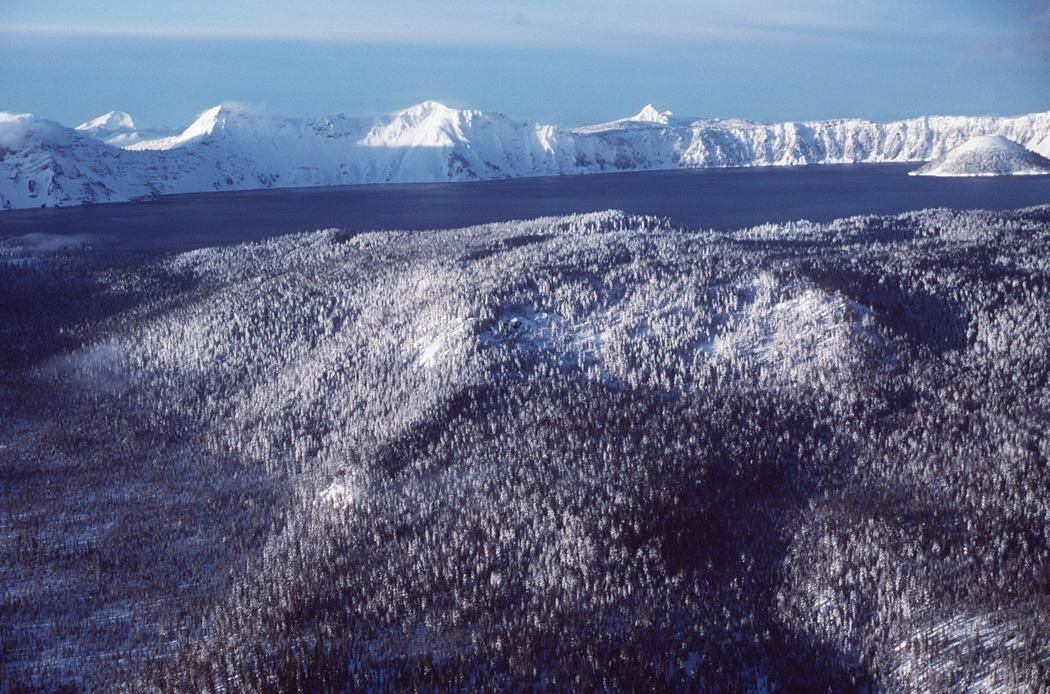
Crater Lake, Oregon

Most of the water in this ecoregion is fresh water and contained in rivers, lakes, and groundwater. Washington, Oregon, and Idaho are mainly drained by the Columbia River, its tributaries, and other streams that flow to the Pacific Ocean. The Columbia River Basin is the fourth largest watershed in North America. According to a 2004 GIS inventory by the Environmental Protection Agency, there are approximately 10,535 lakes and reservoirs in the Pacific Northwest. The largest lakes in the Pacific Northwest include Lake Washington, Lake Roosevelt, Lake Chelan, Upper Klamath Lake, Lake Pend Oreille, Priest Lake, and Lake Coeur d'Alene.

In British Columbia, the Fraser River watershed covers one-fourth of the land and extends from Mount Robson to the Georgia Strait and Gulf Islands. This basin is the fifth largest drainage basin in Canada and contains thirteen main sub-watersheds, each consisting of small rivers, streams, creeks, marshes, bogs, and swamps. The largest lake in British Columbia is Williston Lake which covers 680 square miles (1,800 km^{2}).

Alaska contains abundant natural resources which include ground and surface water. The southwestern part of Alaska is drained by the Yukon River and its tributaries that include the Porcupine, Tanana, and Koyukuk Rivers. The Yukon River is the third longest river and fourth largest drainage basin in North America with a drainage area of 832,700 square kilometres (321,500 sq mi). Alaska contains over three million lakes and the largest is Lake Iliamna which covers an area of 1,000 square miles (2,600 km^{2}).

== Vegetative cover ==
Vegetative cover is extremely diverse within the northwestern forested mountain ecological region as the region can be broken down into different zones based on elevation, temperature, and mean annual rainfall.

Alpine communities; areas of high elevation (> 8,200 feet (2,500 m)) can support the growth of herbs, grasses, lichen, and shrubs well adapted for these harsh conditions. Common plants here include mountain sorrel, capitate sedge, mat muhly, Newberry knotweed, and red huckleberry. Lichens such as the witch's hair lichen and cup lichen also persist here.

Subalpine communities; located below the alpine communities (6,500 to 8,200 feet (2,000 to 2,500 m)) support the presence of lodgepole pine, subalpine fir, pacific silver fir, grand fir, and Engelmann spruce. The Engelmann spruce–subalpine fir forest association occupies the greatest water-yielding areas in the Rocky Mountains and the natural adaptations of these trees are important in maintaining stable vegetation.

The mountainous slopes and rolling plains slope from about 5,500 feet (1,700 m) at the foot of the Rocky Mountains to about 2,000 feet (610 m) in the lowest elevations. The dominant trees present in the region consist of ponderosa pine, Rocky Mountain Douglas fir, lodgepole pine, and quaking aspen in the drier southeast and central portions. Western hemlock, western red cedar, Douglas fir, and western white pine make up the majority of the moist west and southwest portions. White spruce is also found at this elevation and is a keystone tree species found in the Alaskan interior.

The dry southern interior grasslands and forests generally occur at low elevations (under 4,000 feet (1,200 m)) and usually have a lower canopy closure than forests at higher elevations that receive more precipitation They are characterized by very warm to hot, dry summers, and moderately cool winters with little snowfall. Frequent low-severity, stand-maintaining fires are thought to have played a key historic role in shaping these ecosystems. Much of this area consists of small scrub-like ponderosa pine with bluebunch wheatgrass, bluegrass, June-grass, and big sagebrush dominating the understory.

== Flora and fauna ==
This ecoregion is abundant with varying types of mammals, fish, and birds. Many dominant animal species, such as the bighorn sheep and hoary marmot, have adapted to the terrain of the region. The talus slopes provide burrowing shelters for the hoary marmot, and the bighorn sheep have adapted to climb the steep slopes to find shelter from predators. Top carnivorous predators include coyotes, wolves, and cougars. The grizzly bear is a keystone species found in this region. As an "ecosystem engineer", they regulate the species they prey on, disperse plant seeds, aerate the soil as they dig, and bring salmon carcasses into the forest. The dominant fish species of the region, in which the grizzly bear preys on, is pacific salmon. The typical bird species that can be found here include blue grouse, Steller's jay, and black-billed magpie.

=== Endangered species ===
The northern spotted owl (Strix occidentalis caurina) is considered a species of utmost concern in the Northwestern Forested Mountains region. This small raptor was listed as threatened under the Endangered Species Act of 1973. The current population is 15,000 birds, all of which are located in North America. Over 70% of the species' habitat was destroyed in the 19th and 20th centuries, and continued demand from the timber industry is contributing to further habitat loss. Both northern spotted owls and the timber industry prefer old-growth forests, so as demand for timber products increases, the spotted owl's habitat decreases. Forest management plans that stress limits on timber harvest and suggest alternative options are being formed, along with plans to prevent habitat fragmentation.

The barred owl is also causing a decrease in the population numbers of the northern spotted owl, as they are a larger, more competitive species that have begun to use the same habitat, however, no major plans have been formed to manage this situation.

Malheur wire-lettuce (Stephanomeria malheurensis) is also an endangered species in the region. Only one population of this plant survives in the wild, located in Harney, Oregon. The self-pollinating shrub is found at high elevations in volcanic soils. Because the range is so small, any disturbance in the habitat could be detrimental. One of the main threats is cheatgrass, which can expand to completely cover the ground and use up resources also needed by Malheur wire-lettuce. It is generally agreed that to protect the species, efforts must be focused on forming new populations, and more importantly, maintaining the condition of the current site in Oregon.

== Natural resources ==
The Northwestern Forested Mountain ecoregion is rich in natural resources. Historically the most sought-after resources were the minerals found here. The presence of gold drove many of the early settlers to this ecoregion. These early settlers extracted gold from the streams, and timber for building, flora, and fauna. Today, many more resources are used by the economies of this area. Large-scale mining operations have become less common throughout the entirety of the region. There are a few prospective industrial mines lobbying for permits to dig in both Canada and Alaska.

Canada is the 6th-largest petroleum producer in the world. The largest point of extraction within this ecoregion is in Alberta, Canada. This area is abundant in tar sands, a crude form of petroleum. To begin this operation large tracts of boreal forest are removed. After the large pits are dug there is a constant risk of further environmental degradation through oil spillage.

Logging in the past was often conducted through large clear cuts. The environmental effects of large clear-cuts became apparent and are now less common. There are logging techniques that can benefit the ecological integrity of a system. Group selection can mimic natural processes and increase both the horizontal and vertical structures of a forest. As well as increase the biotic diversity of both flora and fauna.

Tourism generates a considerable amount of revenue for the different economies of this area. Tourists come to these areas for a multitude of outdoor activities. In the winter tourists travel from all across the globe to ski the Rocky Mountains, British Columbia, and Alaska ranges. In the summer the national parks draw in millions. Other summer activities include but are not limited to hunting, fishing, mountain biking, backpacking, rafting, kayaking, and wildlife viewing/photography. Resource use and extraction is sustainable when a system can replenish resources faster than they are being used. A practice is unsustainable when usage exceeds this threshold thereby damaging the ecological integrity of the ecoregion.

== Climate ==
Extending from the lower Yukon of Canada all the way into northern California and Nevada, the northwestern-forested mountains range in different about three climate zones; moist maritime, arid dry, and sub-arctic.

The moist maritime climate of the Northwestern Forested Mountains is found along a narrow strip of coastal Oregon, Washington, British Columbia, and southern Alaska in North America. It is formed by westerly winds coming off of the Pacific Ocean, which hit the mountains and rises to a cooler atmosphere. This causes rainy, cloudy, and moist atmospheric conditions where up to 100 inches (2,500 mm) of rain per year can be seen, and is a temperate zone ranging from about 15 °F (−9 °C) in the winter to about 65 °F (18 °C) in the summer.

The arid dry zone is west of the mountain ranges and doesn't receive much rain due to the north-to-south orientation of the mountains, which blocks clouds and precipitation. It can range from the upper 80s (°F) in the summer to single digits in the winter. It generally only receives about 20 inches (510 mm) of rain per year.

The sub-arctic region ranges from Fairbanks, Alaska, to the Yukon of Canada and averages a mean of 50 °F (10 °C) in the summer and is often −13 °F (−25 °C) in the winter. On the mountain tops, it can receive up to 100 inches (2,500 mm) of precipitation per year, and is often considered the snowiest place on Earth.

The Northwestern Forested Mountains experience phenomena called decadal oscillations, the La Niña and El Niño. This is a shift in temperatures from warmer (La Niña) to colder (El Niño) and each phase generally last about a decade. These phases are caused by many factors including, jet streams, trade winds, precipitation, land surface, temperature, ocean surface temperature, and sea level pressure.

=== Environmental threats to the Northwestern Forested Mountains ===
The biggest threats to this region are fires and invasive pests. As fires occur, they alter the forest composition dramatically. Fire scars create an entry for heart rot and other fatal conditions. Burned soils repel water and the runoff creates sediment and ash polluting rivers and streams, and harming fish and wildlife that depend on these water sources. An especially troubling aspect of fires' aftermath is the increased vulnerability of trees to non-native invasive pests. Burned stands create a perfect habitat for pests who will find shelter in the regrowth. These pests create tunneling galleries that further weaken a tree's ability to fend off pathogens that lead to mortality.

Preventing forest fires and controlling pest populations go hand-in-hand, which leaves room for any combination of treatment plans. What is especially helpful is the use of prescribed burns, in which land managers deliberately set and closely monitor fires under carefully selected weather and fuel-moisture conditions in order to reduce accumulated fuel loads in a controlled manner. After the fire, workers must go in to peel bark off felled logs, and, if possible, remove dead, dying, and severely damaged/stressed trees as soon as possible.

=== Climate change in the Northwestern Forested Mountains ===
The effects of fossil fuel emissions, the largest contributor to climate change, cause rising CO_{2} levels in the Earth's atmosphere. This raises atmospheric temperatures and levels of precipitation in the Northwestern Forested Mountains. Being a very mountainous region, weather patterns contribute to higher levels of precipitation. This can cause landslides, channel erosion, and floods. The warmer air temperatures also create more rain and less snow, something dangerous for many animal and tree species; with less snowpack comes more vulnerability for trees and insects.

A large contributor to fire susceptible forests is past land use; the higher air temperatures make wildfires more common. Wildfires are extremely detrimental to species inhabiting the landscape; they destroy habitats and it takes many years to restore the land to how it used to be.

These effects caused by climate change can destroy animal habitats and species diversity. Not only will these climate catastrophes directly reduce animal populations, but they will indirectly disrupt trophic levels by reducing food sources for many keystone species. Climate change contributes to a worsening economy in this region as well by taking away valuable resources for recreational uses, like snow for skiing and fish for fishing.

== Subregions ==
=== Boreal Cordillera ===
- Alaska Range (ecoregion)
- Copper Plateau (ecoregion)
- Interior Highlands and Klondike Plateau (ecoregion)
- Watson Highlands (ecoregion)
- Wrangell and St. Elias Mountains (ecoregion)
- Yukon-Stikine Highlands/Boreal Mountains and Plateaus (ecoregion)

=== Western Cordillera ===
- Blue Mountains (ecoregion)
- Canadian Rockies (ecoregion)
- Cascades (ecoregion)
- Chilcotin Ranges and Fraser Plateau (ecoregion)
- Columbia Mountains/Northern Rockies (ecoregion)
- Cypress Upland (ecoregion)
- Eastern Cascades Slopes and Foothills (ecoregion)
- Idaho Batholith (ecoregion)
- Klamath Mountains (ecoregion)
- Middle Rockies (ecoregion)
- North Cascades (ecoregion)
- Sierra Nevada (ecoregion)
- Skeena-Omineca-Central Canadian Rocky Mountains (ecoregion)
- Southern Rockies (ecoregion)
- Wasatch and Uinta Mountains (ecoregion)
