= Tundra of North America =

The location of the tundra in North America is highlighted in light blue.

The Tundra of North America is a Level I ecoregion of North America designated by the Commission for Environmental Cooperation (CEC) in its North American Environmental Atlas.

One of the planet's most recent biomes, a result of the last ice age only 10,000 years ago, the tundra contains unique flora and fauna formed during the last glaciation in areas unrestricted by permanent ice. The tundra region is found in high latitudes, primarily in Alaska, Canada, Russia, Greenland, Iceland, and Scandinavia, as well as the Antarctic Islands. Consisting of the arctic, alpine, and Antarctic regions, and stemming from the Samer language, tundra literally means a "high and dry place".

The arctic tundra has an exceptionally short growing period, minimal sunlight, and limited resources, creating a brutal environment for plants and animals. By adapting to these harsh conditions, animals and plants represent iconic characteristics of the tundra. Plants grow in aggregated formations which provide shelter from wind, and ice and also improve seed success. Animals have adapted with specialized organs, such as a rete mirabile, an organ that efficiently transfers heat. Frogs and amphibians use "anti-freeze" to prevent organ damage while hibernating. Polar bears, foxes, and owls use insulated fur and feathers to protect from the cold conditions. These complex interactions between plants, animals and abiotic factors in the tundra are held together by the permafrost layer, located 450 metres (1,480 ft) under the soil. However climate change is causing this crucial layer of frozen soil to melt. As a result, tundra communities are becoming unstable and basic processes are breaking down. Other factors such as oil development and drilling in tundra ecosystems have completely disheveled the wildlife and vegetation populations. Tundra exploration vehicles used for oil development and polar bear tours ("an eco-friendly" industry) leave traces of tire marks for 20-plus years after a disturbance occurs. Other factors such as high CO_{2} emissions from tourism and from warming tundra soil, create a positive feedback loop, accelerating changes to the tundra.

== Flora and fauna ==
=== Plant communities ===
The adversity of soil and climatic conditions proves to low production levels, as well as little biomass accumulation due to slow rates of nutrient release in cold and wet soils, specifically as a result of limited nitrogen and phosphorus (Nadelhoffer et al. 1996) Additionally, there are low temperatures and strong winds in the tundra causing most vegetation to be dominated by woody plants that hug the soil. Within the tundra, some dominant plant species include lichen, cotton grass, and Arctic willow.

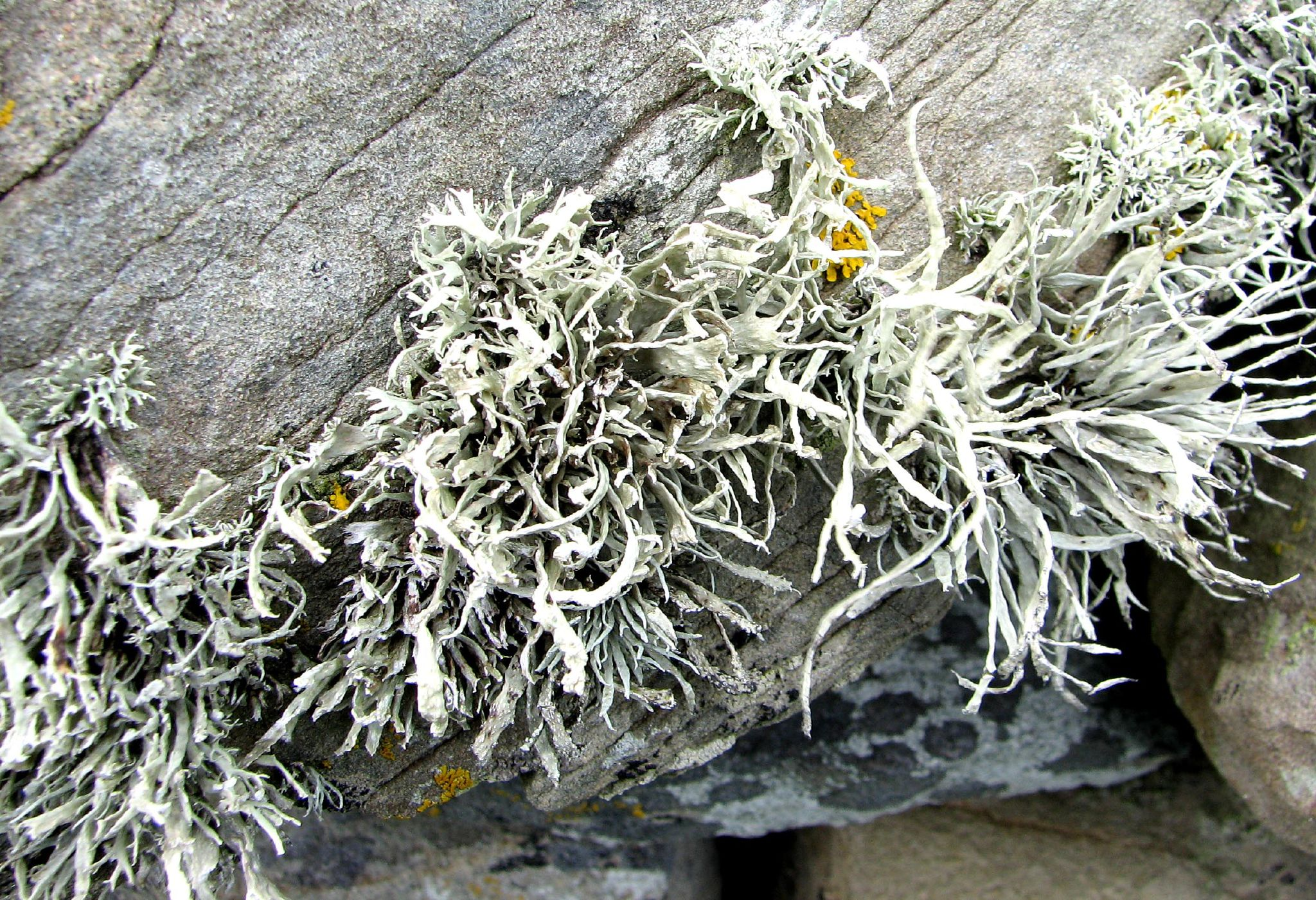
Lichens

Lichens dominate the tundra as the region's major primary producer. A symbiotic combination of algae and fungi, a lichen is able to survive in the harsh conditions of the tundra (Biodiversity Institute of Ontario et al. 2010). Their unique structure and survivability make lichen a prominent and keystone plant species in the tundra ecosystem.

Cotton grass is another dominant plant species in the tundra producing much of its growth early in the summer. Being a member of the sedge family, it forms a large part of the vegetation in the tundra because it is able to deal with harsh and cold temperatures. This perennial plant contains flowering heads with dense bristles that are spread during heavy winds, enabling pollination (Wein and Bliss 1974). Additionally, its survivability in the tundra can be attributed to cotton grass's ability to photosynthesize in low temperatures and low light.

The Arctic willow, commonly named rock willow, is found in the North American tundra. Most uniquely, the Arctic willow often has long trailing branches that root where they intersect with the surface of the ground, and the roots are shallow as to thrive in the frozen ground of the tundra (Wielgolaski 1972).

In addition to species such as lichens, cotton grass, and Arctic willows, shrubs, sedges, lichens, mosses, and vascular plants dominate the tundra plant community (Folch and Camarasa 2000). Despite the tundra eco-region's reputation of being a cold and desolate ‘polar desert’, it is actually a varying landscape supporting a diverse amount of plant and animal species.

=== Animal species ===
Since the tundra has such a harsh environment, the animals who live here have adapted in a way to call the tundra their home. The keystone species of the tundra can be as small as a lemming to as large as a musk ox. The low biodiversity means that fluctuation in individual animals can substantially affect the entire ecosystem. The main predators of the tundra are the polar bear, the Arctic wolf, and the Arctic fox. They all have thick white coats that help them blend into their environment and stalk prey. The polar bear spends the majority of its time out on the ice hunting seals and sometimes when small rodents are scarce on land the Arctic fox will follow the bears and eat their scraps. Wolves use teamwork to attack herds of caribou or musk ox for food. Lemming are small rodents that fluctuate every three to four years and with their fluctuations also comes the fluctuation of their predators such as the Arctic fox and the snowy owl. The keystone herbivores are the musk ox and the caribou. They have thick shaggy coats that they shed during the warmer months. Caribou use their nimble legs to escape quickly from predators while the musk ox uses each other to make a fierce wall of horns. These animals help keep each other alive as well as the ecosystem around them.

=== Endangered species ===
Though species have adapted to the harsh climate of the tundra, several species have become endangered due to changing environmental factors. Both plant species and animal species have become endangered. The Aleutian shield fern is a plant species that have been endangered due to caribou tramping and grazing, slumping from growing substrate, and human foot traffic. Animal species that are endangered in the tundra include the Arctic fox, caribou, and polar bears. These animals have been endangered due to overhunting, an infestation of disease, loss of diet and habitat due to climate change, and human destructive activities, such as searches for natural gas and oil, mining, and road building. In an effort to conserve these endangered species, many regulations and standards are being put into action along with establishing the prohibition of unauthorized plant collecting. Standards are being set in regard to mining and mineral exploration. This will help in not disturbing the habitats as much. In addition to this, the protection of caribou grounds has been established along with regulations in regard to the removal of gravel roads for airstrips and road fill, which takes away from many of the animals’ critical territories.

== Geology, topography and soil ==
The tundra is an extremely harsh, cold, windy, and unique ecosystem found on the extreme north and south latitudes of Earth. The soil consists mostly of frozen permafrost, which makes it difficult for extended root systems to grow, and water to drain and support a wide variety of plant life. This permafrost is also responsible for creating an extremely unusual topography. The land of the tundra is constantly changing as permafrost and snow melts and refreezes through the changing seasons. Land slumps and depressions occur as a result of melting permafrost which takes up less space when the soil was frozen. Depressions that occur as a result of melting permafrost are known as thermokarst, and are often in the form of pits, funnel-shaped sinkholes, valleys, ravines, and sometimes caves. Pingos are another feature of the tundra and can be defined as a cone-shaped hill or mound of soil with a core of ice. Lastly, polygons make up a crucial part of the tundra and are created when two large cracks create a large ice wedge and slowly slump into itself filling with water as heat from sunlight melts the permafrost. Often small lakes are formed from polygons on the surface of the tundra.

Current threats to the tundra biotope including mining, oil drilling, increased habitat loss, human habitations moving farther north, and global warming which is melting the permafrost and disrupting soil balance.

== Climate ==
The tundra is characterized by a harsh, frost-laden landscape with negative temperatures, a lack of precipitation and nutrients, and extremely short seasons. In the winter it is cold and dark, and in the summer when the snow and the top layer of permafrost melt, it is very soggy and the tundra is covered with marshes, lakes, bogs, and streams. Spring and fall are only short periods between winter and summer. In the peak of winter, average temperatures can reach −30 °F. In arctic regions, there generally is not a great difference between daytime highs and nighttime lows, as the sun generally never rises or simply hangs briefly on the horizon. Summers in the tundra, on the other hand, is very short, in some locations only lasting a few weeks. Daily temperatures can reach up to 60 °F (16 °C) but overnight lows go down into the 30s, 20s, or lower, depending on the region. This results in daily average temperatures coming out to around 50 °F (10 °C). It may rain or snow, and frost still occurs. The average annual temperature is −18 °F. Nights can last for weeks, and when the sun barely rises during some months in the winter, the temperature can drop to −94 °F. During the summer the sun shines almost 24 hours a day. Temperatures can get up to 54 °F (12 °C) but it can get as cold as 37 °F (3 °C). Average summer temperatures range from 37 °F (3 °C) to 60 °F (16 °C). The tundra is very much like a desert in terms of precipitation. Yearly average precipitation varies by region, but generally, there is only about 6–10 inches (150–250 mm) of precipitation per year, and in some regions, it can have up to 20 inches (510 mm). This precipitation usually falls in the form of light, fluffy snow.

For more information about the tundra climate, look at this article.

== Environmental threats ==
Due to its vulnerable state, the powerful forces of climate change, ozone depletion, air pollution, and construction threaten the tundra's survival. The melting of permafrost increases as a result of global warming, which could drastically alter both the landscape and the biodiversity of the region. The ozone depletion at both the North and South Poles increases the strength of ultraviolet rays that harm the tundra. Air pollution around the world creates smog clouds that contaminate the lichen in the ecosystem, which is a major food source in the region. The construction of pipelines and roads to obtain oil, gas, and minerals cause physical disturbances and habitat fragmentation. There are a number of possible solutions, according to National Geographic, including switching to alternative energy, establishing protected areas and park reserves to restrict human influence, limiting road construction, mining activities, and the building of pipelines in tundra habitat, and limiting tourism and respecting local cultures. The creation of the Arctic National Refuge is an example of a measure being enacted to protect the North American tundra. The Arctic Refuge was originally created in 1960 by the Public Land Order 2214, which was created "for the purpose of preserving unique wildlife, wilderness, and recreational values" and "withdrawn from all forms of appropriation under the public land laws, including the mining but not the mineral leasing laws, nor disposals of materials". In 1980, the Alaska National Interest Lands Conservation Act (ANILCA) re-designated the Range as a part of the larger Arctic National Wildlife Refuge, and declared "that the ‘production of oil and gas from the Arctic National Wildlife Refuge is prohibited and no leasing or other development leading to production of oil and gas from the [Refuge] shall be undertaken until authorized by an act of Congress’".

=== Effects of climate change ===
The tundra is one of the first places on Earth we have noted the effects of climate change. As an indicator biome, the tundra is a crucial part of the whole global climate system and can help predict the changes the rest of the world will face. The Earth depends on regulating mechanisms and air circulation patterns the tundra provides to keep climates steady worldwide. Human-induced climate change is devastating the tundra because intense complications are present in remote areas, free from human interference. Changes in climate, permafrost, ice pack and glacier formations pose a serious threat to the stability of global climate because these conditions are influenced and reinforced by positive feedback loops. Temperatures in the tundra are rising to the highest temperatures recorded in four centuries and are rising more rapidly than anywhere worldwide The land surfaces in the tundra are no longer reflecting radiation from the sun out of the atmosphere. Soils and open water are absorbing heat from the sun and leading to more warming. Changes in the tundra influence climate change in lower latitudes because air pressure changes are shifting global air and ocean circulation patterns. Sea ice extent in the tundra has reached the lowest recorded levels in centuries and this will dramatically affect people and wildlife worldwide. Changes in climate will be noticed first and seen most intensely in the northern regions of the planet. The tundra will show the effects of climate change the soonest and will hopefully serve as a catalyst for action for people all over the world.

== Natural resources ==
According to the US Energy Information Administration, the arctic tundra holds an estimated 13% or 90 billion barrels of the world's undiscovered conventional oil sources. However, there are a number of challenges to oil exploration, drilling, and transportation in an arctic tundra environment that limits the profitability of the venture. Oil and gas fields in the arctic need to be large, with lots of proven reserves, because oil companies need that money to make the investment profitable. Natural gas is a more recoverable resource than oil in tundra eco-regions. It is estimated that there are 221.4 million undiscovered, technically recoverable cubic feet of natural gas in the Arctic. Oil sands, often pejoratively referred to as tar sands, are a phenomenon unique to the tundra environment and are profitable and plentiful in the Athabasca region of the Alberta sands. Oil sands consist of bitumen, which contains petroleum, found in a natural state combined with clays, sands, and water. Oil sands must be heavily processed and refined to yield synthetic crude oil, similar to conventional crude oil. Arctic tundra may contain minerals such as coal, copper, gold, iron, nickel, diamonds, and the base feedstock for uranium oxide called pitchblende.

== Subregions ==
=== Northern Arctic ===
- Baffin Uplands (ecoregion)
- Banks Island and Amundsen Gulf Lowlands (ecoregion)
- Ellesmere Mountains and Eureka Hills (ecoregion)
- Foxe Uplands (ecoregion)
- Gulf of Boothia and Foxe Basin Plains (ecoregion)
- Lancaster and Borden Peninsula Plateaus (ecoregion)
- Parry Islands Plateau (ecoregion)
- Sverdrup Islands Lowland (ecoregion)
- Victoria Island Lowlands (ecoregion)

=== Alaska Tundra ===
- Aleutian Islands (ecoregion)
- Arctic Coastal Plain (ecoregion)
- Arctic Foothills (ecoregion)
- Bristol Bay-Nushagak Lowlands (ecoregion)
- Seward Peninsula (ecoregion)
- Subarctic Coastal Plains (ecoregion)

=== Brooks Range Tundra ===
- Brooks Range/Richardson Mountains (ecoregion)

=== Southern Arctic ===
- Aberdeen Plains (ecoregion)
- Amundsen Plains (ecoregion)
- Central Ungava Peninsula and Ottawa and Belcher Islands (ecoregion)
- Queen Maud Gulf and Chantrey Inlet Lowlands (ecoregion)
