= Tropical Wet Forests (US and Mexico) =

Level I ecoregion of North America

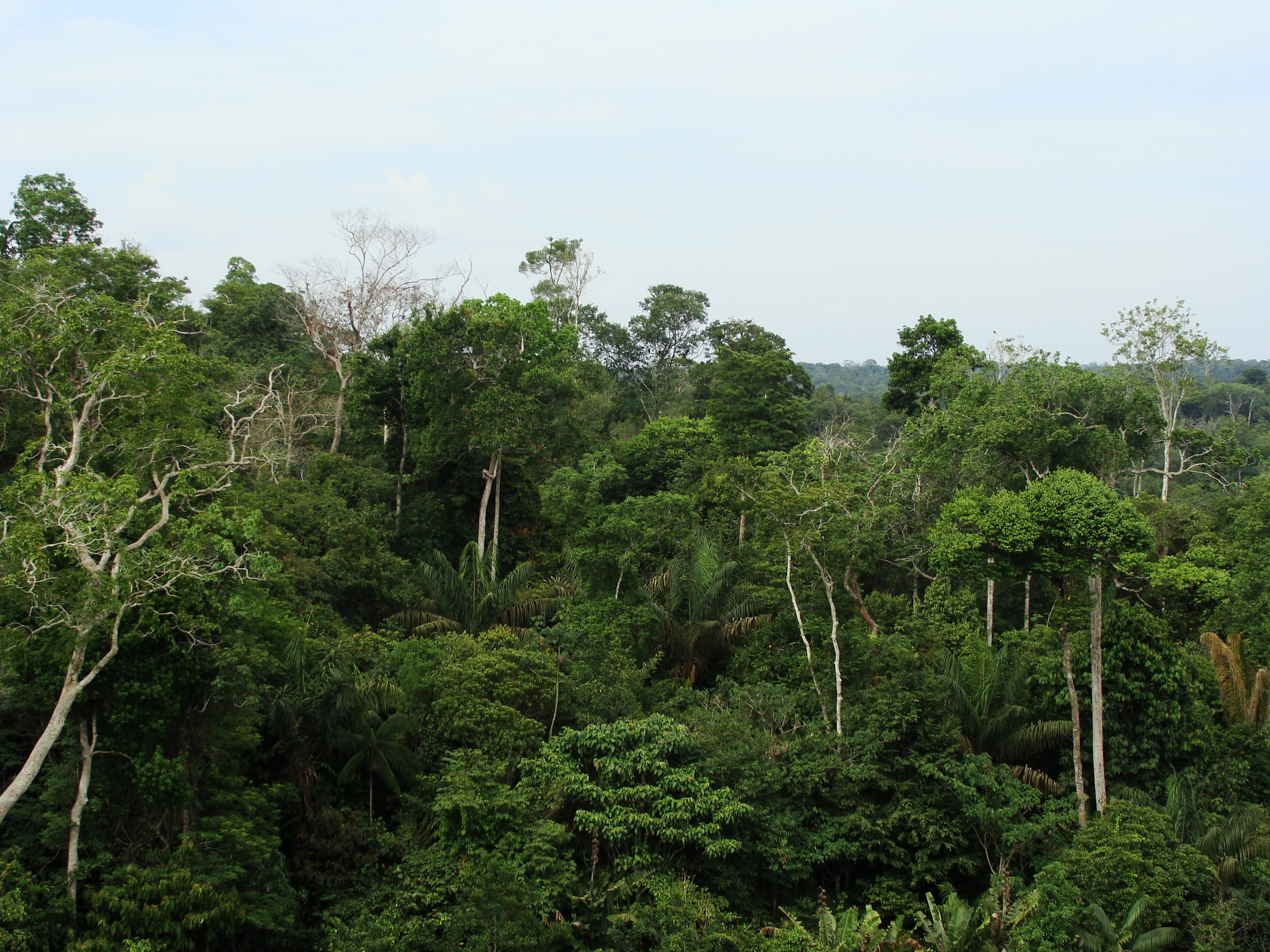
Tropical Wet Forest canopy

The Tropical Wet Forests are a Level I ecoregion of North America designated by the Commission for Environmental Cooperation (CEC) in its North American Environmental Atlas. As the CEC consists only of Mexico, the United States, and Canada, the defined ecoregion does not extend outside these countries to Central America nor the Caribbean.

The Tropical Wet Forests ecoregion in North America includes the southern tip of the Florida Peninsula in the United States; within Mexico, the Gulf Coastal Plain, the western and southern part of the Pacific Coastal Plain, most of the Yucatán Peninsula and the lowlands of the Chiapas Sierra Madre, which continue south to Central and South America. The region has some overlap with the tropical and subtropical moist broadleaf forests ecoregion defined by the World Wide Fund for Nature.

== Climate ==
The tropical wet forests of North America have an average year-round temperature between 68 and 78.8 °F (26.0 °C). Thus, frost does not occur under these conditions. The temperatures remain fairly uniform throughout the year; therefore there is not a change of seasons. There is also no dry season, as all months experience precipitation. The average annual precipitation ranges from eight to fourteen feet per year. The high levels of precipitation usually cause poor soil quality because soluble nutrients are lost due to the nutrient-leaching process. The average humidity is between 77 and 88%. Nine out of twelve months of the year are considered "wet" months. The overall climate of the tropical wet forests ecoregion can best be described as humid, warm, and wet. George Hadley, a scientist who researched during the 18th century suggested that warm tropical air rises and moves north. Colder high latitude air flows south nearer to the Earth's surface where it displaces the former air. Hadley's explanation is highly accepted and still expanded upon today. The warm, moist air in tropical wet forests is unstable; meaning as soon as the air rises it becomes saturated. In addition, there are large amounts of heat, or convection occurring at the same time. The vast bulk of vertical movement of air occurs in the Hadley cell and thus provides an explanation for the global circulation patterns.

The direction of the wind at various levels of the atmosphere determines local climate and can result in severe weather patterns. For example, in an El Nino winter, the presence of warm water in the eastern Pacific Ocean can shift the position of a subtropical jet stream. This results in heavy rainfall in the tropical wet forest ecoregion. Also, in a warming climate, the Hadley cell could increase the severity of the climate. As a result, the ecoregion may become hotter and wetter for longer periods of time.

== Hydrology ==
Hydrology in Tropical Wet Rainforests keeps the flow of water throughout the ecosystem, which nourishes plants, keeps local aquifers and rivers active, and the environment in the area functioning. The watershed and basin pattern has three major contexts; first, low-gradient drainage, second, typically high ground water table, and third, extensive drainage canal network. This idea applies to all areas but has unique outcomes in Tropical Wet Rain Forests in North America specifically. Tropical Wet Rainforests have an excess of vegetation, compared to many other ecoregion types such as savannahs, and therefore have a much slower drainage rate than other ecosystems. When an ecosystem has a high ground water table it separates the time between drainage and absorption of water in an area. It helps organisms to absorb nutrients, while also slowly filling up aquifers in the ecosystem. So primarily the downtime between rainfall and drainage is slowed due to vegetation and climate, but now due to the vastness of the ecosystem, the drainage canal network is large and water can fall in one place, and end up in many other places at the end of the draining process.

== Geology, topography, and soil ==
Wet tropical forests in North America span from sea level to an altitude of 1,000 metres (3,300 ft). They have particular geologic, topographic, and soil conditions that characterize them. These characteristics influence biotic structures and relationships and have contributed to the high biodiversity of the ecoregion.

The geology of these forests is primarily composed of folded and metamorphic hills, which are covered by a thin layer of alluvium (loose sediments and soil). The bedrock is sedimentary and rich in silica and dates back to the Precenozoic periods when much of the region was underwater.

The topography of wet tropical forests includes valleys, hills, ridges, and low mountains. Depending on elevation and the location of such features, areas as referred to as either lowland or highland. These elevation and topographical changes allow for a higher variety of specialized conditions, which increases habitat. The inclination changes (or slope) of the forest floor greatly affect water drainage and the leaching of nutrients, and valleys can have an accumulation of sediments and nutrients versus plateaus and ridges. But the most important topographic characteristic is the extensive network of rivers that weave across the landscape, acting as a drainage system to the forest that can receive upwards of 250 inches of rain a year.

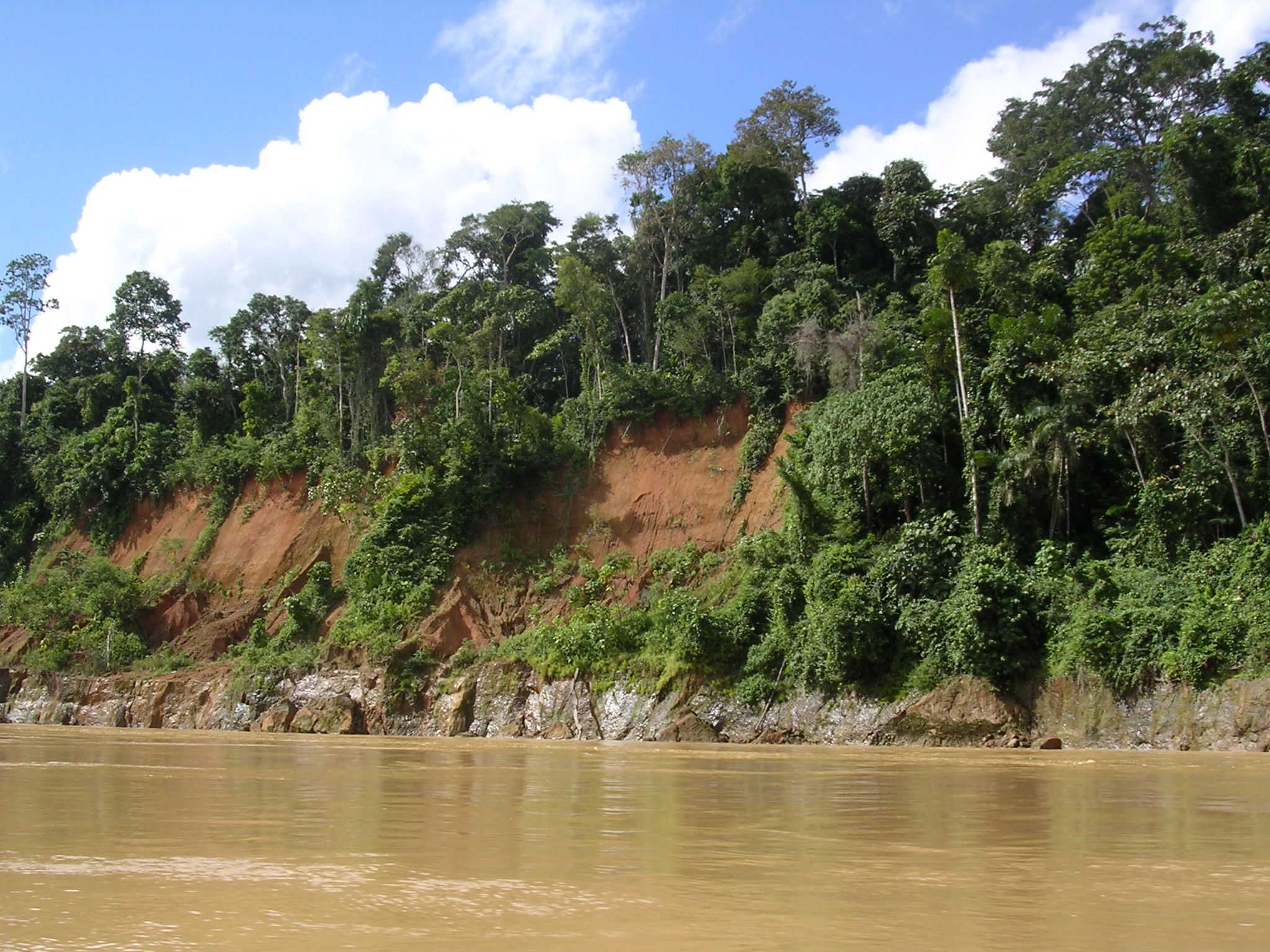
Tropical Forest river

The soils in wet tropical forests are some of the most diverse of any region, and they are the cause for many biological adaptations. There is a combination of highly weathered and leached soils as well as less weathered alluvial soils, categorized as "oxisols" and "ultisols". Their pH can vary immensely, sometimes being as acidic as 4.0. The soils are generally shallow, often only a few inches deep.

The soil is produced from decomposing organic matter and the breakdown of bedrock, but is generally poor in nutrients; most nutrients are found as superficial detritus and within the living components of the ecosystem. There are multiple reasons why the soil is generally very poor in nutrients. Firstly, the warm and humid climate allows for a rapid decomposition rate, meaning that nutrients do not stay present in or on top of the soil for long before being absorbed by the biota. Secondly, the acidity of the soil, caused by the few cation exchange sites to be occupied by hydrogen ions, increases the loss of minerals such as iron, aluminum oxides, and phosphorus. Thirdly, leaching, which is the continuous downward movement and loss of solutes and minerals from the soil, happens regularly due to heavy rainfall. An observer would not be able to tell that the soil is poor from the lush, dense vegetation in these wet tropical forests; but shortly after an area of forest is cleared for agriculture (usually through slash-and-burn) the small number of nutrients wash away and the soil becomes infertile.

The ecosystems have developed highly specialized ways of mitigating effects such as leaching, but these functions are fragile and need to be protected. This includes tree adaptations such as buttress roots and thick root mats that grow laterally along the forest floor. These adaptations mitigate nutrient loss by capturing the nutrients in falling detritus before the nutrients are absorbed and decomposed into the soil, and lost from leaching by the heavy rains. The geologic, topographic and soil changes across wet tropical forest ecosystems have contributed to the astonishing biodiversity in biota we see today.

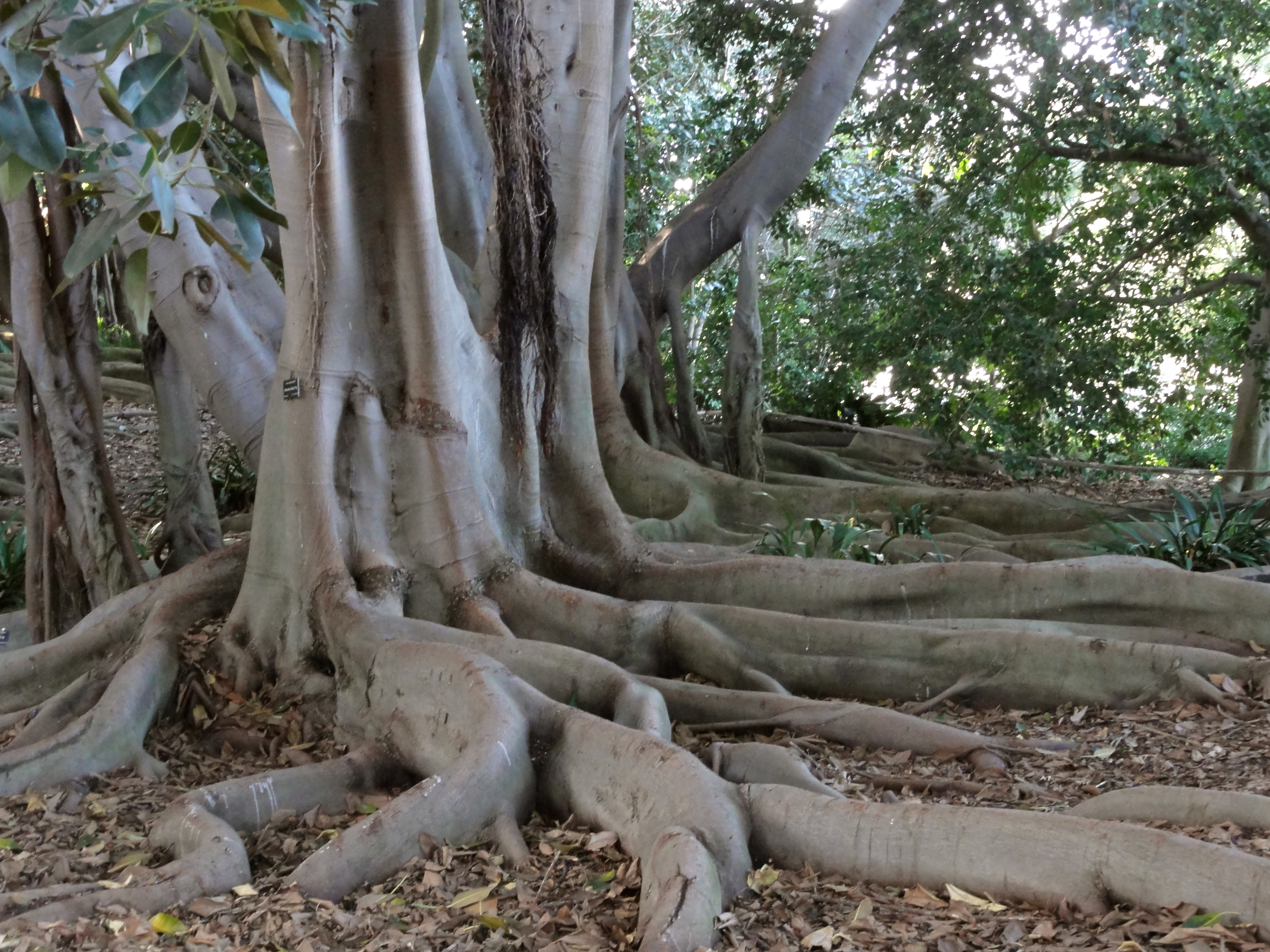
Buttress roots

== Flora and fauna ==
=== Plant communities ===
The plant communities of the tropical wet forest are the most diverse, abundant, and lush plant life in the world. The plants define the tropical wet forest by contributing to ecosystem functions, such as producing nourished rainfall and storing atmospheric carbon. Tropical wet forests are characterized by the complex, physical structure of the ecosystem. There are many layers of plant communities, though they are rarely visible from the ground. Shrubs and creepers fill the forest floor with saplings dispersed throughout. Large trees hold their full crowns in the canopy, prohibiting sunlight from plants below. Beneath the canopy of trees lies a network of stout branches, thick limbs, and climbers. Sometimes even above these trees, the largest of canopies fill the sky like individual islands.

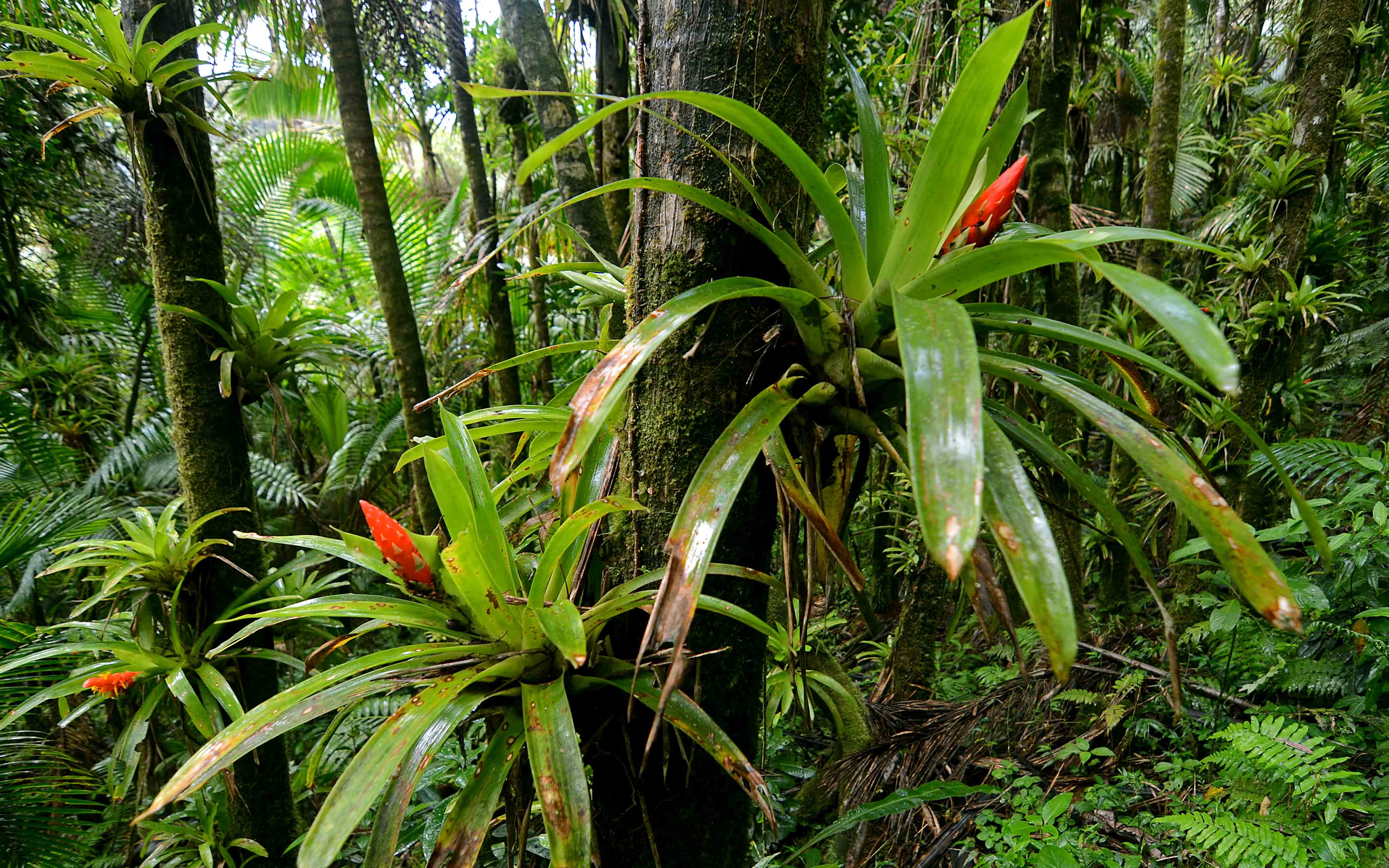

Large trees, such as the pacque, allspice, and breadnut tree, provide habitat for most animal species and other plant species. The leaves are usually oval, thick, and waxy with pointed drip tips to alleviate water collection. Roots are often buttressed (flaring from the above ground), radiated across the forest floor, or stilted as prop roots. Lichens, orchids, and mosses cover the trunks of trees, retaining moisture and hosting small invertebrates. Most tropical trees have large, colorful, fragrant blossoms and plump fruits, perfect feeding for animals and insects. Climbers, hemiepiphytes, and epiphytes are the major groups of non-tree species, although they tend to inhabit trees. Climbers provide a road system in canopies for motile animals. Vines are large in biomass and are an essential food source for many faunas. Hemiepiphytes have the most unusual growth forms and are parasitic to larger trees. Epiphytes claim space on a branch and set roots, trap minimal soil, and photosynthesize. They adhere tightly to the bark of trees but, are not internally parasitic. As rainforests become drier and more disturbed, these native species become rare. The loss of these plant communities severely affects the world, in regard to the increase of carbon dioxide, high floods, and impure water.

=== Key animal species ===
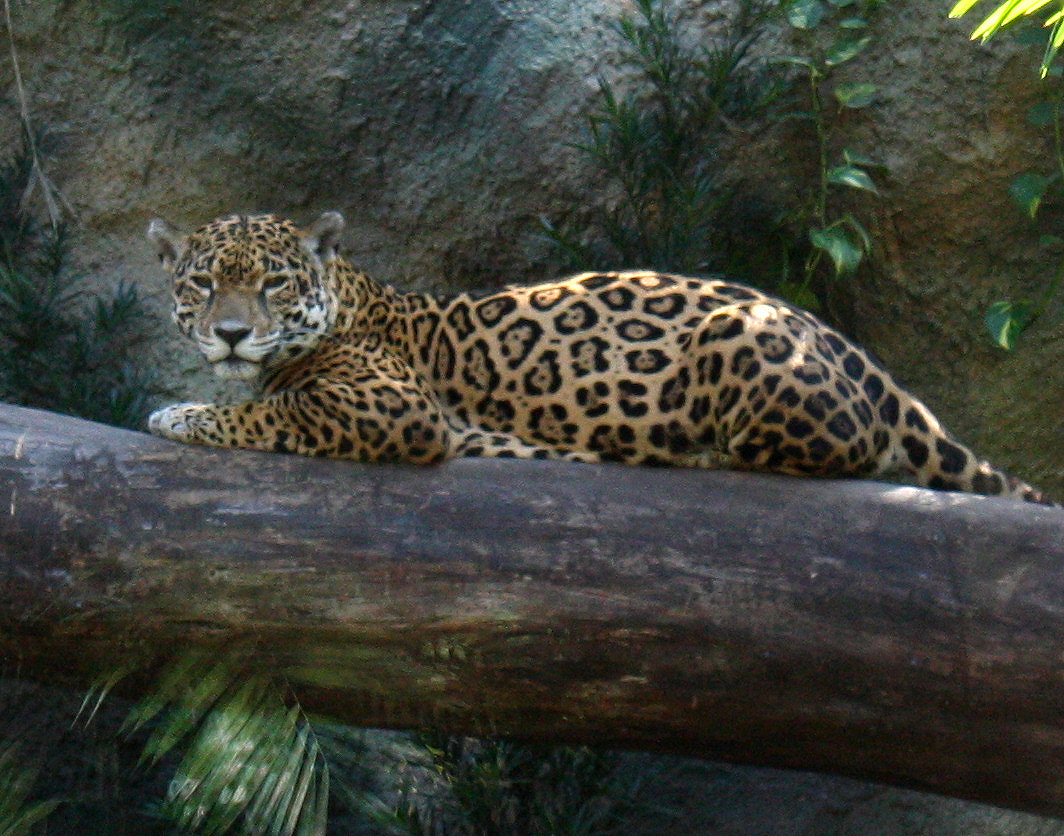
Jaguar-Biouniverzoo

The two main keystone species of the Tropical Wet Forest ecoregion are the American crocodile and the Mexican jaguar. They are both top predators and influence the population of their prey. American crocodiles create habitat for many creatures through their water holes and the paths they create. Their diet consists of fish, snails, birds, frogs, and mammals that come to the water's edge. Males can grow up to 15 feet long and weigh up to 2,000 pounds while females range from 8–13 feet. Their average life span is around 45 years. Females lay a clutch of between 20 and 60 eggs which hatch after an average of 85 days. The mother leaves the young to fend for themselves after a few days. The jaguar is the third largest cat in the world and the largest in North America. It is between 5 and 8 feet, nose to tail, and weighs between 140 and 300 pounds. Their average lifespan in the wild is 12–16 years while in captivity it ranges from 20 to 27 years. They have been observed to prey on around 85 different species, the most common of which are terrestrial mammals, they prefer giant anteaters, capybaras. Females become sexually mature around 2–3 years while males become sexually mature around 3–4 years. They have a gestation period of about 100 days and give birth to an average litter of 2 cubs. The cubs are able to open their eyes after about 8 days and are able to walk 10 days after that. They stay with their mother for a year and a half.

=== Endangered species, threats, and conservation ===
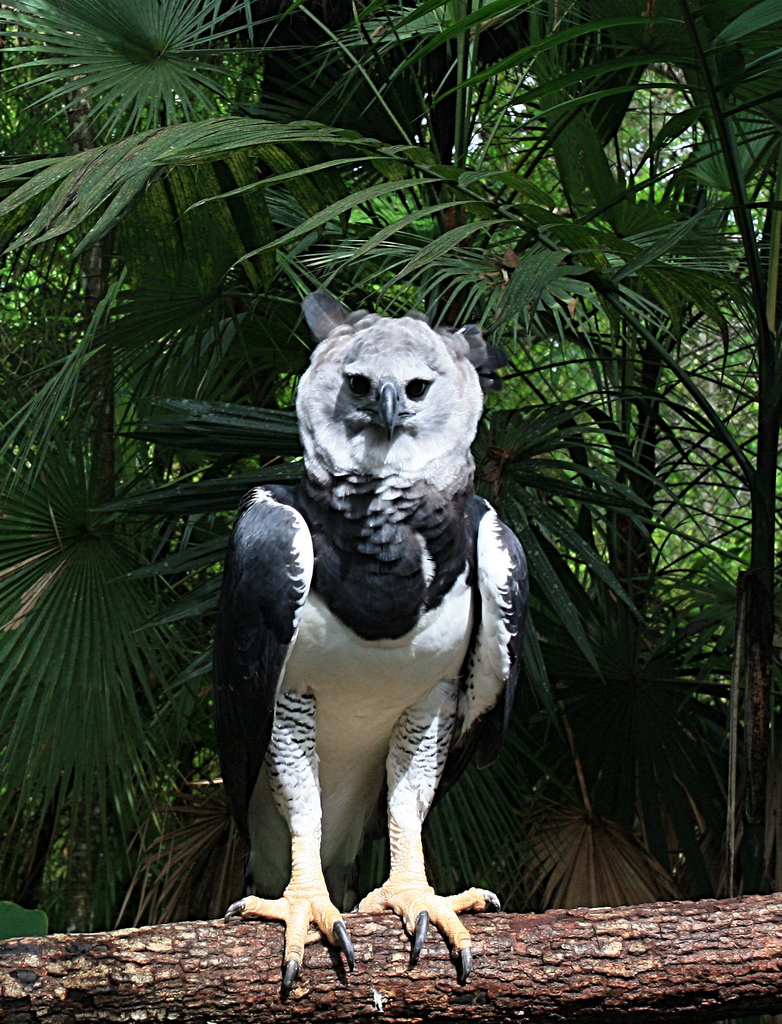
Harpy eagle

The IUCN Red List has 65,521 species listed as threatened in tropical wet forests. Harpia harpyja, the harpy eagle is one threatened species in the tropical wet forests, they are the largest neotropical bird of prey, nest in the tallest trees, prey mostly on animals that live in trees, lay between 1−2 eggs but only allowing 1 egg to hatch, reproduce every 2–4 years, and reaches sexual maturity between the ages of 4 and 5. The harpy eagle is suffering because of slow reproductive rates, hunting, food competition, fragmentation, and habitat destruction. There are many orchid species that are threatened in tropical wet forests. Orchids are a smart plants that manipulates other species into pollinating them, and once pollinated they produce seeds that are eventually released in hopes to be carried to a specific type of fungi (depending on the orchid) where it will attach for mycorrhizal symbioses, and then bloom after a few years or decades depending on the environment and species. Many orchid species are suffering because of overharvesting, burning, clearing, and development. Many efforts are being done to help save both species. Spreading knowledge (educating), creating reserves, and coming up with alternatives are the top three actions being done to conserve both species.

== Natural resources ==
Tropical wet forests are known for their wide diversity of natural resources. Historically, the primary harvestable products they produce are from plants including exotic lumber such as mahogany, red cedar, and also gum tree for rubber. Other plants that can be used from this region include common food items such as bananas, cacao, oranges, coffee, sesame, alfalfa, cotton, and a variety of peppers.

Following Spanish and English colonization of the area, there was a shift towards larger scaled agriculture plantations. With these plantations came increased production of sugar cane, beans, pineapples, and chiles as well as an increase in harvesting of precious lumber. This trend continued largely up into the 1960s when large swaths of land were cleared to make room for cattle ranches.

Consecutively came the influx from the petrochemical industry to extract the vast reservoirs of oil that exist underground. This new development led to even larger portions of land being cleared for oil drilling sites and roads compounding the existing problem of deforestation in the region.

One ray of hope for the future of natural resource procurement in tropical wet forests is the search for medicinally valuable plant secondary compounds. Plants that contain compounds that can treat ailments ranging from analgesics, antibiotics, heart drugs, enzymes, hormones, diuretics, anti-parasitics, dentifrices, laxatives, dysentery treatments, anti-coagulants, and hundreds more exist and could prove to be valuable economically viable as well as a sustainable alternative to current resources being used in the area.

== Environmental threats ==
Deforestation is the main threat to the North American tropical wet forests and has devastating consequences. Deforestation causes habitat loss and habitat fragmentation which has drastic effects on biodiversity. Deforestation of tropical wet forests has caused many native species to become endangered or extinct at an alarming rate. The Tropical Wet Forests around the globe are being deforested at an alarming rate. For example, some counties like Florida have lost 50% of their tropical wet forest habitat, and Costa Rica has lost about 90%.

Protection of the tropical wet forests we have left is very important for their continued existence. Many Reserves have been created in an attempt to protect the little we have left of these forests. Some examples of this in the United States are Florida's Everglades National Park and the Big Cypress National Preserve.

Another important tool for the continued existence of tropical wet forests is Restoration. There have been successful restoration projects of a tropical wet forest with native species in Costa Rica. These restoration projects have been shown to significantly improve native animal and plant species' survival. It is necessary for good management plans to be developed if we are to use tropical wet forests sustainably.

=== Effects of climate change ===
Over the last 100 years, the Earth's temperature has increased by 0.6 degrees Celsius and it is predicted to increase an additional 3.5 degrees over the next century. Tropical wet forests account for only 6% of Earth's land surface yet are responsible for 40% of earth's oxygen production. Any type of change to this system can prove to have significant detrimental effects in terms of global oxygen availability. In addition, due to the sensitivity and fragile interactions between organisms and the atmosphere, ecosystem services such as carbon sequestration rates, will experience even larger adverse effects.

Amounts of precipitation and moisture availability are also areas of concern. Global precipitation is expected to rise two-fold in tropical areas. This will cause shifts in vegetation as moist forest species expand into new areas of moisture. Increasing atmospheric emissions also play an integral role in precipitation patterns. Annual rainfall is projected to decrease across the Everglades National Park causing a hydrologic change across the entire region. Dry vegetative communities will outnumber hydric vegetative communities in this particular area.

Furthermore, a one-degree increase in atmospheric temperature is the result of a doubling of atmospheric CO_{2}. Effects of this increase on forest soil temperature include reduced tree growth and higher decomposition rates of deep soil organic matter. Ultimately, as the forests become a larger carbon source to the atmosphere, ecosystem services cease to function, and the delicate balance found in the tropics is disrupted, the climate warming cycle intensifies.

=== The iconic ecosystems of the region ===
An iconic ecosystem of this region is the complex interaction and the variety of biota along with fairly consistent abiotic factors; even though this ecoregion covers roughly seven percent of the earth's surface, its tree community is the most diverse on the planet. It would not be unusual to have 100 different tree species coexisting within a one-hectare plot. The tree community contains many broad-leafed evergreen trees, which form a high canopy (30–40 meters) above the ground. The understory contains a variety of more shade tolerant plants, which is a necessity for survival due to the thick canopy above. The vegetation is "spatially heterogeneous". This plant community survives in nutrient-poor soils conditions making disturbances (such as deforestation) to have greater effects because regeneration of the forest takes much longer. Tributaries and river systems have formed from a large amount of rainfall and typically carry a lot of sediments, but increased water demands and the construction of dams can further alter and strain these ecosystems.

== Subregions ==
- Humid Gulf of Mexico Coastal Hills (ecoregion)
- Humid Gulf of Mexico Coastal Plain (ecoregion)

=== Plain and Hills of the Yucatan Peninsula ===
- Yucatan Peninsula Hills (ecoregion)
- Yucatan Peninsula Plain/Deciduous Tropical Forest (ecoregion)
- Yucatan Peninsula Plain/Semi-Evergreen Tropical Forest (ecoregion)

=== Sierra Los Tuxtlas ===
- Los Tuxtlas Sierra

=== Everglades ===
- Southern Florida Coastal Plain (ecoregion)

=== Western Pacific Plain and Hills ===
- Jalisco/Nayarit Hills and Plains (ecoregion)
- Nayarit and Sinaloa Plain (ecoregion)

=== Coastal Plain and Hills of Soconusco ===
- Coastal Plain and Hills of Soconusco (ecoregion)
