= Taiga of North America =

Ecoregion in North America

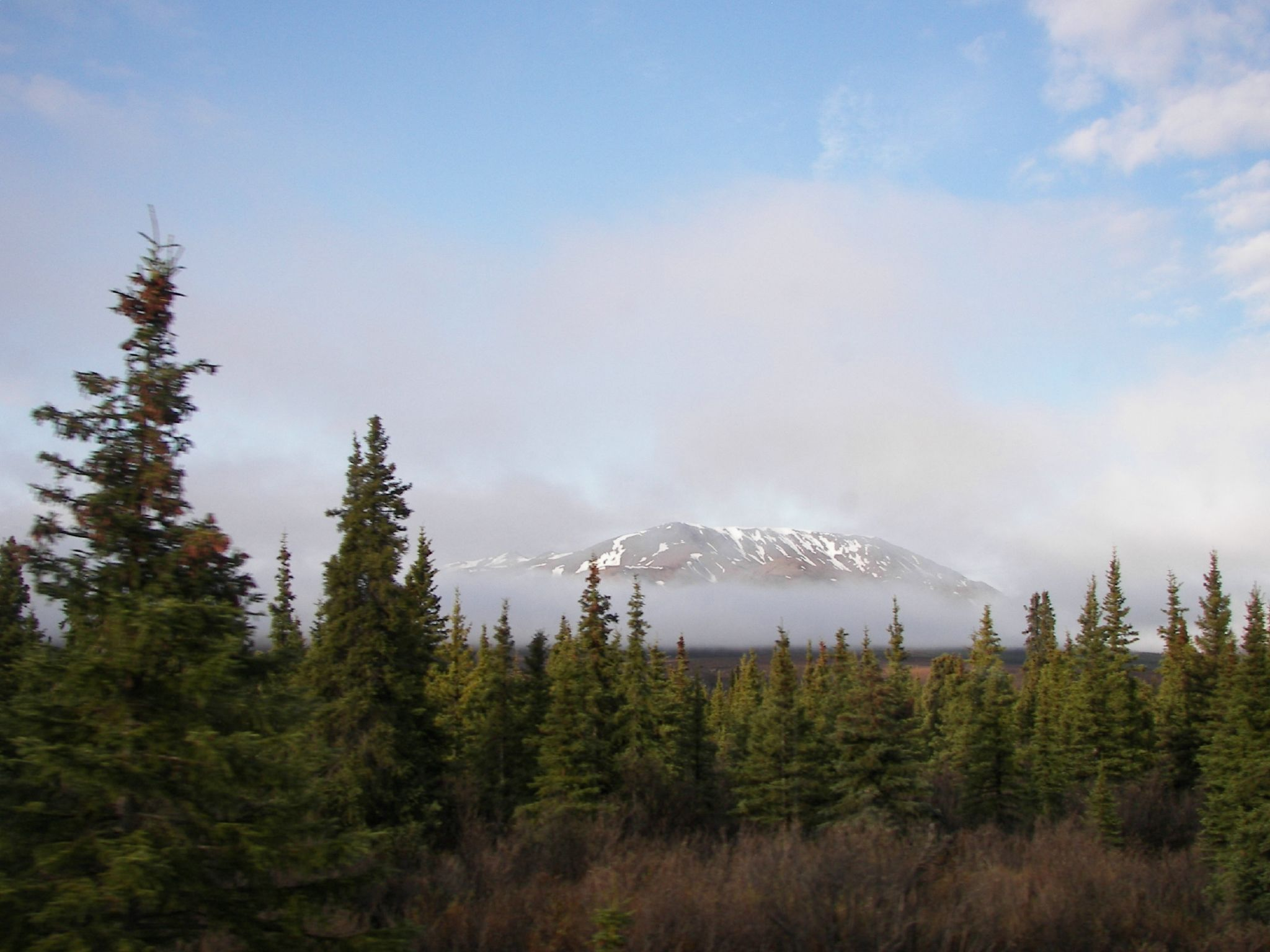
Taiga in Alaska

The Taiga of North America is a Level I ecoregion of North America designated by the Commission for Environmental Cooperation (CEC) in its North American Environmental Atlas.

The taiga ecoregion includes much of interior Alaska as well as the Yukon forested area, and extends on the west from the Bering Sea to the Richardson Mountains in on the east, with the Brooks Range on the north and the Alaska Range on the south end. It is a region with a vast mosaic of habitats and a fragile yet extensive patchwork of ecological characteristics. All aspects of the region such as soils and plant species, hydrology, and climate interaction, and are affected by climate change, new emerging natural resources, and other environmental threats such as deforestation. These threats alter the biotic and abiotic components of the region, which lead to further degradation and to various endangered species.

== Flora, fauna, and soil ==
=== Soils and plant species ===
The main type of soil in the taiga is Spodosol. These soils contain a Spodic horizon, a sandy layer of soil that has high accumulations of iron and aluminum oxides, which lays underneath a leached A horizon. The color contrast between the Spodic horizon and the overlying horizon is very easy to identify. The color change is the result of the migration of iron and aluminum oxides from small, but consistent amounts of rainfall from the top horizon to the lower horizon of the soil.

The decomposition of organic matter is very slow in the taiga because of the cold climate and low moisture. With the slow decomposition of organic matter, nutrient cycling is very slow and the nutrient level of the soil is also very low. The soils in the taiga are quite acidic as well. A relatively small amount of rainfall coupled with the slow decomposition of organic material allows the acidic plant debris to sit and saturate the top horizons of the soil profile.

As a result of the infertile soil, only a few plant species can really thrive in the taiga. The common plant species in the taiga are coniferous trees. Not only do conifer trees thrive in acidic soils, they actually make the soil more acidic. Acidic leaflitter (or needles) from conifers falls to the forest floor and the precipitation leaches the acids down into the soil. Other species that can tolerate the acidic soils of the taiga are lichens and mosses, yellow nutsedge, and water horsetail. The depth to bedrock has an effect on the plants that grow well in the taiga as well. A shallow depth to bedrock forces the plants to have shallow roots, limiting overall stability and water uptake.

=== Keystone species ===
Beaver, Canadian lynx, bobcat, wolverine, and snowshoe hare are all keystone species in the taiga area. These species are keystone because they have learned to adapt to the cold climate of the area and are able to survive year-round.

These species survive year-round in taiga by changing fur color and growing extra fur. They have adapted to use each other to survive too. All of the predators depend on the snowshoe hare at some point during the year. All of the species also depend on forests in the area for shelter.

=== Endangered species ===
The taiga is inhabited by many species, some of which are endangered, and include the Canadian lynx, gray wolf, and grizzly bear. The Canadian lynx is one well-known animal to inhabit the North American taiga region and is listed as threatened in the U.S. The mother lynx will have a litter of about 4 kittens in the spring. Following the birth, the female is the sole caretaker, nursing them for about 5 months and teaching them to hunt. They will stay with her until the next breeding season. According to the USDS Forest Service, protection for the lynx has increased since 2000, which marks the date it became protected under the Endangered Species Act. Since much of the lynx's habitat is land managed by the agency, efforts to maintain and increase the habitat for the Canadian lynx using forest management plans are underway.

The taiga region is also interspersed with various plant species. The endangered or threatened species include Labrador tea, lady's slipper orchid, helleborine orchid, longleaf pine, lingonberry plant, Newfoundland pine marten, Methuselahs beard, lodgepole pine, and Scots pine. The life history of longleaf pine is a tree species that has been around for quite some time and can reach more than 250 years in age. To begin the tree's life, a seed falls from the parent in October to late November awaiting water to begin germination in a few weeks. Those individuals that make it, will enter what is known as the grass stage. During this stage, the roots are established, and the bud of the tree is protected from fire. Years later, the longleaf will reach about 6–10 feet (1.8–3.0 m) in height and the diameter will increase with time. Somewhere around 30 years after the trees will begin to produce cones with fertile seeds and average about 110 feet (34 m) at maturity. One recent study discusses the effects of logging in the 1950s on pine species. Since then, conservation efforts have increased the number of pine (and other) tree species. The Nature Conservancy is prioritizing its protection efforts to rebuild long-leaf pine forests through land purchases, conservation easements, and management of land sites. Restoration is also a large part of efforts to ensure the long-leaf pine remains extant. By planting seedlings, controlling competitive vegetation, and controlling burning methods, scientists and volunteers are working to increase the number of long-leaf pine.

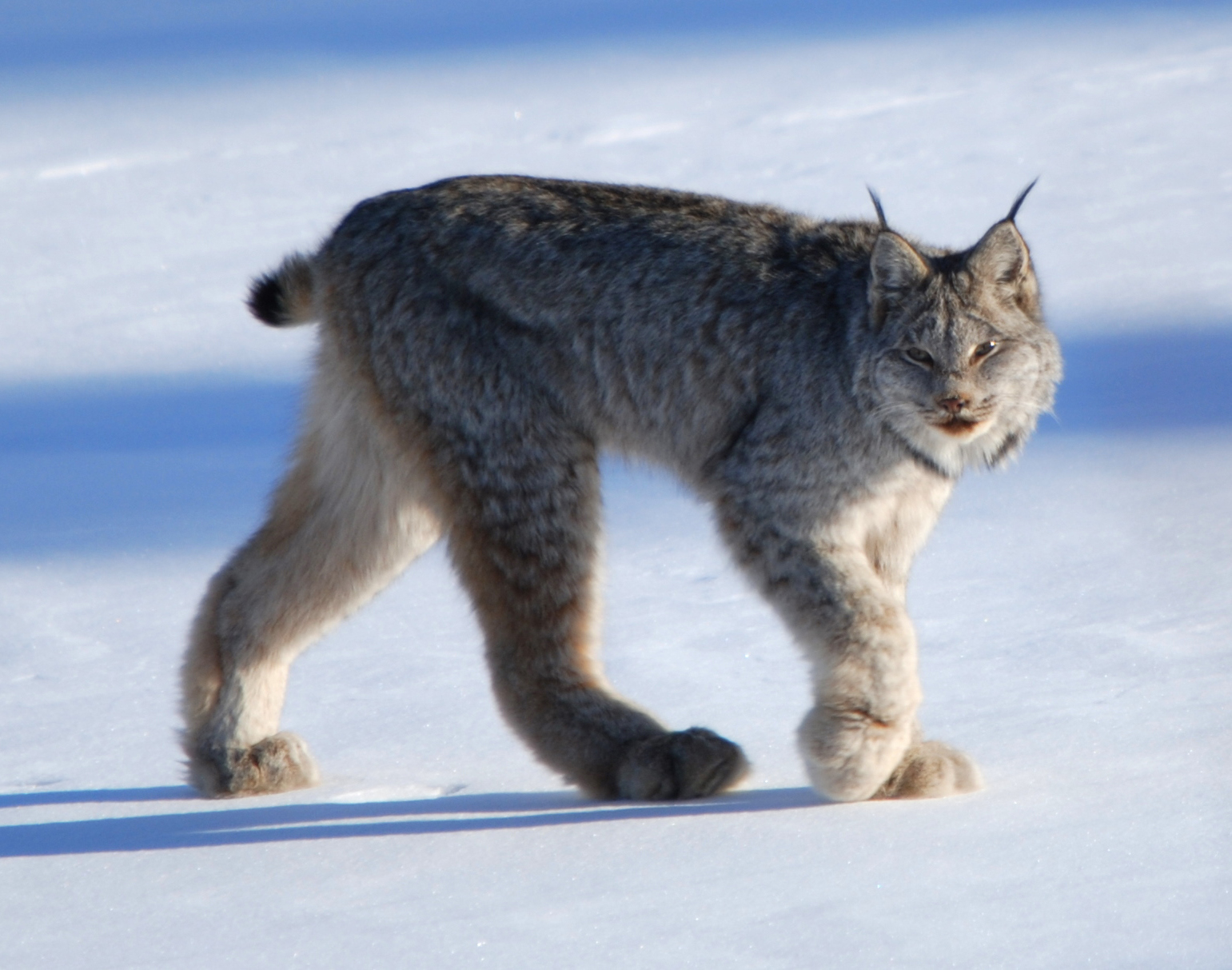
Canadian lynx near Whitehorse, Yukon

== Hydrology ==
Watersheds characterize much of the taiga ecoregion as interconnecting rivers, streams, lakes, and coastlines. Due to a cool climate, low evaporation levels keep moisture levels high and enable water to have serious influences on ecosystems. The vast majority of water in the taiga is freshwater, occupying lakes and rivers.

Many watersheds are dominated by large rivers that dump huge amounts of freshwater into the ocean such as the Lena river in Central Siberia. This exportation of freshwater helps control the thermohaline circulation and the global climate. Flow rates of taiga rivers are variable and "flashy" due to the presence of permafrost that keeps water from percolating deep into the soil. Due to global warming, flow rates have increased as more of the permafrost melts every year. In addition to "flashy" flow levels, the permafrost in the taiga allows dissolved inorganic nitrogen and organic carbon levels in the water to be higher while calcium, magnesium, sulfate, and hydrogen bicarbonate levels are shown to be much lower. As a dominant characteristic in the soil, permafrost also influences the degree to which water percolates into the soil. Where there is year-long permafrost, the water table is located much deeper in the soil and is less available to organisms, while discontinuous permafrost provides much shallower access.

Lakes that cover the taiga are characteristically formed by receding glaciers and therefore have many unique features. The vast majority of lakes and ponds in the taiga ecoregion are oligotrophic and have much higher levels of allochthonous versus autochthonous matter. This is due to glacier formation and has implications for how trophic levels interact with limiting nutrients. These oligotrophic lakes show organic nitrogen and carbon as more limiting nutrients for trophic growth over phosphorus. This contrasts sharply with mesotrophic or eutrophic lakes from similar climates.

== Climate ==
When we look at the climate of the taiga, we are looking at average temperatures, abiotic factors such as precipitation, and circulatory patterns. According to the study in Global Change Biology, the average yearly temperatures across the Alaskan and Canadian taiga ranged from −26.6 °C to 4.8 °C. This indicates the extremely cold weather the taiga has for the majority of the year. As for precipitation, the majority of it is snow, but rain is also an important factor. According to The International Journal of Climatology, precipitation in the form of rain ranged from 40 mm average in August, to 15 mm average in April over a multi-year study. Rain is not the only kind of precipitation that affects the taiga; the main factor in precipitation is usually snow. According to CEC Ecological Regions of North America, snow and freshwater ice can occupy the taiga for half to three-quarters of the year. A CEC Ecological Regions of North America document states that the lowest average precipitation is on the western side of taiga; can be as little as 200 mm and on the east coast it can be as high as exceeding 1,000 mm. As for circulatory patterns, we're finding that the temperature increases have led to a season shift. Global Change Biology also has noted with the change in temperature over time, as well as the overall climate change, the growing season has lengthened. Their findings illustrate that the growing season has grown 2.66 days per ten years. This growing season change as a result of global warming is having an extreme effect on the taiga.

== Environmental threats ==
Climate change has played its role in threatening the taiga ecoregion. Equally as harmful are the human effects like deforestation, however, many associations and regulations are working to protect the taiga and reverse the damage. Climate change is resulting in rising temperatures and decreases in moisture, which causes parasites and other insects to be more active thus causing tree stress and death. Thawing permafrost has led to many forests experiencing less stability and they become "drunken forests" (the decrease in soil stability causes the trees to lean or fall over). Increased tree death then leads to a carbon dioxide outflux, thus further propagating the increases in global warming. It is essential for climate change to be combated with global action, which is what the Kyoto Protocol in 1997 was created to do. Other measures to protect the taiga would be to prohibit unsustainable deforestation, switch to renewable energy, and protect old-growth forests, (they sequester the most carbon dioxide). The taiga also suffers from more direct human effects such as logging and mining sites. Logging has been a very profitable business in the region, however, fragmentation of forests leads to loss of habitats, relocation of keystone species, increases in erosion, increases in magnitude and frequency of flooding, and altered soil composition. Regions in which permafrost has thawed and trees have fallen take centuries to recover. Canadian and Russian governments enacted a Protection Belt, which covers 21.1 million ha, and initiatives like the Far East Association for the use of non-timber forest products, give economic significance to the forests while avoiding logging. In addition to logging, studies have measured over 99,300 tones of airborne pollutants from just one metal-extracting plant over a 50-year span. These pollutants are 90% sulfur dioxide, which is a precursor to acid rain. Other emissions include nitrogen oxides, sulfurous anhydrides, and inorganic dust. Forests in a 50 kilometres (31 mi) radius of these sites can serve little to no biological services once affected, and there has been the little appearance of protection measures to regulate mining plants.

=== Effects of climate change ===
Over the next 100 years, global annual mean temperatures are expected to rise by 1.4−5.8 °C, but changes in high latitudes where the boreal biome exists will be much more extreme (perhaps as much as a 10 °C rise). The warming observed at high latitudes over the past 50 years exceeds the global average by as much as a factor of 5 (2–3 °C in Alaska versus the 0.53° global mean).

The effects of increased temperature on boreal forest growth have varied, often depending on tree species, site type, and region, as well as whether or not the warming is accompanied by increases or decreases in precipitation. However, studies of tree rings from all parts of the boreal zone have indicated an inverse growth response to temperature, likely as a result of direct temperature and drought stress. As global warming increases, negative effects on growth are likely to become more widespread as ecosystems and species will be unable to adapt to increasingly extreme environmental conditions.

Perhaps the most significant effect of climate change on the boreal region is the increase in the severity of disturbance regimes, particularly fire and insect outbreaks. Fire is the dominant type of disturbance in boreal North America, but the past 30-plus years have seen a gradual increase in fire frequency and severity as a result of warmer and drier conditions. From the 1960s to the 1990s, the annual area burned increased from an average of 1.4 to 3.1 million hectares per year. Insect outbreaks also represent an increasingly significant threat. Historically, temperatures have been low enough in the wintertime to control insect populations, but under global warming, many insects are surviving and reproducing during the winter months, causing severe damage to forests across the North American boreal. The main culprits are the mountain pine beetle in the western provinces of British Columbia and Alberta, and the spruce bark beetle in Alaska.

== Subregions ==
=== Alaska Boreal Interior ===
- Interior Bottomlands (ecoregion)
- Interior Forested Lowlands and Uplands (ecoregion)
- Yukon Flats (ecoregion)

=== Taiga Cordillera ===
- Mackenzie and Selwyn Mountains (ecoregion)
- Ogilvie Mountains (ecoregion)
- Peel River and Nahanni Plateaus (ecoregion)

=== Taiga Plain ===
- Great Bear Plains (ecoregion)
- Hay and Slave River Lowlands (ecoregion)

=== Taiga Shield ===
- Coppermine River and Tazin Lake Uplands (ecoregion)
- Kazan River and Selwyn Lake Uplands (ecoregion)
- La Grande Hills and New Quebec Central Plateau (ecoregion)
- Smallwood Uplands (ecoregion)
- Ungava Bay Basin and George Plateau (ecoregion)
