= North American Agreement on Environmental Cooperation =

- Type: Side treaty to North American Free Trade Agreement
- Effective: January 1, 1994
- Replaced by: Environmental Cooperation Agreement
- Signatories: Canada; Mexico; United States

Full text
- North American Agreement on Environmental Cooperation at Wikisource

The North American Agreement on Environmental Cooperation (NAAEC) was an environmental agreement between the United States of America, Canada and Mexico and a side-treaty of the North American Free Trade Agreement (NAFTA) that came into effect on January 1, 1994. In 2020, the agreement was succeeded by the Environmental Cooperation Agreement (ECA) alongside the succession of NAFTA by the United States–Mexico–Canada Agreement (USMCA).

The agreement consisted of a declaration of principles and objectives concerning conservation and the protection of the environment as well as concrete measures to further cooperation on these matters among the three countries. Part Three of the NAAEC established the Commission for Environmental Cooperation (CEC) as part of the agreement. The CEC is composed of the council, the governing body, a Secretariat based in Montreal and the Joint Public Advisory Committee.
