= North American Environmental Atlas =

Interactive mapping tool

The North American Environmental Atlas is an interactive mapping tool created through a partnership of government agencies in Canada, Mexico and the United States, along with the Commission for Environmental Cooperation, a trilateral international organization created under the North American Agreement on Environmental Cooperation (NAAEC). By "mapping North America's shared environment", the Atlas depicts environmental issues from a continental perspective.

== Purpose ==
The North American Environmental Atlas builds on information created, gathered, and harmonized by government scientists and cartographers from Natural Resources Canada, the United States Geological Survey, and Mexico's Instituto Nacional de Estadística y Geografía. Each country's contributing team works closely with their partner agencies in the other countries to ensure seamless and harmonized data.

The Atlas provides a foundation to analyze the status of environmental conditions and identify significant trends across North America. It contains data on watersheds, terrestrial and marine ecoregions and protected areas, industrial pollution, human impact, and base layers including transportation and waterways. The Commission for Environmental Cooperation uses these geospatial data to identify priority areas to conserve biodiversity, track cross-border pollution, monitor carbon emissions across major transportation routes, and predict the spread of invasive species.

== Map Information ==
Information included in the Atlas includes accurate, seamless maps, documentation, and geospatial data that crosses political borders. This data is displayed as series of interactive map layers in an easy-to-use map viewer format. Most layers in the North American Environmental Atlas are at a scale of 1:1:10,000,000 or finer.

The variety of layers in the Atlas continues to expand in order to support analysis of environmental conditions. Increasingly, data are being made compatible with tools such as Google Earth and ArcGis On-line/Arc Explorer. The entire collection of maps, data, and downloadable files is available online.
