= Commission for Environmental Cooperation =

Intergovernmental environmental organization

- Commission de coopération environnementale (French); Comisión para la Cooperación Ambiental (Spanish)
- Abbreviation: CEC; CCA; CCE
- Formation: 1994; 32 years ago
- Type: Intergovernmental organization
- Headquarters: 1001 Robert-Bourassa Boulevard, Suite 1620
- Location: Montreal, Quebec, Canada
- Coordinates: 45.5006°N 73.5674°W
- Region served: North America
- Fields: Environmental policy
- Members: 3 member states: Canada; Mexico; United States
- Official language: English, French, Spanish
- Executive Director: Jorge Daniel Taillant
- Main organ: Council
- Website: cec.org

The Commission for Environmental Cooperation (CEC; Spanish: Comisión para la Cooperación Ambiental; French: Commission de coopération environnementale) is an intergovernmental organization established by Canada, Mexico, and the United States to implement the North American Agreement on Environmental Cooperation (NAAEC), the environmental side accord to the North American Free Trade Agreement. The CEC's mission is to facilitate cooperation and public participation to foster conservation, protection and enhancement of the North American environment for the benefit of present and future generations, in the context of increasing economic, trade and social connections among Canada, Mexico and the United States.

In January 2026, United States President Donald Trump announced that the United States would withdraw from the CEC.

== Origins and structure ==
The Commission for Environmental Cooperation was created in 1994 by Canada, Mexico and the United States, under the NAAEC. The NAAEC was implemented in parallel to the NAFTA (North American Free Trade Agreement) and complements NAFTA's environmental provisions. It signified a commitment that liberalization of trade and economic growth in North America would be accompanied by collaboration and continuous improvement in the environmental protection provided by each of the three signatory countries. In part, the NAAEC was driven by the desire of the United States to mitigate public concern about the impact of trade liberalization on environmental protection in the three countries, particularly Mexico.

The CEC is the first international environmental organization created in parallel with a trade agreement and is the sole organization with a mandate to monitor and report upon the impact of trade on the environment of North America.

The CEC is composed of the Council, the Secretariat and the Joint Public Advisory Committee.

=== CEC Council ===
The Council is the CEC's governing body and is composed of the highest-level federal environmental authorities from Canada, Mexico, and the United States: the Canadian Minister of Environment and Climate Change, the Mexican Secretary of Environment and Natural Resources (Semarnat), and the Administrator of the US Environmental Protection Agency.

The Council meets at least once a year, including with the public, to set the CEC's overall direction, including its budget and activities. It assigns responsibilities, if needed, to committees, working groups or expert groups, as may be required to fulfill its mandate.

CEC Council Members
Country	Representative	Title
Canada	Julie Dabrusin	Minister of the Environment, Climate Change and Nature
Mexico	Alicia Bárcena	Ministry of Environment and Natural Resources
United States	Michael S. Regan	Administrator of the Environmental Protection Agency

=== Secretariat ===
The CEC Secretariat is headquartered in Montreal. The Secretariat implements several projects under the operational plan authorized by the Council and processes submissions on enforcement matters.

=== Joint Public Advisory Committee ===
The Joint Public Advisory Committee (JPAC) is composed of fifteen citizens (five from each country). JPAC advises the Council on any matter within the scope of the North American Agreement on Environmental Cooperation and serves as a source of information for the CEC Secretariat.

As a group of volunteer citizens, JPAC is a microcosm of the public: independent individuals who contribute diverse but rich institutional experience and cultural perspectives.

In addition, in 2015 the CEC established a Roster of Experts on Traditional Ecological Knowledge (TEK) whose mandate it is to identify opportunities to apply TEK to the CEC's operations and policy recommendations. This is an innovative mechanism and the first traditional ecological knowledge panel to be named to a trilateral organization such as the CEC. In July 2017, the group was re-christened the "TEK Expert Group" and now reports directly to the CEC Council.

== Cooperative Work Program ==
The CEC's cooperative agenda is defined through the Strategic Plan. The current CEC Strategic Plan 2015–2020 identifies three areas of priority action for the CEC: Climate Change Mitigation and Adaptation, Green Growth, and Sustainable Communities and Ecosystems.

Two-year Operational Plans present how the goals and objectives of the Strategic Plan will be implemented through project activities and key initiatives, and specify the budget for the Commission. Operational Plans are updated biennially.

=== North American Partnership for Environmental Community Action ===
In 2010, the CEC established a grant program, the North American Partnership for Environmental Community Action (NAPECA) to support communities in their efforts to address environmental problems locally. NAPECA is intended to support a flexible and diverse set of project types that will improve access to resources provided by the Parties through the CEC for smaller, more hands-on organizations and that build partnerships at the community level with a focus on sustainable communities and urban initiatives.

=== Tools and Resources ===
==== Publications ====
The CEC's online publications library provides the public with easy access to its large body of published work on environmental policy and research in North America.

==== Pollutant Release and Transfer Register ====
The North American PRTR Project involves the compilation and dissemination of information on the sources, amounts and handling of toxic substances released or transferred by over 35,000 industrial facilities in Canada, the United States, and Mexico, based on data reported to the pollutant release and transfer register (PRTR) of each country. The main products of this project are Taking Stock Online: a website featuring information and a searchable database of integrated, North American PRTR data and the annual Taking Stock report.

The Taking Stock Online tool allows the user to explore information on pollution from industrial facilities across North America. Summary charts and customized queries can be created and the analysis results downloaded in a variety of formats, including kml files for viewing through Google Earth.

==== North American Environmental Atlas ====
Created through the cooperation of three national agency partners, the North American Environmental Atlas combines harmonized data from Canada, Mexico and the United States to allow for a continental and regional perspective on environmental issues that cross boundaries. The Atlas continues to grow in breadth and depth as more thematic maps are created through the work of the Commission for Environmental Cooperation (CEC) and its partners. Scientists and map makers from Natural Resources Canada, the United States Geological Survey, Instituto Nacional de Estadística y Geografía, and other agencies in each country produced the information contained in the Atlas. The collection of viewable maps, data, and downloadable map files is available online without cost.

== Submissions on Enforcement Matters ==
Articles 14 and 15 of the NAAEC provide a mechanism whereby any nongovernmental organization or person residing or established in North America can file a submission asserting that a Party to the Agreement is failing to effectively enforce its environmental law. The process is informed by the Guidelines for Submissions on Enforcement Matters under Articles 14 and 15 of the NAAEC. The process may lead to the development and publication of a detailed report, called a factual record, researched and written by independent experts. Past submissions have resulted in improved environmental protection, law and policy changes, and increased budgets for enforcement.

Here is a list of factual records published since 1996:

Factual Records	Year
Alberta Tailings Ponds II	2020
Agricultural Waste Burning in Sonora	2018
Wetlands in Manzanillo	2016
Sumidero Canyon II	2015
Coal-fired Power Plants	2014
Ex Hacienda El Hospital II and III	2014
Environmental Pollution in Hermosillo II	2014
Lake Chapala II	2013
Quebec Automobiles	2012
Montreal Technoparc	2008
ALCA-Iztapalapa II	2008
Ontario Logging I and Ontario Logging II	2007
Pulp and Paper	2006
Tarahumara	2006
Molymex II	2004
Río Magdalena	2003
BC Mining	2003
Oldman River II	2003
BC Logging	2003
Aquanova	2003
Migratory Birds	2003
Metales y Derivados	2002
BC Hydro	2000
Cozumel	1998

== Independent Secretariat reports ==
Under NAAEC Article 13, the CEC Secretariat may develop independent reports on any matter within the scope of the annual program and present them to the three Parties and the general public. These reports may address issues that are not covered by biennial operational plans and have the potential to inform future work of the CEC. Since 1994, the CEC Secretariat has published the following reports:

Article 13 Reports	Year
Hazardous Trade? An Examination of US-generated Spent Lead-Acid Battery Exports and Secondary Lead Recycling in Canada, Mexico, and the United States	2013
Destination Sustainability: Reducing Greenhouse Gas Emissions from Freight Transportation in North America	2011
Green Building in North America	2008
Maize and Biodiversity: The Effects of Transgenic Maize in Mexico	2004
Environmental Challenges and Opportunities of the Evolving North American Electricity Market	2002
Ribbon of Life: An Agenda for Preserving Transboundary Migratory Bird Habitat on the Upper San Pedro River	1999
Continental Pollutant Pathways: An Agenda for Cooperation to Address Long-Range Transport of Air Pollution in North America	1997
The Death of Migratory Birds at the Silva Reservoir	1995

== See also ==
- International Joint Commission
