= Gertrude Hoffmann (actress) =

German-American character actress (1871–1968)

Gertrude W. Hoffmann
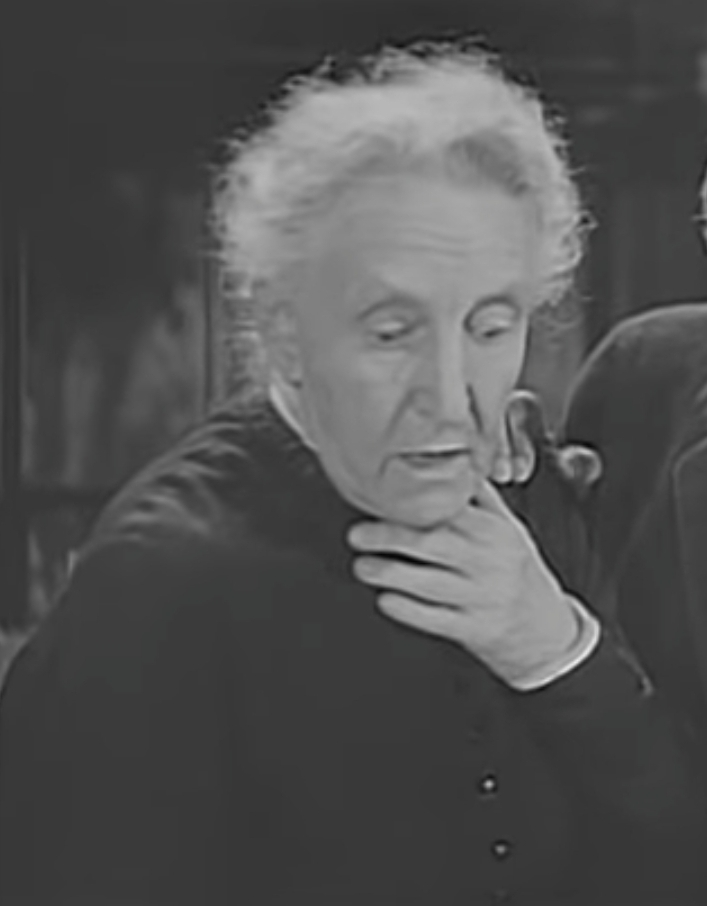
- Hoffmann in The Ape (1940)
- Born: Eliza Gertrude Wesselhoeft; May 17, 1871; Heidelberg, German Empire
- Died: February 13, 1968 (aged 96); Santa Barbara, California, U.S.
- Resting place: Grand View Memorial Park Cemetery, Glendale, California
- Occupation: Actress
- Years active: 1933–1963
- Spouse: Ralph Hoffmann (m. 1894; died 1932)
- Children: 3

Gertrude W. Hoffmann (born Eliza Gertrude Wesselhoeft; May 17, 1871 – February 13, 1968) was a German-born American character actress who began her Hollywood career in her sixties.

== Family ==
Hoffmann was born on May 17, 1871, at Heidelberg (German Empire), the daughter of Walter and Mary Sara Silver (née Fraser) Wesselhoeft. Her father was a German-born doctor who at the time of her birth had left his medical practice in Halifax, Nova Scotia to volunteer his services after the outbreak of the Franco-Prussian War. He returned to North America in early 1873 and opened a general practice in Cambridge, Massachusetts, where Gertrude was raised along with her six siblings.

Though German by birth, Dr. Wesselhoeft was raised in Cambridge where a number of his relatives had established themselves in the medical community there. He received his medical degree from Harvard University in 1859 and upon graduation began his practice in Halifax. In time he became associated with the Massachusetts Homeopathic Hospital and a frequent lecturer at Boston University Medical School. At the time of his death in 1920, aged 80, Dr. Wesselhoeft was Emeritus Professor of Clinical Medicine in the School of Medicine at the University of Cambridge, a position he had held since 1908.

Mary Fraser was a native of Halifax, and she died in 1886, around the age of 40. Dr. Wesselhoeft remarried in 1896 to Mary A. Leavitt, a native of Lowell, Massachusetts, and only a few years older than his eldest child. Gertrude's youngest sister, Eleanor Wesselhoeft (1882–1945), was a stage actress and playwright who also found some success late in life as a character actor in Hollywood. Eleanor was married to Albert Christian Henderson von Tornow (1867–1938), a Shakespearean actor who performed under the stage name Albert Henderson.

== Marriage ==
On June 23, 1894, in Cambridge, Massachusetts, Gertrude married Ralph Hoffmann (1870–1932), a native of Stockbridge, Massachusetts, whose family had emigrated from Germany a generation earlier. He was a teacher of natural history and had a keen interest in ornithology. He co-founded the Alstead School of Natural History in Alstead, New Hampshire and taught there for several summers and the rest of his year was spent teaching at Buckingham Browne and Nichols in Cambridge.

From the spring of 1910 until 1917, he was headmaster of the Country Day School founded by Vassie Ward (1875-1954) in Kansas City, Missouri. He later was named director of the Santa Barbara Museum of Natural History in California. Ralph Hoffmann died from a fall while on a scientific expedition to California's Channel Islands in 1932.

The couple had two daughters and a son. Eleanor Hoffmann was born on December 21, 1895, in Belmont, Massachusetts and died on December 20, 1990, in Santa Barbara, California. Walter Wesselhoeft Hoffmann was born on December 20, 1897, in Belmont, Massachusetts and died on May 7, 1977, in Cambridge, Massachusetts. The youngest child, Gertrude "Trudy" Hoffmann, was born on April 2, 1904, in Belmont, Massachusetts. Trudy married British composer Sir Arthur Bliss on June 1, 1925, in Santa Barbara, California and moved to London, England, where she lived until her death in 2008.

== Acting career ==
Gertrude W. Hoffmann's first Hollywood role was playing Mattie in Before Dawn that premiered on August 4, 1933. She would go on to have a 30-year career as a character actor, appearing in a number of movies and television shows. Among her credits are such films as Alfred Hitchcock's Foreign Correspondent, The File on Thelma Jordon (1950), Caged (1950), and The War of the Worlds (1953). She played Mrs. Odetts in the 1950s sitcom My Little Margie and made her final performance in an episode of the sitcom Car 54, Where Are You? in 1963.

== Death ==
Gertrude W. Hoffmann died on February 13, 1968, in Santa Barbara, California. She was interred at Grand View Memorial Park Cemetery in Glendale, California.

== Filmography ==
Year	Title	Role	Notes
1917	Ein nasses Abenteuer		
1918	The Blue Lantern	Hilde	
1919	Prinzessin Tatjanah	Tatjana	
1919	Sie können bei mir schlafen		
1919	Heddas Rache		
1919	Prostitution		
1919	Die ums Leben spielen	Ilona	
1920	Das Geheimnis der Mitternachtsstunde		
1920	Tagebuch meiner Frau		
1920	Auri Sacra Fames, 1. Teil - An der Liebe Narrenseil		
1920	Humanity Unleashed	Rita, Clarenbachs Frau	
1920	Auri Sacra Fames, 2. Teil - Das Testament eines Exzentrischen		
1920	Satans Peitsche		
1920	Rafaello - Das Rätsel von Kopenhagen 1		
1920	Lepain - 6. Teil		
1920	Lepain - 5. Teil		
1920	Lepain, der König der Verbrecher - 4. Teil		
1920	Lepain, der König der Verbrecher - 3. Teil		
1920	Der Spitzel		
1920	Der Schrecken der Millionäre		
1921	Die Ratten		
1921	Das Gewissen der Welt, 1. Teil - Schattenpflanzen der Großstadt	Dama	
1921	The Handicap of Love		
1921	Kaschemmenadel		
1922	Louise de Lavallière	Marquise François Athenais von Montespan	
1922	Der Fall Gembalsky		
1923	Die Schlucht des Todes	Countess Gabriela	
1933	Before Dawn	Mattie	
1933	Hell and High Water	Mom Wealin	
1934	I'll Tell the World	Aunt Louise	Uncredited
1934	The Cat's-Paw	Mrs. Noon - Cobb's Landlady	Uncredited
1934	6 Day Bike Rider	Old Lady	Uncredited
1935	Les Misérables	Nurse	Uncredited
1936	A Son Comes Home	Effie Wimple	
1936	The Gentleman from Louisiana	Miss Langley	
1937	Mountain Justice	Granny Burnside	Uncredited
1938	Cassidy of Bar 20	Ma Caffrey	
1939	Laugh It Off	Carrie	Uncredited
1940	East Side Kids	Old Lady in Montage	Uncredited
1940	Untamed	Miss Rhine	
1940	Foreign Correspondent	Mrs. Benson	
1940	The Ape	Jane - Adrian's Housekeeper	
1941	Lydia	Mrs. Fairfield	Uncredited
1941	One Foot in Heaven	Elderly Woman	Uncredited
1941	Suspicion	Mrs. Wetherby	Uncredited
1941	No Hands on the Clock	Passerby Below Clock	Uncredited
1942	North of the Rockies	Flora Bailey	
1942	The Wife Takes a Flyer	Mrs. Gruyson	Uncredited
1942	Texas Trouble Shooters	Granny Wilson	
1942	I Married an Angel	Lady Gimcrack	Uncredited
1942	Tish	Spinster	Uncredited
1942	Commandos Strike at Dawn	Elderly Village Woman	Uncredited
1943	The Moon Is Down	Villager	Uncredited
1943	Dr. Gillespie's Criminal Case	Grandmother	Uncredited
1943	A Guy Named Joe	Old Woman	Uncredited
1943	What a Woman!	Night Maid	Uncredited
1944	The Heavenly Body	Mrs. Potter's Mother	Uncredited
1945	The Clock	Old Woman Painter	Uncredited
1946	The Bride Wore Boots	Mrs. Harvey - Mason-Dixon Dames Club Woman	Uncredited
1947	California	Old Woman	Uncredited
1947	Welcome Stranger	Miss Wendy	Uncredited
1949	Roseanna McCoy	Old Woman at Campfire	Uncredited
1950	The File on Thelma Jordon	Aunt Vera Edwards	
1950	Caged	Millie Lewis	Uncredited
1951	The Company She Keeps	Mrs. Kaufman	Uncredited
1951	Close to My Heart	Mrs. Madison	Uncredited
1953	The War of the Worlds	Elderly News Vendor	Uncredited
1955	Alfred Hitchcock Presents	Margaret Stoddard	Season 1 Episode 9: "The Long Shot"
1955	Not as a Stranger	Mrs. Payton	Uncredited
