= Santa Barbara Museum of Natural History =

Natural history museum in California

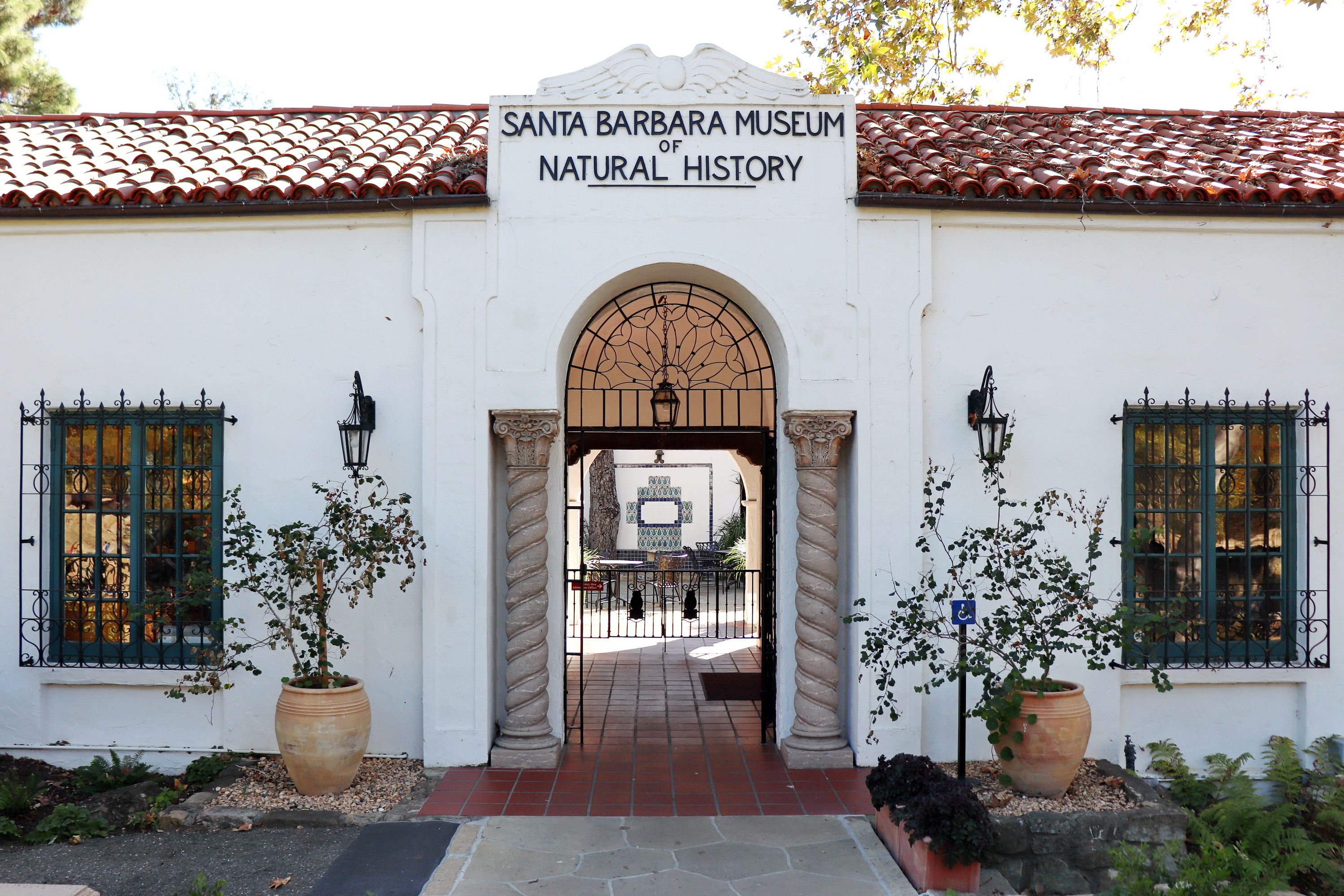
- Established: 1916; 110 years ago
- Location: 2559 Puesta del Sol; Santa Barbara, CA
- Coordinates: 34°26′28.14″N 119°42′52.30″W
- Type: Natural history museum
- Website: www.sbnature.org

The Santa Barbara Museum of Natural History is a natural history museum in Santa Barbara, California.

The Santa Barbara Museum of Natural History organization is a 501(c)(3) non-profit which operates both a flagship Mission Canyon campus located along Mission Creek in the Upper Eastside, and the ocean-focused Sea Center located on Stearns Warf. As of 2023, the museum served about 230,000 visitors annually, with attendance split roughly evenly across its two campuses.

The museum has a variety of indoor exhibit halls and outdoor spaces to provide additional hands-on and interactive learning opportunities to visitors. Permanent exhibits focus on regional natural history, including native wildlife (particularly botany, entomology, mammalogy, and ornithology), marine life, and the history of native Chumash people. Additional exhibits focus on astronomy, geology, paleontology, and the area's unique Mediterranean climate. Among the facilities are a historic research library, the Palmer Observatory, and the John & Peggy Maximus Gallery, housing a collection of over 5,000 antique nature prints and illustrations. The museum claims to host the only full-dome planetarium on the Central Coast.

== History ==
=== Founding ===
The earliest local organization dedicated to natural history was the Santa Barbara Society of Natural History, which operated a museum at 1226 State Street from 1875 into the 1900s. Among its leadership were pioneering American female botanists Caroline Bingham and Sarah Paxon Moore Cooper, as well as American paleontologist, Lorenzo Gordin Yates. This first organization appears to have dissolved by the time a separate group of locals first met on January 31, 1916, to organize what would become the precursor to today's museum. This new effort was led by ornithologist William Leon Dawson who donated his extensive collection of bird eggs as well as two structures on his Mission Canyon property to establish the Museum of Comparative Oology. Former president of Wellesley College, Caroline Hazard, would join the museum's board of directors in 1918 and quickly became among its most important leaders and benefactors.

Dawson would head the museum until his resignation in 1923 following disagreement with the board of directors, which wanted to expand offerings from oology into other areas of natural history, a proposition Dawson vehemently opposed. He was succeeded by educator, botanist, and ornithologist, Ralph Hoffmann. Noted archeologist and anthropologist, Harold S. Gladwin would also join as Curator. Anticipating these organizational changes, in 1922 Caroline Hazard donated some of her estate to the museum while her sister-in-law, Mrs. Rowland G. Hazard, donated funds to construct the first structures which would become the modern-day museum grounds. The museum thereby moved from its first location on Puesta del Sol road, down the street to its current location and reopened in April, 1923. The building's architect was Carleton Winslow. During this time, American sculptor Elizabeth Mason also provided dioramas of early Native American life for the museum. Upon visiting the museum with his wife in 1931, Albert Einstein remarked, "I can see that this museum has been built by the work of love".

Hoffman was succeeded in 1933 by Paul Marshall Rea, former president of the American Association of Museums and director of the Cleveland Museum of Natural History. Rea was succeeded in 1937 by Arthur Sterry Coggeshall, a career museologist who had worked at various prestigious museums, such as the American Museum of Natural History in New York City and the Carnegie Museum of Natural History in Pittsburgh. As condition of his agreeing to take the position, Coggeshall convinced Max Fleischmann, local heir to the Fleischmann Yeast fortune, to fund the construction of the museum's auditorium, now known as Fleischmann Auditorium. Coggeshall would hold the position for 21 years, during which time he professionalized the museum and acted as a central figure in the founding of the California Association of Museums and the Western Museum Association. The museum would also benefit from the unusually high number of nationally renowned artists residing in Santa Barbara at the time, receiving contributions from Carl Oscar Borg, Belmore Browne, John Marshall Gamble, Fernand Lungren, Douglass Ewell Parshall, and Lilia Tuckerman.

Coggeshall was succeeded as director upon his death in 1958 by Dr. Vertress L. VanderHoof, a research geologist from the University of California, Berkeley who served in the role until 1963. Nora Morres served as interim director (as she had temporarily done following Coggeshall's death) until the naming of Dr. Frederick H. Pough director in 1965. Pough was a vulcanologist and mineralogist from the American Museum of Natural History. In 1972, following further interim directors, the museum hired Dr. Dennis Power, an evolutionary biologist specializing in the biogeography of island birds. Power was a native Californian who at the time was an Associate Curator at the Royal Ontario Museum in Toronto. He would become the longest serving director, serving 22 years until 1994 when he left to become executive director of the Oakland Museum of California.

=== Modern Development ===
From the 1960s through the 1990s, the museum had a large role in the field of environmental action. Museum scientists have continued to play leading roles in the development of nationally recognized research efforts and initiatives, including establishment of the Marine Mammal Stranding Network to report beached marine wildlife, now overseen by the National Marine Fisheries Service, and conservation of the California Condor. Museum staff also undertake contracted biological and anthropological surveys, among the most significant being the initial studies for the National Park Service that eventually led to the creation of Channel Islands National Park.

The museum houses the largest collection of Chumash and pre-Chumash artifacts in the world. In 2022 the museum transferred the archeological remains of more than 1,000 Chumash and pre-Chumash individuals to the Santa Ynez Band of Chumash Indians, in accordance with a request made by the tribe under the Native American Graves Protection and Repatriation Act. Among these artifacts were human bones dated at over 13,000 years old, believed to be the oldest human remains ever recovered in North America and supporting the 'kelp highway hypothesis' asserting that early peopling of the Americas may have occurred via ocean voyage rather than land bridge.

== Exhibits ==
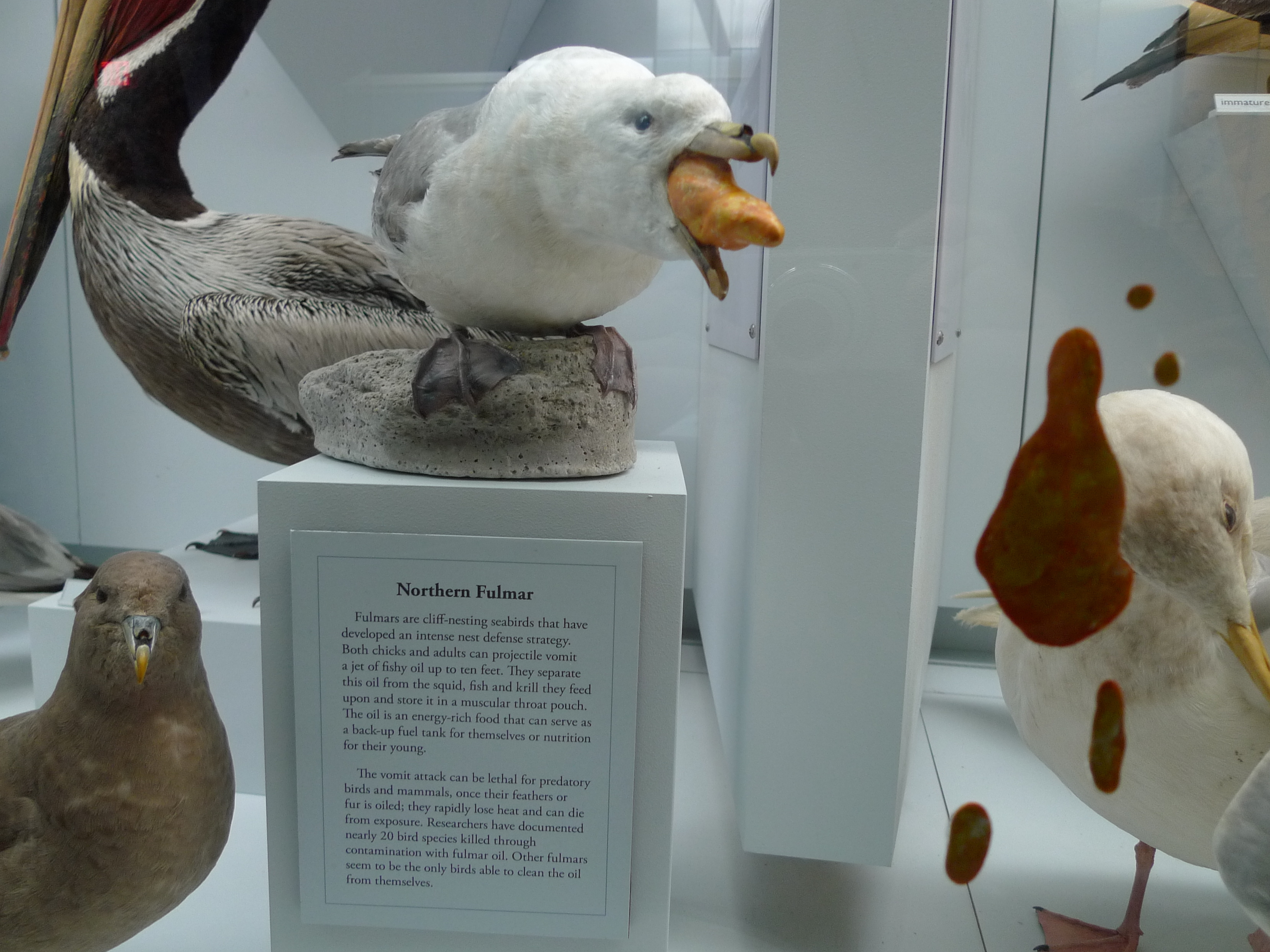
The exhibit of taxidermied birds includes a mockup of the northern fulmar's stomach oil attack.

The museum is renowned for fine dioramas of birds, mammals, and southern California habitats. These were illustrated in the 1930s and 1960s by famous artists of the California school of plein-aire painters. Among the most notable of these is the Bird Habitat Hall featuring mounted specimens by staff members Egmont Rett and Waldo Abbott and background paintings by Ray Strong. The museum also has halls of marine life, geology, and Chumash Indian life, as well as an art gallery dedicated to antique natural history prints. It has collections of over 3 million specimens and an active research program with a focus on marine biology, terrestrial vertebrates, insects, anthropology, geological mapping, and natural history art. Greeting visitors near the front entrance is what has become an iconic display for the museum and Santa Barbara: a rearticulated skeleton of a 72 feet (22 m) blue whale.

Temporary exhibits cover the whole range of natural history topics such as dinosaurs, sharks, antique natural history art, "Butterflies Alive" and “Bringing the Condors Home” telling the story of the decline and beginning of recovery of the California condor. The museum's Gladwin Planetarium was renovated in early 2005 and equipped with technology to display distant planets, stars, and galaxies. The museum will launch a $30 million remodel in fall 2016, starting with the butterfly pavilion.

The museum has one of the largest extant collections of historical Native American basketry by Chumash basket weaver artists.

=== Sea Center ===
The Santa Barbara Museum of Natural History Sea Center, formerly known as the "Ty Warner Sea Center", is located on Santa Barbara's historic Stearns Wharf. It originally opened in 1986 and was expanded and renovated in 2005. Among the exhibits of the Sea Center are a life-size model of a gray whale and calf, tide pool with waves rushing into it every 60 seconds, the Wet Deck featuring direct access to the water below, the Channel Theater, the Workshop, the Whale Karaoke station, and the plastinated dolphin.

== See also ==
- List of museums in California
- Visual arts by indigenous Californians
- Native American basket weavers
- Basket weaving
