= Santa Barbara Museum of Natural History Sea Center =

Museum in Santa Barbara, California, US

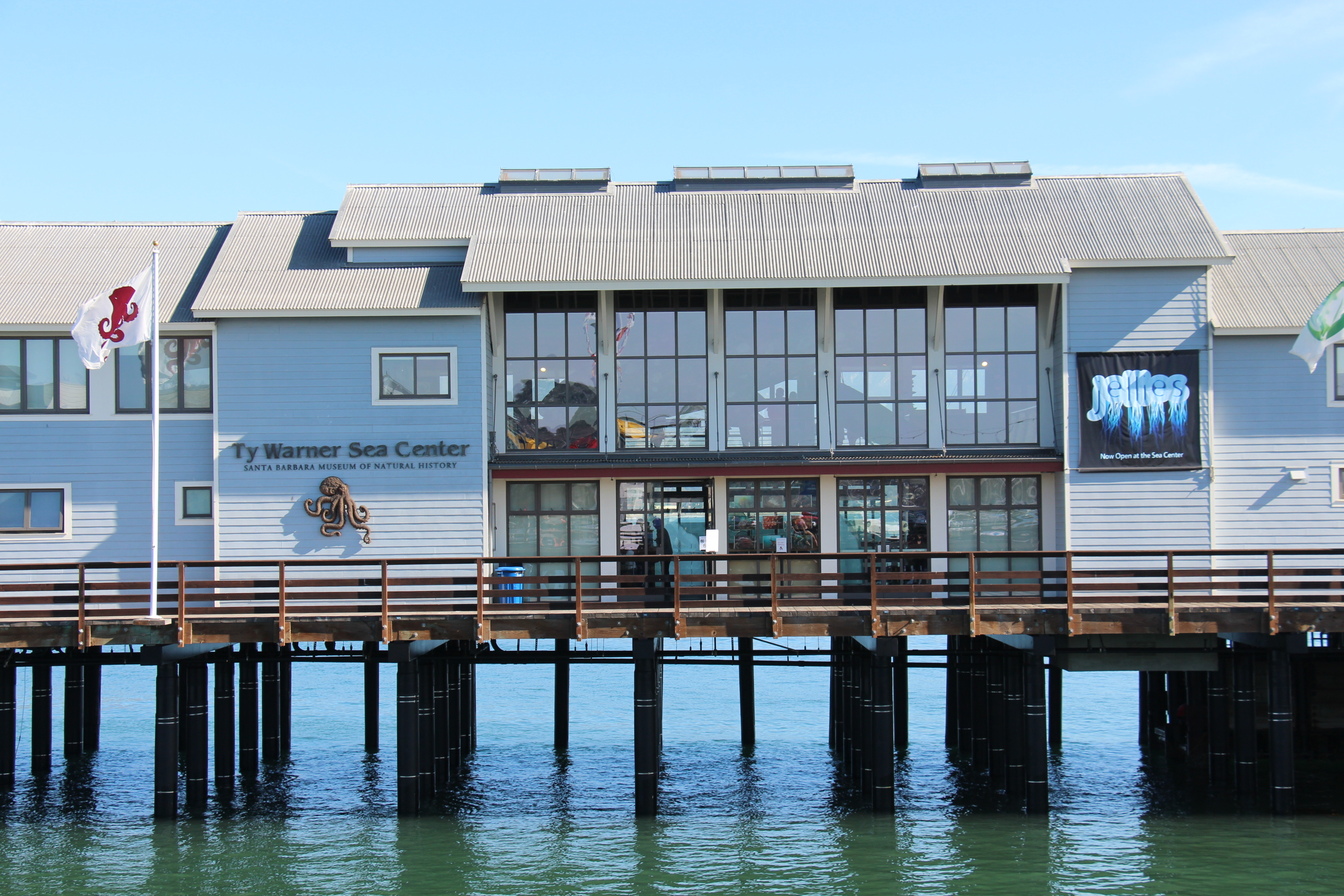
- Santa Barbara Museum of Natural History Sea Center
- Interactive map of Santa Barbara Museum of Natural History Sea Center
- 34°24′37.90″N 119°41′10.05″W
- Location: Santa Barbara, California, United States
- Website: www.sbnature.org/visit/sea-center

The Santa Barbara Museum of Natural History Sea Center, briefly known as the Ty Warner Sea Center, is a museum owned and operated by the Santa Barbara Museum of Natural History and is located on Santa Barbara's Stearns Wharf. The Sea Center focuses on the marine life and the related conservation of the Santa Barbara Channel.

== History ==
The Sea Center, first opened in 1986, was forced to close almost immediately owing to a fire under the Stearns Wharf pier on which it sits, and opened again a year later after repairs and more exhibits were added. Among the highlights of the original museum, and which still exist today, are a life-size model of a gray whale and her calf, aquaria, and static exhibits about marine life and ocean ecology.

After many successful years, an opportunity became available to expand, adding building space, larger touch tanks, and new exhibits. The Center reopened in 2005 at a cost of $6.5 million. The expanded building's major donor at that time was businessman Ty Warner, also a local resident. Following a rebranding of the Santa Barbara Museum of Natural History in 2016, the Sea Center returned to its original name.

== Exhibits ==
Several permanent exhibits include:

- Living Beach: An interactive tide pool.
- BioLab: Depicts the biological life cycle of marine creatures, including sharks.
- Wet Deck: Focuses on oceanography and includes the "moon pool," which is an open well that allows access to the external seawater. A theater features videos about the Santa Barbara Channel and the area also features an interactive science lab.
- Mammal Mezzanine: Examines 36 species of marine mammals found in the area, including an exhibition about marine mammal language.

== Gallery ==
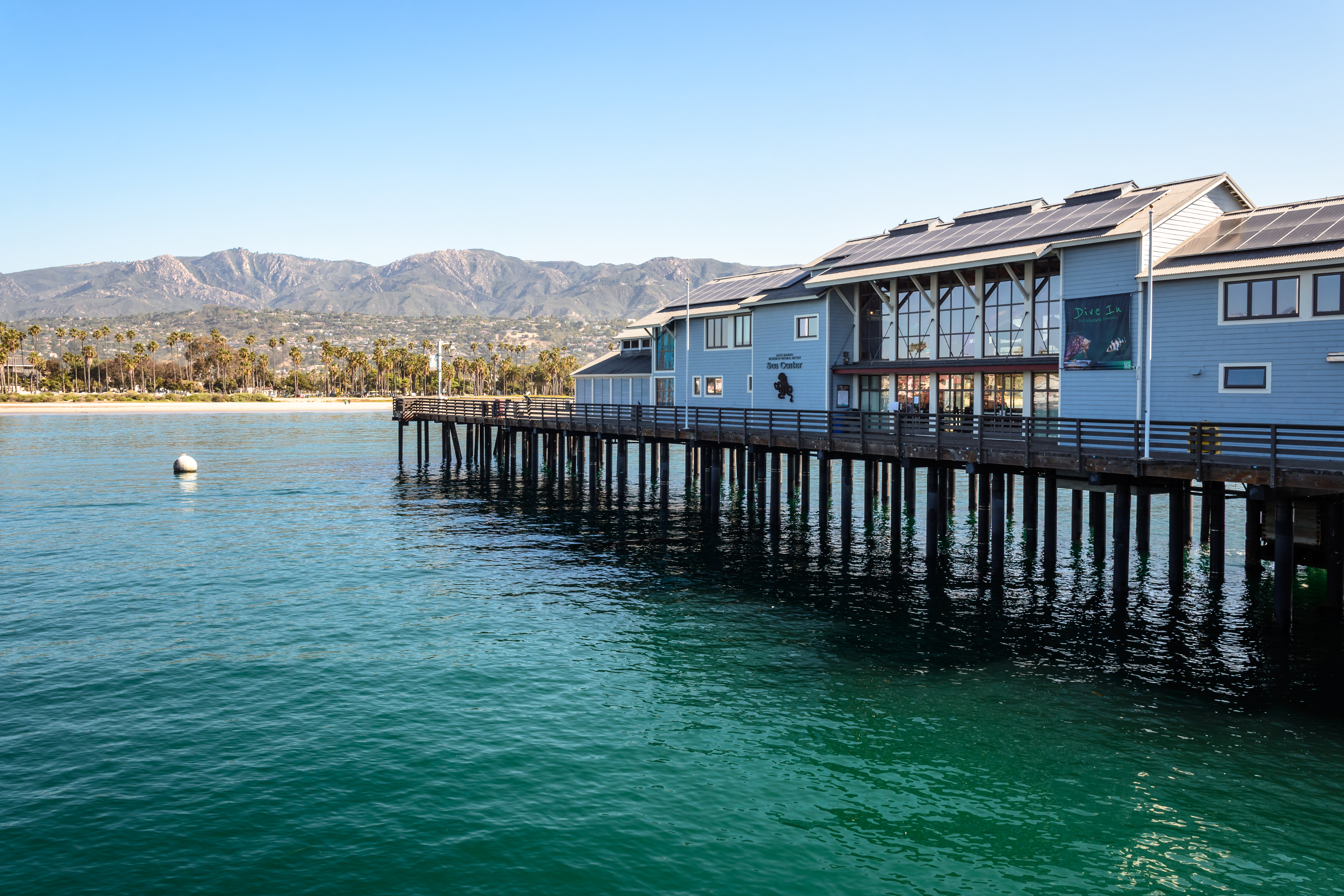
Recent upgrade of solar panels

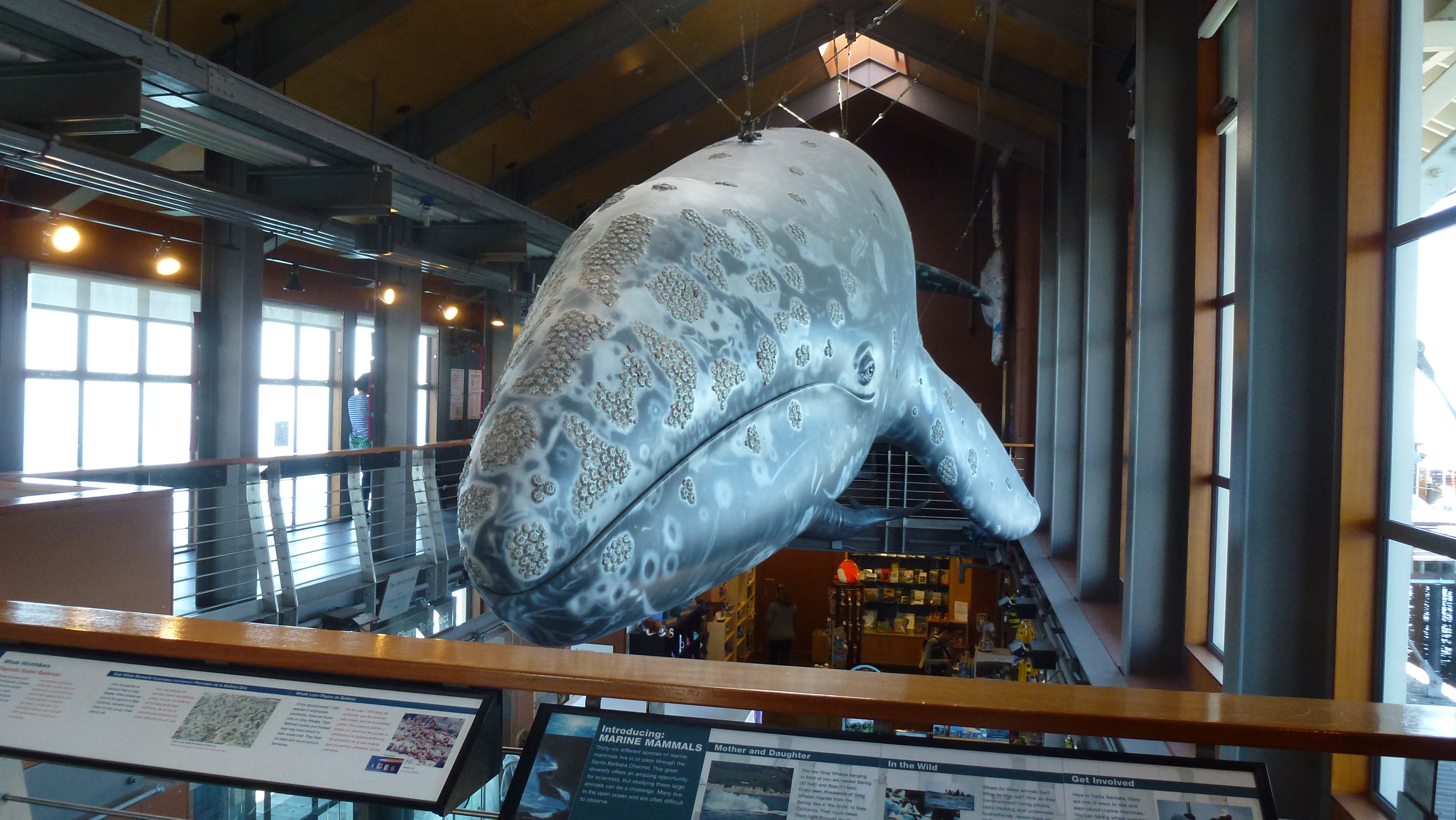
Whale figure above the entry hall

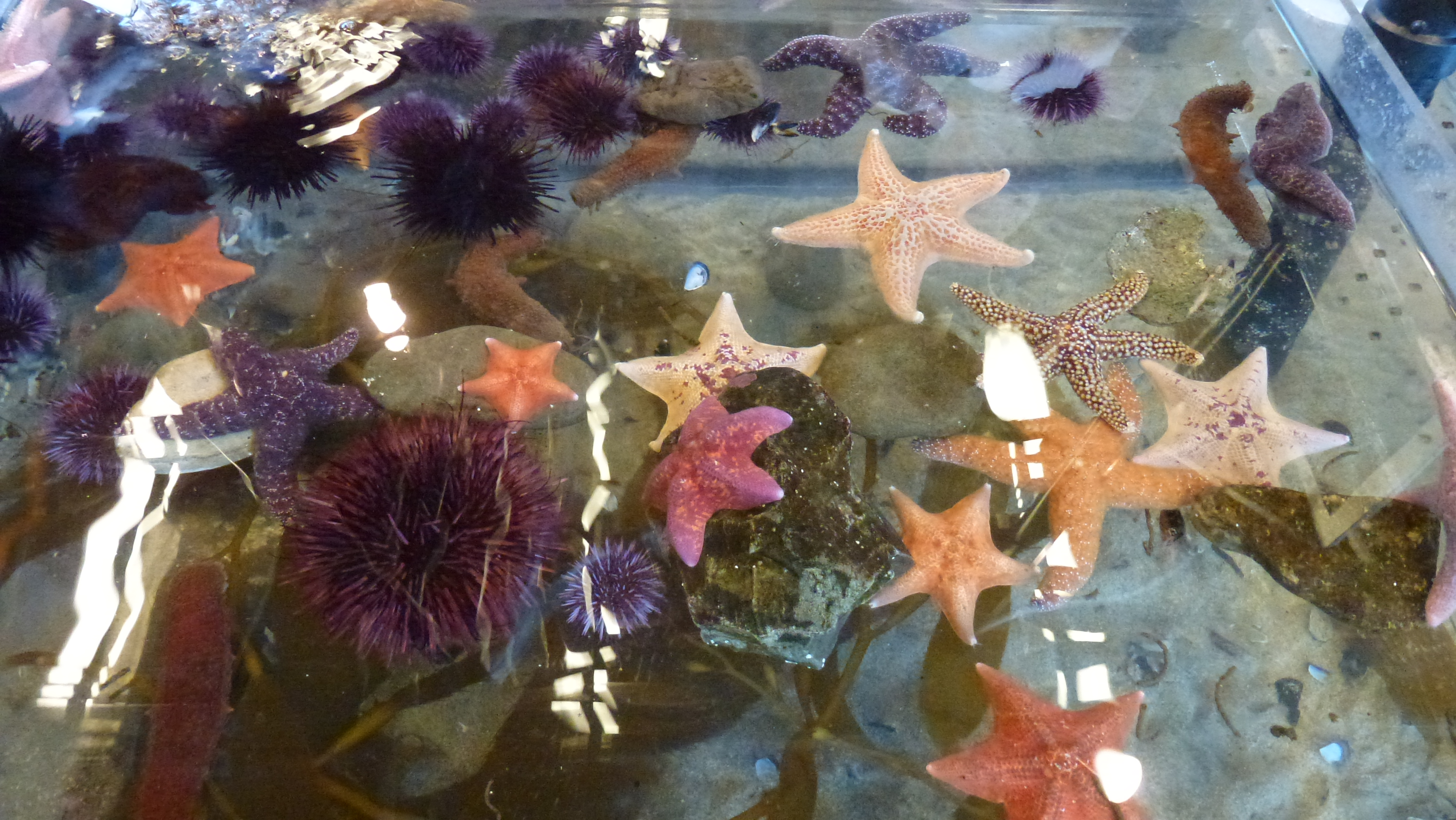
Sea stars and sea urchins

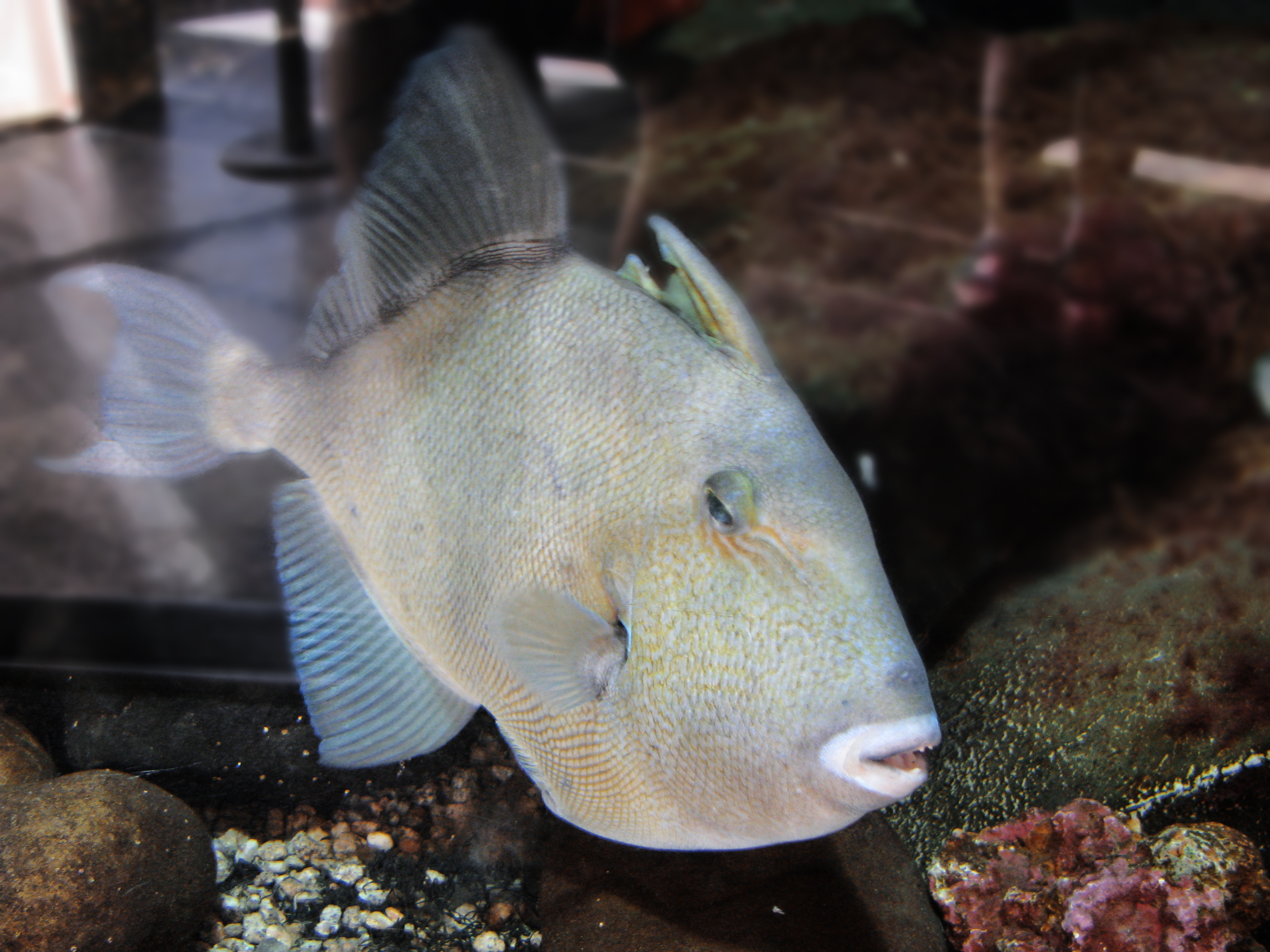
Balistes polylepis

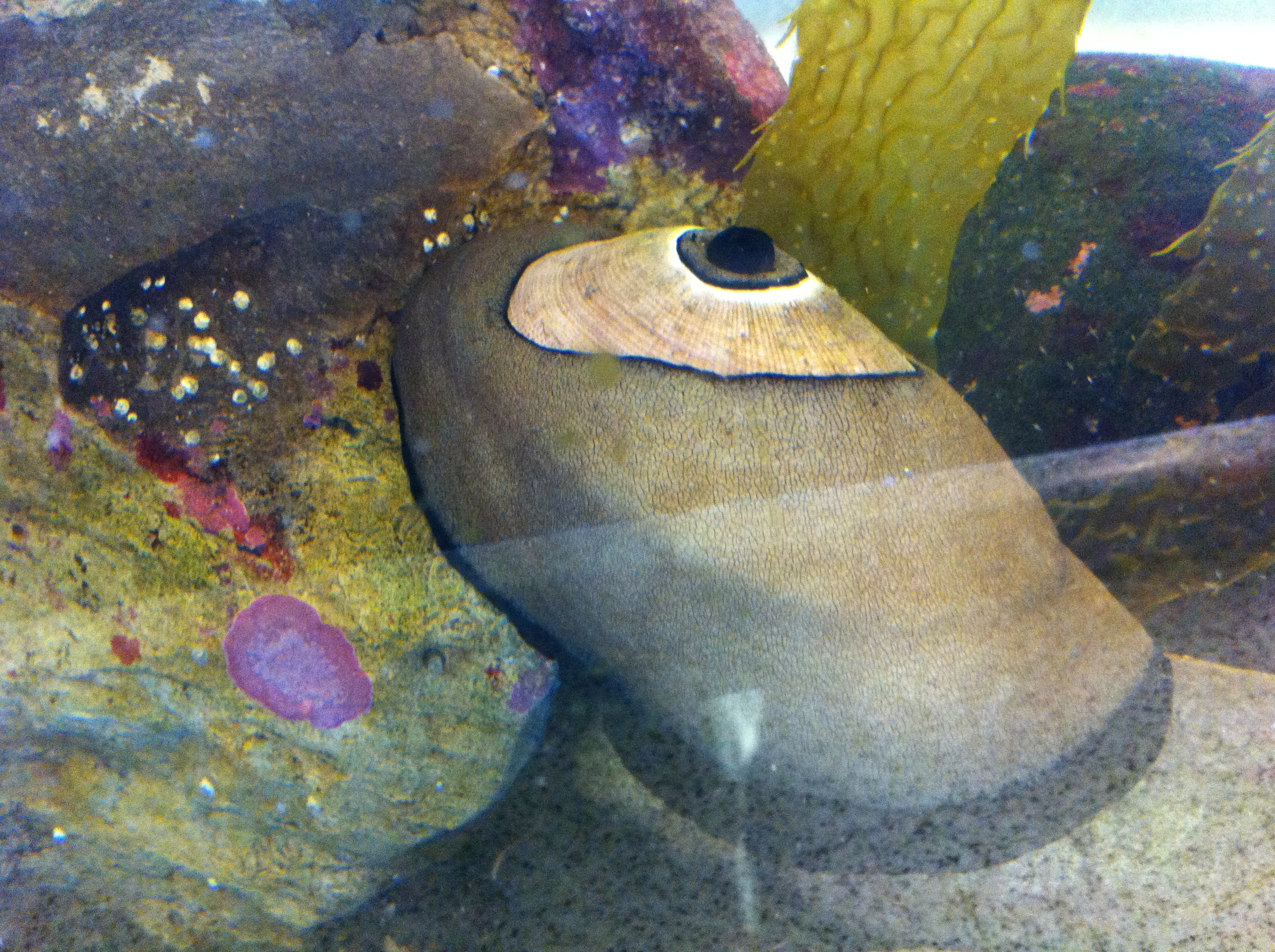
Living specimen of Megathura crenulata (giant keyhole limpet) with mantle extended over shell
