= Hell and High Water (1933 film) =

1933 film

- Directed by: Grover Jones; William Slavens McNutt
- Screenplay by: Grover Jones; Agnes Brand Leahy; William Slavens McNutt; Max Miller
- Starring: Richard Arlen; Judith Allen; Charley Grapewin; Gertrude Hoffman; Guy Standing; S. Matsui; William Frawley
- Cinematography: Alfred Gilks
- Music by: Herman Hand; Howard Jackson
- Production company: Paramount Pictures
- Distributed by: Paramount Pictures
- Release date: October 27, 1933
- Running time: 68 minutes
- Country: United States
- Language: English

Hell and High Water is a 1933 American Pre-Code drama film directed by Grover Jones and William Slavens McNutt and written by Grover Jones, Agnes Brand Leahy, William Slavens McNutt and Max Miller. The film stars Richard Arlen, Judith Allen, Charley Grapewin, Gertrude Hoffman, Guy Standing, and William Frawley. The film was released on October 27, 1933, by Paramount Pictures.

== Plot ==
Cap'n J. "Jeri" Jericho tows garbage for the U.S. Navy, and, inspired by a radio financial advisor named Milton J. Bunsey, lives a very frugal lifestyle to acquire a bigger boat. He finds himself frequently encountering Sally Driggs, a taxi-dancer, who keeps ending up in his net. Sally, who has recently lost her father, lives with shopkeepers Peck and Mom Wealin, and cares for an orphaned baby, Barney, as if it were her own son. Jeri and Sally make furtive attempts to better their circumstances while ultimately becoming smitten with each other.

== Cast ==
- Richard Arlen as Capt. J.J. Jericho
- Judith Allen as Sally Driggs
- Charley Grapewin as Peck Wealin
- Gertrude Hoffman as Mom Wealin
- Guy Standing as Rear Admiral
- S. Matsui as Joe Satsanuki
- William Frawley as Milton J. Bunsey
- Robert Knettles as Barney
- Barton MacLane as Dance Hall Manager
- Esther Muir as Barney's mother
