= Lil' Toot =

Water taxi and tourist attraction in California

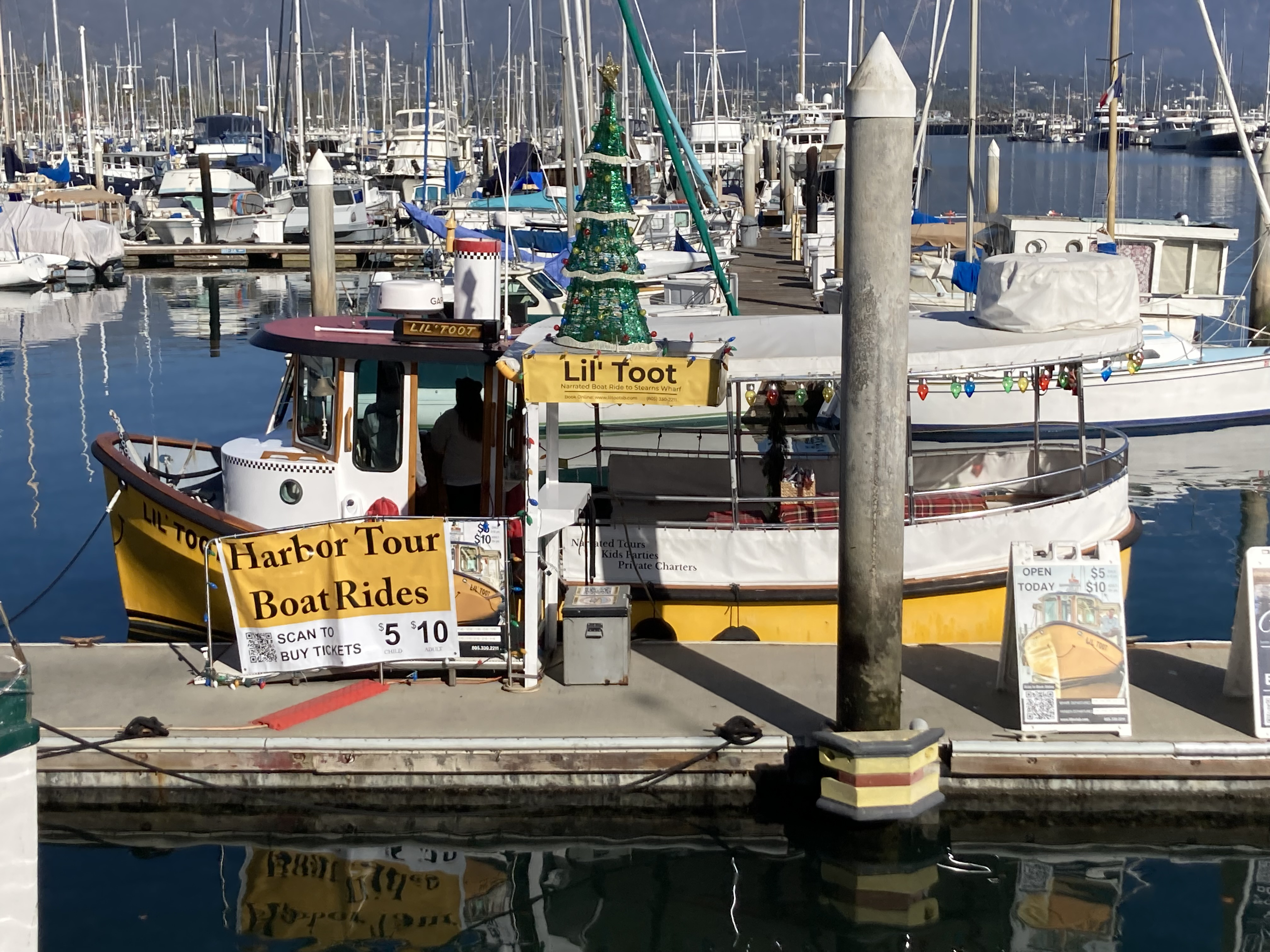
- Lil' Toot docked at the harbor in 2024

Ride statistics
- Attraction type: Boat
- Capacity: 19 riders per hour
- Website: liltootsb.com

Lil' Toot is a water taxi and popular tourist attraction at Stearns Wharf in Santa Barbara, California. It takes passengers from Stearns Wharf to Santa Barbara Harbor. Rides cost $5–10 for a 25-minute ride and tour every hour. The tugboat has a 19-person capacity. Private rides are also sold.

== History ==
Lil' Toot was started by Fred and Kathy Hershman in 2003. The boat's previous name was Captain Red, and Fred, formerly of the United States Coast Guard, first found it broken down in a front yard in Newburyport, Massachusetts. The duo created the company Celebration Cruises to manage the boat and other ships in the city, but sold most of their boats in 2023.

In 2022, Madeline Gabor wrote a children's book about Lil' Toot, called How Lil' Toot Got His Smile.
