= Before Dawn (film) =

1933 film

- Directed by: Irving Pichel
- Screenplay by: Garrett Fort
- Based on: Death Watch; 1932 story in Chicago Daily Tribune by Edgar Wallace
- Produced by: Merian C. Cooper
- Starring: Stuart Erwin; Dorothy Wilson; Warner Oland; Dudley Digges; Gertrude Hoffman
- Cinematography: Lucien N. Andriot
- Edited by: William Hamilton
- Music by: Max Steiner
- Production company: RKO Pictures
- Distributed by: RKO Pictures
- Release date: August 4, 1933
- Running time: 60 minutes
- Country: United States
- Language: English

Before Dawn is a 1933 American pre-Code drama film directed by Irving Pichel and written by Garrett Fort. The film stars Stuart Erwin, Dorothy Wilson, Warner Oland, Dudley Digges and Gertrude Hoffman. It is one of the few Oland films from this period in which he does not play an Asian character. The film was released on August 4, 1933, by RKO Pictures.

== Plot ==
Dying gangster Joe Valerie reveals the hiding place of a million dollars in loot to his physician Dr. Cornelius. The sinister Austrian doctor has designs on the money, but must first outwit detective Dwight Wilson and clairvoyant Patricia Merrick. The setting is an eerie, possibly haunted house in small-town America where the stash is hidden and the bodies begin to accumulate.

== Cast ==
- Stuart Erwin as Dwight Wilson
- Dorothy Wilson as Patricia
- Warner Oland as Dr. Paul Cornelius
- Dudley Digges as Horace Merrick
- Gertrude Hoffman as Mattie
- Oscar Apfel as O'Hara
- Frank Reicher as Joe Valerie
- Jane Darwell as Mrs. Marble

== Reception ==
In a contemporary review for The New York Times, critic Mordaunt Hall wrote: "[T]his particular ruddy specimen is blessed with vigor and imagination. ... There are enough killings and accidental deaths to satisfy the most ardent enthusiasts of such thrillers. And added to this phase of the narrative there is the inevitable romance."
