= William Leon Dawson =

American ornithologist, author and lecturer

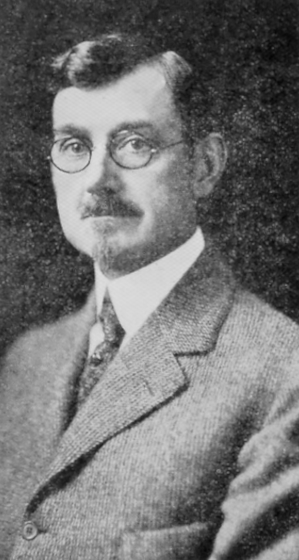
- Born: February 20, 1873; Leon, Iowa, United States
- Died: April 30, 1928 (aged 55); Columbus, Ohio, United States
- Occupations: Ornithologist, author and lecturer
- Spouse: Frances Etta Akerman (m. 1895)

William Leon Dawson (1873–1928) was a noted American ornithologist, author and lecturer.

== Early years ==
William Dawson was born on February 20, 1873 at Leon, a small county seat in southern Iowa just north of the Missouri state line. He was the only child of William E. and Ada Eliza Sarah (née Adams) Dawson and would spend his early years living in Iowa, Kansas, Ohio and Washington state. Dawson received his Bachelor of Arts degree at Oberlin College and his Bachelor of Divinity degree from Oberlin Theological Seminary. Like his father, Dawson became a Seventh-day Adventist minister, but by the early 1900s had chosen instead the field of ornithology as his full-time profession.

== Career ==
Dawson was a lifelong photographer of birds and had over his career authored numerous articles and books on the subject. His major works were Birds of Ohio: A Complete Scientific and Popular Description of the 320 Species of Birds Found in the State (1903), Birds of Washington: A Complete Scientific and Popular Description of the 372 Species of Birds Found in the State (1909) and Birds of California: A Complete Scientific and Popular Description of the 580 Species of Birds Found in the State (1923).

In California, Dawson, a proponent of using bird motifs in art, maintained a studio at Los Colubris in Mission Canyon near Santa Barbara where he displayed his extensive oology and photographic collection. In 1916 he founded the Museum of Comparative Oology on his Mission Canyon property that soon became the Santa Barbara Museum of Natural History. Dawson served as the museum's first director until 1925 when Ralph Hoffmann, a natural history teacher and amateur ornithologist, was named to replace him. Dawson also founded The Birds of California Publishing Company and was involved with several ornithology and nature conservation clubs. Throughout his career Dawson was active on the national lecture circuit giving talks on the different species of birds, their habitats and the importance of conservation.

== Marriage ==
William Dawson married New York native Frances Etta Ackerman at Shabbona, Illinois on May 1, 1895. The couple went on to be the parents of two sons and a daughter, William Oberlin, Giles Edwin, and Barbara Dorothy. William studied to be an ornithologist while Giles Dawson went on be curator of books and manuscripts of the Folger Shakespeare Library.

== Death ==
William Leon Dawson died at White Cross Hospital in Columbus, Ohio on April 30, 1928 after a short bout with influenza that had worsened into pneumonia. At the time of his death he was working on an updated edition of his book Birds of Ohio.
