= Elizabeth Mason (sculptor) =

American sculptor

- Born: June 9, 1880; Jacksonville, Illinois, United States
- Died: June 13, 1953 (aged 73); Santa Barbara, California, United States
- Occupation: Sculptor

Elizabeth Mason (June 9, 1880 – June 13, 1953) was an American sculptor. Her work was part of the sculpture event in the art competition at the 1932 Summer Olympics. She also made substantial contributions of natural history dioramas to the Santa Barbara Museum of Natural History.
