= Ralph Hoffmann =

American naturalist (1870–1932)

- Born: November 30, 1870; Stockbridge, Massachusetts, United States
- Died: July 21, 1932 (aged 61); San Miguel Island, California, United States
- Occupations: Principal, teacher, author, ornithologist, botanist, Museum Director
- Spouse(s): Eliza Gertrude Wesselhoeft (1871-1968); married 1894 to his death (3 children).
- Children: Eleanor Hoffmann (1895-1990); Walter Wesselhoeft Hoffmann (1897-1977); Gertrude "Trude" Hoffmann (1904-2008)
- Writing career
- Notable works: A Guide to the Birds of New England and Eastern New York (1904); Birds of the Pacific States (1927)

Ralph Hoffmann (November 30, 1870 – July 21, 1932) was an American natural history teacher, ornithologist, and botanist. He was the author of the first true bird field guide.

== Early life ==
Ralph Hoffmann was born on November 30, 1870, at Stockbridge, Massachusetts, the second of five children raised by Ferdinand and Caroline Hoffmann. Ferdinand Hoffmann (1827–1906) was born in Germany, the son of a surgeon who had served in Napoleon's army. He came to America in the late 1840s where, with the assistance of educator Jared Reid, he founded the Berkshire Family School for Boys (also known as the Edward Place School for Boys) in 1855. Jared Reid is additionally known for being the father of painter Robert Reid. In 1868, three years after the death of his first wife, Elizabeth J. Hoffmann, Ferdinand married Caroline Bullard (1846–1908), the daughter of a Massachusetts' clergyman. Ralph Hoffmann would go on to attend Harvard University and graduate with the class of 1890.

== Career ==
Hoffmann began teaching at the Buckingham Browne & Nichols School in 1891. A few years later he helped to establish the Alstead School of Natural History in Alstead, New Hampshire where for a time he would spend his summer breaks from BB&N teaching. In 1910 he was chosen to be the first head of the Country Day School in Kansas City. Nine years later he relocated to Santa Barbara to teach natural history at the Cate School for Boys. There he became a mentor to the American botanist G. Ledyard Stebbins. In 1925, Hoffmann was named to succeed William Leon Dawson as director of the Santa Barbara Museum of Natural History.

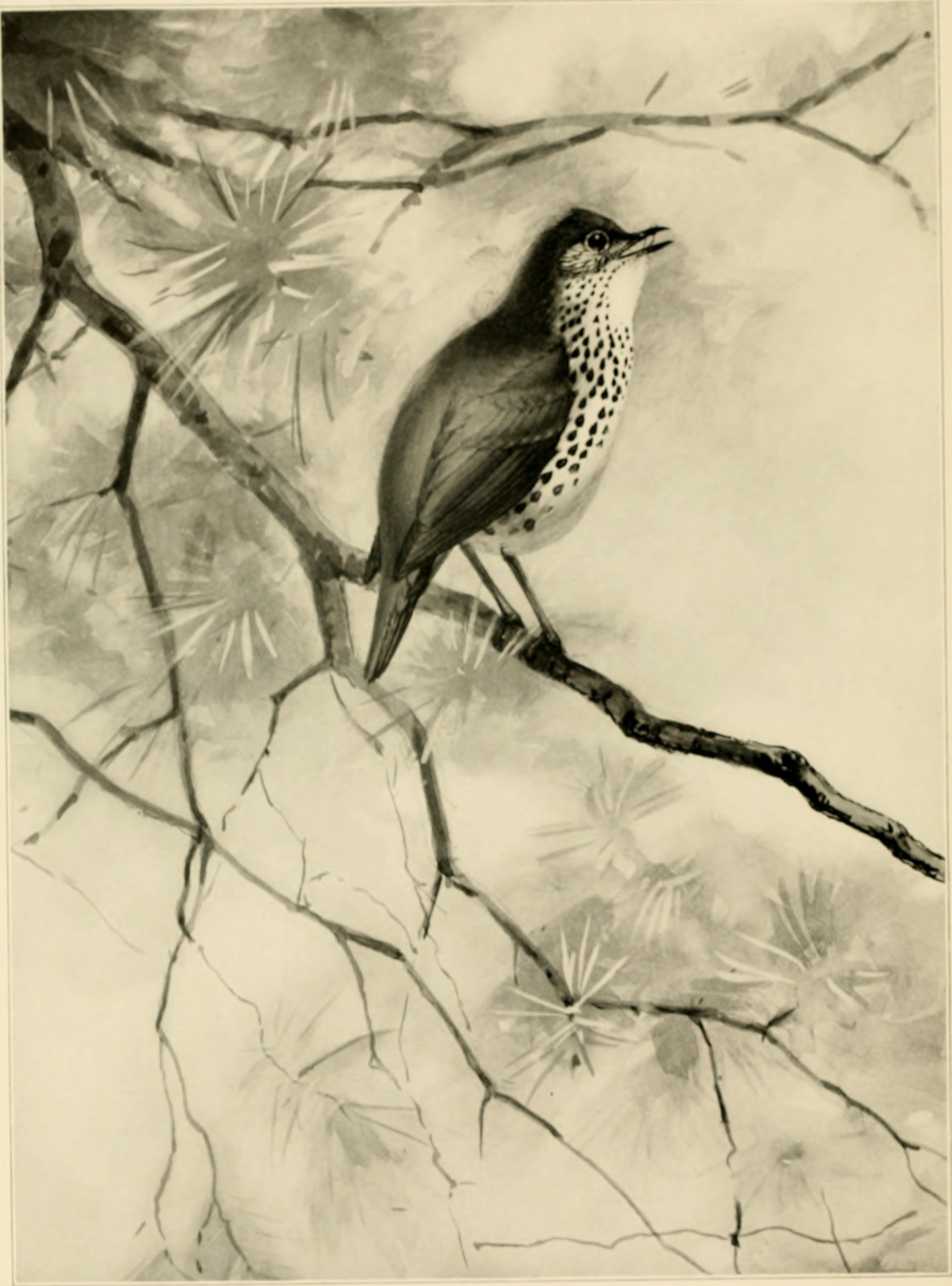
Illustration of a wood thrush (Hylocichla mustelina) from Hoffmann's 1901 Portraits of Birds

In 1901 Hoffmann published with Ernest Thompson Seton Bird Portraits and in 1904 released A Guide to the Birds of New England and Eastern New York, a work that focused on field marks, behavior, habitat, call notes and songs in order to facilitate bird identification in the field. In 1922 he published a monograph on the flora of Berkshire County, Massachusetts, and in 1927 Birds of the Pacific States.

== Marriage ==
On June 23, 1894, Hoffmann married at Cambridge, Massachusetts, Eliza Gertrude Wesselhoeft, the daughter of a prominent German-American doctor. Over the following ten years the couple became the parents of two daughters and a son. After her husband's death in 1932, Gertrude turned to acting and began what would become a 30-year career as a character actor in Hollywood.

== Death ==
On July 21, 1932, Hoffmann joined a group of scientists on an expedition to California's Channel Islands to explore San Miguel Island for fossil remains of the prehistoric pygmy mammoth. Later in the day he separated from his party to search for specimens of a rare flower on the island's rocky cliffs. After he failed to return the group searched the foggy island for some eight hours before finding his body at the base of a steep cliff. The handle on his climbing trowel had broken, apparently causing his fatal fall.

== Selected publications ==
- Common Birds: Second Series, to accompany Audubon Bird Chart No. 2. Massachusetts Audubon Society. 1900. LCCN 04018765.
- Bird portraits. Boston: Ginn & Company. 1901. LCCN 01031792; by Ernest Thompson Seton, with descriptive text by Ralph Hoffmann
- A guide to the birds of New England and Eastern New York. Houghton, Mifflin. 1904. LCCN 04010460.
- Birds of the Pacific states. Houghton, Mifflin. 1927. LCCN 27012874; illustrated by Allan Brooks
