= Mediterranean California =

Ecoregion of North America

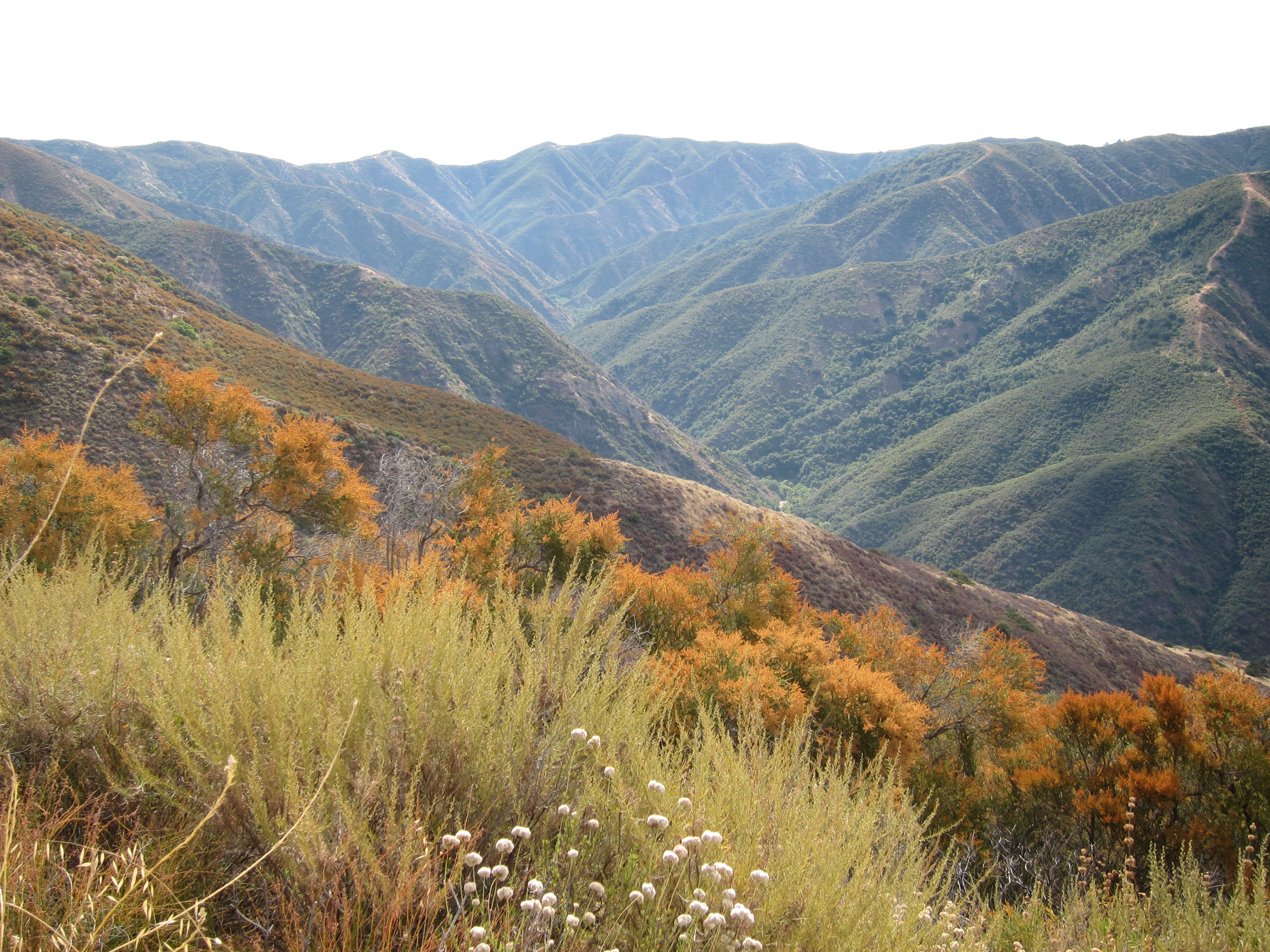
Silverado Canyon and chaparral habitat, in the Peninsular Ranges of Southern California.

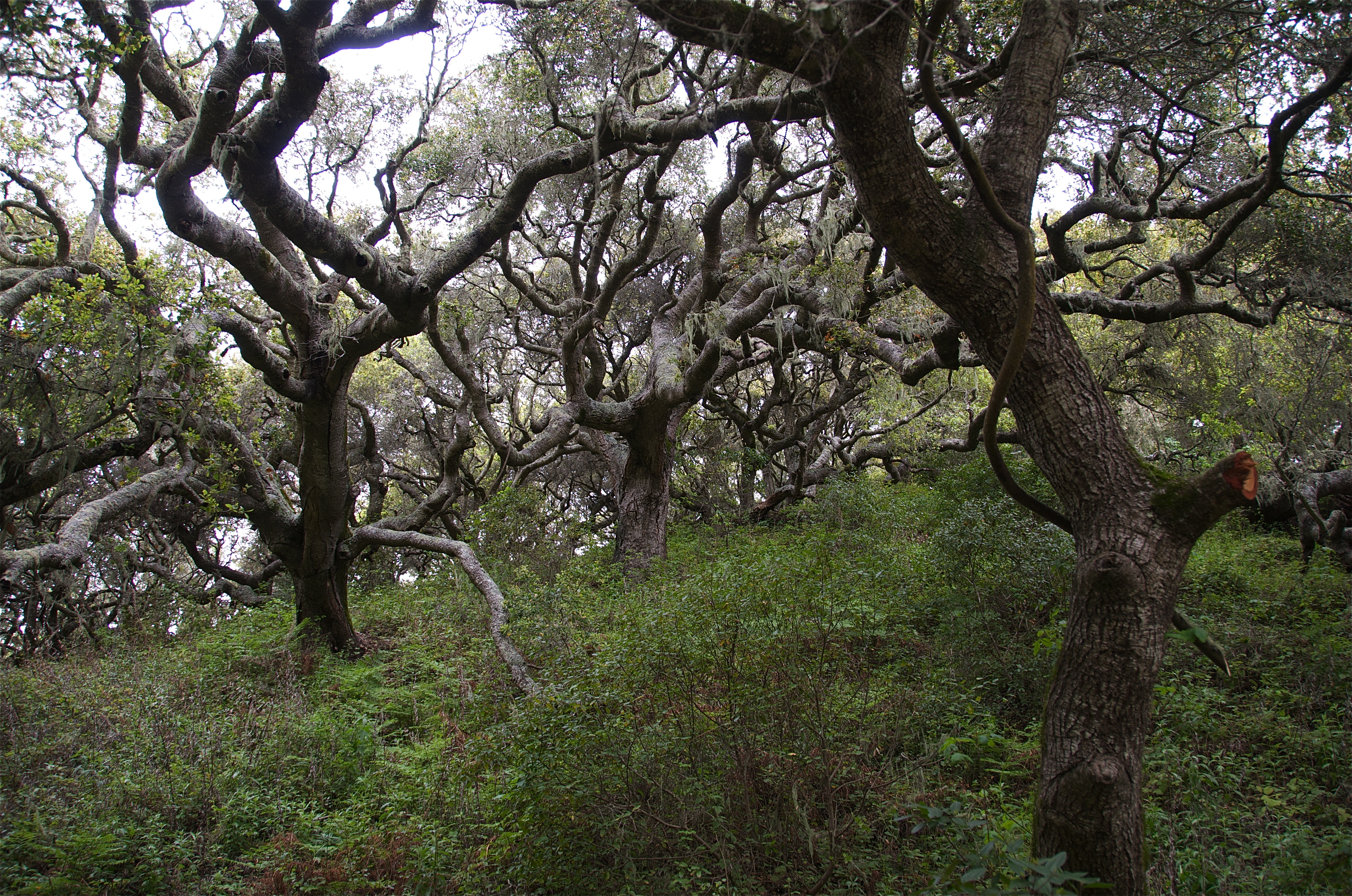
California oak woodland habitat, of the California chaparral and woodlands ecoregion, in San Luis Obispo County.

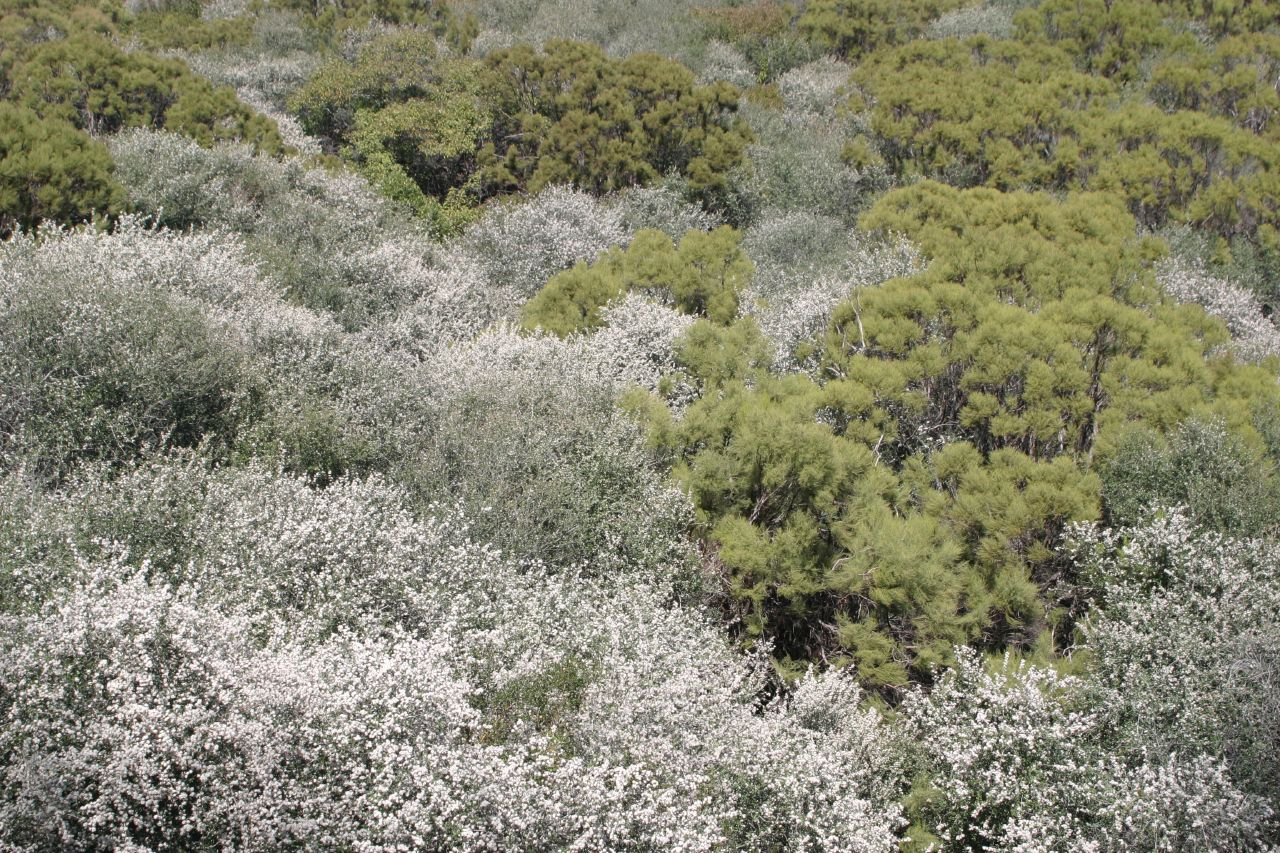
Redshanks (Adenostoma sparsifolium) and bigpod ceanothus (Ceanothus megacarpus), in chaparral habitat of the Santa Monica Mountains.

Mediterranean California is a Level I ecoregion of North America designated by the Commission for Environmental Cooperation (CEC) in its North American Environmental Atlas. The region is present only in California and Baja California.

== Climate ==
Very few places in the world have the Mediterranean climate of California. It is one of the more rare in the world, with only five locations: the Mediterranean basin, the mallee woodlands and shrublands of southern Australia, the fynbos of South Africa, the matorral of central Chile, and the chaparral and woodlands ecoregion of the Californias. The region is typified by warm dry summers and mild wet winters. This is unusual as most climates have more precipitation in the summer. There are three variations to the Mediterranean climate in California, a cool summer/cool winter variation, a cool summer/cool winter with summer fog variation, and a hot summer/cool winter variation. The average temperatures for the cool summer variations are below 71 °F (22 °C) in the summer and between 27–64 °F (−3–18 °C) in the winter. Average summer temperatures for the hot summer variation are above 71 °F (22 °C). Average annual precipitation for this climate is 25–100 inches (640–2,540 mm) per year.

== Hydrology ==
Defined by the Pacific Coast on the west, the Sierra Nevada (mountains) and the deserts of California on the east, and the Northern California Coast Ranges on the north, the Mediterranean California ecoregion has unique physical characteristics that play a large role in the natural systems of the region, including hydrology.

=== Precipitation ===
The unusual precipitation pattern of the Mediterranean climate is due to subtropical high-pressure systems in the summer and the polar jet stream in the winter. Rainfall in the summer is uncommon because the marine layer becomes capped with dry sinking air. The marine layer is an air mass over a large body of water brought about by a temperature inversion from the cooling effect of the water on the warmer air. The marine layer is often accompanied by fog. The polar jet stream in the winter brings with it rain and snow. The jet stream is an extremely powerful air current flowing west to east often at over 100 miles per hour.

The precipitation in the region is closely associated with winter frontal storms from the Pacific Ocean, which bring cool air and rain to the area. The annual rainfall varies in different elevations, but the average range is between 400–800 millimetres (16–31 in) annually. Much of the rain in Central and Northern California flows out the Sacramento and San Joaquin Rivers, which with numerous tributaries run through an upper part of the ecoregion.

Fog is also an important aspect of the hydrologic cycle in this ecoregion; the cooling of air over the warm seawater create a dense fog that covers large areas of the coast. This fog affects the vegetation and overall environment on the coast. On the contrary, fire also influences this region. The fire-flood sequence that occurs post-fire can greatly effect populations of species in the region. The combination of the geophysical characteristics, little rainfall, and the bodies of water in the region make it a unique, distinct environment.

=== Geology ===
Mediterranean climate California's geology is characterized by the meeting of the North American plate and Pacific plate, with much of its region near or influenced by the San Andreas Fault along the junction. When the two plates collided the Pacific plate was pushed under the North American plate, and the California Coast Ranges and Sierra Nevada were uplifted. The Coast Ranges are largely metamorphic rock formed from the submergence of the Pacific plate, and the Sierra are uplifted granite batholiths. Not along the San Andreas Fault, the granitic Peninsular Ranges system also uplifted with the collision, and runs from Southern California, down the Baja California peninsula, into Baja California Sur state, northwest Mexico. The Transverse Ranges are another major Southern California mountain system primarily in the Mediterranean climate zone. Large earthquakes can do considerable damage to populated areas, and to the state's water, transportation, and energy infrastructure.

The Central Valley of California is a significant feature of Mediterranean climate California. It was an ancient oceanic inlet that eventually sediment filled in, the deposition supplied by erosion of the surrounding mountain ranges. The soil is composed of both the metamorphic, oceanic crust-like Coastal Range sediment and the mineral-rich granitic Sierra sediment. The combination creates very fertile soil. The flatness and fertility of the soil, along with the almost year-round sunshine has attracted much agriculture to the area. As a result, native species no longer dominate the landscape. The southern portion, named the San Joaquin Valley, also produces two-thirds of California’s oil from underground reserves. Fossils are found where adjacent tar pits occur.

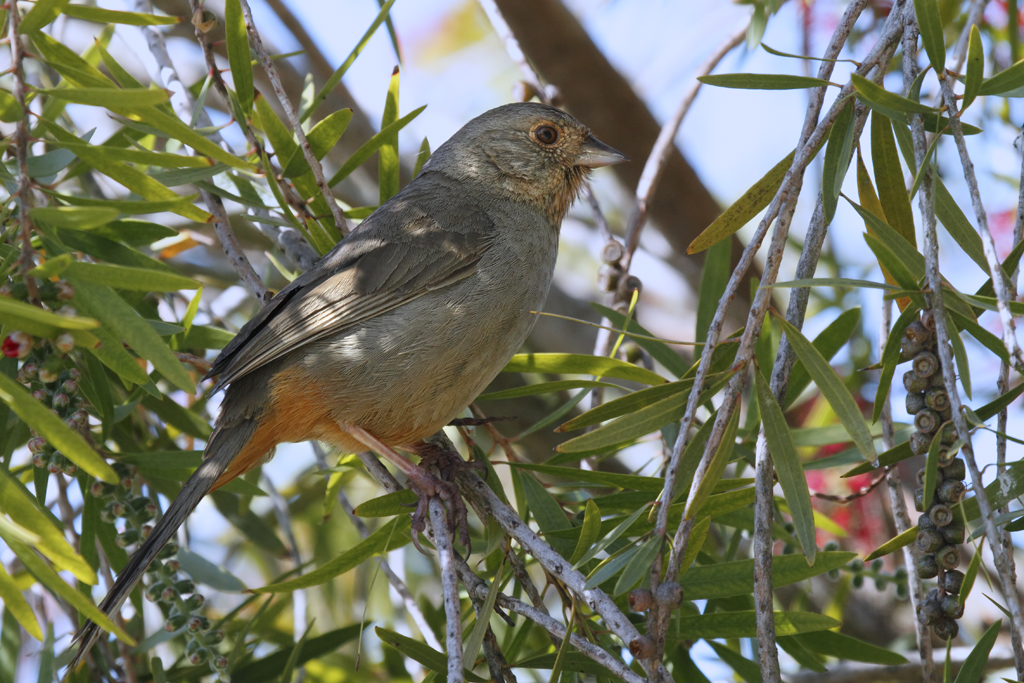
California towhee (Pipilo crissalis), in San Luis Obispo.

Palos Verdes blue (Glaucopsyche lygdamus palosverdesensis), butterfly endemic to the Palos Verdes Peninsula.

== Biota ==
=== Dominant animal species ===
The Mediterranean California ecoregion, is well known for its large variety and abundance of animals. One of these important animals is the American golden eagle, which plays a massive role in maintaining the ecoregion’s ecosystem through its top-down predation on smaller, more abundant animals. The golden eagle is considered to be the apex predator of this community, and there are no other species bigger than them on the food chain. Their lifespan can be up to around 30 years in the wild and even longer in captivity. Native to mountain areas and grasslands, California is a great region for this bird of prey to thrive in. The main reason for the golden eagle being a keystone species of this ecoregion is their ability to keep small herbivorous mammal populations in line. "Prairie Dogs, ground squirrels, other rodents, hares, and rabbits, all of which eat grass and seeds, constitute 77.9% of the golden eagles diet." They also are known to prey on animals such as, cranes, black-tailed jack rabbits, swans, deer, coyotes, badgers, mountain goats, bobcats, and various fish species.

Another less popular species, but yet still keystone to this region, is the kangaroo rat. Studies have shown that kangaroo rats play very large roles in maintaining the population sizes and animal diversity throughout the region. Although they are small and on the verge of extinction, these animals play a large role in maintaining plant diversity, which helps the various herbivores with food supply, and also protection for other small animals seeking shelter. kangaroo rats occupy many land habitats ranging from desserts, and grasslands, to chaparral areas making them present in all areas of the Mediterranean California ecoregion. Kangaroo rats like to feed on many various grass seeds, as well as mesquite beans and thus is the reason that plants tend to not grow as well when sharing the same community with these rats. On occasions though, these animals like to feed on green vegetation, and insects. Unfortunately for the rat though, it is preyed upon by many predators. These predators include, owls, snakes, bobcats, foxes, badgers, coyotes, cats and dogs, and many more. Other dominant species in the region include, mountain lions, coyotes, sea otters, brown bears, and various large birds of prey.

=== Dominant plant communities ===
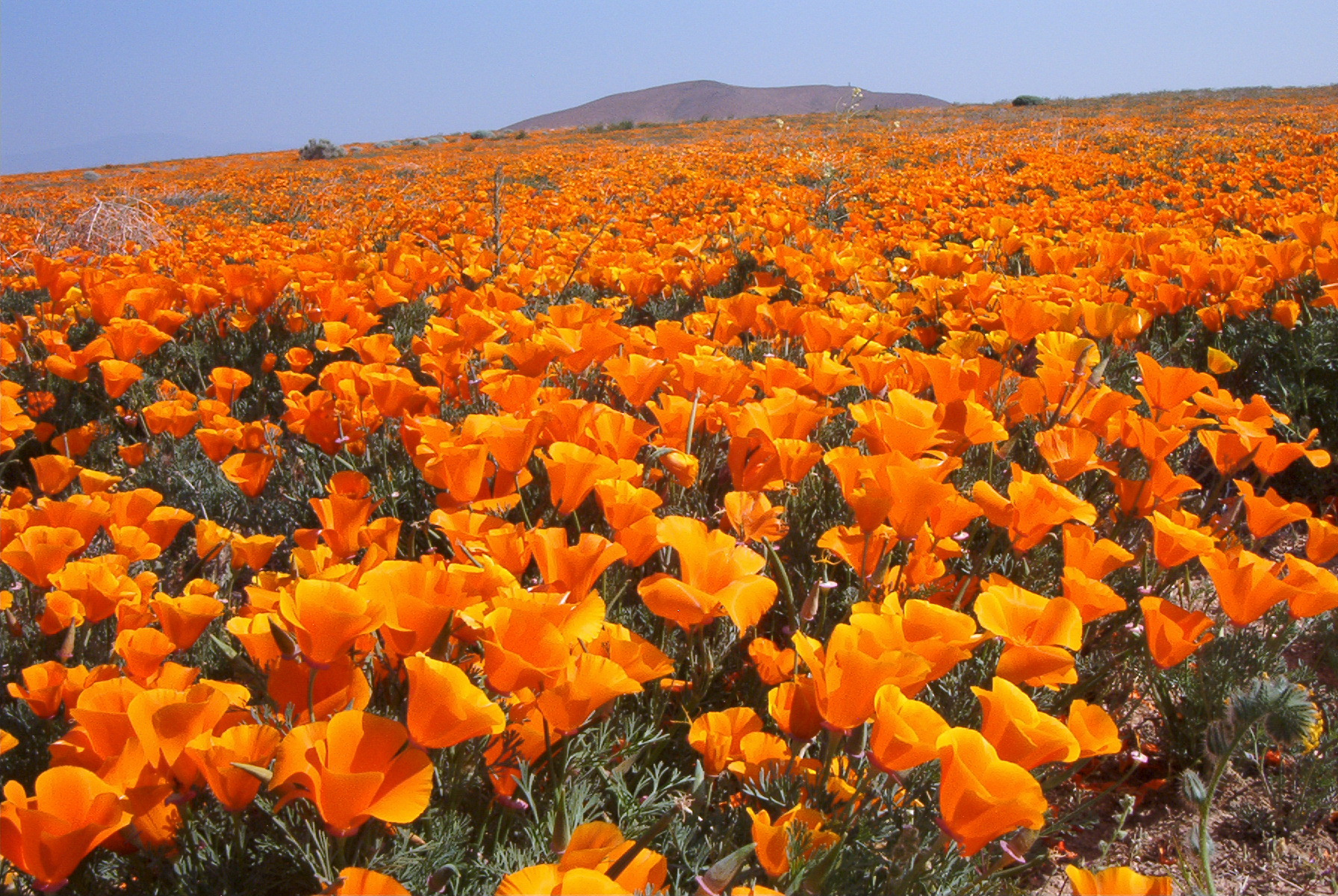
California poppy (Eschscholzia californica) field, at the Antelope Valley California Poppy Reserve.

The vegetation in the Mediterranean California ecoregion is a mixture of grasses and shrubs called chaparral with some oak forests as well. This area is very highly populated and agriculture is prevalent in the valleys. Evergreen trees and shrubs—such as heaths—mainly dominate Mediterranean vegetation with a shrubby to herbaceous understory. Mediterranean vegetation embodies less than 5% of terrestrial ecosystems around the world. A very important aspect of this ecosystem is its frequent wildfires leading to most of its vegetation adapting fire response mechanisms (Vilà and Sardans 1999). Common shrubs within this region are chamise or greasewood (Adenostoma fasciculatum), manzanita (Arctostaphylos spp.), coast sagebrush (Artemisia californica), and California-lilacs (Ceanothus spp.).

Because the climate is so dry and experiences frequent fires, competition is high among plants within this ecoregion. The Mediterranean community found in southern California is said to have a successional stage after wildfires. The fire leaves patches of bare ground which then are quickly filled with newly germinated seeds. Native and introduced herbs persist for the first year following a fire. Shrubs and subshrubs slowly fill in and hit their peak at four to eight years after the fire. Extinctions, unlike many other communities are frequently the cause of environmental extremes rather than competitive invasive species. Human disturbance can increase wildfires with the introduction of grasses such as Bromus rubens which can be readily established in the newly burned, cleared patches. These grasses are more densely compacted and create more fuel for fires. Agricultural grazing can also greatly decrease the chaparral (tangled shrubby brush habitat), which is the home of many native endemic species.

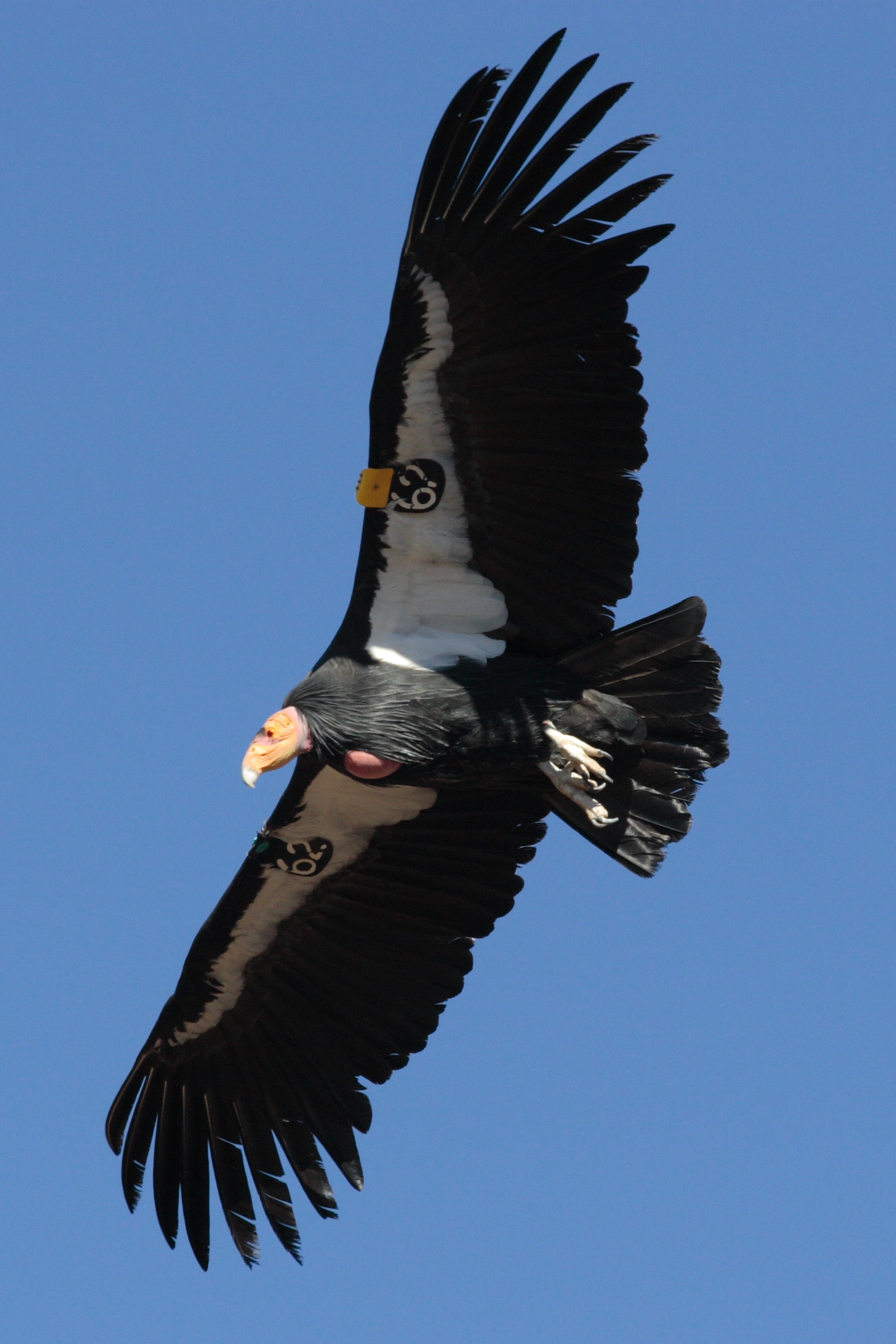
California condor (Gymnogyps californianus) in flight.

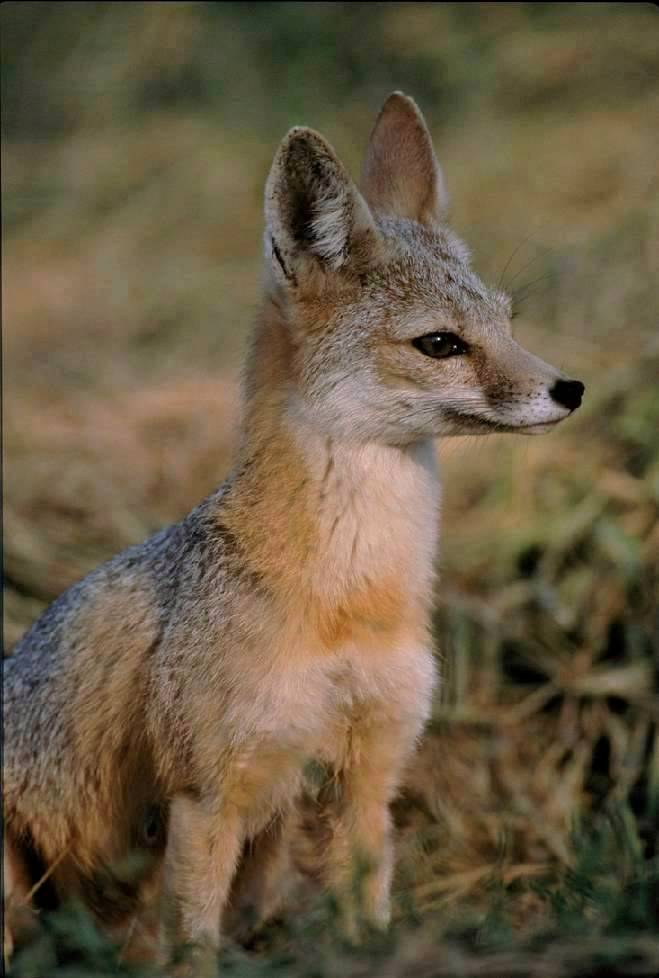
San Joaquin kit fox (Vulpes macrotis subsp. mutica), sitting.

=== Endangered species ===
An endangered species is a species of organisms, either flora or fauna, which face a very high risk of extinction in a proximate time frame, much sooner than the long-term horizon in which species typically persist. There are many species of birds, mammals, reptiles, amphibians and plants that live in the Mediterranean California chaparral and woodlands ecoregion. Yet due to a variety of factors including habitat loss due to the 30 million humans who share the land, some species are endangered.

Endangered, threatened, and vulnerable species of the Mediterranean California chaparral and woodlands ecoregion include:

- Fauna: Bay checkerspot butterfly (Euphydryas editha bayensis), California condor, clapper rail, least tern, least Bell’s vireo, California gnatcatcher, Smith’s blue butterfly, several species of kangaroo rat, Mission blue butterfly (Aricia icarioides missionensis), salt-marsh harvest mouse, San Joaquin kit fox, blunt nosed leopard lizard, San Francisco garter snake, Santa Cruz long- toed salamander, tidewater goby, green sea turtle, southern sea otter, and the Guadalupe fur seal
- Flora: coast redwood (Sequoia sempervirens), giant redwood (Sequoiadendron giganteum), coastal sage scrub oak (Quercus dumosa), Pitkin Marsh lily (Lilium pardalinum subsp. pitkinense), Santa Cruz cypress (Cupressus abramsiana), Southern California black walnut (Juglans californica).

The California condor (Gymnogyps californianus) is one of the most iconic species in the state. With over a 9 feet (2.7 m) wingspan, condors are the largest flying land bird in North America. They are opportunistic scavengers that prey on large dead mammals. The main factors that led to the species endangered status were settlement of the west, shooting, poisoning from lead and DDT, egg collecting, and general habitat degradation. Serious conservation efforts have been made since the 1960s and this severely endangered species has begun a recovery path. A condor recovery program has been started and a wild population is steadily growing.

Another species is the tiny and secretive San Joaquin kit fox (Vulpes macrotis subsp. mutica) is one of the most endangered animals in California. The kit fox is the size of a cat, with big ears, a long bushy tail and furry toes that help to keep it cool in its hot and dry Californian Mediterranean environment. Biologists state that there are fewer than 7,000 San Joaquin kit foxes. San Joaquin kit fox populations rise and fall with the amount of annual rainfall: more rain means more kit foxes. Changes in precipitation patterns, including reduced rainfall and increase changes of drought, all caused by climate change, would affect San Joaquin kit fox populations. The change in the Central Valley from open grasslands to farms, orchards, houses and roads has most affected San Joaquin kit foxes, causing death, illness, injury, difficulty in finding a mate and difficulty in finding food. These kit foxes also are killed and out competed for resources by coyotes and red foxes. Another threat is poison used to kill rats and mice. A recent decision by the federal government to limit to use of these poisons outdoors may keep kit foxes safe.

== Natural resources ==
Humans have used resources of this ecoregion for many years, dating back to early Native Americans. Some traditional resources that are still used today are in danger of being overharvested. These include the Pacific Ocean fisheries, the dwindling timber industry, the rivers flowing from the mountains and the grasslands. All of these resources are either being over harvested or destroyed through agricultural and industrial development. Grasslands hold many native oak trees that are being lost due to overgrazing or forest fires. The overgrazing is attributed to the increasing number of cattle farms while the forest fires come from the use of natural water for human and agricultural use. As more water is used, oak trees lose out without this key component and fires increase due to drying out of the grasslands and forests. The government has tried to install conservation programs to halter the increased use of the land and waterways, but more must be done to create a truly sustainable environment.

Emerging resources from the region are mainly high value agricultural crops. These include stone fruits, sugar beets, rice, nuts, grapes, cotton and specialized cattle systems. Many of these cannot be grown in other parts of the country and thrive in this type of climate. However, because of the dry seasons, these products require large amounts of water as well as varied chemicals and fertilizers to increase production. Many of these farming enterprises are enormous and not sustainable. They leach out chemicals, bring in mass amounts of inputs, and degrade a lot of the land. As with the traditional resources, the government has implemented conservation programs, but only a limited amount.

== Climate change ==
Climate change in the Mediterranean California ecoregion is expected to ultimately have negative effects on the ecosystem and the region's biodiversity. The coast of California is expected to warm by as much as 2 °C in the next 50 years. This is going to cause hotter and drier seasons; the normally wet winters (when a majority of the ecosystem's rain in received) will be drier, and the summers will be especially hotter as well. Increased wildfires will result from the region's warming – mainly in the summer. The shrubbery and trees characteristic of the California chaparral will not fare well in the warmer (and increased fire) region; grasses that are able to regrow asexually or from special off chutes will fare the best. Ultimately the soil quality is going to degrade due to the increased burnings and increased temperatures. Overall, climate change does not bode well for the Mediterranean California ecosystem.

== Environmental threats to the region ==
There are several large threats to this region. Many of California’s large population centers are located within it which causes stress on the surrounding environment because people have a desire to move to California so new homes and industry have to be established in order to accommodate all of the people moving into the region and this requires expansion. Research shows that this eco region is already 20% urban environments and 15% agricultural lands. The research also concluded that population density and urban area has increased by 13% between 1990 and 2000 while agricultural lands in the region have only expanded by 1%. The study conducted also showed direct relationships between the growth of the population and the number of species that were threatened in the area. Expansion will break up the contiguous landscape and move humans closer to the native flora and fauna which will over pressure species that need large open tracts of land to thrive and harm the species diversity of the region. Prevailing winds coming from the west off of the Pacific Ocean all of the pollution created gets carried up to these higher inland sites and causes the species there to suffer with the pollution generated.

The region is also plagued by wildfires. The area is becoming arid species diversity will drop as organisms adapted for dryer climates thrive. No current management plans are in place, a Species refugia to save struggling species that inhabit this region has been proposed by some. Forests similar to these are more resilient to such events due to the spatial arrangement, it would be possible to replicate this in the current forest and make it resilient to the fires that will increase in the near future.

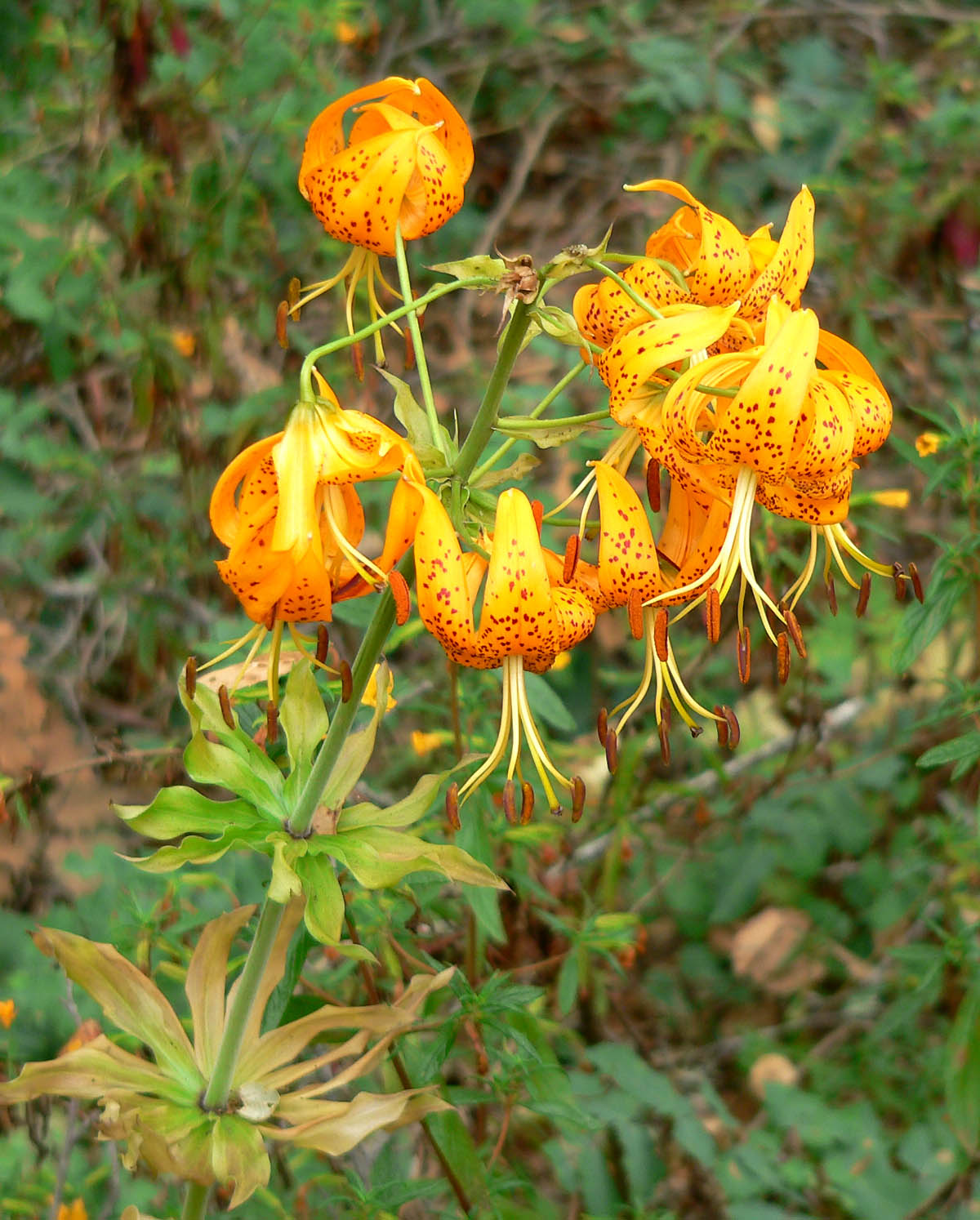
Humboldt lily (Lilium humboldtii), endemic to Southern California.

== See also ==
- Chaparral
- California chaparral and woodlands
- California coastal sage and chaparral ecoregion
- California interior chaparral and woodlands
- California montane chaparral and woodlands
- California oak woodland
- Media related to California chaparral and woodlands at Wikimedia Commons

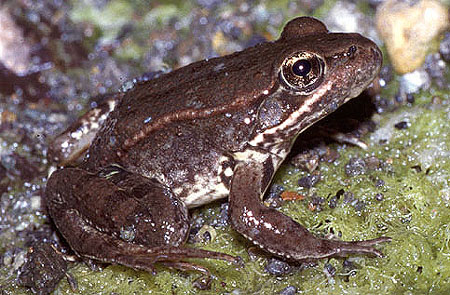
California red-legged frog (Rana draytonii), a vulnerable species.
