= Stearns Wharf =

Pier in Santa Barbara, California, United States

Coordinates: 34°24′38.41″N 119°41′14.50″W

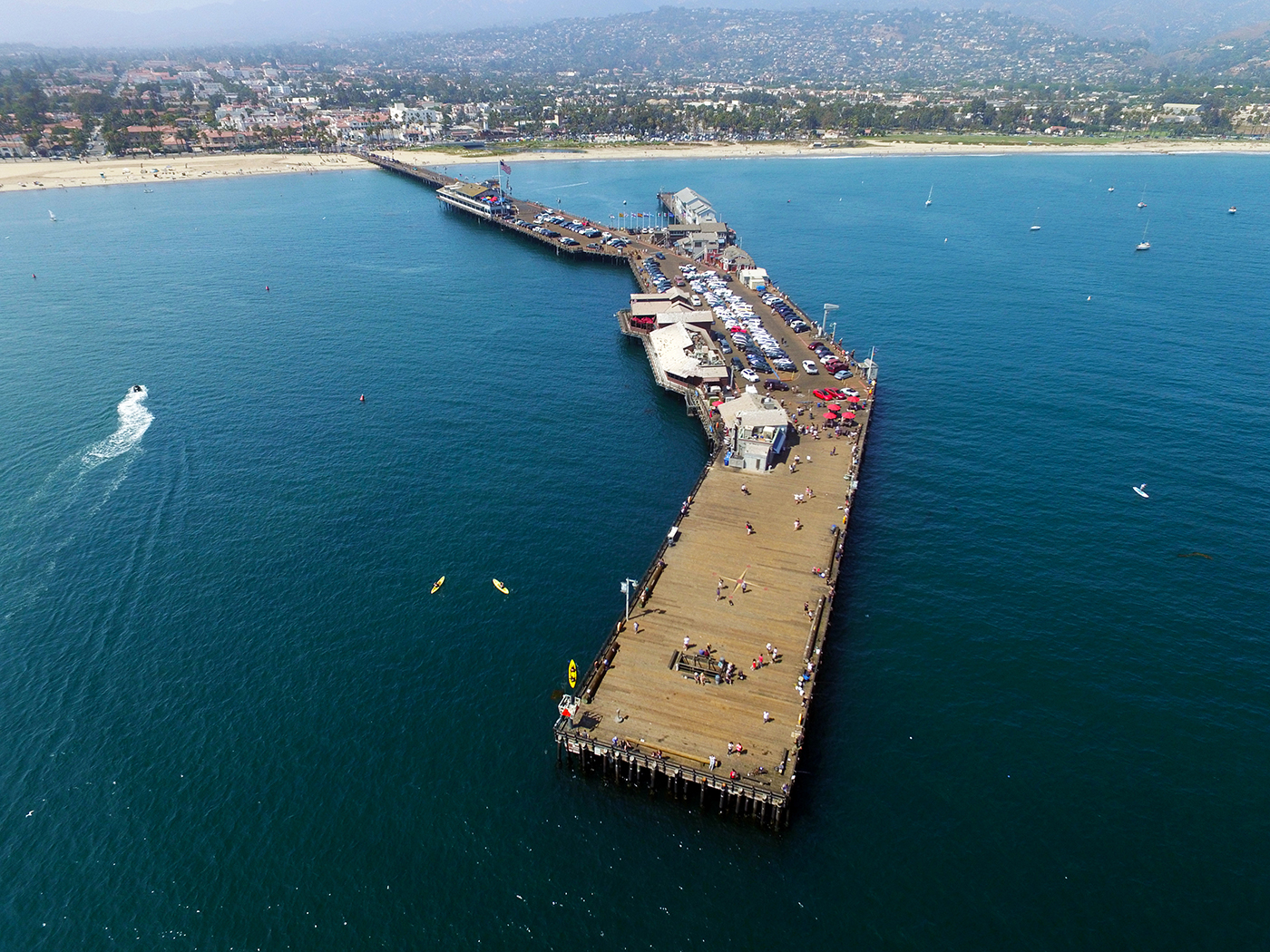
Stearns Wharf

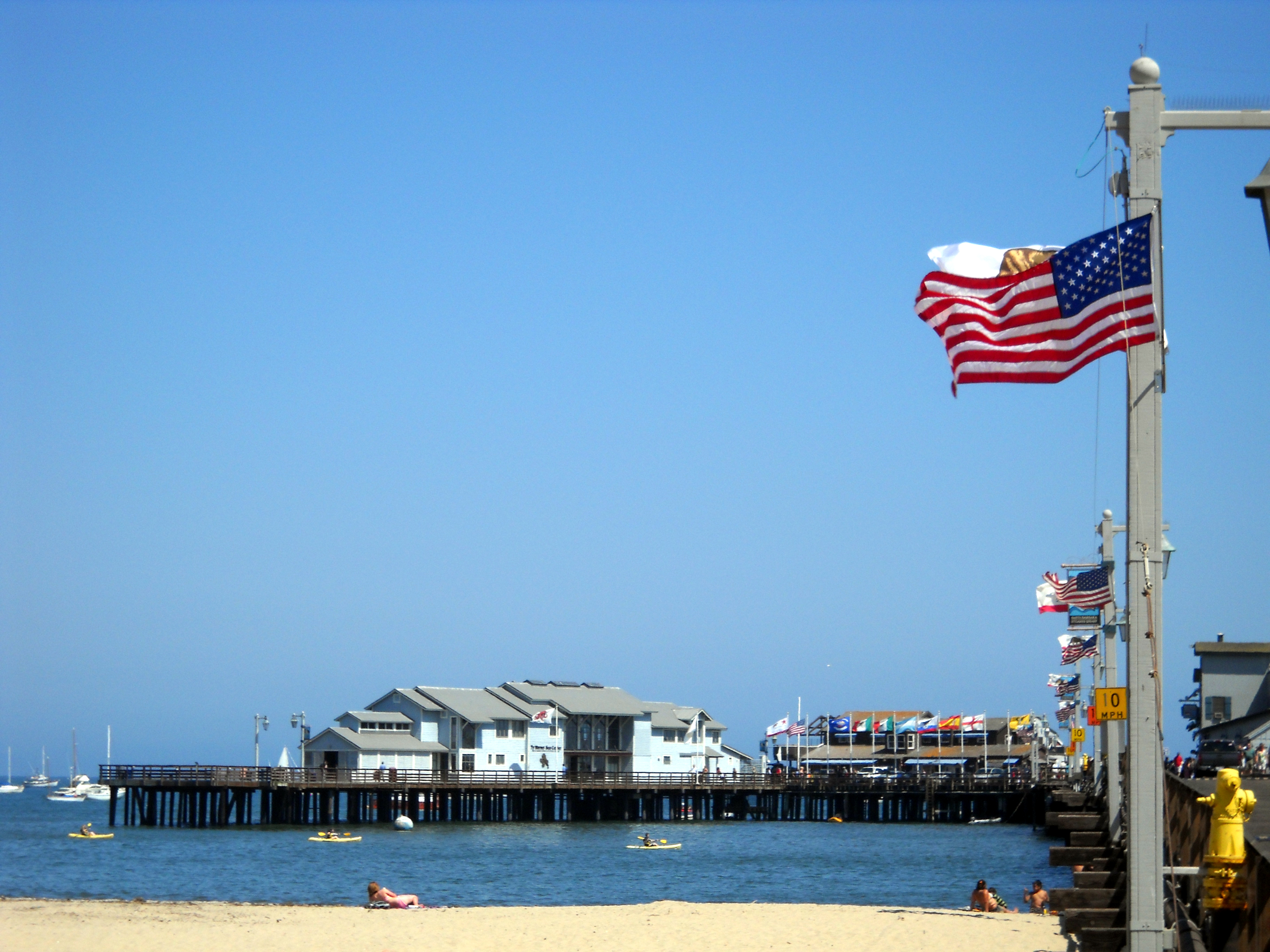
Stearns Wharf

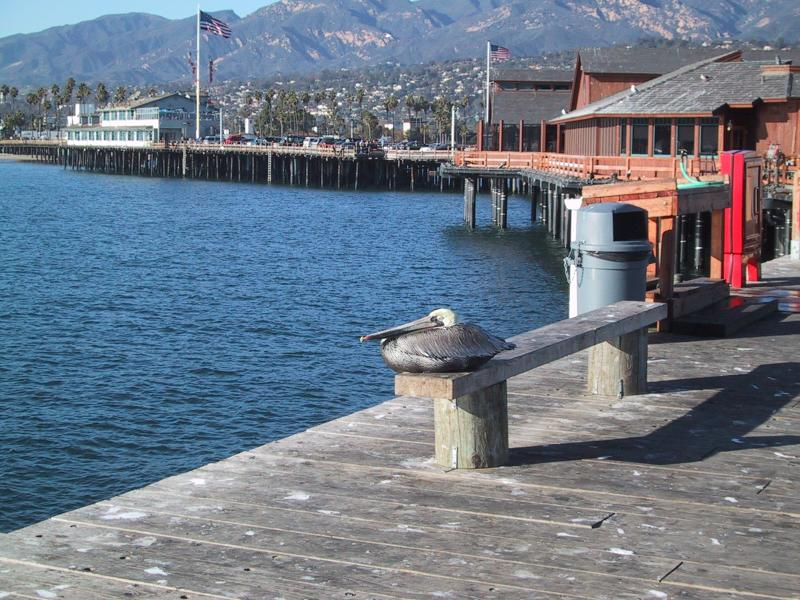
Stearns Wharf

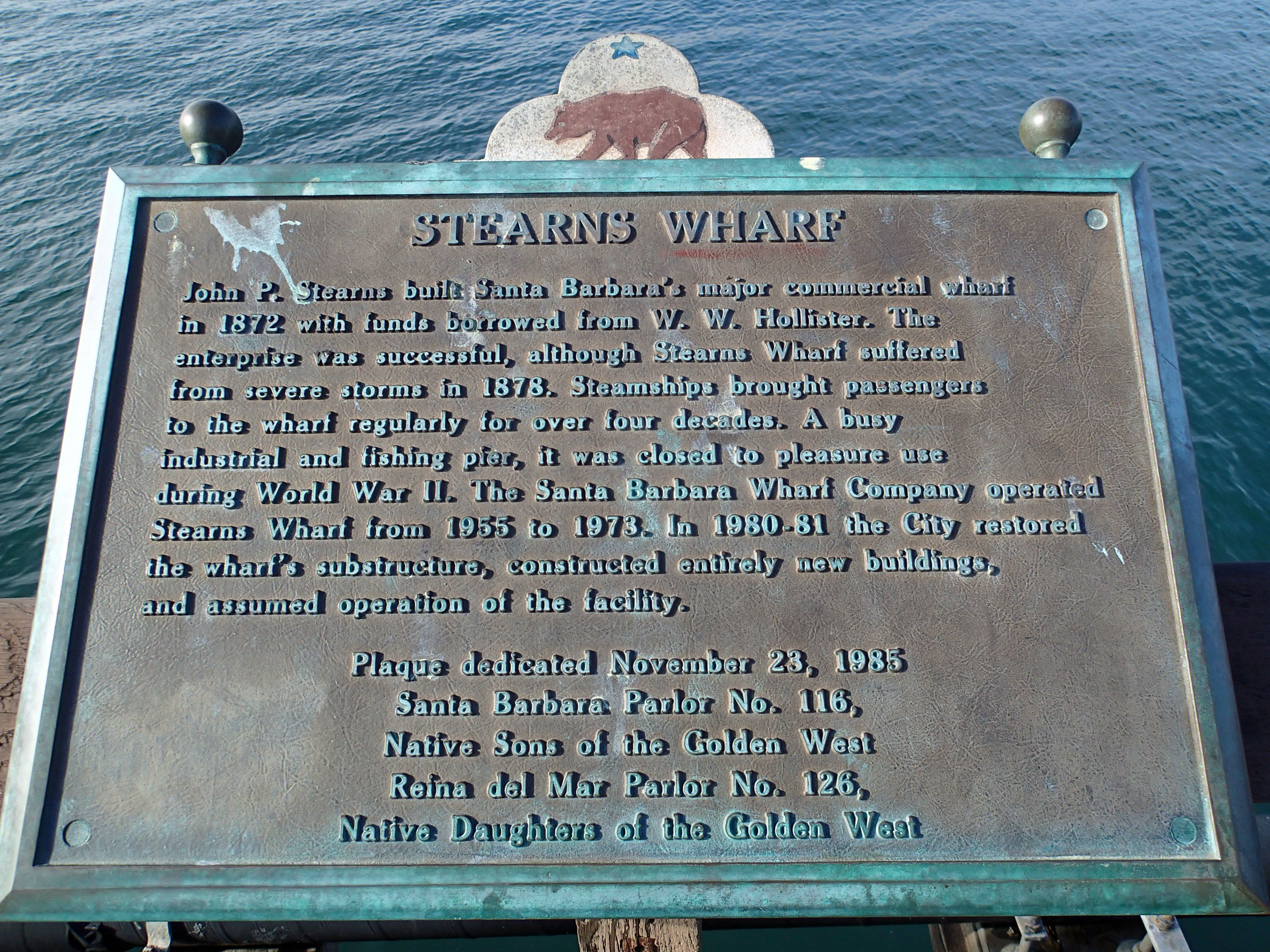
Brass Plaque, Stearns Wharf

Stearns Wharf is a pier at the cross section of the end of State Street and Cabrillo Boulevard, in the harbor in Santa Barbara, California, United States. When completed In 1872, it became the longest deep-water pier between Los Angeles and San Francisco. Named for its builder, local lumberman John Peck Stearns, the wharf served the passenger and freight shipping needs of California's South Coast for over a quarter century. Before the wharf, passengers and cargo had to be rowed ashore through the breakers and kelp. Despite the great convenience offered by the wharf, Santa Barbara remained a fair-weather harbor with an acute need for a breakwater. During December 1878, storms destroyed and washed away more than 1,000 feet of the wharf. Despite these losses, it would be another 52 years before Santa Barbara got its needed breakwater.

When the railroad reached Santa Barbara in 1877, Stearns added another spur to the wharf, providing a necessary transport link to his lumberyard and the nearby Southern Pacific Depot. The spur was damaged by severe storms in the early 20th century and was finally abandoned in 1923.

The Harbor Restaurant was built on the wharf in 1941, marking an end to the shipping and transportation era of the 19th century. The restaurant proved to be the economic backbone of the wharf.

Since its beginning, Stearns Wharf has had several natural and economic disasters, from the big earthquake in 1925 to a fire in 1973 which caused its closing. The wharf stayed closed for six years until restorations were completed in 1981. Another fire in the winter of 1998 devastated the last hundred and fifty feet of the wharf, including Moby Dick Restaurant. Though the rest of the wharf remained open during this period, the rebuilding took over two years. Stearns Wharf stands today as Santa Barbara's most visited landmark.

Currently, there are 17 businesses on the Wharf open to the public including restaurants, museums, souvenir shops, an ice cream parlor, and a candy store. Lil' Toot is a popular water taxi at the wharf that takes passengers to the Santa Barbara Harbor and back on a tour.
