= Paul Bunyan State Forest =

State forest in Minnesota, United States

- Location within Minnesota
- Interactive map of Paul Bunyan State Forest

Geography
- Location: Cass and Hubbard counties, Minnesota, United States
- Coordinates: 47°13′17″N 95°02′38″W
- Elevation: 1,430 feet (440 m)
- Area: 150,113 acres (60,749 ha)

Administration
- Established: 1935
- Authority: Minnesota DNR, Hubbard County
- Website: www.dnr.state.mn.us/state_forests/sft00038/index.html

Ecology
- WWF Classification: Western Great Lakes Forests
- EPA Classification: Northern Lakes and Forests

The Paul Bunyan State Forest is a state forest located in Hubbard and Cass counties in Minnesota. The forest borders the Chippewa National Forest and the Welsh Lake State Forest to the east, and the Mississippi Headwaters State Forest to the northwest. The forest is managed by the Minnesota Department of Natural Resources and the land department for Hubbard County.

== History and overview ==
The establishment of a sawmill on the eleventh lake of the Crow Wing Chain of Lakes near Akeley by the Red River Lumber Company in 1898 led to the systematic logging of the old-growth red pine and eastern white pine which covered the land in the early twentieth century. By 1908, there were eight to ten logging camps in the area, which led to the construction of a railroad which extended to Lake Alice Township and further logging, which ceased in 1915 when the Red River Lumber Company moved to California. Many of the present-day recreational trails in the forest are old railroad beds.

Aspen species became the dominant forest cover following a series of wildfires between 1913 and 1926, which nearly eliminated the remaining red and eastern white pine. Today, around 82% of the forest is aspen, 10% is red, eastern white, and jack pine, with the remaining 8% a mix of northern hardwoods. Foresters are currently working on harvesting mature aspen in order to reinstate pine in the forest.

== Recreation ==
Popular outdoor recreational activities in the forest include dispersed camping. Trails are designated for such varied uses such as mountain biking, with 18 miles (29 km) specifically for hiking, 37 miles (60 km) for Class I and II all-terrain vehicle use, and 87 miles (140 km) for off-highway motorcycling. In the wintertime, trails are designated for cross-country skiing and 60 miles (97 km) are set aside for snowmobiling. The Paul Bunyan State Trail, the Heartland State Trail, and the North Country National Scenic Trail all pass through the forest.

== See also ==
- List of Minnesota state forests
