= Lyons State Forest =

State Forest in Wadena County, Minnesota

- Location within Minnesota
- Interactive map of Lyons State Forest

Geography
- Location: Wadena County, Minnesota, United States
- Coordinates: 46°33′13″N 94°47′31″W
- Elevation: 1,289 feet (393 m)
- Area: 14,789 acres (5,985 ha)

Administration
- Established: 1963
- Authority: Minnesota DNR
- Website: www.dnr.state.mn.us/state_forests/sft00032/index.html

Ecology
- WWF Classification: Western Great Lakes Forests
- EPA Classification: Northern Lakes and Forests
- Disturbance: Wildfire
- Dominant tree species: Pinus banksiana Populus tremuloides Betula papyrifera

The Lyons State Forest is a state forest located near the city of Staples in Wadena County, Minnesota. The forest is managed by the Minnesota Department of Natural Resources.

== History and overview ==
The forest and surrounding area of the Crow Wing River valley were originally inhabited by the Eastern Dakota and Ojibwe people. European exploration began as a result of the fur trade by the French in the early 18th century, and subsequently the Canadian and British in the 1760s. The old-growth forests were logged extensively between 1870 and the early 20th century; the lumber industry in the area declined rapidly after the depletion of the mature forests. Wildfires historically occurred every 10 to 40 years, which explains the dominance of Jack Pine, Aspen, and Paper Birch in the forest, although stands of Eastern White and Red Pine also occur. The topographical features of the forest, such as terminal moraines, outwash plains, till plains, and drumlin fields, as well as the sandy loam soil texture, were caused by the Wisconsinan glaciation.

== Recreation ==
Popular outdoor recreational activities are hunting and dispersed camping. Trails are designated for hiking, with 2.3 miles (3.7 km) designated for Class I all-terrain vehicle and off-road motorcycling use.

== See also ==
- List of Minnesota state forests
