= Northwest Angle State Forest =

State Forest in Lake of the Woods County, Minnesota

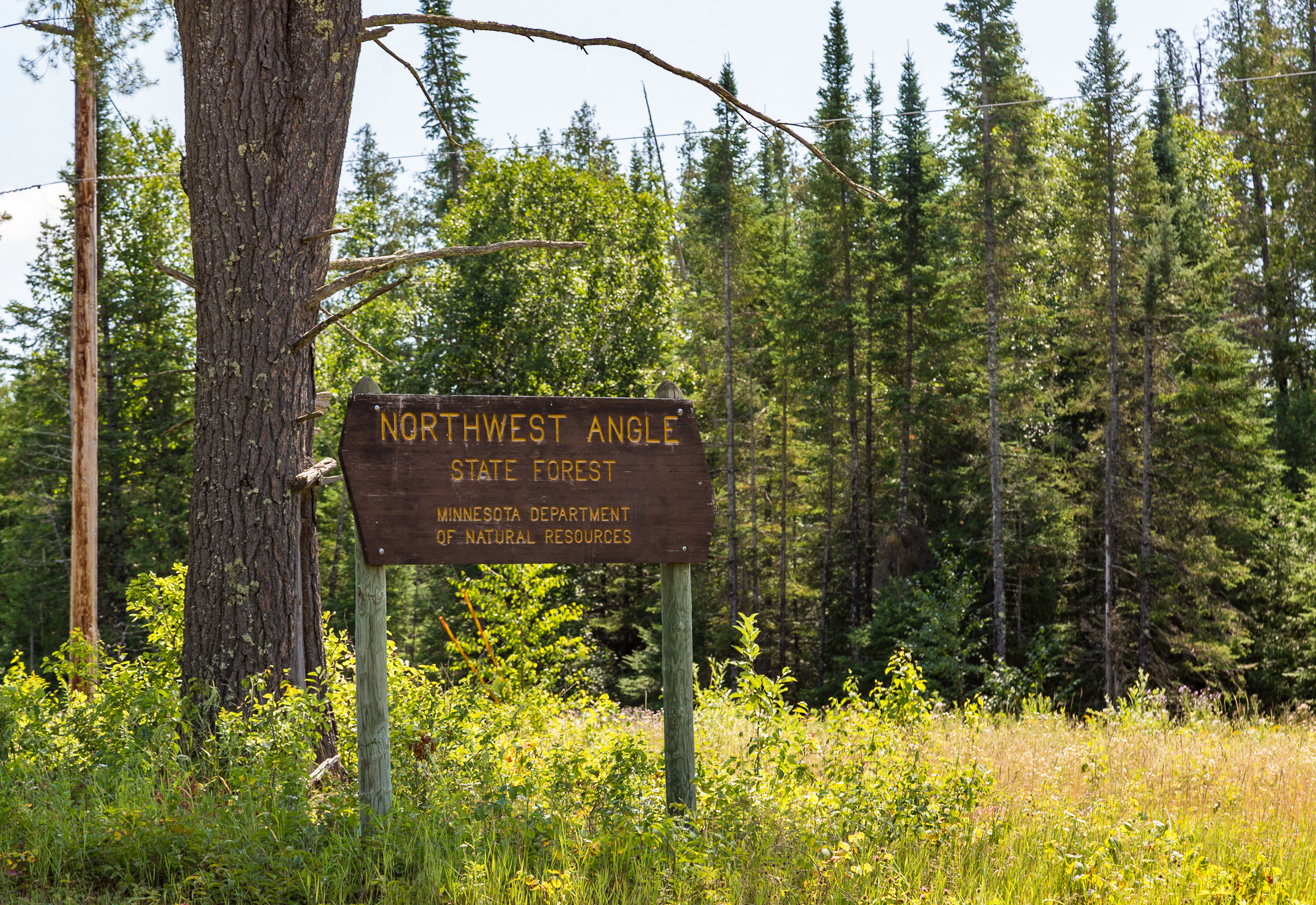
- Northwest Angle State Forest, July 2017

- Location within Minnesota

Geography
- Location: Lake of the Woods County, Minnesota, United States
- Coordinates: 49°18′40″N 94°56′29″W
- Elevation: 1,083 feet (330 m)
- Area: 144,412 acres (58,441 ha)

Administration
- Established: 1935
- Authority: Minnesota DNR
- Website: www.dnr.state.mn.us/state_forests/sft00036/index.html

Ecology
- WWF Classification: Western Great Lakes Forests
- EPA Classification: Northern Lakes and Forests

The Northwest Angle State Forest is a state forest located in Lake of the Woods County, Minnesota, United States. The name of the forest is derived from its location near the Northwest Angle, the northernmost point of the contiguous United States, which is also an exclave. The forest borders the Canadian provinces of Manitoba and Ontario, and the Red Lake Indian Reservation. The forest is managed by the Minnesota Department of Natural Resources.

Tree species of the forest are Tamarack, Black Spruce, Eastern White Pine, Red Pine, Northern Whitecedar, and Paper Birch. Popular outdoor recreational activities are hunting, fishing and boating on Lake of the Woods, birdwatching, and dispersed camping. Trails are designated for hiking; all motorized recreation is prohibited, with the exception of snowmobiling in the wintertime.

== See also ==
- List of Minnesota state forests
- Northwest Angle
- Lake of the Woods
- Garden Island State Recreation Area
- Fort Saint Charles
- Angle Inlet, Minnesota
- Penasse, Minnesota
- Red Lake Indian Reservation
