= Lost River State Forest =

State forest in Roseau County, Minnesota

- Location within Minnesota
- Interactive map of Lost River State Forest

Geography
- Location: Roseau County, Minnesota, United States
- Coordinates: 48°59′00″N 95°39′00″W
- Elevation: 1,060 feet (320 m)
- Area: 54,915 acres (22,223 ha)

Administration
- Established: 1963
- Authority: Minnesota DNR
- Website: www.dnr.state.mn.us/state_forests/sft00057/index.html

Ecology
- WWF Classification: Western Great Lakes Forests
- EPA Classification: Northern Lakes and Forests

The Lost River State Forest is a state forest located in Roseau County, Minnesota, United States. The forest borders the Canadian province of Manitoba to the north, and parcels belonging to the Red Lake Indian Reservation are within the forest's boundaries. The forest is managed by the Minnesota Department of Natural Resources.

The forest is known for its excellent birdwatching. Avian species within the forest include the great grey owl, spruce grouse, snowy owl, northern hawk owl, and northern saw-whet owl, whip-poor-will, American three-toed woodpecker, black-backed woodpecker; yellow-bellied flycatcher, common raven, boreal chickadee, and magnolia warbler. Outdoor recreation opportunities in the forest include dispersed camping, hunting and trails are designated for hiking and snowmobiling.

== See also ==
- List of Minnesota state forests
