= Pillsbury State Forest =

State forest in Minnesota, United States

- Location within Minnesota
- Interactive map of Pillsbury State Forest

Geography
- Location: Cass County, Minnesota, United States
- Coordinates: 46°25′10″N 94°26′06″W
- Elevation: 1,358 feet (414 m)
- Area: 25,612 acres (10,365 ha)

Administration
- Established: 1900
- Authority: Minnesota DNR
- Website: www.dnr.state.mn.us/state_forests/sft00039/index.html

Ecology
- WWF Classification: Western Great Lakes Forests
- EPA Classification: Northern Lakes and Forests
- Lesser flora: Cypripedium parviflorum

The Pillsbury State Forest is a state forest located in Cass County, Minnesota. Created in 1900, it was the first designated Minnesota state forests. The forest borders Gull Lake and the city of Lake Shore to the north. The forest is managed by the Minnesota Department of Natural Resources. The name of the forest is derived from John S. Pillsbury, the former Governor of Minnesota, who donated the original 1,000 acres (4.0 km^{2}) of land that became the state forest.

== History and overview ==
Millions of board feet of old-growth eastern white pine and red pine were harvested in the area in the late 19th century, with the intention of turning the land into farmsteads. Many farms were abandoned when the land turned out to be unsuitable for agriculture. Nowadays, northern hardwoods are the dominant tree species in the forest, although eastern white pine, red pine, tamarack, balsam fir, and white spruce can be found. 43 acres (17 ha) of red pine and 37 acres (15 ha) of oak in the forest are designated as old-growth and are exempt from harvesting.

== Wildlife ==
Wildlife is abundant in the forest. Mammals such as white-tailed deer, American black bears, gray wolves, and eastern gray squirrels are common. Bird species in the forest include the red-shouldered hawk, ruffed grouse bald eagles, ospreys, and waterfowl (including mallards and wood ducks); rookeries of the great blue heron also are present in the forest, as are wild turkeys who have migrated from nearby Camp Ripley.

== Recreation ==
Popular outdoor recreational activities in the forest are largely centered on the abundance of waterbodies in the forest, and include swimming, fishing, canoeing, kayaking, and boating. Trails are designated for a variety of uses, and include 27 miles (43 km) set aside for mountain biking and horseback riding, and 1.2 miles (1.9 km) specifically for hiking. In the wintertime, 3 miles (4.8 km) are designated for cross-country skiing.

== See also ==
- List of Minnesota state forests
