= Mississippi Headwaters State Forest =

State Forest in Beltrami, Clearwater and Hubbard counties, Minnesota

- Location within Minnesota

Geography
- Location: Beltrami, Clearwater, and Hubbard counties, Minnesota, United States
- Coordinates: 47°26′16″N 95°03′30″W
- Elevation: 1,358 feet (414 m)
- Area: 45,290 acres (18,330 ha)

Administration
- Established: 1935
- Authority: Counties, Minnesota DNR
- Website: www.dnr.state.mn.us/state_forests/sft00034/index.html

Ecology
- WWF Classification: Western Great Lakes Forests
- EPA Classification: Northern Lakes and Forests

The Mississippi Headwaters State Forest is a state forest located near the town of Wilton in Beltrami County, Minnesota. Portions of the forest extend into the neighboring counties of Clearwater and Hubbard. The majority of the forest is managed by the respective counties, with the Minnesota Department of Natural Resources managing around 9,000 acres (3,600 ha). The forest is named after its location immediately downstream (north) of Lake Itasca, the headwaters of the Mississippi River.

The topography of the region, such as hills and flat outwash plains, are a result of the Wisconsinan glaciation. The sandy soil of the moraines are dominated by Eastern White Pine, Red Pine, oaks, maples, birch, and aspen; Black Spruce, Northern Whitecedar, and Tamarack are also present on the wet peat-like soils of the forest.

Popular outdoor recreational activities available revolve around the river and the 95 lakes and ponds within the forest, and include boating, canoeing, kayaking, and swimming. Trails are designated for hunting and dispersed camping. Trails are designated for hiking, mountain biking, and snowmobiling in the wintertime.

== See also ==
- List of Minnesota state forests
- Mississippi River
- Itasca State Park
