= Lake of the Woods State Forest =

State forest in Minnesota, United States

- Location within Minnesota

Geography
- Location: Beltrami, Koochiching, Lake of the Woods, and Roseau counties, Minnesota, United States
- Coordinates: 48°48′54″N 94°42′20″W
- Elevation: 1,076 feet (328 m)
- Area: 142,331 acres (57,599 ha)

Administration
- Established: 1990
- Authority: Minnesota Department of Natural Resources
- Website: www.dnr.state.mn.us/state_forests/sft00058/index.html

Ecology
- WWF Classification: Western Great Lakes Forests
- EPA Classification: Northern Lakes and Forests

The Lake of the Woods State Forest is a state forest located south of Lake of the Woods in Beltrami, Koochiching, Lake of the Woods and Roseau counties in Minnesota, USA. The forest borders the Pine Island State Forest to the east and the Beltrami Island State Forest to the west.

Outdoor recreational activities include boating, canoeing, kayaking and fishing. Hunting for small game and white-tailed deer is popular in the fall and trails are designated for snowmobiling in the winter. Camping facilities are available at Beltrami Island State Forest and the nearby Zippel Bay State Park.

== See also ==
- List of Minnesota state forests
