= Golden Anniversary State Forest =

State Forest in Itasca County, Minnesota

- Location within Minnesota Location within the United States
- Interactive map of Golden Anniversary State Forest

Geography
- Location: Itasca County, Minnesota, United States
- Coordinates: 47°03′46″N 93°16′16″W
- Elevation: 1,280 feet (390 m)
- Area: 6,811 acres (2,756 ha)

Administration
- Established: 1961
- Authority: Minnesota DNR, Itasca County, private
- Website: www.dnr.state.mn.us/state_forests/sft00022/index.html

Ecology
- WWF Classification: Western Great Lakes Forests
- EPA Classification: Northern Lakes and Forests
- Fauna: White-tailed deer

The Golden Anniversary State Forest is a state forest located near Grand Rapids in southern Itasca County, Minnesota. The forest was established in 1961 in celebration of the golden anniversary of the Minnesota Department of Natural Resources's Division of Forestry, which is responsible for the management of the majority of the state forests in Minnesota.

== Flora and fauna ==
An abundance of wildlife is present in the forest with its variety of tree species, namely aspen, Northern Whitecedar, northern hardwoods, White Spruce, Balsam Fir, Red Pine, and Eastern White Pine. Management efforts in the forest are currently working towards creating more habitat for Ruffed Grouse. White-tailed deer are common in the forest and have established a deer yard near Cowhorn Lake, where waterfowl species are also present.

== Recreation ==
Outdoor recreational activities include hunting, picnicking, and backcountry camping. A boat launch makes Cowhorn Lake accessible for fishing, as well as swimming. Trails include 7 miles (11 km) designated for cross-country skiing, of which 5.5 miles (8.9 km) are open for mountain biking in the summertime.

== See also ==
- List of Minnesota state forests
