= D.A.R. State Forest (Minnesota) =

State Forest in Pine County, Minnesota

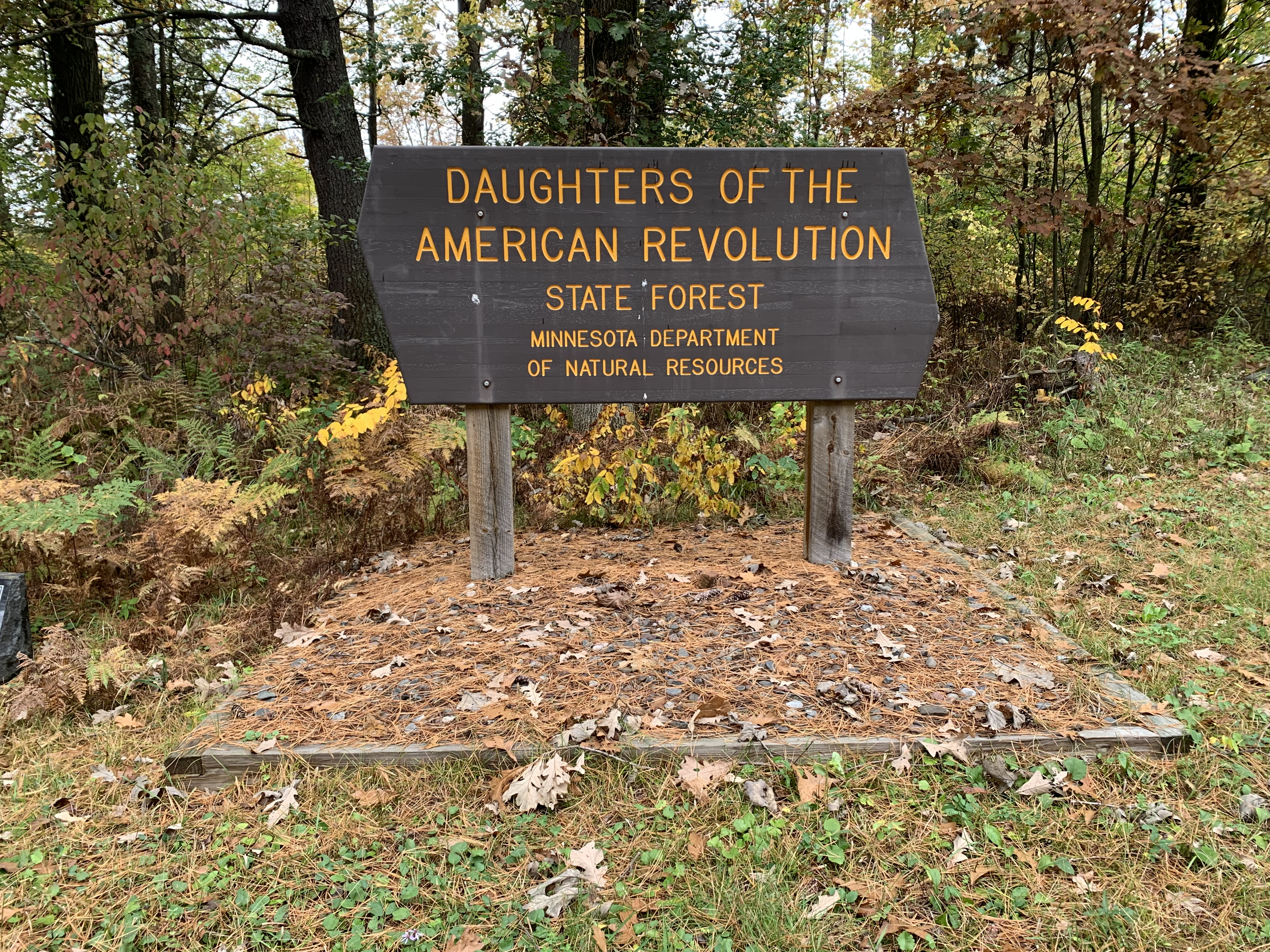
- D.A.R. State Forest sign

- Location within Minnesota
- Interactive map of D.A.R. State Forest

Geography
- Location: Pine County, Minnesota, United States
- Coordinates: 46°12′30″N 92°44′56″W
- Elevation: 1,181 ft (360 m)
- Area: 643 acres (260 ha)

Administration
- Established: 1943
- Authority: Minnesota Department of Natural Resources,
- Website: www.dnr.state.mn.us/state_forests/sft00015/index.html

Ecology
- WWF Classification: Western Great Lakes Forests
- EPA Classification: Northern Lakes and Forests

The D.A.R. State Forest is a state forest located in Pine County, Minnesota. It is named after the Daughters of the American Revolution and is located east of Banning State Park. There are no facilities in the forest established for outdoor recreation activities, including hiking. Visitors are recommended to stay at nearby Banning State Park, Nemadji State Forest, or General C. C. Andrews State Forest.

== See also ==
- List of Minnesota state forests
