= Blackduck State Forest =

State forest in Minnesota, United States

- Location within Minnesota
- Interactive map of Blackduck State Forest

Geography
- Location: Beltrami and Itasca counties, Minnesota, United States
- Coordinates: 47°38′32″N 94°20′23″W
- Area: 125,529 acres (50,800 ha)

Administration
- Established: 1935
- Authority: Minnesota Department of Natural Resources, Counties
- Website: www.dnr.state.mn.us/state_forests/sft00008/index.html

Ecology
- WWF Classification: Western Great Lakes forests
- EPA Classification: Northern Lakes and Forests

The Blackduck State Forest is a state forest near the town of Blackduck, located in Beltrami and Itasca counties in Minnesota. It is adjacent to the Buena Vista State Forest and the federally managed Chippewa National Forest. It is managed primarily by the Minnesota Department of Natural Resources and the counties.

The landscape is hilly and mixed soils are a result of the area's glacial history. Aspen and northern hardwoods dominate the upland sites, and black spruce, tamarack, and northern white cedar cover lowland sites.

Outdoor recreation opportunities include cross-country skiing, snowmobiling and hiking trails. Hunting and picnicking sites are located through the forest, and there is boating access to the Chippewa Forest's waters.

== See also ==
- List of Minnesota state forests
