= Red Lake State Forest =

State forest in Minnesota, United States

- Location within Minnesota
- Interactive map of Red Lake State Forest

Geography
- Location: Koochiching and Beltrami counties, Minnesota, United States
- Coordinates: 48°02′08″N 94°33′19″W
- Elevation: 1,227 feet (374 m)
- Area: 84,105 acres (34,036 ha)

Administration
- Established: 1963
- Authority: Minnesota DNR
- Website: www.dnr.state.mn.us/state_forests/sft00041/index.html

Ecology
- WWF Classification: Western Great Lakes Forests
- EPA Classification: Northern Lakes and Forests

The Red Lake State Forest is a Minnesota state forest located primarily in Beltrami County, although portions extend into Koochiching County. The forest borders the Pine Island State Forest to the east and Upper Red Lake to the west. Minnesota State Highway 72 runs through the forest.

The location of Lake Agassiz in the area led to the flat topography of the forest, which is dotted with wetlands and bogs, a sandy loam is throughout. The vast expanses of old-growth northern whitecedar and pine were extensively logged in the early 20th century. The landscape is now dominated by black spruce, tamarack, and northern whitecedar in the lowlands; aspen, pine, and balsam fir predominate in upland sites.

== Recreation ==
Popular outdoor recreational activities in the forest include fishing and hunting. Trails are designated for hiking, as well as snowmobiling in the wintertime. Camping is available at a campground near the town of Waskish and throughout the forest in the form of dispersed camping

== See also ==
- List of Minnesota state forests
