= Foot Hills State Forest =

State Forest in Cass and Hubbard counties, Minnesota

- Location within Minnesota
- Interactive map of Foot Hills State Forest

Geography
- Location: Cass and Hubbard counties, Minnesota, United States
- Coordinates: 46°45′42″N 94°35′30″W
- Elevation: 1,450 feet (440 m)
- Area: 46,896 acres (18,978 ha)

Administration
- Established: 1931
- Authority: Minnesota DNR (40%); Cass County (25%); Private (35%)
- Website: www.dnr.state.mn.us/state_forests/sft00019/index.html

Ecology
- WWF Classification: Western Great Lakes Forests
- EPA Classification: Northern Lakes and Forests
- Dominant tree species: Northern hardwoods
- Fauna: Red-shouldered hawk

The Foot Hills State Forest is a state forest located in Cass and Hubbard counties, Minnesota. The forest is a popular recreation spot due to its proximity to the greater Minneapolis – Saint Paul metropolitan area.

== History and overview ==
At the turn of the twentieth century the land where the forest is now located, along with the majority of Minnesota, was logged and opened to homesteading, however the area proved to be unsuitable for agriculture. Many homesteads were abandoned after the old-growth forests were logged and the logging companies ceased the upkeep of their railroads, making the homesteads isolated. With the elimination of the red pine and eastern white pine that originally dominated the landscape, secondary successional species such as the northern hardwoods (aspen, red maple, paper birch, and sugar maple), red oak, and bur oak, established and are now the principal tree species in the forest. Although the species are no longer common in the forest, 36 acres (15 ha) of red pine and 30 acres (12 ha) of black ash are designated old-growth and are exempt from harvesting.

== Recreation ==
The hundreds of small lakes and potholes in the forest, formed during the Wisconsin glaciation, make boating, swimming, canoeing, and kayaking popular recreation activities. They also make the forest an attraction for many bird and waterfowl species. Rookeries for the great blue heron are present in the forest, as are mallards and wood ducks. North American beavers also use the abundance of aspen in the forest to build dens.

Other outdoor recreational activities include hiking and mountain biking on provided trails, as well as backcountry camping. Trails include 40 miles (64 km) available for Class I and II all-terrain vehicle use as well as dirt biking, and 11 miles (18 km) designated for other off-road vehicles. 8.6 miles (13.8 km) are also designated for cross-country skiing.

== See also ==
- List of Minnesota state forests
