= Insula Lake State Forest =

State Forest in Lake County, Minnesota

- Location within Minnesota
- Interactive map of Insula Lake State Forest

Geography
- Location: Fall Lake Township, Lake County, Minnesota, United States
- Coordinates: 47°53′40″N 91°17′10″W
- Elevation: 1,535 feet (468 m)
- Area: 609 acres (246 ha)

Administration
- Established: 1963
- Authority: United States Forest Service
- Website: www.dnr.state.mn.us/state_forests/sft00026/index.html

Ecology
- WWF Classification: Western Great Lakes Forests
- EPA Classification: Northern Lakes and Forests

The Insula Lake State Forest is a state forest located in Lake County, Minnesota. The forest is entirely within the limits of the Boundary Waters Canoe Area Wilderness of the Superior National Forest, and as such falls under the jurisdiction and management of the United States Forest Service.

In addition to canoeing, popular outdoor recreational activities include hunting and fishing.

== See also ==
- List of Minnesota state forests
