= Jeanette State Forest =

State Forest in St. Louis County, Minnesota

- Location within Minnesota
- Interactive map of Jeanette State Forest

Geography
- Location: St. Louis County, Minnesota, United States
- Coordinates: 48°07′58″N 92°16′51″W
- Elevation: 1,381 feet (421 m)
- Area: 11,521 acres (4,662 ha)

Administration
- Established: 1963
- Authority: United States Forest Service
- Website: www.dnr.state.mn.us/state_forests/sft00030/index.html

Ecology
- WWF Classification: Western Great Lakes Forests
- EPA Classification: Northern Lakes and Forests

The Jeanette State Forest is a state forest located in St. Louis County, Minnesota. The forest is within the limits of the Superior National Forest's Boundary Waters Canoe Area Wilderness, and thus falls under the federal jurisdiction and management of the United States Forest Service.

Camping is available in the Superior National Forest at the Lake Jeanette Campground. Originally built by the Civilian Conservation Corps in the 1930s, the campground is located in a stand of pine and northern hardwoods overlooking Lake Jeanette.

== See also ==
- List of Minnesota state forests
