= Fond du Lac State Forest =

State Forest in St. Louis and Carlton counties, Minnesota

- Location within Minnesota
- Interactive map of Fond du Lac State Forest

Geography
- Location: Saint Louis and Carlton counties, Minnesota, United States
- Coordinates: 46°40′37″N 92°47′33″W
- Area: 64,505 acres (26,104 ha)

Administration
- Established: 1933
- Events: 1918 Cloquet Fire
- Authority: Minnesota Department of Natural Resources (70%), County, Corporate, Private (30%)
- Website: www.dnr.state.mn.us/state_forests/sft00018/index.html

Ecology
- WWF Classification: Western Great Lakes forests
- EPA Classification: Northern Lakes and Forests
- Disturbance: Wildfire

The Fond du Lac State Forest is a state forest in Minnesota, United States, principally managed by the Minnesota Department of Natural Resources (MDNR). The main segment of the forest is located between the towns of Sawyer and Cromwell, in Carlton County. The boundaries of the forest overlap with those of the Fond du Lac Indian Reservation, some state forest land falls within the reservation. The Kettle Lake Wildlife Management Area (also managed by the MDNR) is located in the southern half of the main segment. A smaller segment is located adjacent to Jay Cooke State Park and the border with Wisconsin in Saint Louis County.

== Overview and history ==
The forest is a mixture of coniferous boreal forest, alder-willow brushlands, lowland bogs, and wild rice (Zizania palustris) laden lakes. The current forest cover was largely influenced by the 1918 Cloquet Fire and the controlled burns that took place until the 1930s, as well as the drainage of area lowlands from 1916 to 1920 for the purposes of homesteading.

== Recreation ==
Outdoor recreation opportunities in the forest include camping and hiking throughout the forest, canoeing, kayaking, and swimming on the numerous lakes, as well as picnicking at picnic shelters. Trails located throughout the forest include 18.3 miles (29.5 km) designated for cross-country skiing, 33 miles (53 km) for mountain biking, 40 miles (64 km) each for Class I and Class II All-terrain vehicle (ATV) use, 40 miles (64 km) for off-highway motorcycling, as well as snowmobiling.

== See also ==
- List of Minnesota state forests
