= Pat Bayle State Forest =

State Forest in Cook County, Minnesota

- Location within Minnesota
- Interactive map of Pat Bayle State Forest

Geography
- Location: Cook County, Minnesota, United States
- Coordinates: 47°50′16″N 90°34′06″W
- Area: 180,403 acres (73,007 ha)

Administration
- Established: 1963
- Authority: United States Forest Service
- Website: www.dnr.state.mn.us/state_forests/sft00037/index.html

Ecology
- WWF Classification: Western Great Lakes Forests
- EPA Classification: Northern Lakes and Forests
- Disturbance: Wildfire

The Pat Bayle State Forest is a state forest located near the town of Grand Marais in Cook County, Minnesota. The forest falls within the limits of the Superior National Forest, and falls under the federal jurisdiction of the United States Forest Service.

Within the forest one can find the highest point of elevation in the state of Minnesota, Eagle Mountain. In addition to hiking, winter outdoor recreational activities are popular, including snowmobiling, snowshoeing, dog sledding, and ice-fishing.

== See also ==
- List of Minnesota state forests
