= Beltrami Island State Forest =

State forest in Minnesota, United States

- Location within Minnesota
- Interactive map of Beltrami Island State Forest

Geography
- Location: Lake of the Woods, Roseau, and Beltrami counties, Minnesota, United States
- Coordinates: 48°41′49″N 95°19′45″W
- Area: 703,366 acres (284,642 ha)

Administration
- Established: 1933
- Visitation: 2064
- Authority: Minnesota Department of Natural Resources,
- Website: www.dnr.state.mn.us/state_forests/sft00005/index.html

Ecology
- WWF Classification: Western Great Lakes Forests
- EPA Classification: Northern Lakes and Forests
- Dominant tree species: Picea mariana, Larix laricina, Thuja occidentalis

The Beltrami Island State Forest is a state forest located in Lake of the Woods, Roseau, and Beltrami counties, Minnesota. Named after Italian explorer Giacomo Beltrami, it is the second-largest state forest in the Minnesota system after Pine Island State Forest. The largest wildlife management area in the state at 321,149 acres (129,964 ha), the Red Lake Wildlife Management Area, is located within the forest. The majority of the forest is managed by the Minnesota Department of Natural Resources, although a significant portion are tribal lands belonging to the neighboring Red Lake Band of Ojibwe.

French explorers came to the area around 1730 in their search for a route to the Pacific Ocean, retaining control of the area via the fur trade until after 1760, when the British Hudson's Bay Company gained control of the area. The Treaty of 1818 gave the Americans technical control over the area, although the Ojibwe retained control over the land until ceding all their holdings in the Red River Valley as a result of the Treaty of Old Crossing in 1863.

The majority of land in the forest is coniferous swamp dominated by species such as black spruce, tamarack, and northern white cedar, although red pine, jack pine, and aspen exist in upland areas. Much of the pine that characterizes the upland acreage were planted by the federal Civilian Conservation Corps in the 1930s, based out of Norris Camp now located in the Red Lake WMA portion of the forest. Within the perimeters of the forest are the headwaters of the Roseau River, Warroad River, North Branch Rapid River, and Moose River. All rivers ultimately drain northward into Hudson Bay due to the forest's location north of the Laurentian Divide.

Outdoor recreation activities include hiking and mountain biking on provided trails, as well as backcountry camping. Trails include 25 miles (40 km) of hiking, 27 miles (43 km) of horseback riding, 238 miles (383 km) available for Class I and II all-terrain vehicle use as well as dirt biking, and 138 miles (222 km) for snowmobiling. Nearby Zippel Bay State Park and adjacent Hayes Lake State Park have facilities suitable for camping.

== Climate ==
Climate data for Camp Norris, Minnesota, 1991–2020 normals: 1289ft (393m)
Month	Jan	Feb	Mar	Apr	May	Jun	Jul	Aug	Sep	Oct	Nov	Dec	Year
Record high °F (°C)	48 (9)	57 (14)	77 (25)	84 (29)	91 (33)	97 (36)	96 (36)	98 (37)	92 (33)	89 (32)	71 (22)	47 (8)	98 (37)
Mean maximum °F (°C)	39 (4)	39 (4)	56 (13)	71 (22)	82 (28)	87 (31)	89 (32)	89 (32)	86 (30)	74 (23)	55 (13)	39 (4)	92 (33)
Mean daily maximum °F (°C)	14.2 (−9.9)	20.1 (−6.6)	34.0 (1.1)	49.1 (9.5)	63.2 (17.3)	72.5 (22.5)	77.6 (25.3)	75.9 (24.4)	66.0 (18.9)	50.3 (10.2)	33.3 (0.7)	19.8 (−6.8)	48.0 (8.9)
Daily mean °F (°C)	3.8 (−15.7)	8.5 (−13.1)	22.5 (−5.3)	37.4 (3.0)	51.1 (10.6)	61.4 (16.3)	65.6 (18.7)	63.7 (17.6)	55.0 (12.8)	40.6 (4.8)	24.8 (−4.0)	10.8 (−11.8)	37.1 (2.8)
Mean daily minimum °F (°C)	−6.5 (−21.4)	−3.2 (−19.6)	11.1 (−11.6)	25.8 (−3.4)	38.9 (3.8)	50.2 (10.1)	53.5 (11.9)	51.5 (10.8)	44.0 (6.7)	31.0 (−0.6)	16.2 (−8.8)	1.7 (−16.8)	26.2 (−3.2)
Mean minimum °F (°C)	−32 (−36)	−28 (−33)	−17 (−27)	8 (−13)	23 (−5)	34 (1)	42 (6)	38 (3)	29 (−2)	17 (−8)	−6 (−21)	−22 (−30)	−33 (−36)
Record low °F (°C)	−50 (−46)	−41 (−41)	−32 (−36)	−8 (−22)	15 (−9)	22 (−6)	37 (3)	32 (0)	22 (−6)	4 (−16)	−25 (−32)	−43 (−42)	−50 (−46)
Average precipitation inches (mm)	0.79 (20)	0.69 (18)	0.88 (22)	1.46 (37)	2.93 (74)	3.99 (101)	3.52 (89)	3.45 (88)	3.06 (78)	2.31 (59)	1.14 (29)	0.86 (22)	25.08 (637)
Source 1: NOAA
Source 2: XMACIS (records & monthly max/mins)

== See also ==
- List of Minnesota state forests
