= Battleground State Forest =

State forest in Minnesota, United States

- Location within Minnesota
- Interactive map of Battleground State Forest

Geography
- Location: Cass County, Minnesota, United States
- Coordinates: 47°07′25″N 94°08′06″W
- Area: 17,969 acres (7,272 ha)

Administration
- Established: 1963
- Authority: Minnesota Department of Natural Resources
- Website: www.dnr.state.mn.us/state_forests/sft00003/index.html

Ecology
- WWF Classification: Western Great Lakes Forests
- EPA Classification: Northern Lakes and Forests

The Battleground State Forest is a state forest located near Gould Township in Cass County, Minnesota. It is managed by the Minnesota Department of Natural Resources. It lies entirely within the boundaries of the Chippewa National Forest, additionally, and a portion of the forest falls within the borders of the Leech Lake Indian Reservation.

Outdoor recreation activities include hiking and mountain biking on provided trails, as well as backcountry camping. Swimming and fishing are an option on bordering Leech Lake, boating is possible due to the forest's two public access boat launches.

== See also ==
- List of Minnesota state forests
