= Nemadji State Forest =

State Forest in Pine County, Minnesota

- Location within Minnesota
- Interactive map of Nemadji State Forest

Geography
- Location: Pine and Carlton counties, Minnesota, United States
- Coordinates: 46°20′55″N 92°24′09″W
- Elevation: 1,306 feet (398 m)
- Area: 92,924 acres (37,605 ha)

Administration
- Established: 1935
- Authority: Minnesota Department of Natural Resources
- Website: www.dnr.state.mn.us/state_forests/sft00035/index.html

Ecology
- WWF Classification: Western Great Lakes Forests
- EPA Classification: Northern Lakes and Forests

The Nemadji State Forest is a state forest located primarily in Pine County, Minnesota. A small portion of the forest extends into neighboring Carlton County. The eastern perimeter of the forest borders the state of Wisconsin. It is managed by the Minnesota Department of Natural Resources. Gray wolves, white-tailed deer, and eagles are present in the forest.

== Geography & history ==
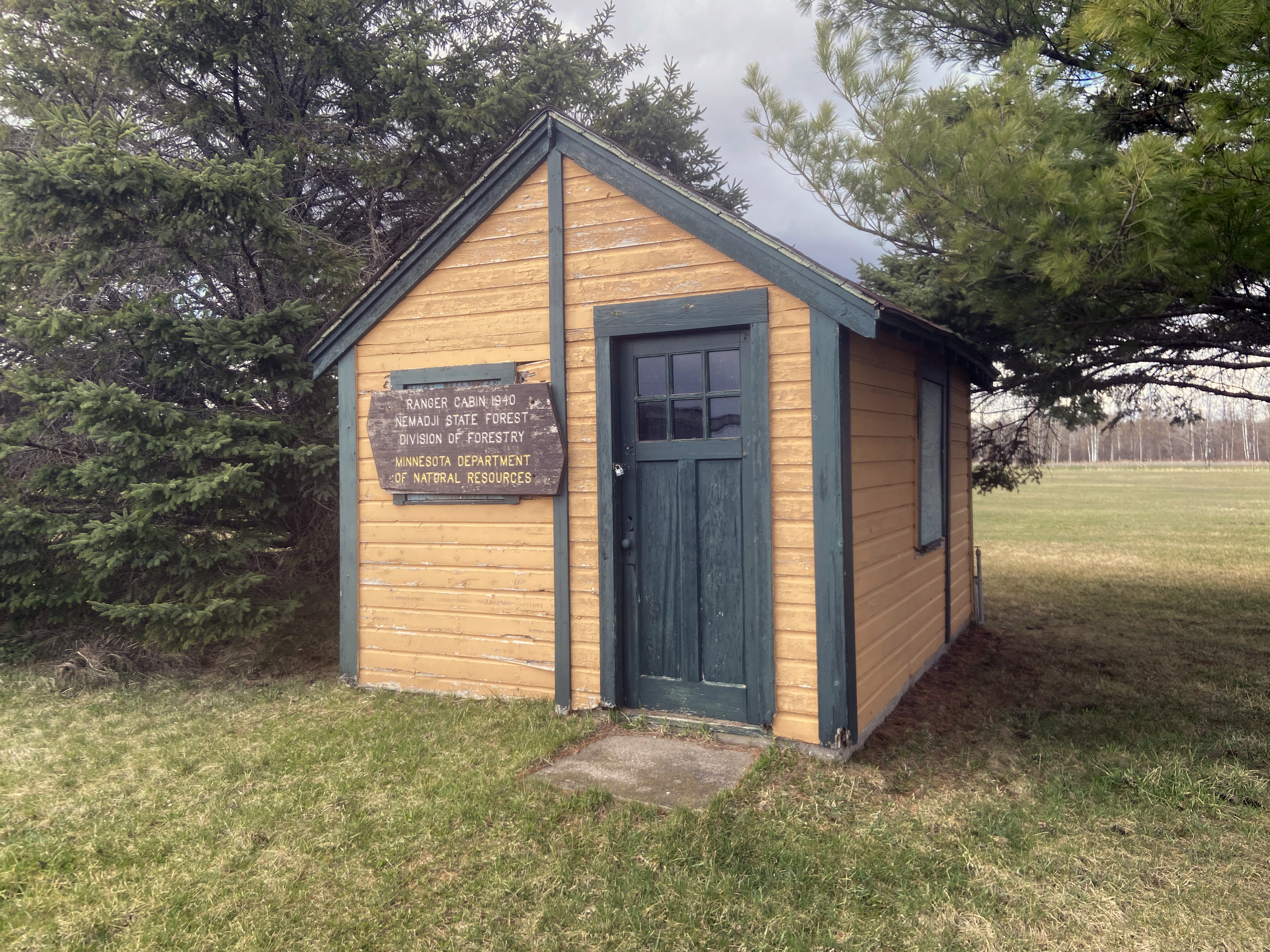
Historic 1940 Ranger Cabin from Nemadji State Forest at the Carlton County Fair

The topography of the forest varies from rolling upland sites to extensive swamps in the southern and northeastern portion of the forest. The forest is divided between two watersheds: the Willow River and Lower Tamarack River along with the southern two-thirds of the forest, eventually feed into the St. Croix River, whereas, the numerous streams in the northern one-third portion of the forest lead to Lake Superior. The area's old-growth forest was logged throughout the nineteenth century, with the Willow, Tamarack, and Nemadji Rivers being used to drive logs down the St. Croix to sawmills in Stillwater. The majority of the forest came under the ownership of the state after tax forfeitures in the early 1900s.

== Recreation ==
Popular outdoor recreational activities are hunting, fishing and boating on lakes, birdwatching, and dispersed camping. Trails are well-developed and extensive in the forest: 3 miles (4.8 km) trails are designated for hiking and cross-country skiing in the wintertime, 32 miles (51 km) for horseback riding, with 121 miles (195 km) designated for both Class I and II all-terrain vehicle and off-highway motorcycling use. Additionally, a segment of the Willard Munger State Trail, known as the "boundary segment" for its location near the Minnesota–Wisconsin border, traverses the forest.

== See also ==
- List of Minnesota state forests
