= Lake Isabella State Forest =

State forest in Lake County, Minnesota

- Location within Minnesota
- Interactive map of Lake Isabella State Forest

Geography
- Location: Crystal Bay Township / Stony River Township, Lake County, Minnesota, United States
- Coordinates: 47°48′35″N 91°17′10″W=
- Elevation: 1,552 feet (473 m)
- Area: 638 acres (258 ha)

Administration
- Established: 1963
- Authority: United States Forest Service
- Website: www.dnr.state.mn.us/state_forests/sft00029/index.html

Ecology
- WWF Classification: Western Great Lakes Forests
- EPA Classification: Northern Lakes and Forests

The Lake Isabella State Forest is a state forest located in Lake County, Minnesota. The forest is located completely within the Superior National Forest and the Boundary Waters Canoe Area Wilderness, and is thus subject to the management of the United States Forest Service. At 638 acres (258 ha), it one of the smallest forests in the Minnesota state system.

Hiking, canoeing, and kayaking are popular outdoor recreational activities in the forest. Although there are no campsites within the forest itself, dispersed camping is possible in the neighboring Superior National Forest.

== See also ==
- List of Minnesota state forests
