= General C. C. Andrews State Forest =

State Forest in Pine County, Minnesota

- Location within Minnesota
- Interactive map of General C. C. Andrews State Forest

Geography
- Location: Pine County, Minnesota, United States
- Coordinates: 46°12′14″N 92°28′52″W
- Elevation: 1,083 feet (330 m)
- Area: 7,770 acres (3,140 ha)

Administration
- Established: 1943
- Authority: Minnesota DNR (70%), Private (30%)
- Website: www.dnr.state.mn.us/state_forests/sft00020/index.html

Ecology
- WWF Classification: Western Great Lakes Forests
- EPA Classification: Northern Lakes and Forests
- Dominant tree species: Pinus resinosa, Pinus banksiana

The General C. C. Andrew State Forest is a state forest located in Pine County, Minnesota. The forest is named in honor of major general Christopher Columbus Andrews, a Civil War veteran, and an early Minnesota state Forestry Commissioner and proponent for scientific forestry and forest management. The Minnesota Department of Natural Resources manages the majority of the forest.

== History and overview ==
At the turn of the twentieth century the land where the forest is now located, along with the majority of Minnesota, was logged and opened to homesteading, however the sandy soil make the area unsuitable for agriculture. Many homesteads were abandoned and returned to the county up until the end of the Great Depression, when in 1939 the state purchased land for the General Andrews State Forest Nursery, a tree nursery. Four years later the land the nursery and the surrounding land were incorporated as a state forest.

== Forest today and recreation ==
Jack Pine and Red Pine dominate the rolling terrain and sandy soils of the forest, which are a result of the glacial outwash that occurred at the end of the Wisconsin glaciation. Acres of Paper Birch, aspen, and Red Oak are also present. There is boating access and a pier on the Willow River, which runs through the forest.

Other outdoor recreational activities include mountain biking, cross-country skiing, and horseback riding, as well as camping on a site adjacent to the Willow River. Trails include 40 miles (64 km) for hiking, 37 miles (60 km) available for Class I and II all-terrain vehicle use as well as dirt biking.

== See also ==
- List of Minnesota state forests
- Banning State Park
