= Badoura State Forest =

State forest in Minnesota, United States

- Location within Minnesota
- Interactive map of Badoura State Forest

Geography
- Location: Cass and Hubbard Counties, Minnesota, United States
- Coordinates: 46°50′20″N 94°42′45″W
- Area: 4,520 acres (1,830 ha)

Administration
- Established: 1963
- Authority: Minnesota Department of Natural Resources, Cass/Hubbard Counties, Private
- Website: www.dnr.state.mn.us/state_forests/sft00002/index.html

Ecology
- WWF Classification: Western Great Lakes Forests
- EPA Classification: Northern Lakes and Forests
- Dominant tree species: Pinus banksiana

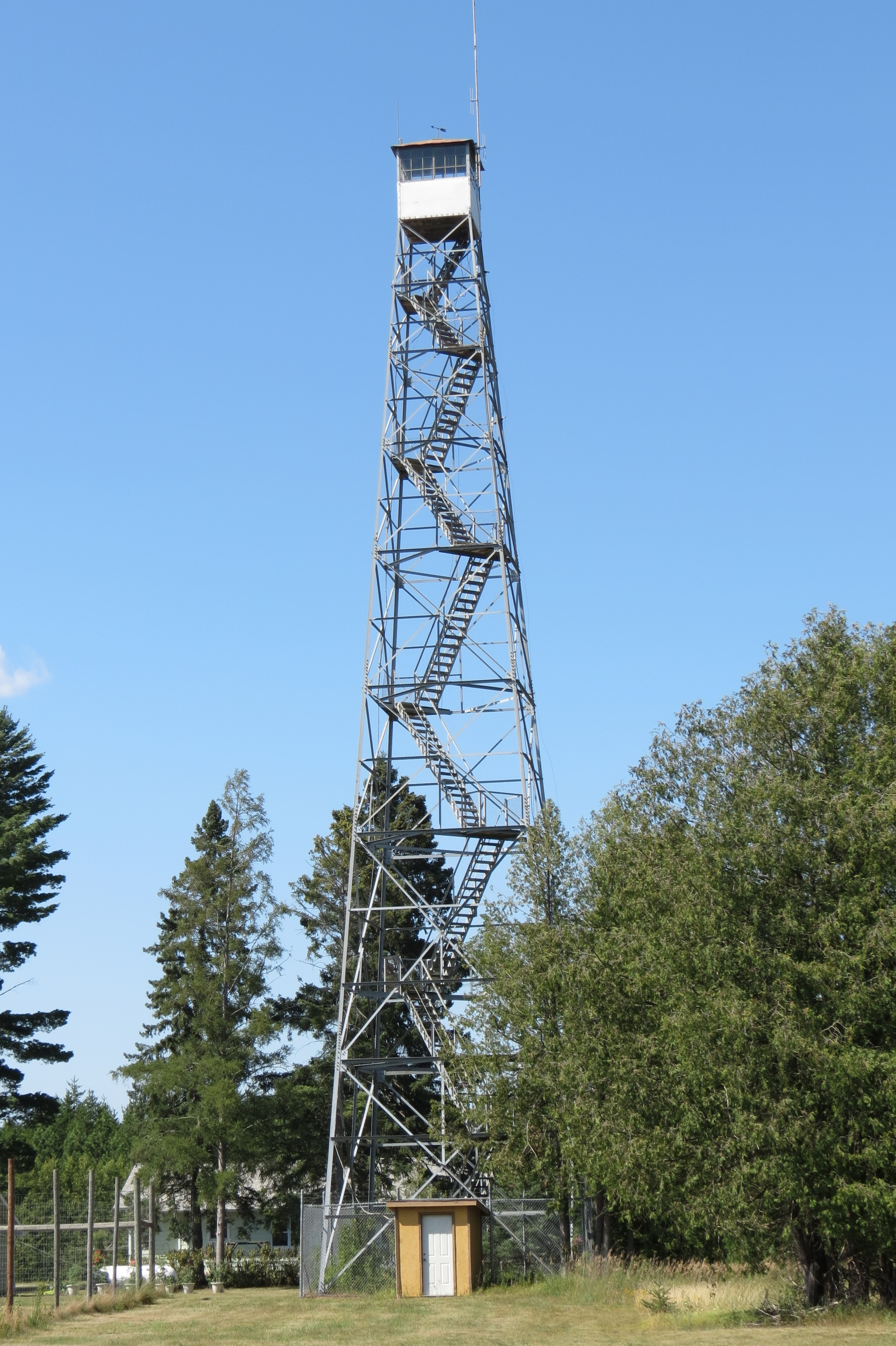
Fire lookout tower located at state tree nursery south of Akeley, Minnesota. Tower dates to 1934.

The Badoura State Forest is a state forest located in Cass County and Hubbard County, Minnesota. 85% of the forest is managed by the Minnesota Department of Natural Resources, with the remaining 15% managed privately and by counties. Over half of the forest land is wetlands interspersed with Jack pine.

Outdoor recreation activities include hunting, hiking and backcountry camping.

== See also ==
- List of Minnesota state forests
