= Bowstring State Forest =

State forest in Minnesota, United States

- Location within Minnesota
- Interactive map of Bowstring State Forest

Geography
- Location: Itasca and Cass counties, Minnesota, United States
- Coordinates: 47°25′06″N 94°05′33″W
- Area: 526,569 acres (213,095 ha)

Administration
- Established: 1963
- Authority: Minnesota Department of Natural Resources, USFS
- Website: www.dnr.state.mn.us/state_forests/sft00009/index.html

Ecology
- WWF Classification: Western Great Lakes forests
- EPA Classification: Northern Lakes and Forests

The Bowstring State Forest is a state forest located in Itasca and Cass Counties in Minnesota. It is located entirely within the boundaries of the federally managed Chippewa National Forest, and is managed by the Minnesota Department of Natural Resources.

The 56,470 acres (22,850 ha) Lake Winnibigoshish is located entirely within the forest. Additionally, the forest has public access to Leech Lake and Cass Lake. Fish species found in the lakes within the forest include walleye, northern pike, yellow perch, largemouth bass, smallmouth bass, crappie and bluegill. Boating and swimming are also available on the lakes. Other outdoor recreation opportunities include hunting and backcountry camping. Trails are provided for cross-country skiing, hiking, snowmobiling, mountain biking, and Class I and II all-terrain vehicle use.

== History ==
The Bowstring State Forest was de facto established in 1927, when state lands within the boundaries of the Minnesota National Forest were withdrawn from sale and directed to be managed in the same fashion as other state forest lands. The forest was formally established as the Bowstring State Forest in 1963. It is named after Bowstring Lake, located within the forest.

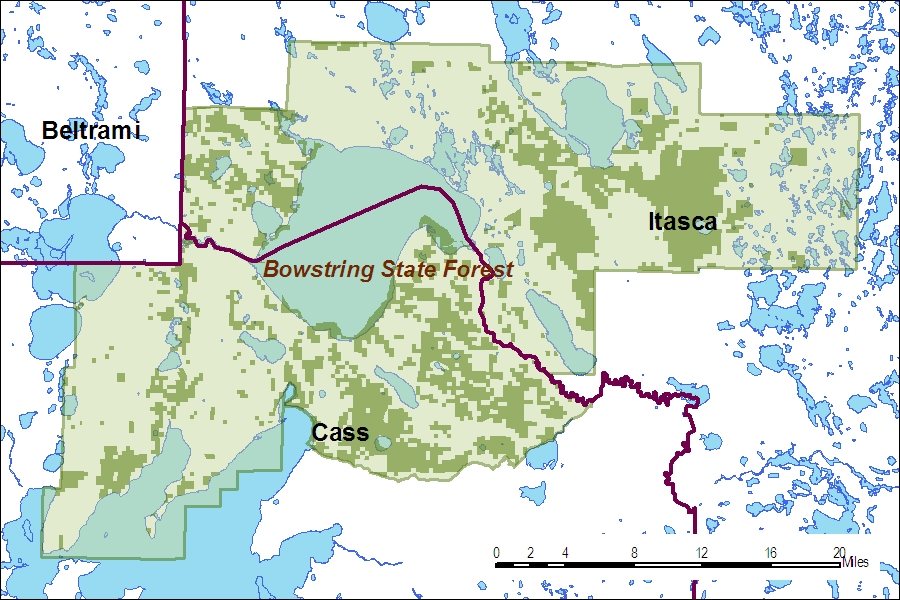
Location and boundary of the Bowstring State Forest

== See also ==
- List of Minnesota state forests
