= Buena Vista State Forest =

State forest in Minnesota, United States

- Location within Minnesota
- Interactive map of Buena Vista State Forest

Geography
- Location: Beltrami County, Minnesota, United States
- Coordinates: 47°20′25″N 94°24′46″W
- Area: 104,073 acres (42,117 ha)

Administration
- Established: 1935
- Authority: Minnesota Department of Natural Resources
- Website: www.dnr.state.mn.us/state_forests/sft00010/index.html

Ecology
- WWF Classification: Western Great Lakes Forests
- EPA Classification: Northern Lakes and Forests

The Buena Vista State Forest is a state forest located in Beltrami County, Minnesota. The Minnesota Department of Natural Resources manages 18,693 acres (7,565 ha) of state lands, with the majority of the forest split between private and other public ownership. The eastern half of the forest falls within the Chippewa National Forest, where Federal lands are managed by the United States Forest Service.

Boating and fishing are popular on the lakes accessible in the forest, including Lake Beltrami, Big Bass Lake, Gull Lake, Sandy Lake, and Three Island Lake.

Outdoor recreation activities include hunting, picnicking, as well as backcountry camping. Trails include 20 miles (32 km) for cross-country skiing, and 21 miles (34 km) for snowmobiling. The snowmobiling trail connects with other regional trails to provide access to Nebish, Blackduck, Turtle River, and Bemidji.

== See also ==
- List of Minnesota state forests
