= Birch Lakes State Forest =

State forest in Minnesota, United States

- Location within Minnesota
- Interactive map of Birch Lakes State Forest

Geography
- Location: Stearns County, Minnesota, United States
- Coordinates: 45°27′20″N 94°27′40″W
- Area: 710 acres (290 ha)

Administration
- Established: 1959
- Authority: Minnesota Department of Natural Resources,
- Website: www.dnr.state.mn.us/state_forests/sft00007/index.html

Ecology
- WWF Classification: Upper Midwest forest-savanna transition
- EPA Classification: North Central Hardwood Forests/Western Corn Belt Plains

The Birch Lakes State Forest is a state forest located in Stearns County, Minnesota. One of the smallest Minnesota state forests, it is managed primarily for recreation by the Minnesota Department of Natural Resources. Big Birch Lake, a 2,112 acres (855 ha) sand- and marl-bottomed lake, is accessible from the northeast corner of the forest. The forest is located in a transitory ecotone between the temperate deciduous forest to the northeast and the tallgrass prairie to the southwest, with the rolling terrain characteristic of the glacial activity in the area.

Outdoor recreation activities include boating, fishing, swimming in Big Birch Lake, as well as hunting, picnicking, and backcountry camping in the forest. Trails include 7 miles (11 km) of hiking, 7 miles (11 km) of mountain biking, and 4.1 miles (6.6 km) for snowmobiling.

== Campground ==
The Birch lakes State Forest Campground is considered a primitive campground. An individual site is $14, which consists of a cleared area, fire ring, and tables. In addition, a vault toilet, garbage cans, and drinking water is available. The campground features 29 shaded campsites located near the Big Birch Lake.

== See also ==
- List of Minnesota state forests
