= List of Minnesota state forests =

Minnesota State Forests are State forests located within the U.S. State of Minnesota. The 59 state forests were established by the Minnesota Legislature in order to conserve and manage the forest resources, including: Timber management, Wildlife management, Water resources management, and Public recreation. Acreage of Minnesota's State Forests is over 4,200,000 acres (17,000 km^{2}).

Minnesota's state forests are generally managed by the Minnesota Department of Natural Resources, Division of Forestry - headquartered in Saint Paul, Minnesota. Some forest land is managed entirely or in-part by the counties in which they are located in, or by the United States Forest Service in cases where state forests are located within the boundaries of either Chippewa National Forest or Superior National Forest.

The following is a list of state forests in Minnesota:

== List of Minnesota state forests ==
Name	County or counties	Area	Notes
Badoura	Cass, Hubbard	4,520 acres (18.3 km^{2})	Established 1963, sections of forest also managed by Cass and Hubbard counties.
Battleground	Cass	17,969 acres (72.72 km^{2})	Established in 1963, lies entirely within the boundaries of the Chippewa National Forest, additionally, and a portion of the forest falls within the borders of the Leech Lake Indian Reservation.
Bear Island	Lake, St. Louis	157,814 acres (638.65 km^{2})	Established in 1963. Access to the 2,362-acre (956 ha) Bear Island Lake, 5,628-acre (2,278 ha) Birch Lake, as well as canoe and boat access to multiple smaller lakes within the forest. The Taconite State Trail runs through the forest, although it can only be accessed through the nearby Bear Head Lake State Park and Soudan Underground Mine State Park.
Beltrami Island	Beltrami, Lake of the Woods, Roseau	703,336 acres (2,846.30 km^{2})	Established in 1933, named for Italian Explorer Giacomo Beltrami.
Big Fork	Itasca, Koochiching	127,929 acres (517.71 km^{2})	Established in 1963, the "Lost 40" and the largest red pine in the state of Minnesota are located within the forest.
Birch Lakes	Stearns	710 acres (2.9 km^{2})	Established in 1959, The forest is located in a transitory ecotone between the temperate deciduous forest to the northeast and the tallgrass prairie to the southwest.
Blackduck	Beltrami, Itasca	125,529 acres (508.00 km^{2})	Established in 1935.
Bowstring	Cass, Itasca	526,569 acres (2,130.95 km^{2})	Established in 1963. The 56,470 acres (22,850 ha) Lake Winnibigoshish is located entirely within the forest.
Buena Vista	Beltrami	104,073 acres (421.17 km^{2})	Established in 1935.
Burntside	Lake, St. Louis	74,815 acres (302.77 km^{2})	Established in 1905, home to Burntside Lake, portions of the forest are within the Boundary Waters Canoe Area Wilderness and Superior National Forest.
Centennial	Cass	3,394 acres (13.74 km^{2})	
Chengwatana	Chisago, Pine	29,039 acres (117.52 km^{2})	Established in 1953. The name is derived from the Ojibwe: Zhingwaadena, meaning white-pine town, after the nearby ghost town and township. Eastern White Pine was historically the dominant tree species in the surrounding forest prior to intensive logging at the end of the nineteenth century.
Cloquet Valley	St. Louis	327,098 acres (1,323.72 km^{2})	
Crow Wing	Crow Wing	31,307 acres (126.69 km^{2})	Established in 1935.
D.A.R. (Daughters of the American Revolution)	Pine	643 acres (2.60 km^{2})	Established in 1943.
Emily	Crow Wing	639 acres (2.59 km^{2})	Established in 1963.
Finland	Cook, Lake	311,970 acres (1,262.5 km^{2})	Established in 1933, Minnesota DNR manages approximately 1/3, while the remaining management is by U.S. Forest Service and Cook & Lake counties. Most of the forest is within the Superior National Forest.
Fond du Lac	Carlton, Saint Louis	64,505 acres (261.04 km^{2})	Established in 1933, parts of the forest are within the Fond du Lac Indian Reservation.
Foot Hills	Cass, Hubbard	46,896 acres (189.78 km^{2})	Established in 1931, hundreds of small lakes and potholes in the forest, formed during the Wisconsin glaciation, make boating, swimming, canoeing, and kayaking popular recreation activities.
General C. C. Andrews	Pine	7,770 acres (31.4 km^{2})	The forest is named in honor of Major General Christopher Columbus Andrews, a Civil War veteran, and an early Minnesota State Forestry Commissioner and proponent for scientific forestry and forest management.
George Washington	Itasca, Koochiching, and St. Louis	320,534 acres (1,297.16 km^{2})	Established in 1931.
Golden Anniversary	Itasca	6,811 acres (27.56 km^{2})	The forest was established in 1961 in celebration of the "golden anniversary" (50 years) of the Minnesota Department of Natural Resources's Division of Forestry.
Grand Portage	Cook	99,200 acres (401 km^{2})	Established in 1933, in extreme northeastern Minnesota. The forest is named after the Grand Portage, a historic trade route between the Great Lakes and the Northwest.
Hill River	Aitkin	124,204 acres (502.64 km^{2})	Established in 1963.
Huntersville	Wadena	33,963 acres (137.44 km^{2})	Established in 1963.
Insula	Lake	609 acres (2.46 km^{2})	Established in 1963, managed by United States Forest Service.
Jeanette	St. Louis	11,521 acres (46.62 km^{2})	Established in 1963, managed by United States Forest Service.
Kabetogama	Koochiching, St. Louis	619,287 acres (2,506.17 km^{2})	Established in 1933. Adjacent to Voyageurs National Park, and located on Lake Vermilion.
Koochiching	Itasca, Koochiching and St. Louis	567,985 acres (2,298.55 km^{2})	Established in 1943.
Lake Isabella	Lake	638 acres (2.58 km^{2})	Established in 1963.
Lake of the Woods	Beltrami, Koochiching, Lake of the Woods, and Roseau	142,331 acres (575.99 km^{2})	Established in 1990.
Land O'Lakes	Aitkin, Cass, and Crow Wing	51,498 acres (208.41 km^{2})	Established in 1933.
Lost River	Roseau	54,915 acres (222.23 km^{2})	Established in 1963.
Lyons	Wadena	14,789 acres (59.85 km^{2})	Established in 1963.
Mississippi Headwaters	Beltrami, Clearwater, and Hubbard	45,290 acres (183.3 km^{2})	Established in 1935, The forest is named after its location immediately downstream (north) of Lake Itasca, the headwaters of the Mississippi River.
Nemadji	Carlton, Pine	92,924 acres (376.05 km^{2})	Established in 1935.
Northwest Angle	Lake of the Woods	144,412 acres (584.41 km^{2})	Established in 1935. The name of the forest is derived from its location near the Northwest Angle, the northernmost point of the contiguous United States. The forest borders the Canadian provinces of Manitoba and Ontario.
Pat Bayle	Cook	180,403 acres (730.07 km^{2})	Established in 1963, located within the Superior National Forest. Eagle Mountain, the highest natural point in Minnesota, at 2,301 feet (701 m), is located within the forest.
Paul Bunyan	Cass, Hubbard	150,113 acres (607.49 km^{2})	Established in 1935. The Paul Bunyan State Trail, the Heartland State Trail, and the North Country National Scenic Trail all pass through the forest.
Pillsbury	Cass	25,612 acres (103.65 km^{2})	Established in 1900. Named for Governor John S. Pillsbury, who served from 1876-1882. Located on the western shore of Gull Lake.
Pine Island	Beltrami, Itasca, Koochiching County, Minnesota, and Lake of the Woods	878,040 acres (3,553.3 km^{2})	Established in 1933. Largest State Forest, although boundary of Richard J. Dorer Memorial Hardwood is larger only about 45,000 acres of RJDMH State Forest are state owned.
Red Lake	Beltrami, Koochiching	84,105 acres (340.36 km^{2})	Established in 1963.
Remer	Cass, Itasca	12,850 acres (52.0 km^{2})	
Richard J. Dorer Memorial Hardwood	Dakota, Fillmore, Goodhue, Houston, Olmsted, Wabasha, and Winona	1,016,204 acres (4,112.43 km^{2})	Established in 1961. Located in Minnesota's Driftless Area. Only 45,000 acres (180 km2) of the land is state owned, with the remainder owned by private individuals and community groups, governed by easements.
Rum River	Kanabec, Mille Lacs, and Morrison	40,605 acres (164.32 km^{2})	
Sand Dunes	Sherburne	11,040 acres (44.7 km^{2})	
Savanna	Aitkin, Carlton, Itasca, St. Louis	238,954 acres (967.01 km^{2})	Savanna Portage State Park is located within the forest.
Smokey Bear	Koochiching	12,276 acres (49.68 km^{2})	
Snake River	Aitkin, Kanabec	9,635 acres (38.99 km^{2})	
Solana	Aitkin, Pine	68,141 acres (275.76 km^{2})	
St. Croix	Pine	42,153 acres (170.59 km^{2})	
Sturgeon River	Itasca, St. Louis	170,587 acres (690.34 km^{2})	
Two Inlets	Becker, Hubbard	28,051 acres (113.52 km^{2})	
Waukenabo	Aitkin	15,688 acres (63.49 km^{2})	
Wealthwood	Aitkin	15,042 acres (60.87 km^{2})	
Welsh Lake	Cass, Hubbard	19,797 acres (80.12 km^{2})	
White Earth	Becker, Clearwater, and Mahnomen	155,390 acres (628.8 km^{2})	
Whiteface River	St. Louis	4,468 acres (18.08 km^{2})	

== See also ==
- List of Minnesota state parks
- Natural history of Minnesota
- List of Minnesota trees
- List of national forests of the United States
- Chippewa National Forest
- Superior National Forest
- United States Forest Service
