= D.A.R. State Forest =

D.A.R. State Forest may refer to:

- D.A.R. State Forest (Massachusetts)
- D.A.R. State Forest (Minnesota)
