= Northwestern Glaciated Plains =

Ecoregion in the Northwestern Great Plains, North America

- Level III
- Prairie near Hewitt Lake, Montana

- Level III ecoregions in the northwestern great plains, with the Northwestern Glaciated Plains ecoregion marked as 42. The Canadian portion is not shown.

Ecology
- Realm: Nearctic
- Biome: Temperate Grassland

Geography
- Countries: United States of America, Canada
- State: Montana; North Dakota; South Dakota; Nebraska; Alberta; Saskatchewan
- Climate type: Primarily Cold semi-arid (BSk)

The Northwestern Glaciated Plains is a Level III Ecoregion designated by the United States Environmental Protection Agency (EPA). Located in the United States and Canada, It is subdivided up into 18 Level IV Ecoregions.

== Setting ==
The ecoregion is located across northern Montana, northwest and central North Dakota, central South Dakota, and partially located in north-central Nebraska. In Canada it stretches from Alberta to Saskatchewan, forming most of Palliser's Triangle. Terrain is largely flat with pockets of rolling hills, and coulees are a common sight in the northwest portion of the ecoregion. Land use is transitional between intensive farming of grains in the east and cattle ranching in the west.

== Climate ==
The climate is largely semi-arid, but transitions into humid continental further East. The region endures both hot summers and frigid winters, especially in the North. For example, Loma, Montana holds the world record for most temperature change in a 24-hour period, with temperatures rising from −54 °F (−47.8 °C) to 49 °F (9.4 °C).

Silver sagebrush located in Richland County, Montana

== Flora ==
Plants here have adapted to the arid, quickly fluctuating climate. Dominant grasses are Salvia argentea (silver sagebrush), Artemisia frigida (fringed sagebrush), Bouteloua gracilis (blue grama), and Nassella viridula (green needlegrass). Opuntia (prickley pear cactus) is found in drier areas. Very little trees grow naturally in the ecoregion, owing to the limited rainfall and large amount of grazing animals that eat the young saplings. Nonetheless, trees like the Populus deltoides (plains cottonwood) and Acer negundo (box elder) can grow in moist areas alongside rivers and lakes where water is plentiful.

Black-tailed prairie dog in Grasslands National Park, Canada

== Fauna ==
Many of the animals located here are mammals who consume the various grasses. The American bison, once a dominant force, have been almost entirely extirpated from the ecoregion, but there are a limited number in protected areas. Coyotes roam the area and primarily feast on white-tailed jackrabbit if alone, and white-tailed deer and mule deer if in numbers. Richardson's ground squirrel and the less common Black-tailed prairie dog alter the landscape by building burrows for uses like storing food or caring for the young. Pronghorn populations have made a stark recovery since the early 20th century, largely in part due to conservation efforts. Birds also play a part in this ecoregion. American robins, Canadian geese, and mallard ducks are the primary birds present here. The Swainson's hawk, Ferruginous hawk, and occasionally the Bald eagle are the most dominant birds of prey.

== Level IV ecoregions ==
This ecoregion is subdivided into 18 level IV ecoregions:

- Missouri Coteau (42a)
- Collapsed Glacial Outwash (42b)
- Missouri Coteau Slope (42c)
- Northern Missouri Coteau (42d)
- Southern Missouri Coteau (42e)
- Southern Missouri Coteau Slope (42f)
- Ponca Plains (42g)
- Southern River Breaks (42h)
- Glaciated Dark Brown Prairie (42i)
- Glaciated Northern Grasslands (42j)
- Coteau Lakes Upland (42k)
- Sweetgrass Uplands (42l)
- Cherry Patch Moraines (42m)
- Milk River Pothole Upland (42n)
- North Central Brown Glaciated Plains (42o)
- Holt Tablelands (42p)
- Rocky Mountain Front Foothill Potholes (42q)
- Foothill Grassland (42r)

== Human use ==
Before European colonization indigenous people like the Blackfeet burned the prairies to encourage new growth. This new growth attracted bison and other animals, who were hunted for materials. Post European-settlement most of the land is used for cattle ranching. Where the land is arable the most common kinds of crop are grains like barley and wheat. Most major cities lie on the Canadian side. Saskatoon, Saskatchewan, Regina, Saskatchewan, Medicine Hat, Alberta, and Lethbridge, Alberta are examples. The American side is largely devoid of cities of such size with the exception of Bismarck, North Dakota.

== Conservation and threats ==
Very little unaltered landscape remains in the ecoregion. However, due to the nature of cattle ranching, there is a large potential for recovery as most of the dominant flora is still native growth. There are numerous protected areas, including Grasslands National Park and Theodore Roosevelt National Park. With Climate change continuing, this region is at risk. In some regions of Montana and the Dakotas, temperature has risen by as much as 5.5 °F in the past century. Natural disasters such as droughts and storms are expected to become more common.

== Gallery ==
Writing-on-Stone Provincial Park, Alberta

American bison at Fort Peck Indian Reservation, Montana

House in Val Marie, Saskatchewan

Oxbow overlook at Theodore Roosevelt National Park, North Dakota

== See also ==
- List of ecoregions in the United States (EPA)
