= Rapid River (Rainy River tributary) =

- Mouth of the Rapid River

Location
- Country: United States
- State: Minnesota
- Counties: Lake of the Woods, Koochiching

Physical characteristics
- Source
  - coordinates: 48.3699716°N 95.1449754°W
- Mouth
  - coordinates: 48°41′41″N 94°26′10″W
- Length: 50 mi (80 km)

Basin features
- River system: Rainy River
- Tributaries
  - left: North Fork Rapid River
  - right: East Branch Rapid River

The Rapid River is a 50 mi-long (80 km) river of Minnesota. It is a tributary of the Rainy River.

== Course ==
The Rapid River originates in Beltrami Island State Forest. It flows very near to Upper Red Lake Peatlands National Natural Landmark. It is a meandering stream flowing through a flat, fairly heavily farmed portion of Lake of the Woods and Koochiching Counties. It has three main branches, main, east branch and north fork.

The Rapid River water basin is the third smallest on the Minnesota side of the Rainy Lake basin.

== See also ==
- List of rivers of Minnesota
- List of longest streams of Minnesota
