= Big Birch Lake =

Lake in the state of Minnesota, United States

- Location within Minnesota
- Location: Stearns / Todd counties, Minnesota, U.S.
- Coordinates: 45.7778°N 94.7512°W
- Basin countries: United States
- Surface area: 2,108 acres (9 km^{2})
- Max. depth: 81 ft (25 m)

Big Birch Lake is a 2,108-acre (9 km^{2}) lake near the towns of Grey Eagle, Minnesota and St. Rosa, Minnesota. It has a maximum depth of 81 feet (25 m). It is popular for watersports and fishing.
