= Provincial forest =

Type of government-owned land in Canada

A provincial forest is a type of government-owned land in Canada, controlled by one of Canada's ten provinces. Canada has about 400 million hectares of forest land which is publicly owned, and provinces and territories have jurisdiction over the vast majority of the country's forests. The provincial forests are managed under provincial laws, regulations and policies, which can vary by province.

== Provincial control of forest lands ==
The largest class of landowners in Canada are the provincial governments, who hold all unclaimed land in their jurisdiction in the name of the Crown (Crown Lands). Over 90% of the sprawling boreal forest of Canada is provincial Crown land. Provincial lands account for 60% of the area of the province of Alberta, 94% of the land in British Columbia, 95% of Newfoundland and Labrador, and 48% of New Brunswick.

== Provincial forest lands by province ==
=== Alberta ===
The provincial forest lands in Alberta includes the Rocky Mountains Forest Reserve, which was designated in 1948 to conserve forests and protect water supplies in the province's eastern slopes.

=== Ontario ===
Ontario's forests cover more than 70 million hectares, of which 50 million hectares are public forests. Most of the land in Ontario are Crown Lands, representing 87% of the province. Crown forests in Ontario are managed under the Crown Forest Sustainability Act.

=== Quebec ===
In the province of Quebec, most forest land is public owned and more than 50% of the territory is covered by forests. Quebec has about 906,000 square kilometres of forest land which is 92% of its public land.

=== Manitoba ===
The province of Manitoba has 15 provincial forests which total to almost 22,000 square kilometres.

=== British Columbia ===
In British Columbia, 94% of the province is designated as Crown lands, allowing the province to manage most forest resources on public land. The forest stewardship in the province is based on sustainable forest management practices and related provincial oversight systems.

=== Saskatchewan ===
In Saskatchewan, provincial forests are designated Crown resource lands which are more than 343,000 square kilometres. Management of these lands is guided by 20-year forest management plans implemented by the ministry oversight and public reporting requirements.

== See also ==
- Forests of Canada
