= Wild camping =

Camping on an unofficial camping pitch

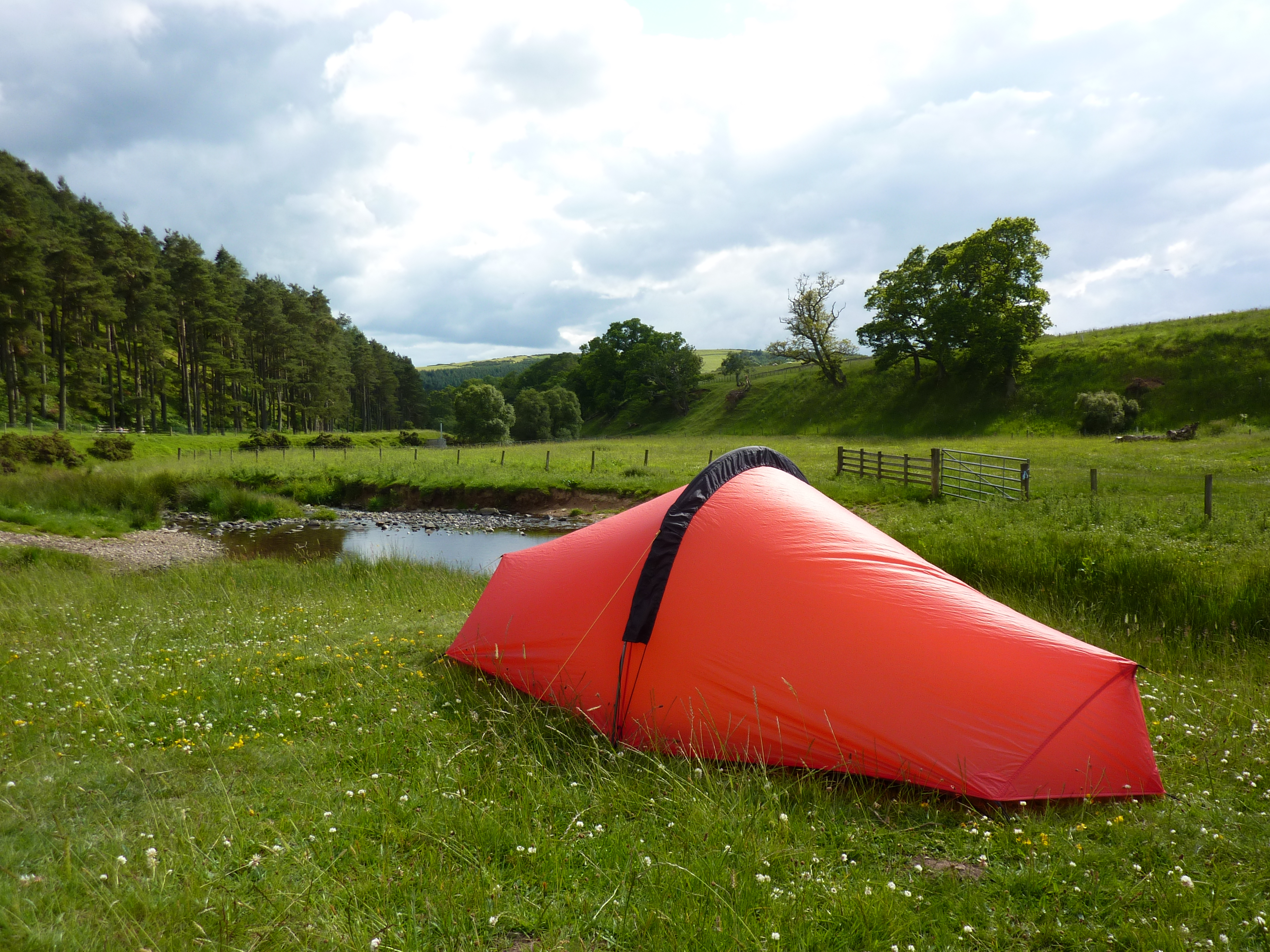
Wild camping outside Abbey St Bathans, Scotland.

Wild camping or dispersed camping is the act of camping in areas other than designated camping sites. Typically this means open countryside. This can form part of backpacking or bikepacking, possibly along a long-distance trail.

== Countries ==
=== Australia ===
In Australia, wild camping may be referred to as "bush camping". The regulations differ by state. In New South Wales, some national parks permit bush camping. In Victoria, bush camping is permitted in many, but not all, of the parks managed by Parks Victoria. Additionally, bush camping is permitted in assessed parts of the Victoria's Crown water frontages, which are strips of Crown land 20 metres or wider lining waterways in Victoria.

=== Canada ===
Camping outside of designated campsites is generally not permitted in national parks, provincial parks and cities in Canada. However it is typically allowed on Crown land, which covers 89% of the country. Regulations for camping on crown land vary by province, for example Ontario, Quebec, British Columbia.

=== Estonia ===
Wild camping for one night is legal, even on private property, as long as it does not harm or burden the landowner. Landowners may prohibit wild camping or trespassing with signs clearly indicating the prohibition or with fences. Camping in nature reserves is only permitted in the designated areas. Lighting a fire is prohibited everywhere except in designated areas or with explicit permission.

=== Finland ===
Wild camping is legal in Finland, even on private property, as long as it leaves no trace and does not impede the privacy or other rights of the landowner. In Finnish, this is known as Jokaisenoikeudet or 'the everyman's rights'.

=== India ===
Wild camping is strictly prohibited in the Indian reserved forests & protected forest areas like Tiger Reserves, National Parks and Wildlife Sanctuaries as these are wildlife native areas inhabited by Tigers, Elephants, Lions, Bears among other wild animals. It encourages illegal behaviour and hampers wildlife conservation due to illegal acts like poaching, deforestation, construction and irregularities in administration of certain reserves.

However, there are a few camping sites in some Reserved Forests which are operated by the Forest Departments with some basic amenities such as permanent tent bases that are under the supervision of Forest staff.

=== New Zealand ===
Relevant legislation in New Zealand includes the Freedom Camping Act 2011 and the subsequent updated guidance for local authorities which states "freedom camping is permitted everywhere in a local authority area unless it is prohibited or restricted in accordance with a by-law".

=== Oman ===
Wild camping is legal throughout Oman; tents can be pitched on public land.

=== Sweden ===
In Sweden, a right of public access – allowing outdoor recreational activity on privately held wilderness – is enshrined in the constitution.

=== United Kingdom ===
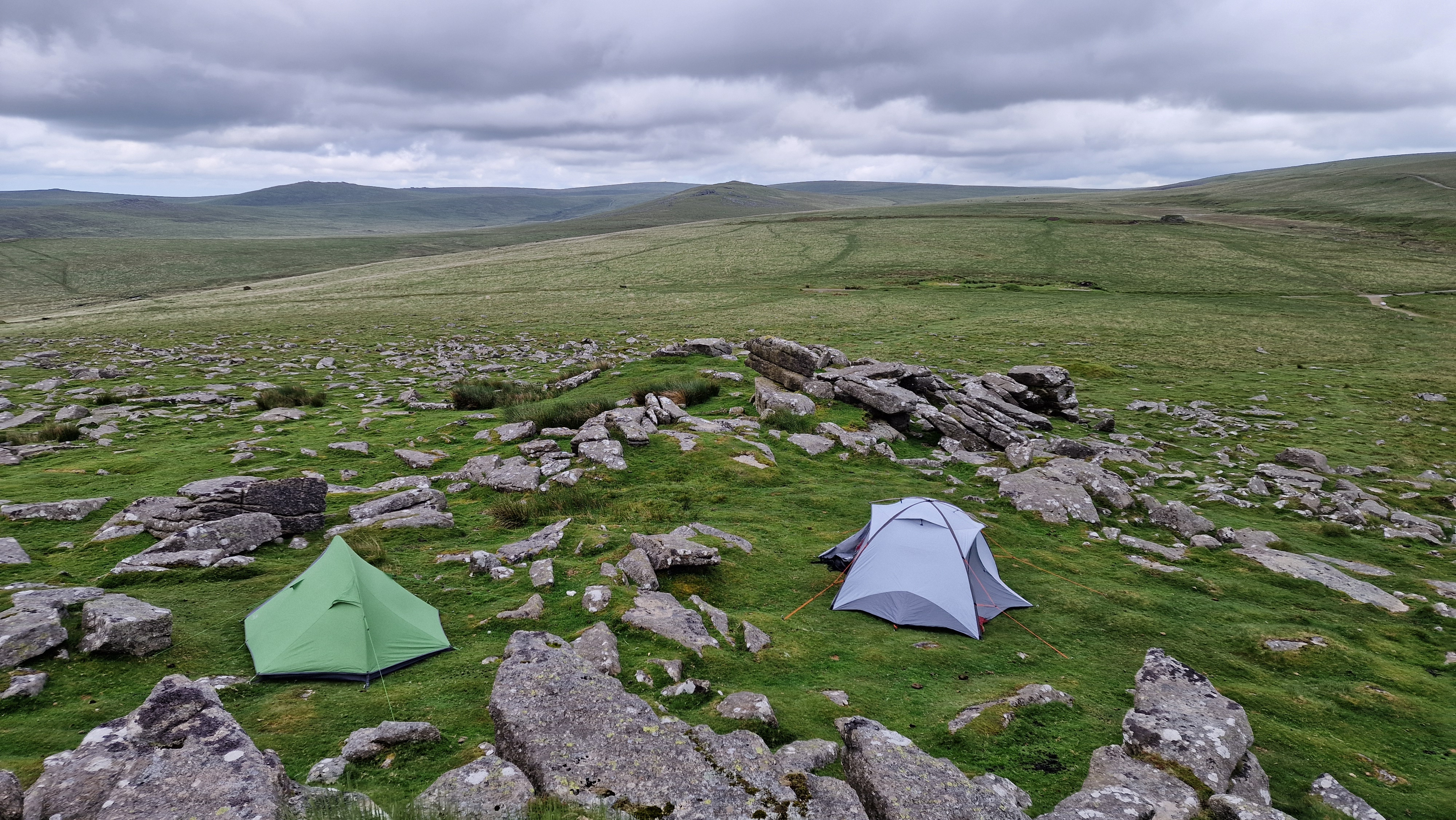
Wild camping on Dartmoor

Although land access for outdoor recreation was improved in England and Wales with the introduction of the Countryside and Rights of Way Act 2000, there is still no assumed right to camp in open countryside without the landowner's permission. There are certain areas where it has traditionally been tolerated, such as Dartmoor National Park, however in 2023 landowners challenged this access in the courts.

In Scotland, following the Land Reform (Scotland) Act 2003, people may camp on most unenclosed land, whether state or privately owned, provided they adhere to the Scottish Outdoor Access Code.

=== United States ===
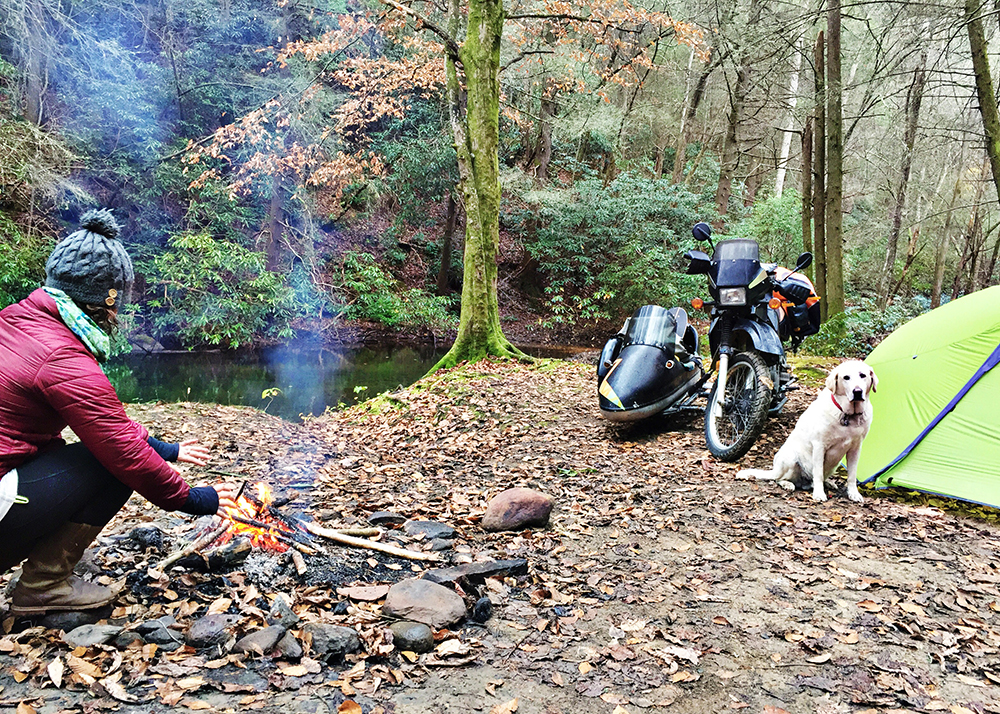
Dispersed camping is accessible across various lands in the United States.

Dispersed camping is the term given to camping in the United States on public land other than in designated campsites. This type of camping is most common on national forest and Bureau of Land Management land.

Designated campsites often offer services to the campers, such as trash removal, toilet facilities, tables and/or fire pits, which are not available at dispersed camping locations. Although dispersed camping takes place on public land, each managing agency has specific regulations for dispersed camping, though they generally all also require campers to follow Leave No Trace guidelines. In addition, some public lands restrict camping to 14 days.

Other terms used for this activity are boondocking, dry camping, and wild camping, to describe camping without connection to any services such as water, sewage, electricity, and Wi-Fi. Many national forests and Bureau of Land Management (BLM) lands throughout the United States offer primitive campgrounds with no facilities whatsoever. Camping closer than 300 feet from a water source is generally restricted. The USFS offers free travel management maps called MVUMs (Motor Vehicle Use Map) that show exactly where dispersed camping is restricted and what roads can be traveled on.

== See also ==
- Freedom to roam
