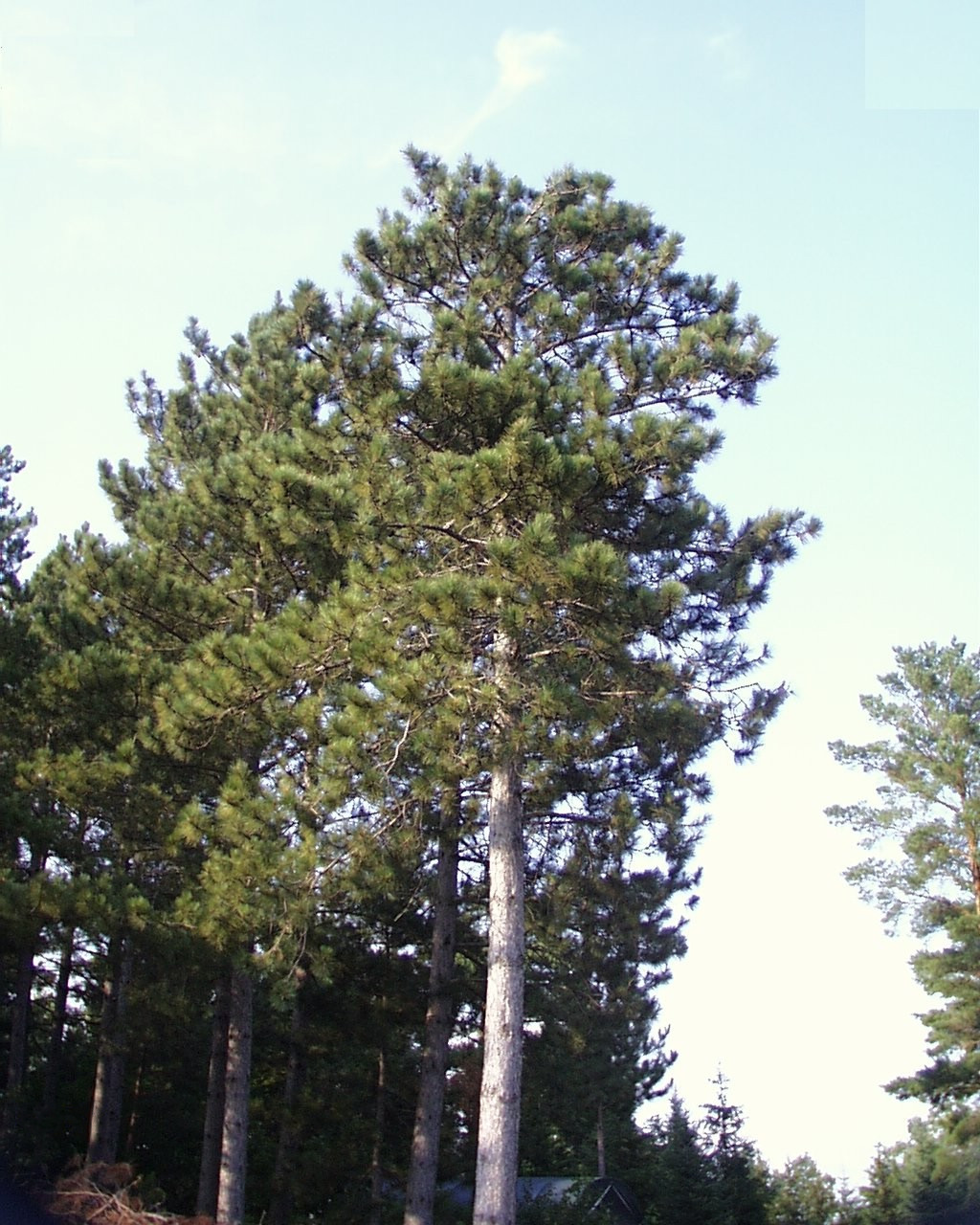
- Trees at Sherburne NWR, Minnesota

Conservation status
- Least Concern (IUCN 3.1)

Scientific classification
- Kingdom: Plantae
- Clade: Tracheophytes
- Clade: Gymnosperms
- Division: Pinophyta
- Class: Pinopsida
- Order: Pinales
- Family: Pinaceae
- Genus: Pinus
- Subgenus: P. subg. Pinus
- Section: P. sect. Pinus
- Subsection: P. subsect. Pinus
- Species: P. resinosa

Binomial name
- Pinus resinosa Sol. ex Aiton
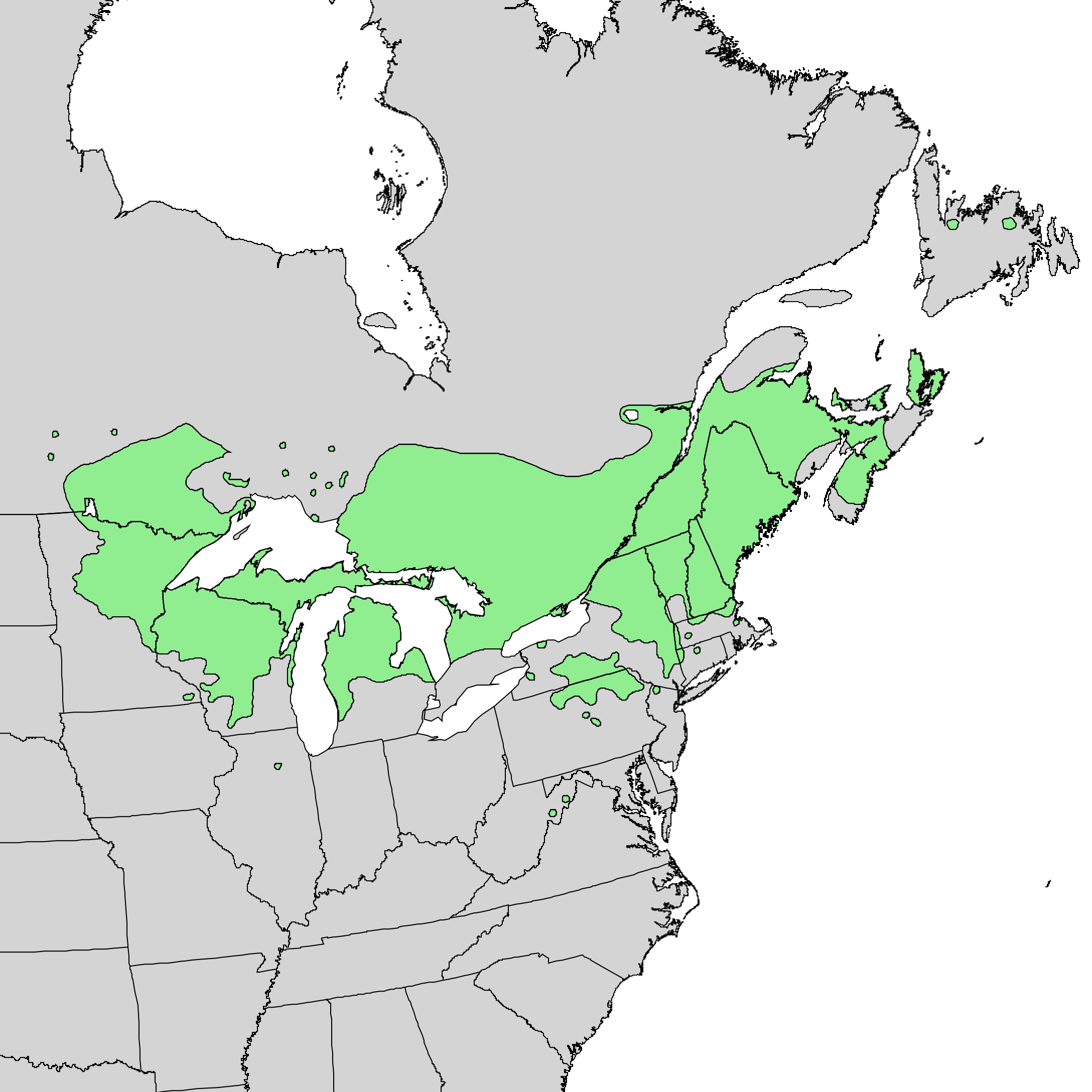

= Pinus resinosa =

Red pine

Species of plant (coniferous tree)

Pinus resinosa, known as red pine (also Norway pine in Minnesota), is a species of conifer in the family Pinaceae. A pine, it is native to Eastern North America, with a distribution from Pennsylvania and the Great Lakes region to Manitoba and Newfoundland. It is an adaptable species, and is a valuable forestry species in its native range. One of only two American members of subsection Pinus, the species is characterised by low genetic diversity.

== Description ==
Pinus resinosa is a coniferous tree characterized by tall, straight growth. It usually ranges from 20–35 metres (66–115 feet) in height and 1 m (3 ft 3 in) in trunk diameter, exceptionally reaching 43.77 m (143 1/2 ft) tall. The crown is conical, becoming a narrow rounded dome with age. The bark is thick and gray-brown at the base of the tree, but thin, flaky and bright orange-red in the upper crown; the tree's name derives from this distinctive character. Some red color may be seen in the fissures of the bark. The species is self pruning; there tend not to be dead branches on the trees, and older trees may have very long lengths of branchless trunk below the canopy.

The leaves are needle-like, dark yellow-green, in fascicles of two, 12–18 centimetres (4 3/4–7 inches) long, and brittle. The leaves snap cleanly when bent; this character, stated as diagnostic for red pine in some texts, is however shared by several other pine species. The cones are symmetrical ovoid, 4–6 cm (1 1/2–2 1/4 in) long by 2.5 cm (1 in) broad, and purple before maturity, ripening to nut-blue and opening to 4–5 cm (1 1/2–2 in) broad, the scales without a prickle and almost stalkless.The red pine grows well in sandy soils and on soils which are too poor for white pine. It can also be found in drier, more fire-prone sites than the eastern white pine, but often growing with it.

=== Phylogeny ===
Red pine is notable for its very constant morphology and low genetic variation throughout its range, suggesting it has been through a near extinction in its recent evolutionary history. A genetic study of nuclear microsatellite polymorphisms among populations distributed throughout its natural range found that red pine populations from Newfoundland are genetically distinct from most mainland populations, consistent with dispersal from different glacial refugia in this highly self-pollinating species.

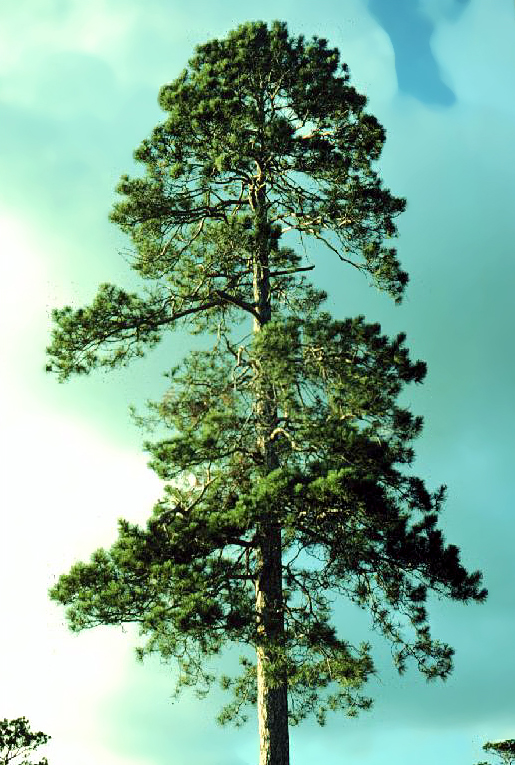
An old tree in Itasca State Park, Minnesota

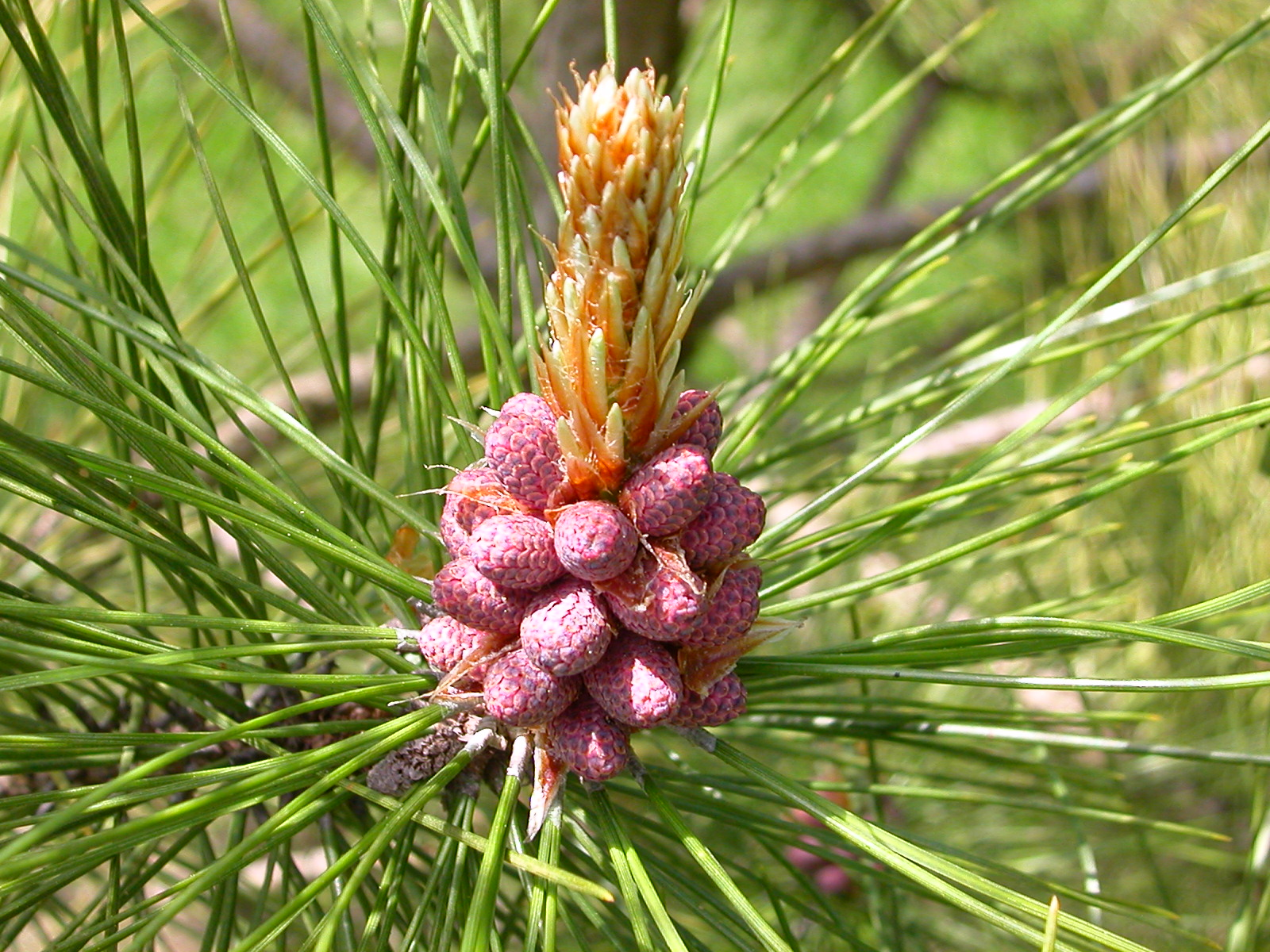
Pollen cones in spring

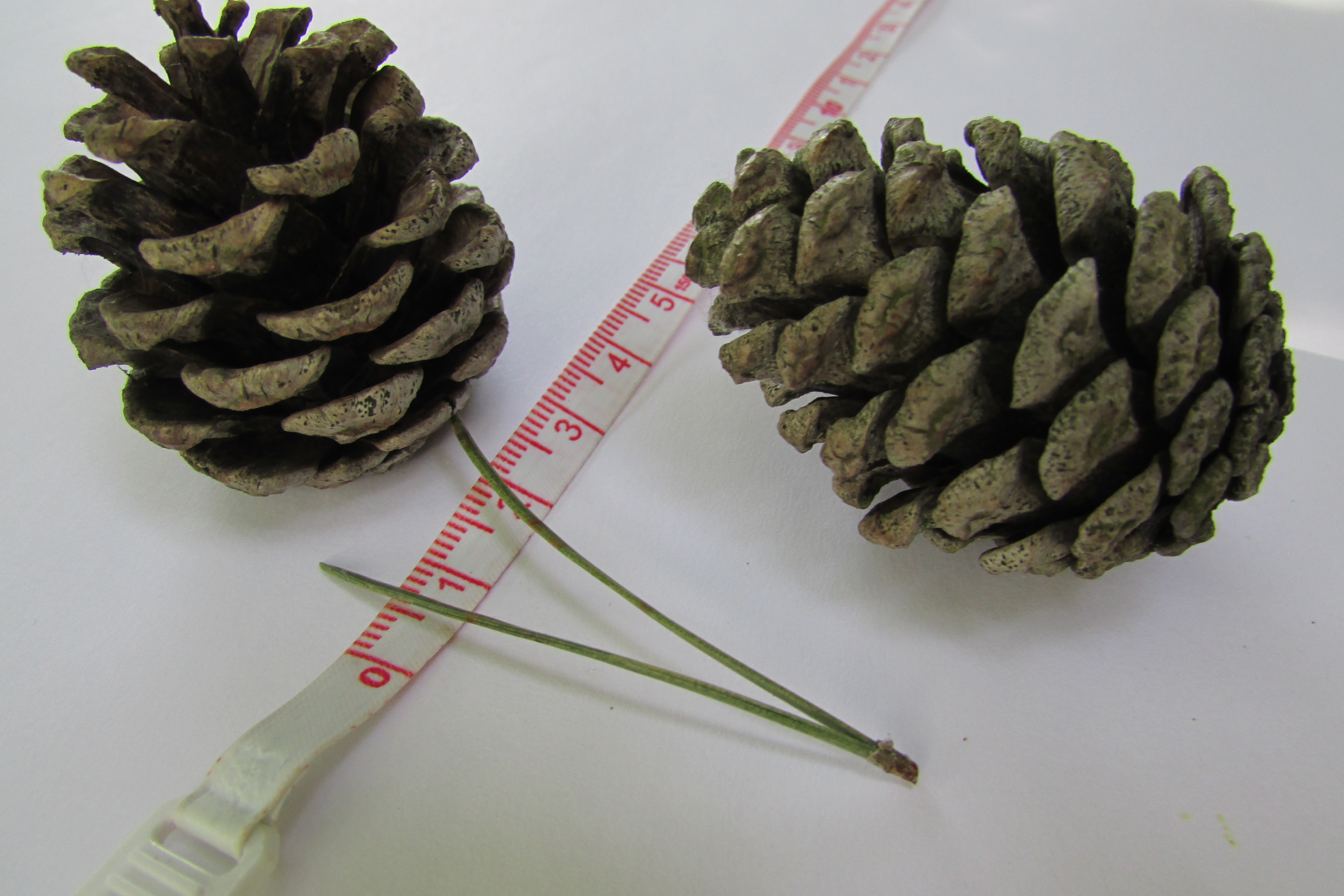
Cone (scale in cm)

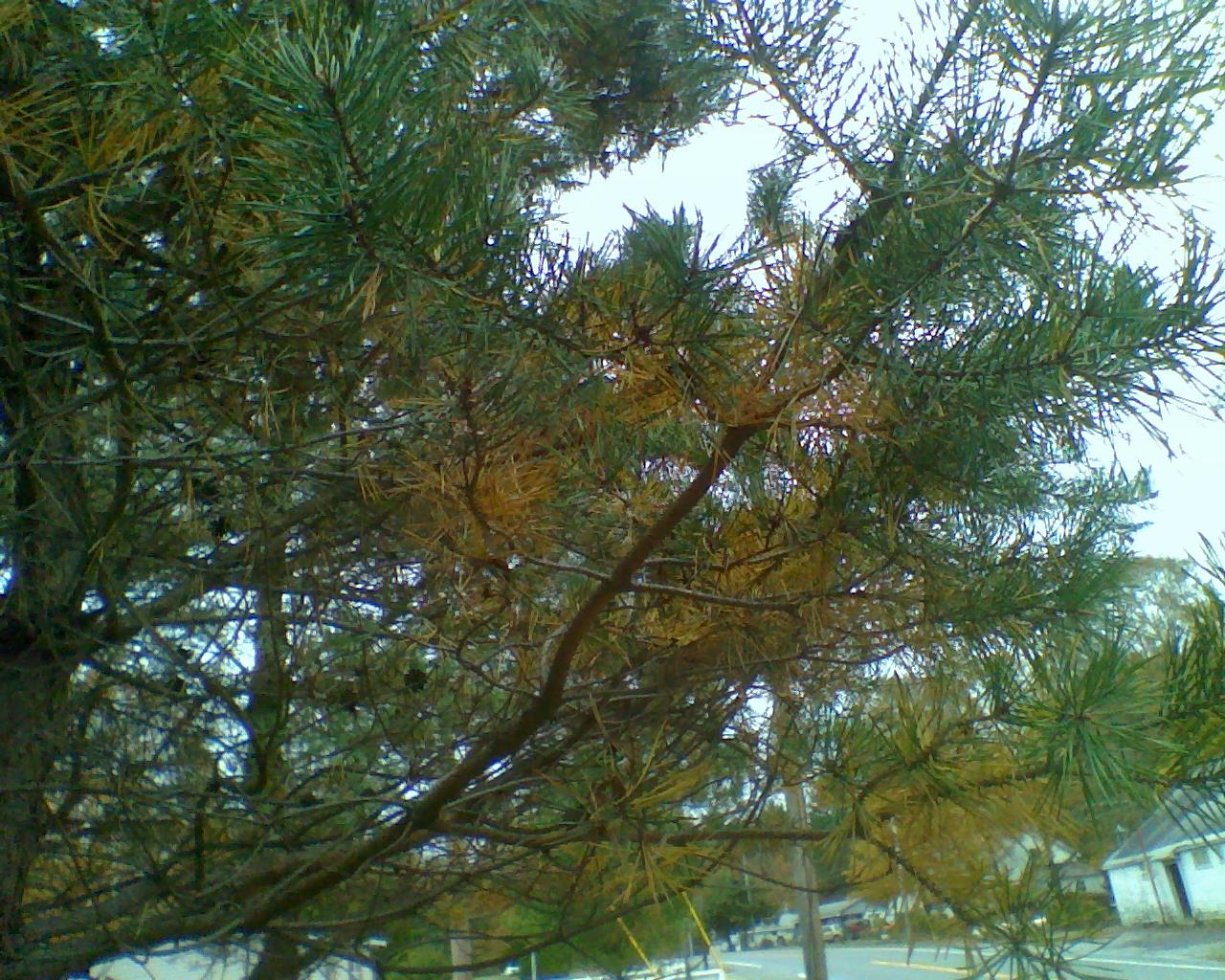
Red pine boughs, showing yellowing and abscission of older foliage in the autumn.

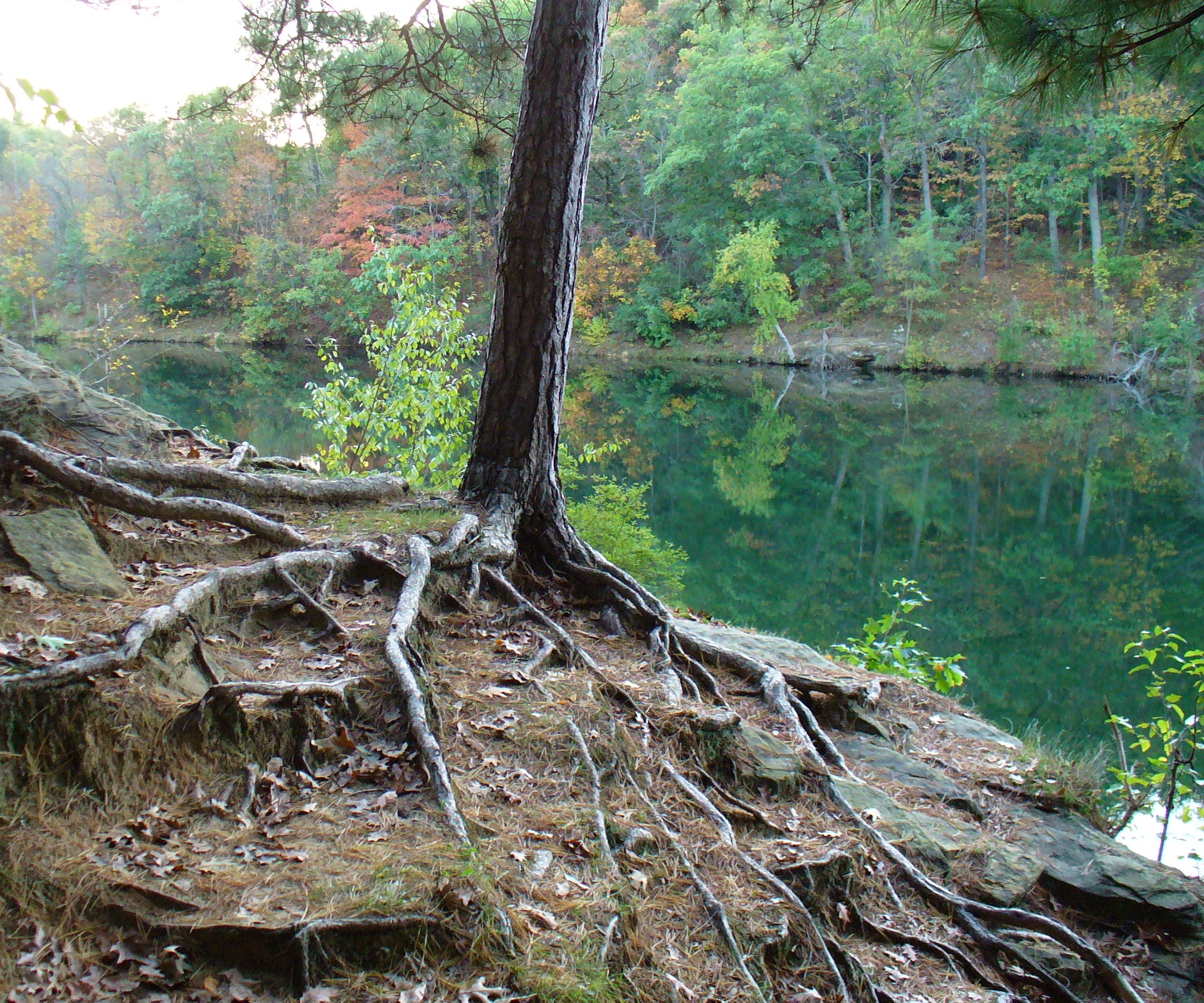
Tree roots anchor the structure and provide water and nutrients. The ground has eroded away around the roots of this young red pine tree.

== Distribution and habitat ==
It occurs from Newfoundland west to Manitoba, and south to Pennsylvania, with several smaller, disjunct populations occurring in the Appalachian Mountains in Virginia and West Virginia, as well as a few small pockets in extreme northern New Jersey and northern Illinois. It can be found in a variety of habitats, predominantly in cool-temperate, hemiboreal and southern-mid boreal forests, with sparse populations found further north and south.

== Ecology ==
It is extremely intolerant of shade, but does well in windy sites; it grows best in well-drained soil. It is a long-lived tree, reaching a maximum age of about 500 years.

It produces extremely large quantities of turpentine-rich resin to heal injuries and ward off/kill pests, with its scientific epithet resinosa (meaning "resinous" or "full of resin" in Latin) reflecting such quality.

As a pioneer tree, red pines use their partially fire-resistant bark to survive small-to-medium forest fires. These fires clear out leaf litter and competing trees/saplings, allowing the pine's offspring to grow with more sun access.

== Uses ==
The wood is commercially valuable in forestry for timber and paper pulp, and the tree is also used for landscaping. The wood is light, hard, and very close grained. It is not durable in contact with soil without chemical treatment. It is used in construction for piling, masts, spars, boxes, and crates.

The resin from the tree is often refined into rosin and turpentine. The rosin is used in a variety of cosmetics, crafts (such as candles) and as a natural, waterproof sealant/finish. Turpentine is used as a strong solvent, paint thinner and varnish, but it is extremely volatile and can cause fires/poisioning when mishandled. In its raw form, red pine resin can also be used as a fire starter and natural bandage due to its flammability and antiseptic properties respectively.

== In culture ==
The red pine is Minnesota's state tree. In Minnesota the use of the name "Norway" may stem from early Scandinavian immigrants who likened the American red pines to the Scots pines back home.
