= Western Great Lakes forests =

Temperate broadleaf and mixed forest ecoregion in Canada and the United States

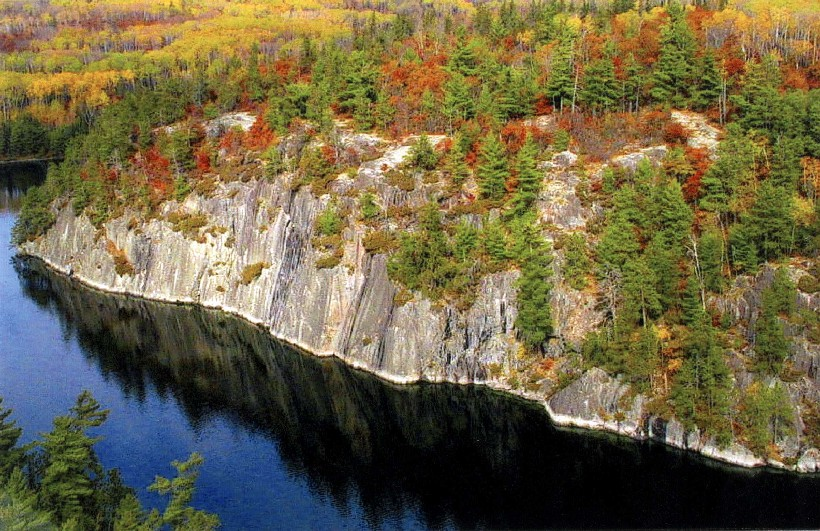
- Autumn colours in the Boundary Waters region of Minnesota and Ontario

Ecology
- Realm: Nearctic
- Biome: Temperate broadleaf and mixed forests, Hemiboreal/boreal forests
- Borders: List: Canadian aspen forests and parklands; Central Canadian Shield forests; Eastern forest-boreal transition; Eastern Great Lakes lowland forests; Midwestern Canadian Shield forests; Northern tall grasslands; Upper Midwest forest-savanna transition; Southern Great Lakes forests
- Bird species: 216
- Mammal species: 64

Geography
- Area: 274,000 km^{2} (106,000 mi^{2})
- Countries: United States; Canada
- States/Provinces: Michigan; Wisconsin; Minnesota; Ontario; Manitoba
- Climate type: Humid continental (Dfb)

Conservation
- Conservation status: Relatively Stable/Intact
- Habitat loss: 2%
- Protected: 32.4%

The Western Great Lakes forests is a terrestrial ecoregion as defined by the World Wildlife Fund. It is within the temperate broadleaf and mixed forests biome of North America, as well as the southernmost areas of the boreal forest. It is found in northern areas of the United States' states of Michigan, Wisconsin and Minnesota, and in southern areas of the Canadian province of Manitoba and northwestern areas of the province of Ontario.

== Setting ==
The Western Great Lakes forests, in large part, lie in the northwestern Great Lakes Basin near the shores of Lake Huron, Lake Michigan and Lake Superior, including the entire Upper Peninsula of Michigan and large parts of Northern Wisconsin, around Lake Superior into much of northern Minnesota and a smaller section into Canada. In the west, the ecoregion surrounds the lakes and rivers that divide Minnesota from Ontario, including Lake of the Woods and Rainy River, and it extends near the Winnipeg River into southeastern Manitoba.

This region has warm summers and cold, snowy winters. This region is generally similar in climate and condition to the Eastern forest-boreal transition to its east, except that it is generally somewhat drier (the prevailing winds blow west to east and drier air from the plains comes here first before it picks up moisture over the lakes) and, especially in its southern and central areas, its soil is much thicker and less acidic, which makes for more varied vegetation.

== Flora ==
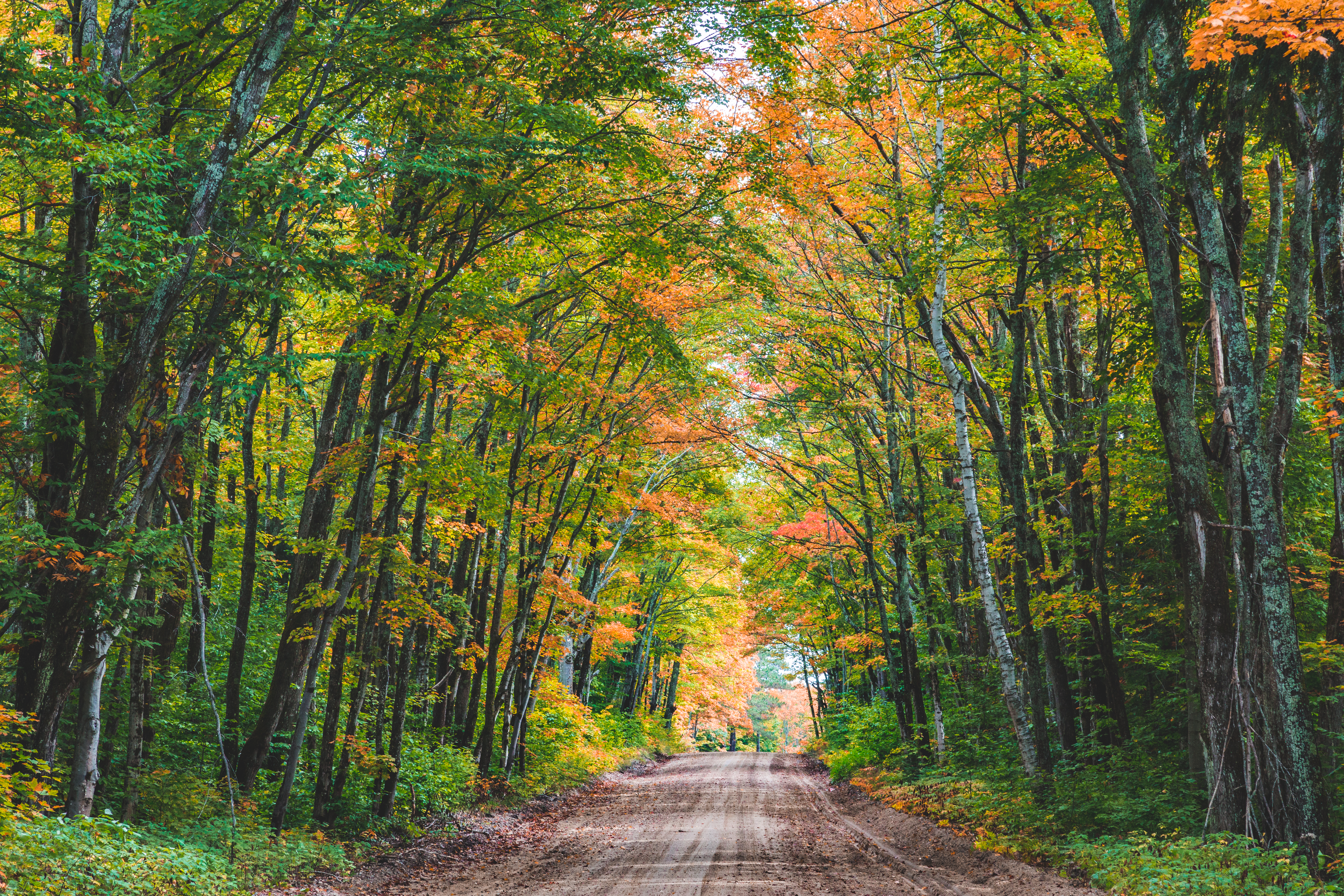
Sugar maple-paper birch forest in Hiawatha National Forest, Michigan

This ecoregion is a transition area between the taiga (Boreal forest) to the north and the temperate deciduous forest and tallgrass prairie to the south and west and thus contains a variety of habitats including northern coniferous forests, northern hardwood forest, boreal hardwood-conifer forest, swamp forest, and peatland, in addition to freshwater marshes, bogs, fens, and hardwood river basins and conifer swamps, and large hardwood and conifer stands. Trees of the woodland include White pine (Pinus strobus) and Red pine (Pinus resinosa) with paper birch (Betula papyrifera) and Quaking aspen, and Jack pine (Pinus banksiana) forests, Black spruce (Picea mariana), white spruce (Picea glauca), balsam fir (Abies balsamifera), Tamarack (Larix laricina), Northern white cedar (Thuja occidentalis), Northern pin oak (Quercus ellipsoidalis), and hazel (Corylus cornuta). "Common species of the northern hardwoods include sugar maple (Acer saccharum), red maple (Acer rubrum), American beech (Fagus grandifolia), hop hornbeam (Ostrya virginiana), basswood (Tilia americana), yellow birch (Betula alleghaniensis) and eastern hemlock (Tsuga canadensis)" and Northern pin oak (Quercus ellipsoidalis).

== Fauna ==
The Western Great Lakes forests are very rich in wildlife. Wildlife "include moose (Alces alces), black bear (Ursus americanus), lynx (Lynx canadensis), snowshoe hare (Lepus americanus), white-tailed deer (Odocoileus virginianus), and woodchuck (Marmota monax). Bird species include ruffed grouse (Bonasa umbellus), hooded merganser (Lophodytes cucullatus), pileated woodpecker (Dryocopus pileatus), bald eagle (Haleaeetus leucocephalus), turkey vulture (Cathartes aura), herring gull (Larus argentatus), and waterfowl. American black duck (Anas rubripes) and wood duck (Aix sponsa) occur in the eastern part of the ecoregion." After being nearly extirpated from the conterminous United States, gray wolves (Canis lupus) survived in the remote northeastern corner of Minnesota and Ontario. The repopulation of wolves in this region has occurred naturally as they have expanded their territory.

== Threats and use ==
While the area does now have large protected sections, historically logging (especially of pine wood) has changed many sections and continues today. Agricultural development, especially orchards in Lower Michigan has also reduced the habitat. In addition, the establishment of roads and lakeside homes significantly impacts the forests.

== Protected areas ==
Large protected areas of the Western Great Lakes forests include:

- Boundary Waters Canoe Area Wilderness, northern Minnesota
- Quetico Provincial Park, northwestern Ontario - 4,758.19 km2
- Voyageurs National Park, northern Minnesota
- Isle Royale National Park, northern Michigan
- Apostle Islands National Lakeshore, northern Wisconsin
- Porcupine Mountains State Park - northern Michigan
- Turtle River Waterway Provincial Park - northwestern Ontario- 400.52 km2
- La Verendrye Provincial Waterway Park - northwestern Ontario - 183.35 km2
- Whiteshell Provincial Park - Manitoba (Backcountry zones) - 913 km2
- Nopiming Provincial Park - Manitoba (Backcountry zones) - 316 km2
- Lake of the Woods Provincial Park, northwestern Ontario - 129 km2
- Lola Lake Provincial Nature Reserve, northwestern Ontario - 65.72 km2
- Sandbar Lake Provincial Park, northwestern Ontario - 50.83 km2
- Winnange Lake Provincial Park, northwestern Ontario - 47.45 km2
- Portions of the United States National Forests (Wilderness Areas, RNAs, etc.) also provide protection (see e.g. Superior National Forest, Chequamegon-Nicolet National Forest)

== See also ==
- List of ecoregions in Canada (WWF)
- List of ecoregions in the United States (WWF)
- Upper Midwest forest-savanna transition
