= List of ecoregions in the United States (EPA) =

This list provides an overview of United States ecoregions designated by the U.S. Environmental Protection Agency (EPA) and the Commission for Environmental Cooperation (CEC). The CEC was established in 1994 by the member states of Canada, Mexico, and the United States to address regional environmental concerns under the North American Agreement on Environmental Cooperation (NAAEC), the environmental side accord to the North American Free Trade Agreement (NAFTA). The Commission's 1997 report, Ecological Regions of North America, provides a framework that may be used by government agencies, non-governmental organizations, and academic researchers as a basis for risk analysis, resource management, and environmental study of the continent's ecosystems. In the United States, the EPA and the United States Geological Survey (USGS) are the principal federal agencies working with the CEC to define and map ecoregions. Ecoregions may be identified by similarities in geology, physiography, vegetation, climate, soils, land use, wildlife distributions, and hydrology.

The classification system has four levels, but only Levels I and III are on this list. Level I divides North America into 15 broad ecoregions; of these, 12 lie partly or wholly within the United States. Fifty Level II regions were created to allow for a narrower delineation of Level I areas. Three level I areas were not subdivided for level 2. Level III subdivides the continent into 182 smaller ecoregions; of these, 104 lie partly or wholly with the United States. Level IV is a further subdivision of Level III ecoregions. Level IV mapping is still underway but is complete across most of the United States. For an example of Level IV data, see List of ecoregions in Oregon and the associated articles. The classification system excludes the U.S. state of Hawaii, which is not part of the North American continent.

== Ecoregions in the United States ==
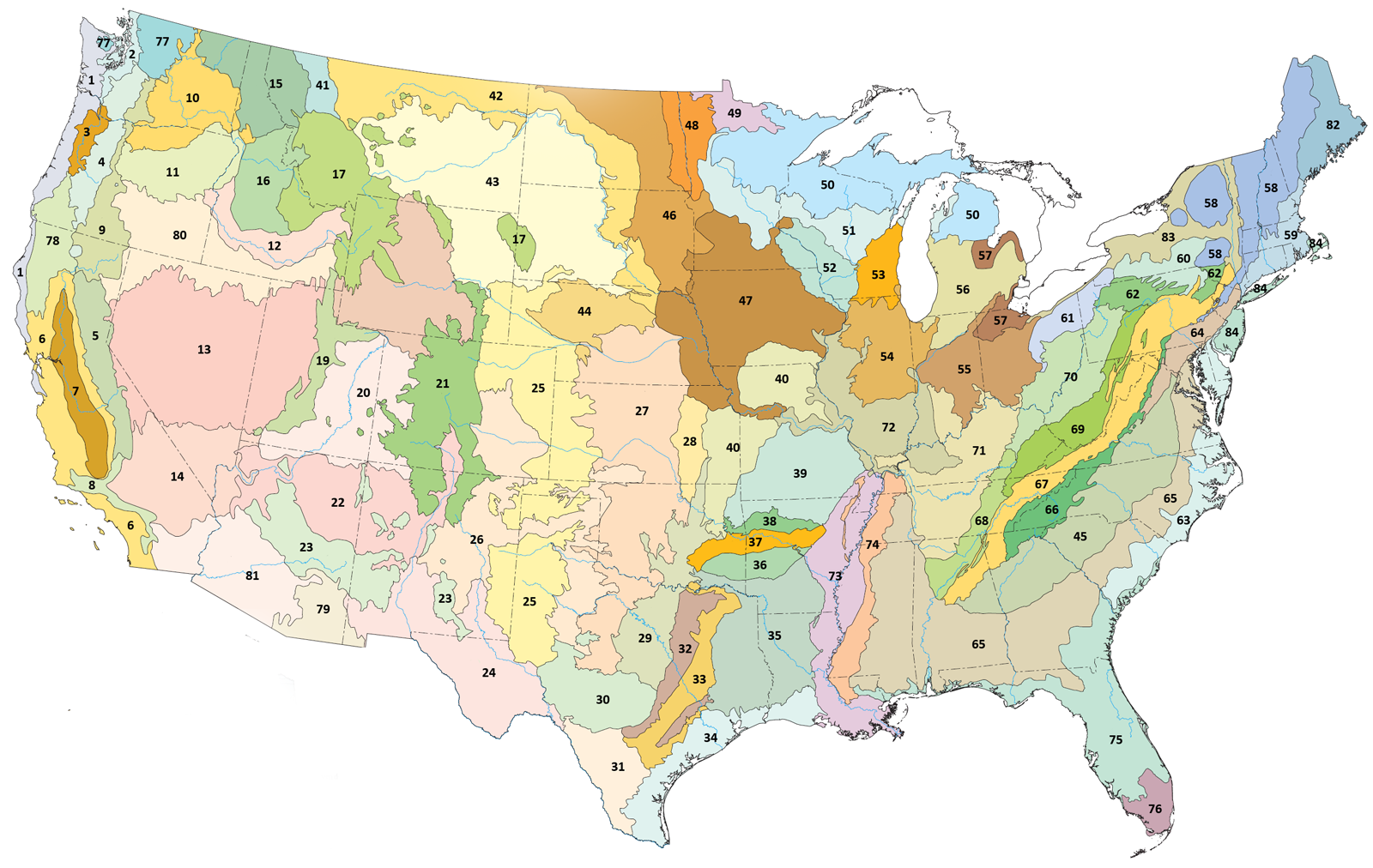
Level III ecoregions in the contiguous United States. Alaska ecoregions (102-120) not shown.

=== Marine West Coast Forest ===
- 1 Coast Range
- 2 Puget Lowland
- 3 Willamette Valley
- 111 Ahklun Mountains and Kilbuck Mountains
- 113 Alaska Peninsula Mountains
- 115 Cook Inlet
- 119 Pacific Coastal Mountains
- 120 Coastal Western Hemlock-Sitka Spruce Forests

The corresponding CEC ecoregion in Canada is called the Pacific Maritime Ecozone.

=== Western Forested Mountains ===
- 4 Cascades
- 5 Sierra Nevada
- 9 Eastern Cascades Slopes and Foothills
- 11 Blue Mountains
- 15 Northern Rockies
- 16 Idaho Batholith
- 17 Middle Rockies
- 19 Wasatch and Uinta Mountains
- 21 Southern Rockies
- 41 Canadian Rockies
- 77 North Cascades
- 78 Klamath Mountains
- 105 Interior Highlands
- 116 Alaska Range
- 117 Copper Plateau
- 118 Wrangell Mountains

The corresponding CEC ecoregion in Canada is called the Montane Cordillera Ecozone.

=== Mediterranean California ===
- 6 Southern and Central California Chaparral and Oak Woodlands
- 7 Central California Valley
- 8 Southern California Mountains

=== North American Deserts ===
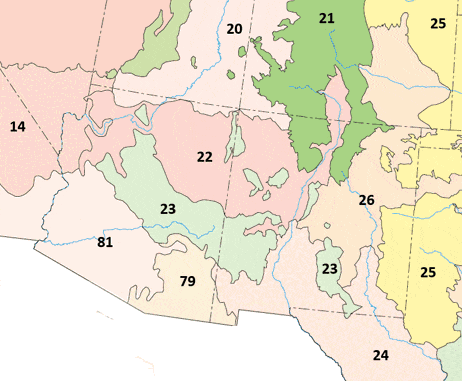
Some of the deserts and plains

- 10 Columbia Plateau
- 12 Snake River Plain
- 13 Central Basin and Range
- 14 Mojave Basin and Range
- 18 Wyoming Basin
- 20 Colorado Plateaus
- 22 Arizona/New Mexico Plateau
- 24 Chihuahuan Deserts
- 80 Northern Basin and Range
- 81 Sonoran Basin and Range

=== Temperate Sierras ===
- 23 Arizona/New Mexico Mountains

=== Great Plains ===
- 25 Western High Plains
- 26 Southwestern Tablelands
- 27 Central Great Plains
- 28 Flint Hills
- 29 Central Oklahoma/Texas Plains
- 30 Edwards Plateau
- 31 Southern Texas Plains
- 40 Central Irregular Plains
- 42 Northwestern Glaciated Plains
- 43 Northwestern Great Plains
- 44 Nebraska Sand Hills
- 46 Northern Glaciated Plains
- 47 Western Corn Belt Plains
- 48 Lake Agassiz Plain

The corresponding name in Canada for the same ecoregion is the Prairies Ecozone.

=== Eastern Temperate Forest ===
These forests stretch from the Southern Appalachians towards Canada, up to the northern Midwest. For a general description of these forests, refer to Temperate Deciduous Forest. The standard reference is The Deciduous Forest of Eastern North America. The adjoining forests in Canada are generally referred to as the Mixedwood Plains Ecozone or the Great Lakes-St.Lawrence Forest Region.

- 32 Texas Blackland Prairies
- 33 East Central Texas Plains
- 34 Western Gulf Coastal Plain
- 36 Ouachita Mountains
- 37 Arkansas Valley
- 38 Boston Mountains
- 39 Ozark Highlands
- 45 Piedmont
- 51 North Central Hardwood Forests
- 52 Driftless Area
- 53 Southeastern Wisconsin Till Plains
- 54 Central Corn Belt Plains
- 55 Eastern Corn Belt Plains
- 56 Southern Michigan/Northern Indiana Drift Plains
- 57 Huron/Erie Lake Plains
- 58 Northeastern Highlands
- 59 Northeastern Coastal Zone
- 60 Northern Appalachian Plateau and Uplands
- 61 Erie Drift Plain
- 63 Middle Atlantic Coastal Plain
- 64 Northern Piedmont
- 65 Southeastern Plain
- 66 Blue Ridge
- 67 Ridge and Valley
- 68 Southwestern Appalachians
- 69 Central Appalachians
- 70 Western Allegheny Plateau
- 71 Interior Low Plateaus
- 72 Interior River Valleys and Hills
- 74 Mississippi Valley Loess Plains
- 82 Acadian Plains and Hills
- 83 Eastern Great Lakes and Hudson Lowlands
- 84 Atlantic Coastal Pine Barrens

=== Northern Forests ===
- 49 Northern Minnesota Wetlands
- 50 Northern Lakes and Forests
- 58 Northeastern Highlands
- 62 North Central Appalachians

The corresponding name in Canada for the same ecoregions are the Boreal Shield and the Atlantic Maritime Ecozones.

=== Tropical Wet Forests ===
- 76 Southern Florida Coastal Plain

=== Southern Semi-Arid Highlands ===
- 79 Madrean Archipelago

=== Taiga ===
- 101 Arctic Coastal Plain
- 102 Arctic Foothills
- 103 Brooks Range
- 104 Interior Forested Lowlands and Uplands
- 106 Interior Bottomlands
- 107 Yukon Flats
- 108 Ogilvie Mountains

=== Temperate coniferous forest ===
- 35 South Central Plains
- 63 Middle Atlantic Coastal Plain
- 65 Southeastern Plains
- 73 Mississippi Alluvial Plain
- 74 Mississippi Valley Loess Plains
- 75 Southern Coastal Plain

=== Tundra ===
- 109 Subarctic Coastal Plains
- 110 Seward Peninsula
- 112 Bristol Bay-Nushagak Lowlands
- 114 Aleutian Islands

== Listings by state ==
- List of ecoregions in California
- List of ecoregions in Illinois
- List of ecoregions in Indiana
- List of ecoregions in Louisiana
- List of ecoregions in Minnesota
- List of ecoregions in Oregon
- List of ecoregions in Wisconsin

== See also ==
- Ecoregions defined by the Commission for Environmental Cooperation and partner agencies:
  - List of ecoregions in North America (CEC)
  - Ecozones of Canada
- The conservation group World Wildlife Fund maintains an alternate classification system:
  - List of terrestrial ecoregions (WWF)
  - List of ecoregions in the United States (WWF)
  - List of ecoregions in Canada (WWF)
