= State forest =

Forest administered by a state agency

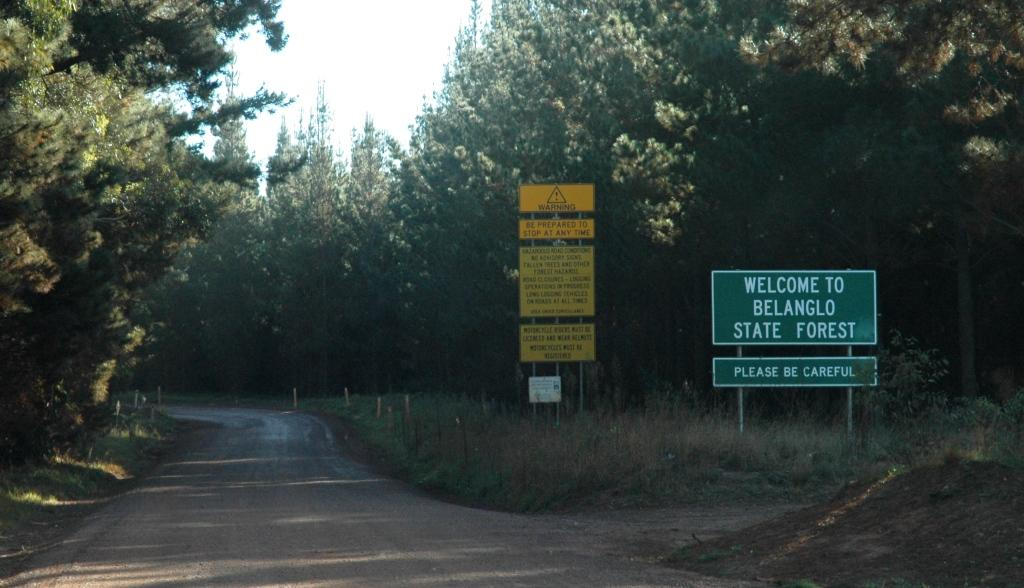
These signs at the entrance to the Belanglo State Forest in Australia advise visitors with instruction and warning.

A state forest or national forest is a forest that is administered or protected by a sovereign or federated state, or territory.

== Background ==
State forests are forests that are administered or protected by some agency of a sovereign or federated state, or territory. The precise application of the terms vary by jurisdiction. For example:

- In Australia, a state forest is a forest that is protected by state laws, rather than by the Government of Australia.
- In Austria, the state forests are managed by the Austrian State Forestry Commission
- In Brazil, a national forest is a protected area for sustainability
- In Canada, provinces administer provincial forests
- In France, a national forest is a forest owned by the French state
- In Germany, state forests are either federal forest called the Bundesforst, which is controlled by the Institute for Federal Real Estate (Bundesforstverwaltung), or forest of the Länder called Landesforste
- In Iceland, forests managed by the Icelandic Forest Service are classified as national forests.
- In New Zealand, a state forest is a forest that is controlled by the Ministry for Primary Industries.
- In Poland, state-owned forests are managed by the State Forests agency
- In Turkey, a state forest (devlet ormanı) is a forest that its boundaries have been defined by deed covenants. As pursuant to the Article 169 of the Constitution of Turkey, state forests are owned and managed by the Turkish state. The forests are managed by the General Directorate of Forestry, a government agency connected to the Ministry of Agriculture and Forestry.
- In the United Kingdom, a state forest is any forest (usually plantations) owned and managed by the Forestry Commission. England also has The National Forest project
- In the United States, a state forest is a forest owned by one of the individual states while a national forest is owned by the federal government

== Purposes ==
The purpose of a state forest varies between countries and the quality of the landscape it covers. In many places, state forests are divided into land for logging plantations, area for conservation, area for livestock grazing, and area for visitor recreation. As an example, in the state of California, the Redwood National and State Parks are a string of protected forests, beaches, and grasslands along Northern California's coast; these are owned by both the U.S. federal government and the State of California.

== See also ==
- List of types of formally designated forests
- Provincial forest
- State park
- Open space reserve
- Regional park
