= Eastern Temperate Forests =

Ecoregion of North America

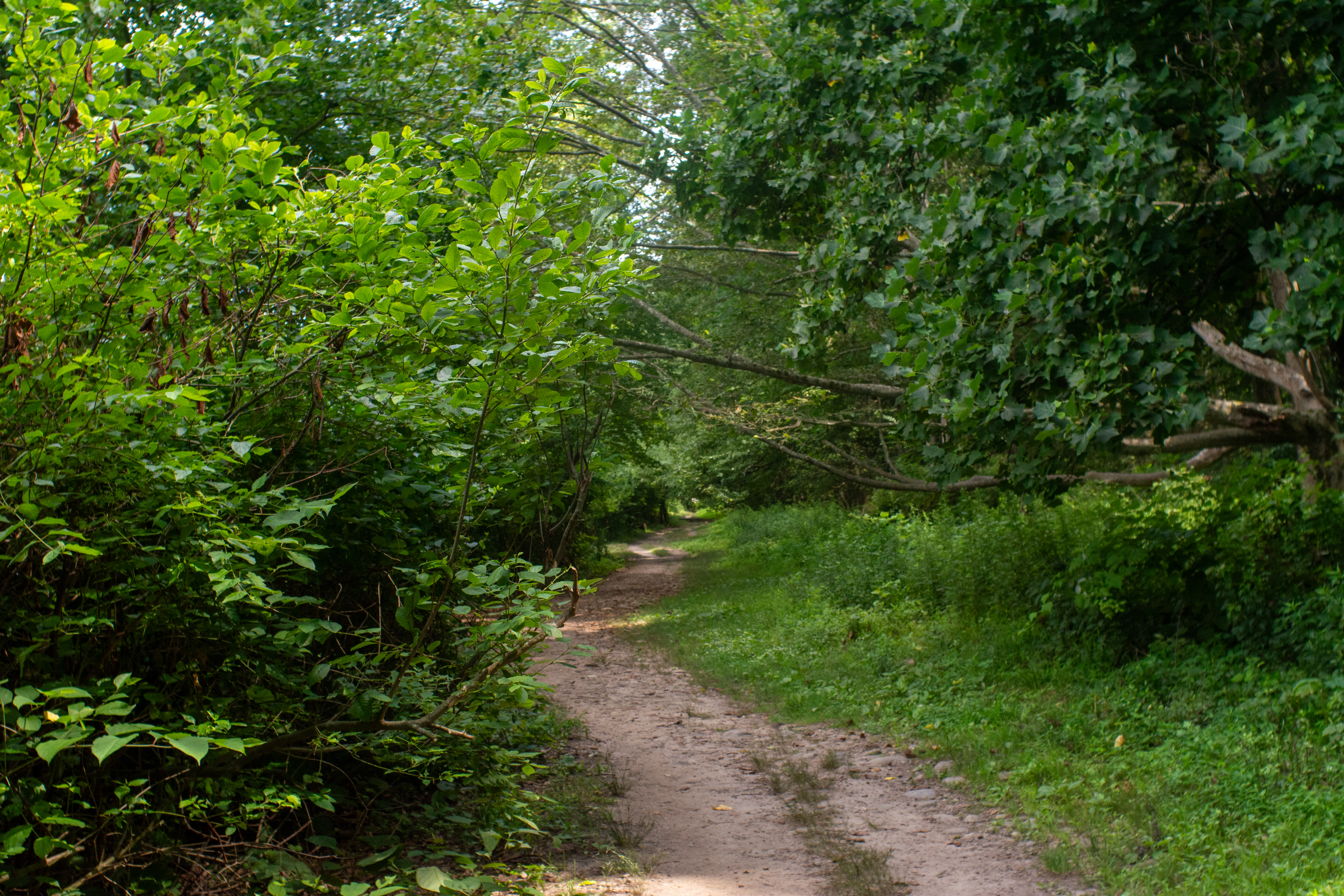
- Forests near Lake Mohegan in Fairfield, Connecticut

- The eastern temperate forests in North America are highlighted in light green.

Ecology
- Realm: Nearctic
- Biome: Temperate broadleaf and mixed forests

Geography
- Countries: Canada; United States

The Eastern Temperate Forests is a Level I ecoregion of North America designated by the Commission for Environmental Cooperation (CEC) in its North American Environmental Atlas. The region covers much of the Eastern and Midwestern United States, the U.S. Interior Highlands, and parts of Ontario, Quebec, and the Maritimes.

== Description ==
The Eastern Temperate Forests of North America are a vast and diverse region. Stretching inland from the Atlantic coast about 385 miles (620 km), they reach from Michigan in the north and Texas in the south; they cover the land of New England to Florida, Alabama to Michigan, and Missouri to the Appalachian Mountains. This ecoregion enjoys a mild and moist climate, though it is generally warmer as latitude decreases and drier as longitude increases.

Warm summers and mild to cool winters have provided favorable growing conditions for a number of plant species, the dominant being large, broadleaf, deciduous trees and (to a lesser extent) needle-leaf, coniferous, evergreen trees. Indeed, before the arrival of Europeans, this area was almost completely forested. After their arrival a few centuries ago, much of the eastern forests had been cleared for timber and to make way for cropland. In more recent time, however, these open areas have been abandoned and are slowly returning to forest.

Although heavily influenced by people, the Eastern Temperate Forests have proven to be a very resilient region; these great forests still provide habitat for many birds, animals, reptiles, amphibians, and insects, as well as recreational and economic benefits for the people of the region.

== Climate ==
The Eastern Temperate Forest region has a wide range of fluctuating temperatures dependent on time of year. In this region, there are four distinct seasons- winter, spring, summer, and fall. This seasonal variation is caused by exposure to both warm and cold air masses due to the biomes mid-latitude positioning between the polar regions and the tropics and is reflected in both the seasonal temperatures and precipitation levels. The highest temperatures, averaging 21 °C, occur during the summer months of July and August, and the lowest temperatures, averaging 0 °C, occur during the winter months of December, January, and February. The year-round average temperature within the region is 10 °C.

Levels of precipitation vary with the seasons as well, with the highest levels of precipitation, averaging 95 mm/month, occurring in May and August, and the lowest, averaging 60 mm/month, occurring in June and the winter months of January, February, March, and December. The Eastern Temperate Forest region can thus be described as "warm, humid, and temperate" with abundant levels of precipitation year-round.

There are many global patterns that affect and contribute to the climate of the Eastern Temperate Forest region, such as global ocean currents, El Nino, La Nina, the Gulf Stream current, and global air circulation patterns. El Niño, caused by warmer sea-surface temperatures in the Pacific Ocean, can lead to "wet winters" and warm episodes occurring between the months of December and February in the southeastern region of the United States Eastern Temperate Forest. La Niña is caused by cooler than normal sea-surface temperatures in the central and eastern tropical Pacific Ocean, it leads to drier than normal conditions in the winter months in the Southeast region of the Eastern Temperate Forest.

The global ocean current that affects the Eastern Temperate Forest most is the Gulf Stream current which brings a warm flow of water from South to North along the eastern coast of North America in the Atlantic Ocean, it keeps temperatures in this region relatively warm. The winds that have the greatest effect on the climate of the region are the prevailing westerlies and the tropical easterlies. The prevailing westerlies, caused by the Coriolis Effect, explain why most major events that occur in North America come from the west and proceed east, which is where the majority of the Eastern Temperate Forest is located.

== Ecology ==
=== Flora ===
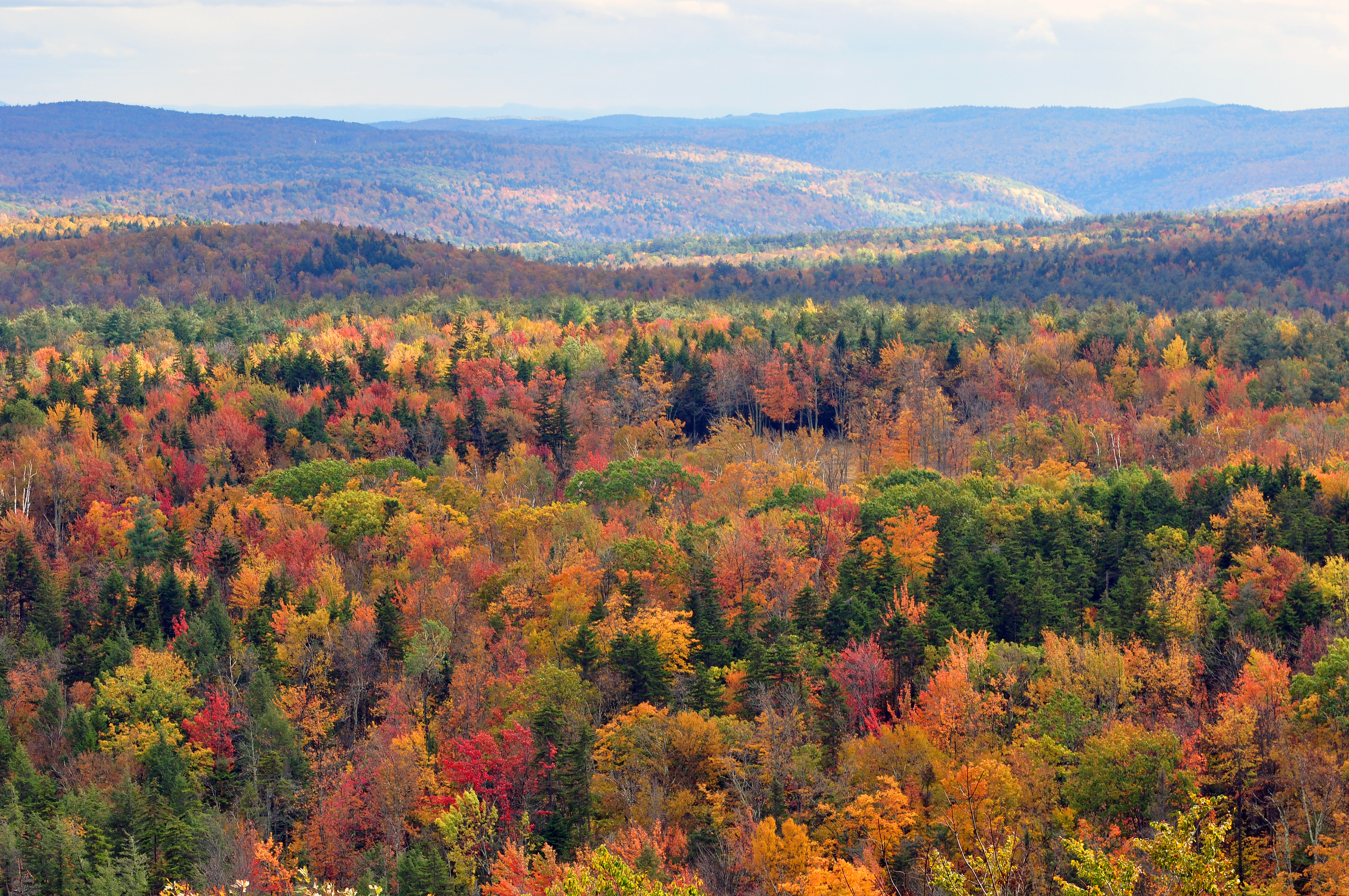
Fall foliage of the Eastern Temperate Forests at Hogback Mountain, Vermont.

The Eastern Temperate Forest Ecoregion has favorable growing conditions for a number of plant species, the dominant being large, broadleaf, deciduous trees. Before the arrival of Europeans, this area was almost completely forested. After their arrival a few centuries ago, much of these forests had been cleared for timber and to make way for cropland.

In more recent time, however, these open areas have been abandoned and are slowly returning to forest. Of the many plant species that inhabit the Eastern Temperate Forests today, those of the oak (Quercus), beech (Fagus), maple (Acer), basswood (Tilia), and pine (Pinus) genera are the most characteristic and defining of this ecoregion.

These plants can be broken down into several main communities: northern hardwood, beech-maple, maple-basswood, mixed mesophytic, oak-hickory, and southern mixed hardwood forests. With the exception of Pinus, all of these species are angiosperms, meaning that they produce flowers and fruits, an important food source to many animals who inhabit the region. The flowers of angiosperms provide nectar, their leaves are important vegetable matter for herbivores, and their seeds are rich in fat and protein rich that allow many animals to fatten up for their winter hibernation.

=== Fauna ===
Arboreal species are widely found in the region due to the high density of tree cover, providing a suitable habitat and food source for the animals; this includes birds and many ground squirrels. Migratory songbirds are common in the eastern temperate forests once the canopy opens up in the spring. Mammals that are native to the eastern forests are white-tailed deer, black bears, ground squirrels (gray squirrels and chipmunks), as well as red and grey foxes. Bird species include the black-throated warbler, piping plover, and the yellow- breasted chat. An amphibious species that is common to the region is the American toad and a reptilian species is the box turtle.

White-tailed deer populations are very large across the eastern US, making it both a dominant and defining species. The white-tailed deer competes with other herbivores for limited food resources directly affecting the ecosystem, as well as indirectly affecting the area by altering habitats for small vertebrates and mammals. According to the Virginia Journal of Science's research on white-tailed deer, deer are grazers primarily, feeding on the leaves of shrubs and such; however in the winter months they are found browsing the woody stems of shrubs and saplings. White-tailed deer have four stomachs, each with their own specific digestive action. The complex breaking down of food allows the deer to eat woody plants and other things that most animals cannot digest. Areas with high deer populations, will see a dramatic shift in forest cover because small saplings and shrubs growth will be retarded and hindered due to their browsing habits. White tailed deer are polygamous; in the northern parts of the region they will mate in November and for more southern dwelling populations mating occurs in January. A female will give birth to one to three fawns, after a 6-month gestation period. After about 3 months, the young will leave their parents. White tailed deer typically live about three years but can live up to 15 years. White-tailed deer exemplify a "k-selection" species. They have long gestation periods, can reproduce more than once in a lifetime and are only a few offspring are produced at once.

== Endangered species ==
The United States has more endangered species than all of the other continents combined, the Eastern Temperate Forest's endangered and threatened species make up a little less than a quarter of that number. Endangered and threatened mammals (but not limited to) include, the Louisiana black bear, the red wolf, the Key deer, the eastern puma (cougar) the West Indian manatee, the North Atlantic right whale, the Mississippi sandhill crane, the piping plover, and the leatherback sea turtle. Endangered and threatened flowering/non-flowering plants include, the Virginia round-leaf birch, the Tennessee yellow-eyed grass, the Michaux's sumac, the Florida torreya and the Louisiana quillwort, among many others. The region is also home to the only two endangered lichen species, rock gnome lichen and Florida perforate reindeer lichen.

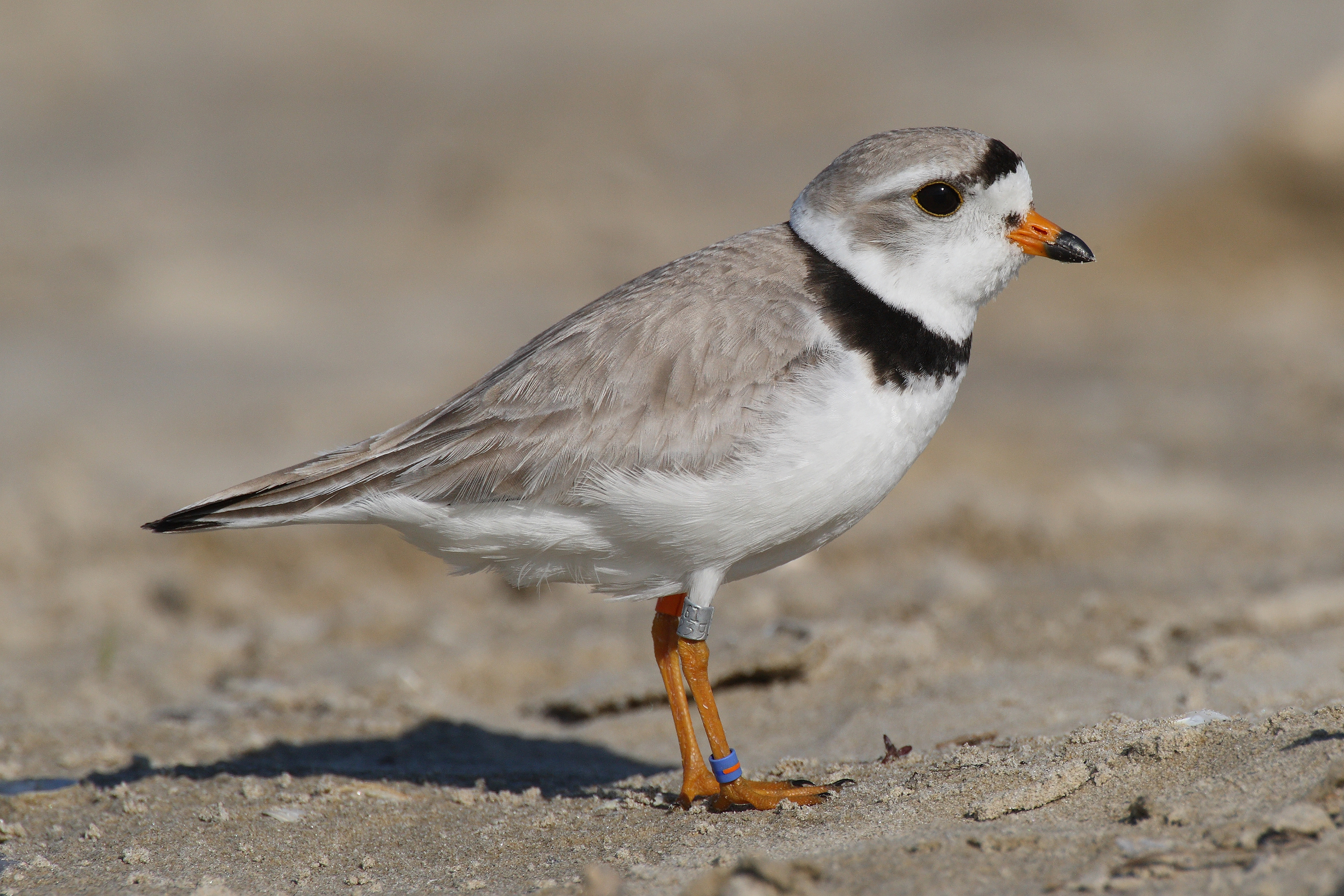
Piping plover, Charadrius melodus

The piping plover is a bird that has been on the endangered species list since 1985 in the Great Lakes watershed (including: NY, PA, IL, MI, and WI.) This species nearly became extinct after over hunting in the 19th and early 20th century due to use of feathers for fashion hats. Current potential sources of endangerment include, the development of coastlines for recreation, and detrimental material washing up to shore. The management of the habitat sites, closing off sections of the beach where birds are nesting, creation of a mimic habitat, predation management, restriction of beach vehicles, and vegetation control are current conservation efforts being enforced.

The Louisiana quillwort has been on the list of endangered species since 1992; contrary to its name it is only now found in MI and AL. Threats to this species include, pollution (herbicides and chemicals), construction in proximity to stream, vehicle traffic on or near stream, changes in flow rate and erosion (these two factors most likely caused from climate change). Conservation efforts being enforces are, updates to where the population status is, permanently protecting existing habitats (through local and federal levels), look for potential populations that are not accounted for, preserve the genetic stock of the species remaining, and more in-depth habitat studies leading to population fluctuation.

== Geology, topography, and soils ==
The Appalachian Mountains are a main topic of research, regarding the geology of the surrounding area. They formed when the ancestral continents of North America and Africa collided together and are about 480 million years old. The folded and thrust faulted igneous rocks, marine sedimentary rock and rocks that look like that of the ancient ocean floor, reveal that they got pushed up during plate collisions. Ice ages, during the Pleistocene epoch (after the Appalachians formed), contributed a great deal to the current appearance of the surrounding area. Surfaces that were once covered by ice were eroded and smoothed out during glacier movement. Therefore, the Appalachians were much taller when they formed than they are today. Glaciers also deposited parent materials of the underlying bedrocks, which contribute to the formation of soils later on.

There are very clear soil horizons, when looking at a cross section of this land. These are labeled and described (see Figure 2) as: O: organic matter, A: fine particles of organic matter and mineral material, B: material layer where most nutrients accumulate, C: parent material, and R: bedrock1. The U.S. Soil Taxonomy classifies Inceptisols, Mollisols, and Spodosols as good soils that can support temperate forests that like mature soils that can support deep root systems1. Different levels of nitrogen also have a big effect on a soils capability of supporting life. The presence of too much nitrogen can cause declines in species richness and abundance. The types of vegetation that exist in the Appalachian area heavily rely on the existing soil types and amount of nutrients available.

== Traditional and emerging natural resources ==
The Eastern Temperate region has a vast wealth of natural resources that are utilized by people. The two most common traditional resources include timber and coal. Timber specifically hardwoods, which make up the majority of timber from this region, are utilized widely for furniture production. In 1997 there was about 6 billion dollars' worth of solid wood exports with 36% coming from the eastern United States. Coal is the other major traditional resource of the region. Coal is found on the western slopes of the Appalachian mountain range as well as in parts of Illinois and Indiana. In 2003 U.S. coal production was about 1.07 billion short tons and while not all of this comes from the eastern region a large portion of it does as 6 of the top 10 coal producing states are from within this region as of 2012.

Natural gas and oil from hydraulic fracturing are a new emerging resource from the region. "Fracking," as it is commonly known, involves sending pressurized water or sand into shale deposits in order to open up more cracks, which natural gas and oil can flow through, into pipes and out of the ground. There were 8,982 drills as of 2011 in Pennsylvania alone that operated under hydraulic fracturing. Though this is a new resource for the region, it is also extremely controversial as oil and gas from the "fracking" process can sometimes seep into ground water and contaminate it.

== Current environmental threats/ Impact of climate change ==
There are three major current threats to the Eastern Temperate Forest. These include agriculture, invasive species and overpopulation/urbanization. A major use of land in the eastern temperate forest is for agricultural purposes due to the rich soils which are easily converted to farmland. Pesticides in particular threaten the health of the eastern temperate forest region because they are used in massive quantities for agricultural production but are also widely popular in homes, businesses, schools, hospitals, and parks to maintain lawns or fields.

Another problem with no easy solution that faces the eastern temperate forest are non-native invasive species like the emerald ash borer. The emerald ash borer is thought to have been introduced to Michigan from China about 15 years ago. The adult beetles target ash trees as places to lay their eggs, when the larvae hatch they bore through the bark and kill the tree. The health of the ash population is of major concern because they provide habitat for many wildlife species and edible seeds for birds, mammals, and insects.

The biggest threat besides climate change to the eastern temperate forest is its high density of human inhabitants. According to the Commission for Environmental Cooperation approximately 160 million people or over 40 percent of North America's population, lives within the ecological region of the eastern temperate forest12. Such population density can be attributed to the concentration of the continents economic, political, and industrial power in this region. Major cities and sprawling suburban communities between them have drastically changed the regions landscape and fragmented local habitat. Roads and highways divide habitat and limit migration while urbanization and deforestation eliminate suitable habitat and food sources. Studies conducted by Kansas State University have shown that fragmentation can decrease population productivity by isolating populations, crowding species, and causing edge effect.

As the planet faces more intense and severe effects of climate changes, each element of the eastern temperate region will be affected, from flora and fauna, to soil and water. Vegetation mortality, soil content, species existence, water levels, and overall functionality of the Eco region will continue to change and be altered as global warming and the concentration of greenhouse gases increases. Climate change correlates with disturbances such as insect outbreaks, harsh weather, and susceptibility of forests to invasive species, all of which can affect the functions of a forest. Insect breakouts can completely destroy an entire habitat within one season. With increased drought and higher temperatures, the weakened forest can suffer from multiple tree species loss, along with the loss of animals and creatures that serve vital predatory roles within the ecosystem. Plants that are considered to be moist-forest herbs, such as Cohoosh and Clintonia, are threatened by the lack of available water that is vital to their survival. As climate change more rapidly progresses, temperature increases will affect the length of the growing season. Tree species growing range will shift to adapt to the new climates, typically moving to higher altitudes or more northern regions. For example, mountaintop tree species like the red spruce will potentially die out because there is no higher altitude that is available for relocation.

In addition to the northern migration, southern species such as the red oak have expanded their territories. Therefore, as species that thrive in the lower areas of the region are expanding into a greater space, they are beginning to compete for resources and nutrients with pre-existing native species. This can be said for many bird species as well. A study conducted by the USDA Forest Service confirms that 27 out of 38 bird species that inhabit eastern temperate forests, have expanded their territory further north. The water cycle is also incredibly susceptible to the effects of climate change. The water quality and ecosystems within lakes, streams, and rivers are all greatly affected by the alterations of precipitation patterns. Increases in runoff potentially increase the chemical contents within the water, such as nitrate and acid pulses.

Aquatic species are stressed by not only the warmer temperatures themselves, but also the low flows and timing of ice-outs and thaws. Such factors affect oxygenation cycles, productive cycles, and reproductive cycles. Seeing as though the Eastern Temperate Forest region is considered to be a significant evolutionary zone for fauna, the effects of climate change can substantially alter the balances and chains of not only the Ecoregion, but the planet as well.

== Level II ecoregions ==
The Eastern Temperate Forest ecoregion is divided into five Level II ecoregions: Mixed Wood plains, Central USA plains, Southeastern USA plains, Ozark and Ouachita- Appalachian Forests, and Mississippi Alluvial and Southeastern Coastal Plains.

The land formation of the 490,590 square kilometres (189,420 sq mi) area of the Mixed Wood plains is predominantly plains, with some hills, and the bodies of water are many small lakes. The surface materials of the region are moraines and lacustrine and the soil composition includes forest soils and fine textured soils. The mean annual precipitation of the area ranges from 720–1,200 millimetres (28–47 in) and the mean annual temperature generally varies between 4–10 °C. In this area, human activity includes fruit and dairy agriculture, major urban areas, and some forestry and tourism attractions. The most prominent wildlife observed are white tailed deer, moose, and the grey squirrel, and vegetation includes a wide range of trees such as oak, hickory, maple, beech, and some pine and basswood species.

The second sub-ecoregion is the Central USA Plains, an area of 253,665 square kilometres (97,941 sq mi), that has a landform of smooth plains. The majority of this region's surface material is moraine with some lacustrine, and the soil consists of calcium enriched prairie soils and forest soils on moraine. The climate consists of a mean annual precipitation of 760–1,100 mm and average temperatures varying from 7–13 °C. Human activities largely include corn and soybean agriculture, major urban areas, and local dairy operations. Vegetation is mostly prairie type in the west, but also includes oak, hickory, elm, ash, beech, and maple. White tailed deer, cottontail rabbits, and grey squirrels are the most commonly represented wildlife.

The Southeastern USA plains are the third Level II ecoregion and have a land area of 946,770 square kilometres (365,550 sq mi). The majority of this land consists of irregular plains with low hills, which is made up of predominantly residuum and some loess on weakly developed soils. The climate of this region is an annual precipitation of 1,000–1,600 millimetres (39–63 in) and average temperatures of 13−19 °C. Human activities include predominantly forestry with tobacco, hog, and cotton agriculture, along with major urban areas. There is a wide array of wildlife which can include white-tailed deer, grey squirrels, armadillos, wild turkeys, northern cardinals, and mockingbirds. The vegetation of the area is less diverse and includes oak, hickory, loblolly, and shortleaf pines.

The Ozark and Ouachita-Appalachian Forests region is an area mostly consisting of hills and low mountains, with some wild valleys that make up the 518,690 square kilometres (200,270 sq mi) of land. This land is primarily residuum and colluvium matter on weakly developed soils and is put to use by humans through forestry, coal mining, some local agriculture, and tourism operations. The temperature averages around 17–18 °C annually and precipitation can be anywhere from 1,000–2,000 millimetres (39–79 in), which provides a suitable environment for mixed oaks and hickory, white pine, birch, beech, maple, and hemlock trees. In this environment, black bears, white tailed deer, chipmunks, and wild turkeys are commonly found

The final of the five Level II ecoregions in the Eastern Temperate Forest is Mississippi Alluvial and Southeastern Coastal Plains. The 368,720 square kilometres (142,360 sq mi) of land in this region is home to a very vast amount of organisms including animals such as white-tailed deer, opossums, armadillos, American alligators, mockingbirds, and egrets, along with varying vegetation from bottomland forests (ash, oak, tupelo, bald cypress) and southern mixed forests (beech, sweet gum, magnolias, oaks, pine, saw palmetto). The climate of 13−27 °C and precipitation varying between 1,100–1,800 millimetres (43–71 in) annually provides adequate conditions for forestry, citrus, soybean, and cotton agriculture, fishing, and tourism.

=== Mixed Wood Plains ===
- Driftless Area (ecoregion)
- Eastern Great Lakes and Hudson Lowlands (ecoregion)
- Erie Drift Plain (ecoregion)
- Lake Erie Lowland (ecoregion)
- Maine/New Brunswick Plains and Hills (ecoregion)
- Maritime Lowlands (ecoregion)
- North Central Hardwood Forests (ecoregion)
- Northeastern Coastal Zone (ecoregion)
- Northern Appalachian Plateau and Uplands (ecoregion)
- S. Michigan/N. Indiana Drift Plains (ecoregion)

=== Central USA Plains ===
- Central Corn Belt Plains (ecoregion)
- Eastern Corn Belt Plains (ecoregion)
- Huron/Erie Lake Plains (ecoregion)
- Southeastern Wisconsin Till Plains (ecoregion)

=== Southeastern USA Plains ===
- East Central Texas Plains (ecoregion)
- Interior Plateau (ecoregion)
- Interior River Valleys and Hills (ecoregion)
- Mississippi Valley Loess Plains (ecoregion)
- Northern Piedmont (ecoregion)
- Piedmont (ecoregion)
- South Central Plains (ecoregion)
- Southeastern Plains (ecoregion)

=== Ozark, Ouachita-Appalachian Forests ===
- Arkansas Valley (ecoregion)
- Blue Ridge (ecoregion)
- Boston Mountains (ecoregion)
- Central Appalachians (ecoregion)
- Ouachita Mountains (ecoregion)
- Ozark Highlands (ecoregion)
- Ridge and Valley (ecoregion)
- Southwestern Appalachians (ecoregion)
- Western Allegheny Plateau (ecoregion)

=== Mississippi Alluvial and Southeast USA Coastal Plains ===
- Atlantic Coastal Pine Barrens (ecoregion)
- Middle Atlantic Coastal Plain (ecoregion)
- Mississippi Alluvial Plain (ecoregion)
- Southern Coastal Plain (ecoregion)
