= Southeastern Plains (ecoregion) =

Level III ecoregion in the United States

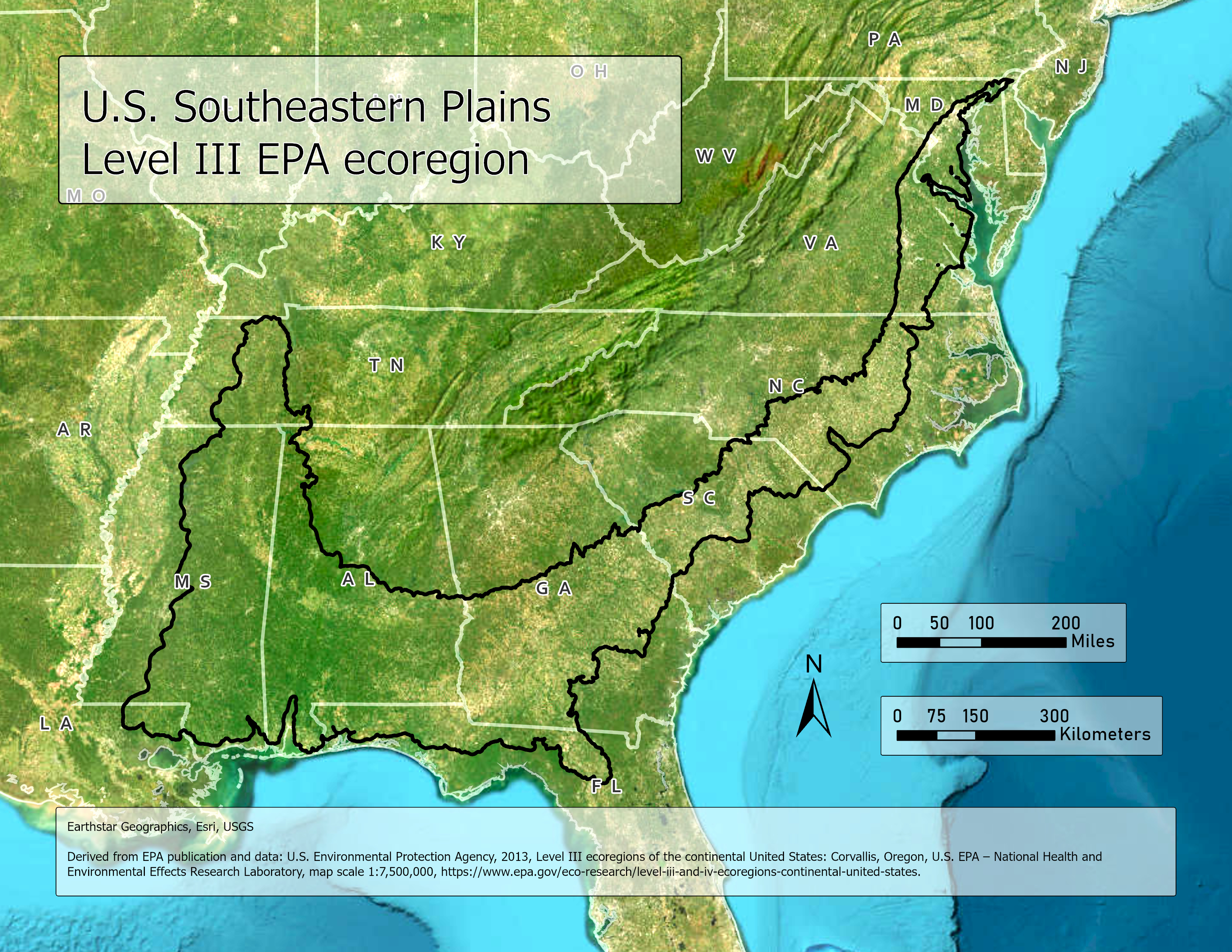
- Satellite imagery of the Southeastern Plains, with state boundaries
- Southeastern Plains

Ecology
- Realm: Nearctic realm
- Biome: Temperate grassland
- Borders: List: Ridge and Valley (67); Southwestern Appalachians (68); Interior Plateau (71); Mississippi Valley Loess Plains (74); Southern Coastal Plain (75); Middle Atlantic Coastal Plain (63); Northern Piedmont (64); Piedmont (45)

Geography
- Area: 329,041 km^{2} (127,043 mi^{2})
- Country: United States
- States: List: Tennessee; Mississippi; Louisiana; Alabama; Florida; Georgia; South Carolina; North Carolina; Virginia; Maryland
- Coordinates: 32°N 84°W
- Geology: Cretaceous sands, silts, and clays
- Climate type: Humid subtropical (Cfa)

The North American Southeastern Plains are a Level III ecoregion designated by the Environmental Protection Agency (EPA) in ten U.S. states. The region takes a U shape starting in western Tennessee, going south through eastern Mississippi, and forming most of Alabama. On the eastern side, the plains lie between the Appalachian Mountains and the coastal plains, forming central Georgia, South Carolina, and North Carolina. It forms part of eastern Virginia before terminating in Maryland.

The Southeastern Plains ecoregion has been subdivided into eighteen Level IV ecoregions.

== Description ==
The EPA-designated region encompasses 329,041 square kilometres (127,043 mi^{2}). The bordering Level III ecoregions are Ridge and Valley (67), Southwestern Appalachians (68), Interior Plateau (71), Mississippi Valley Loess Plains (74), Southern Coastal Plain (75), Middle Atlantic Coastal Plain (63), Northern Piedmont (64), and Piedmont (45).

=== Terrain ===
The terrain of the Southeastern Plains is dissected, rolling to smooth plains. The Cretaceous sands, silts, and clays of this region contrast geologically with the older metamorphic and igneous rocks of the Piedmont ecoregion, and with the Paleozoic limestone, chert, and shale of the Interior Low Plateaus ecoregion. Elevations and relief are greater than in the Southern Coastal Plain and Mississippi Alluvial Plain.

=== Climate ===
The Southeastern Plains ecoregion has a mild, mid-latitude humid subtropical climate. In the Köppen climate classification scheme, the area is classified within Cfa: humid subtropical climates. It has hot, humid summers and mild winters. Mean annual temperatures range from 13 °C (55 °F) in the north to 19 °C (66 °F) in the south. The frost-free period ranges from 200 days in the north to 300 days in the south. The mean annual precipitation is 1,358 millimetres (53.5 in), and ranges from 1,140 millimetres (45 in) to 1,520 millimetres (60 in). Precipitation is fairly evenly distributed throughout the year.

Albany, Georgia (ecoregion 65g)

Climate chart (precipitation, max. and min. temperature)
J	F	M	A	M	J	J	A	S	O	N	D
4.2 39 62	4 42 66	4.4 48 73	3.7 54 80	2.4 63 88	5.1 71 91	5.1 73 93	4.8 73 92	3.4 68 88	2.3 57 81	2.9 46 71	4.4 41 64
- █ Average max. and min. temperatures in °F
- █ Precipitation totals in inches
- Source: National Weather Service
Metric conversion
J	F	M	A	M	J	J	A	S	O	N	D
106 4 17	102 6 19	111 9 23	93 12 26	61 17 31	129 21 33	130 23 34	123 23 34	86 20 31	58 14 27	75 8 22	110 5 18
- █ Average max. and min. temperatures in °C
- █ Precipitation totals in mm

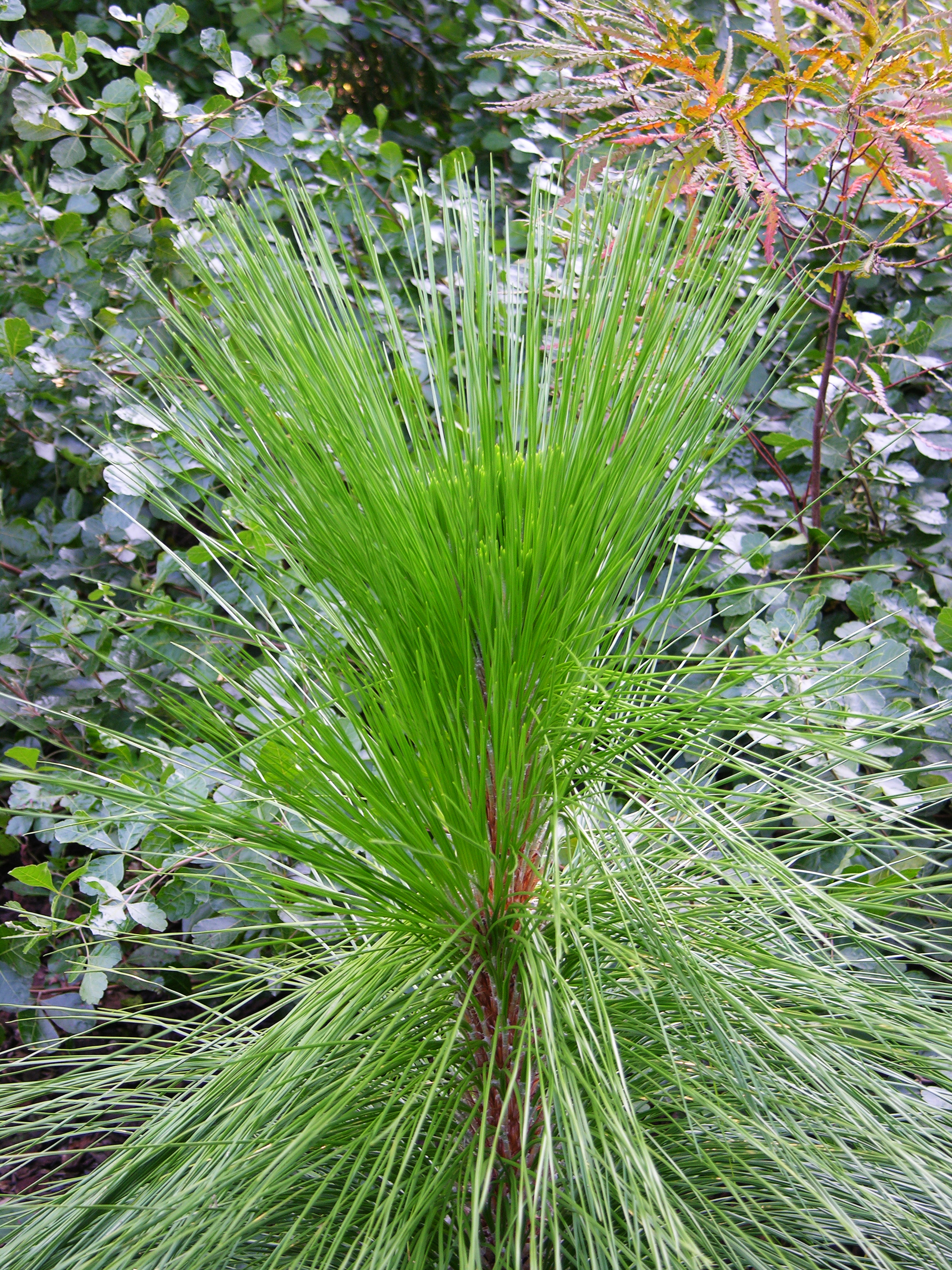
Longleaf pine (Pinus palustris) sapling

=== Hydrology ===
The ecoregion has a moderate to dense network of perennial streams and rivers, generally moderate to low gradient, often with sandy substrates. There are few natural lakes but several large reservoirs.

Major waterways include:

- Tennessee River
- Hatchie River
- Pearl River
- Much of the Mobile River watershed
- Conecuh River
- Chattahoochee River
- Flint River
- Ogeechee River
- Savannah River
- Congaree River
- Pee Dee River
- Lumber River
- Neuse River
- Roanoke River
- James River
- Rappahannock River

Many of these rivers transition into adjacent Level III ecoregions as they approach the coast.

Major lakes and reservoirs include:

- Pickwick Lake
- Bay Springs Lake
- Sardis Lake
- Enid Lake
- Grenada Lake
- Lake Seminole
- Walter F. George Reservoir
- Lake Marion

WWF freshwater ecoregions which overlap the Southeastern Plains are Temperate upland rivers – Tennessee (152); Temperate floodplain rivers and wetlands – Lower Mississippi (149), Mobile Bay (153), and Apalachicola (155); Temperate coastal rivers – West Florida Gulf (154), Appalachian Piedmont (157), and Chesapeake Bay (158); Tropical and subtropical coastal rivers – Florida Peninsula (156).

=== Vegetation ===
Natural vegetation was predominantly longleaf pine with smaller areas of oak–hickory–pine, and in the south some Southern mixed forest with beech, sweetgum, southern magnolia, laurel and live oaks, and various pines. Floodplains include bottomland oaks, red maple, green ash, sweetgum, and American elm, and areas of bald cypress, pond cypress, and water tupelo.

=== Wildlife ===
Mammals include white-tailed deer, black bear, bobcat, gray fox, raccoon, gray squirrel, swamp rabbit, eastern chipmunk, and pine vole. Birds include eastern wild turkey, northern cardinal, Carolina wren, wood thrush, tufted titmouse, hooded warbler, summer tanager, herons, and egrets. Herpetofauna includes American alligator, eastern box turtle, common garter snake, copperhead, and eastern diamondback rattlesnake.

Aerial view of Montgomery, Alabama, located in 65b

=== Land use and human activities ===
The ecoregion is a mosaic of cropland, pasture, woodland, and forest land cover. There are large areas of pine plantations and successional pine and hardwood woodlands. Agriculture includes corn, cotton, soybeans, peanuts, onions, sweet potatoes, melons, tobacco, poultry, and hogs. Cities include Richmond, Fayetteville, Columbia, Augusta, Columbus, Tallahassee, Montgomery, and Hattiesburg.

== Level IV ecoregions ==
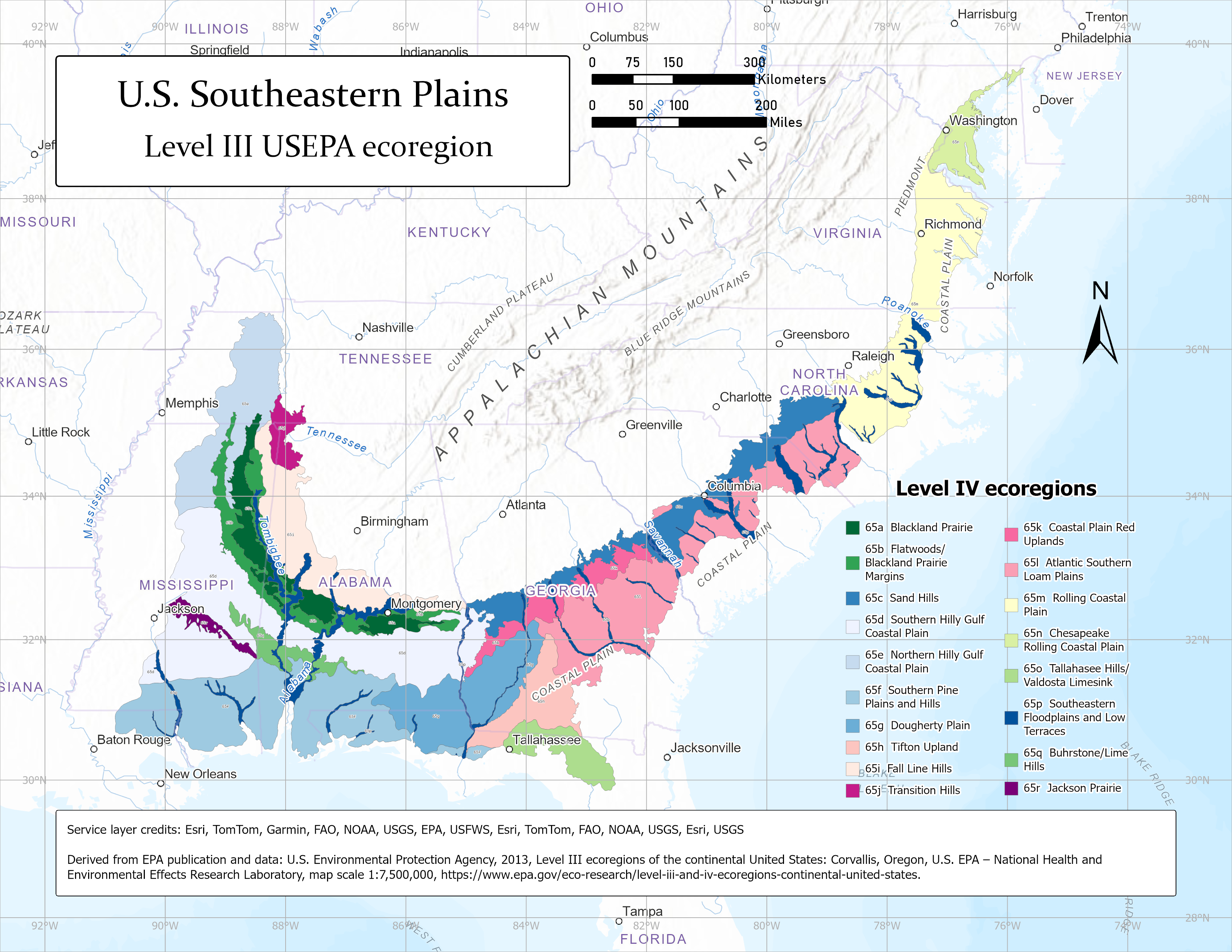
Map of the Southeastern Plains' Level IV ecoregions

=== Blackland Prairie (65a) ===
The flat to undulating Blackland Prairie region has distinctive Cretaceous-age chalk, marl, and calcareous clay. The clayey soils tend to shrink and crack when dry and swell when wet. Streams have a high variability in flow and affect some fish species distributions. The natural vegetation had dominant trees of sweetgum, post oak, and red cedar, along with patches of bluestem prairie. Today, the area is mostly cropland and pasture, with small patches of mixed hardwoods. Pond-raised catfish aquaculture has increased in recent years.

=== Flatwoods/Blackland Prairie Margins (65b) ===
The Flatwoods/Blackland Prairie Margins combines two slightly different areas. The Flatwoods consist of a mostly forested lowland area of little relief, formed primarily on dark, massive marine clay. Soils are deep, clayey, somewhat-poorly to poorly drained, and acidic. The Blackland Prairie Margins are undulating, irregular plains, with slightly more relief than the Flatwoods, but also tend to have heavy clay soils that are sticky when wet, hard and cracked when dry, with generally poor drainage.

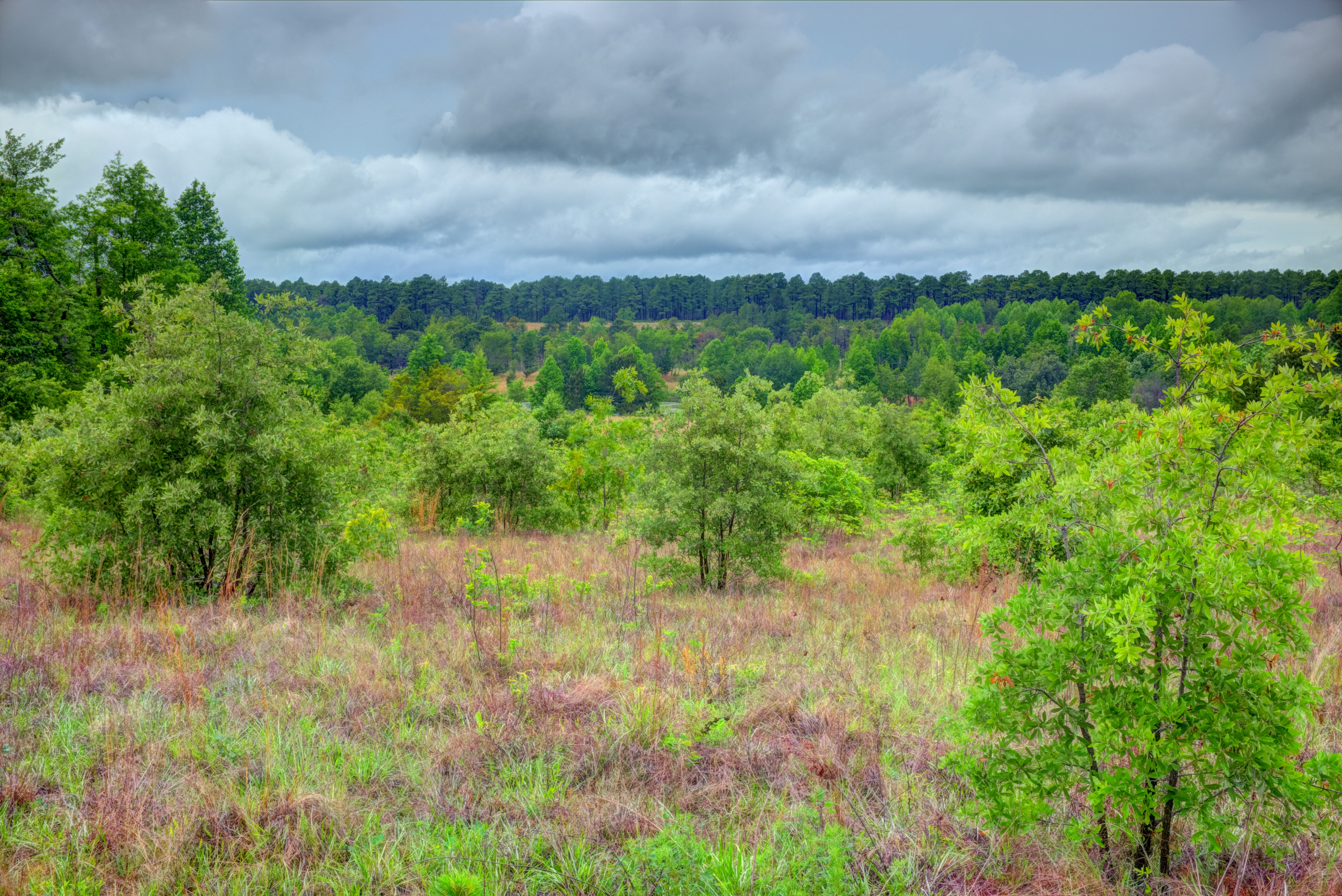
Carolina Sandhills National Wildlife Refuge, located in 65c

=== Sand Hills (65c) ===
The Sand Hills of Georgia form a narrow, rolling to hilly, highly dissected coastal plain belt stretching across the state from Augusta to Columbus. The region is composed primarily of Cretaceous and some Eocene-age marine sands and clays deposited over the crystalline and metamorphic rocks of the Piedmont (45). Many of the droughty, low-nutrient soils formed in thick beds of sand, although soils in some areas contain more loamy and clayey horizons. On the drier sites, turkey oak and longleaf pine are dominant, while shortleaf-loblolly pine forests and other oak-pine forests are common throughout the region.

=== Southern Hilly Gulf Coastal Plain (65d) ===
The dissected irregular plains and gently rolling low hills of the Southern Hilly Gulf Coastal Plain ecoregion developed over diverse east–west trending bands of sand, clay, and marl formations. Broad cuestas with gentle south slopes and steeper north-facing slopes are common, and the heterogeneous region has a mix of clayey, loamy, and sandy soils. It has more rolling topography, higher elevations, and more relief than 65a, 65b, 65f, 65g, and streams have increased gradient. The natural vegetation of oak–hickory–pine forest grades into southern mixed forest to the south. Land cover is mostly forest and woodland, with some cropland and pasture.

=== Northern Hilly Gulf Coastal Plain (65e) ===
The Northern Hilly Gulf Coastal Plain ecoregion contains several north–south trending bands of sand and clay formations, and extends north to the Kentucky–Tennessee border. Eocene and Paleocene-age sand, clay, and lignite underlie the western part of the region, and Cretaceous-age fine sands and clays lie to the east. In Mississippi, the region includes the prominent Pontotoc Ridge. The ridge is formed from outcroppings of marls and sands on the Ripley Formation cuesta. The marl and sand surficial materials have weathered into a reddish surface color, contrasting with the darker soils of adjacent 65a and 65b. The boundary to the south with the Southern Hilly Gulf Coastal Plain (65d) is broad and transitional. The climate is generally cooler to the north in 65e and there is a greater density of upland hardwood forests than in 65d.

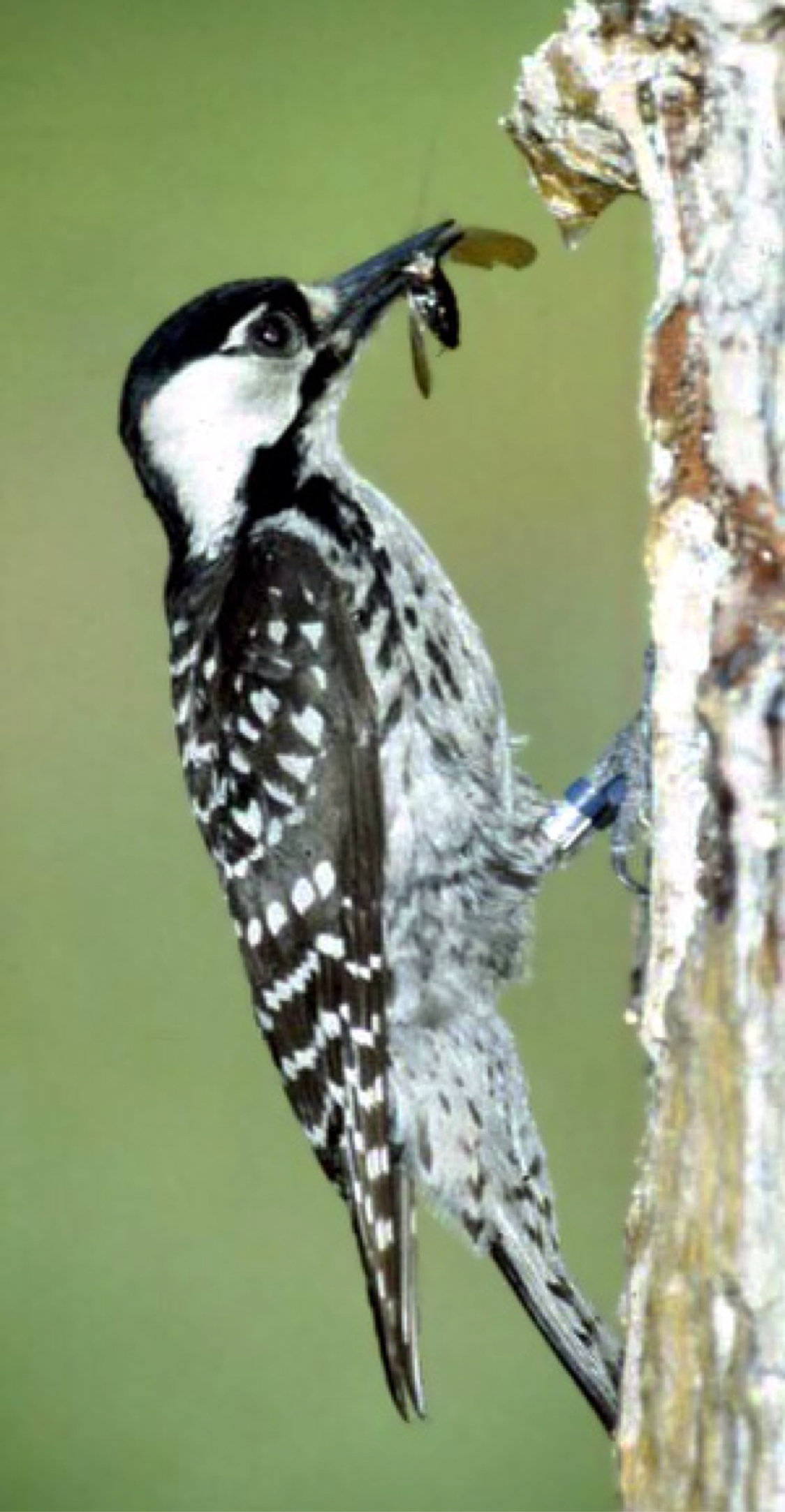
Red-cockaded Woodpecker (Picoides borealis)

=== Southern Pine Plains and Hills (65f) ===
The Southern Pine Plains and Hills have a different mix of vegetation and land use compared to 65d, and streams tend to be darker tea-colored and more acidic as one moves south. The oak–hickory–pine forest of the north in 65d grades into Southern mixed forest and longleaf pine forest in this region. The longleaf pine forest provided habitat for now rare or endangered species such as the red-cockaded woodpecker, gopher tortoise, eastern indigo snake, and Florida pine snake. Loblolly and slash pine plantations now cover wide areas.

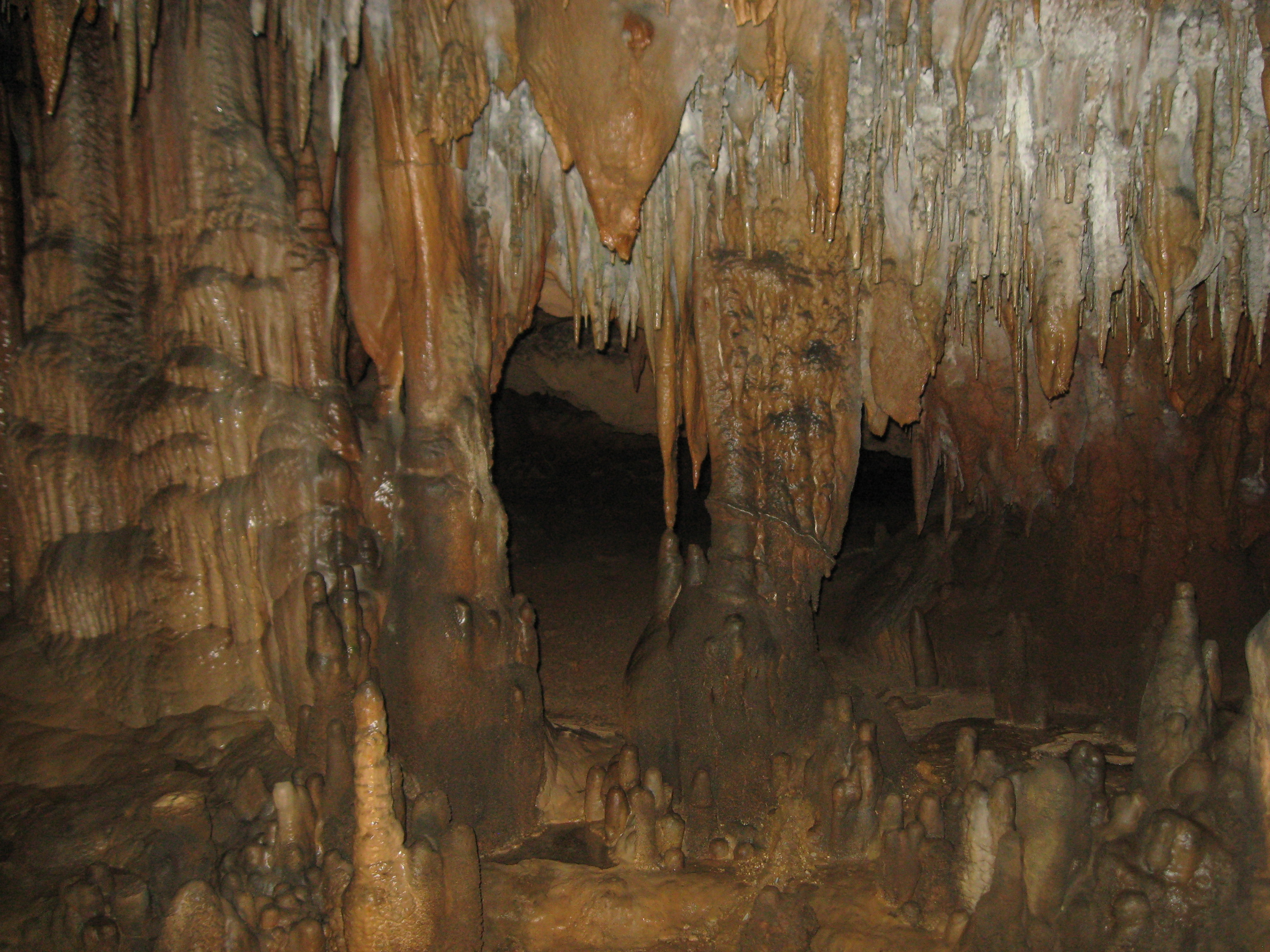
Limestone caverns at Florida Caverns State Park exemplify the karst topography of the Dougherty Plain (65g)

=== Dougherty Plain (65g) ===
The Dougherty Plain is mostly flat to gently rolling and influenced by the near-surface limestone. The karst topography contains sinkholes, springs, and fewer streams in the flatter part of the plain. The northwestern boundary is gradational, as more gentle slopes and lower relief are found towards the center of the region. Crops such as peanuts and pecans are common, and cotton production has increased dramatically in recent years. Many of the limesink ponds and marshes act as biological oases in the mostly agricultural landscape.

=== Tifton Upland (65h) ===
The Tifton Upland of Georgia has more rolling, hilly topography compared to 65g and 75e, with a mosaic of agriculture, pasture, and some mixed pine/hardwood forests. Soils are well-drained, brownish, and loamy, often with iron-rich or plinthic layers. They support crops of cotton, peanuts, soybeans, and corn. On the west side of the region, the Pelham Escarpment has bluffs and deep ravines with cool microclimates that support several rare plants and animals, as well as species with more northern affinities.

=== Fall Line Hills (65i) ===
The Fall line Hills are composed primarily of Cretaceous-age loamy and sandy sediments. It is mostly forested terrain of oak–hickory–pine on hills with 200 feet (61 m)–400 feet (120 m) of relief. Longleaf pine is being reintroduced in many parts of the region, and the area around the Talladega National Forest in west Alabama provides a major stronghold for the endangered red-cockaded woodpecker.

=== Transition Hills (65j) ===
The Transition Hills have some of the higher elevations in Ecoregion 65, and contain characteristics of both the Southeastern Plains and the Interior Plateau (71) ecoregions. Many streams in this transition area have cut down into the Mississippian, Devonian, and Silurian-age rocks and can look similar to those of the Interior Plateau. Cretaceous-age coastal plain deposits of silt, sand, clay, and gravel, however, overlie the older limestone, shale, and chert. It is a mostly forested region of oak–hickory–pine, with small areas of cropland and pasture in narrow valley bottoms and on gently sloping ridges.

=== Coastal Plain Red Uplands (65k) ===
In contrast to the more forested Sand Hills (65c) that formed mostly on light-colored Cretaceous sands, the Coastal Plain Red Uplands formed on reddish Eocene sand and clay formations. Soils are mostly well drained with a brown or reddish brown loamy or sandy surface layer and red subsoils. The majority of the area is in cropland or pasture, with some woodland on steeper slopes.

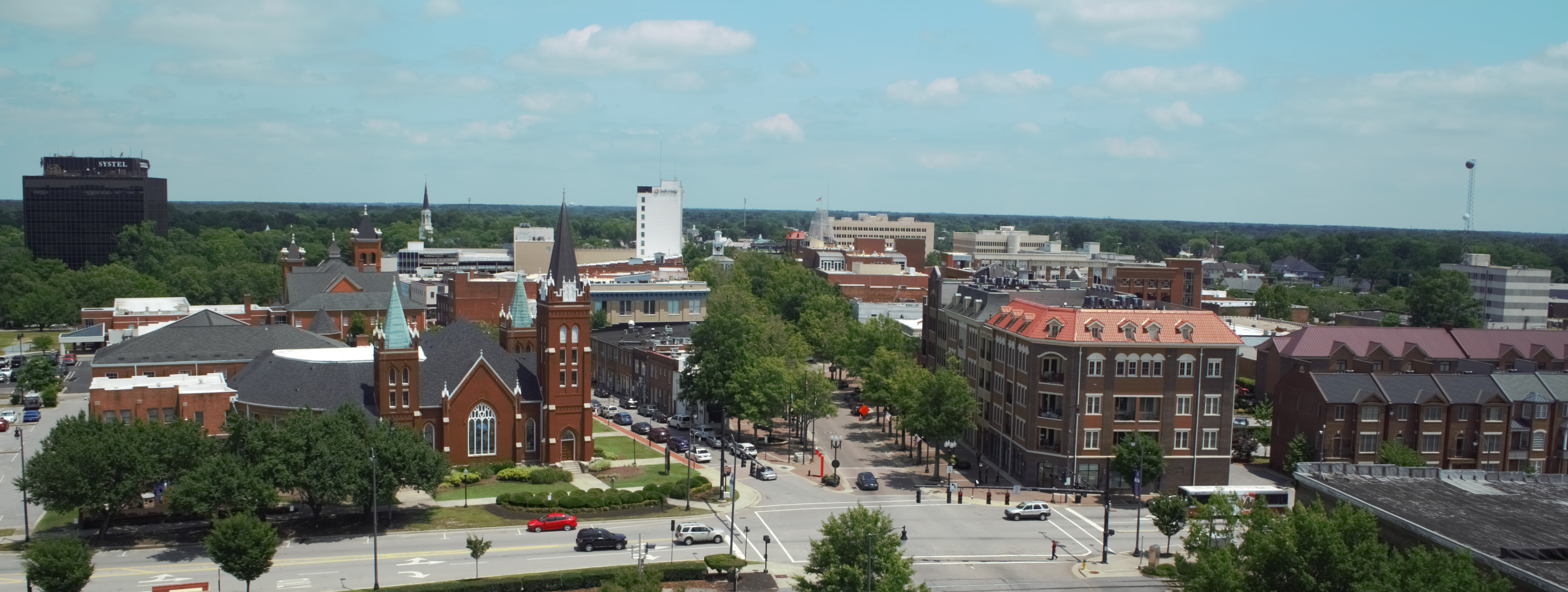
Fayetteville, North Carolina, located in 65l

=== Atlantic Southern Loam Plains (65l) ===
Also called the Vidalia Upland in Georgia, the Atlantic Southern Loam Plains ecoregion is generally lower, flatter, and more gently rolling than 65k, and has more cropland and finer-textured soils than 75f. Similar to 65h, it has an abundance of the agriculturally important Tifton soils, but the region also contains forested areas that are more sloping or are low, flat and poorly drained. Parallel to some of the major stream courses are some excessively-drained, dunal sand ridges with xeric vegetation such as longleaf pine / turkey oak forests, and some distinctive evergreen shrubs, such as rosemary and woody mints.

=== Rolling Coastal Plain (65m) ===
The dissected Rolling Coastal Plain extends south from Virginia and covers much of the northern upper coastal plain of North Carolina. Relief, elevation, and stream gradients are generally greater than in Ecoregion 63 to the east, and soils tend to be better drained. It has a slightly cooler and shorter growing season than 65l, but is a productive agricultural region with typical crops of corn, soybeans, tobacco, cotton, sweet potatoes, peanuts, and wheat. The region appears to be biologically less diverse than the coastal plain regions 65l and 63h to the south.

=== Chesapeake Rolling Coastal Plain (65n) ===
The Chesapeake Rolling Coastal Plain is a hilly upland with narrow stream divides, incised streams, and well-drained loamy soils. It is hillier, more dissected, and better drained than the Middle Atlantic Coastal Plain (63) and its underlying sedimentary rocks are distinct from the older, metamorphic rocks of the Piedmont. Stream margins can be swampy and stained water commonly occurs. Soils are naturally low in nutrients and support a potential natural vegetation of mostly oak–hickory–pine forest. Today, urbanization and residential development are extensive within commuting distance to Baltimore, Washington, Wilmington, or Annapolis. Elsewhere, less intensive agriculture, general farming, or part time agriculture occurs; the landuse mosaic is distinct from the more forested Rolling, Inner Coastal Plain (65m).

=== Tallahassee Hills/Valdosta Limesink (65o) ===
The Tallahassee Hills/Valdosta Limesink ecoregion combines two slightly different areas, both influenced by underlying limestone. The Floridan aquifer is thinly confined in this region, and streams are often intermittent or in parts flow underground in the karst landscape. In the west, the Tallahassee Hills portion has rolling, hilly topography that is more forested than 65h. Clayey sands weathered to a thick red residual soil are typical. Relief decreases towards the east, and the Valdosta Limesink area has more solution basins with ponds and lakes, and more cropland. The soils are typically brownish.

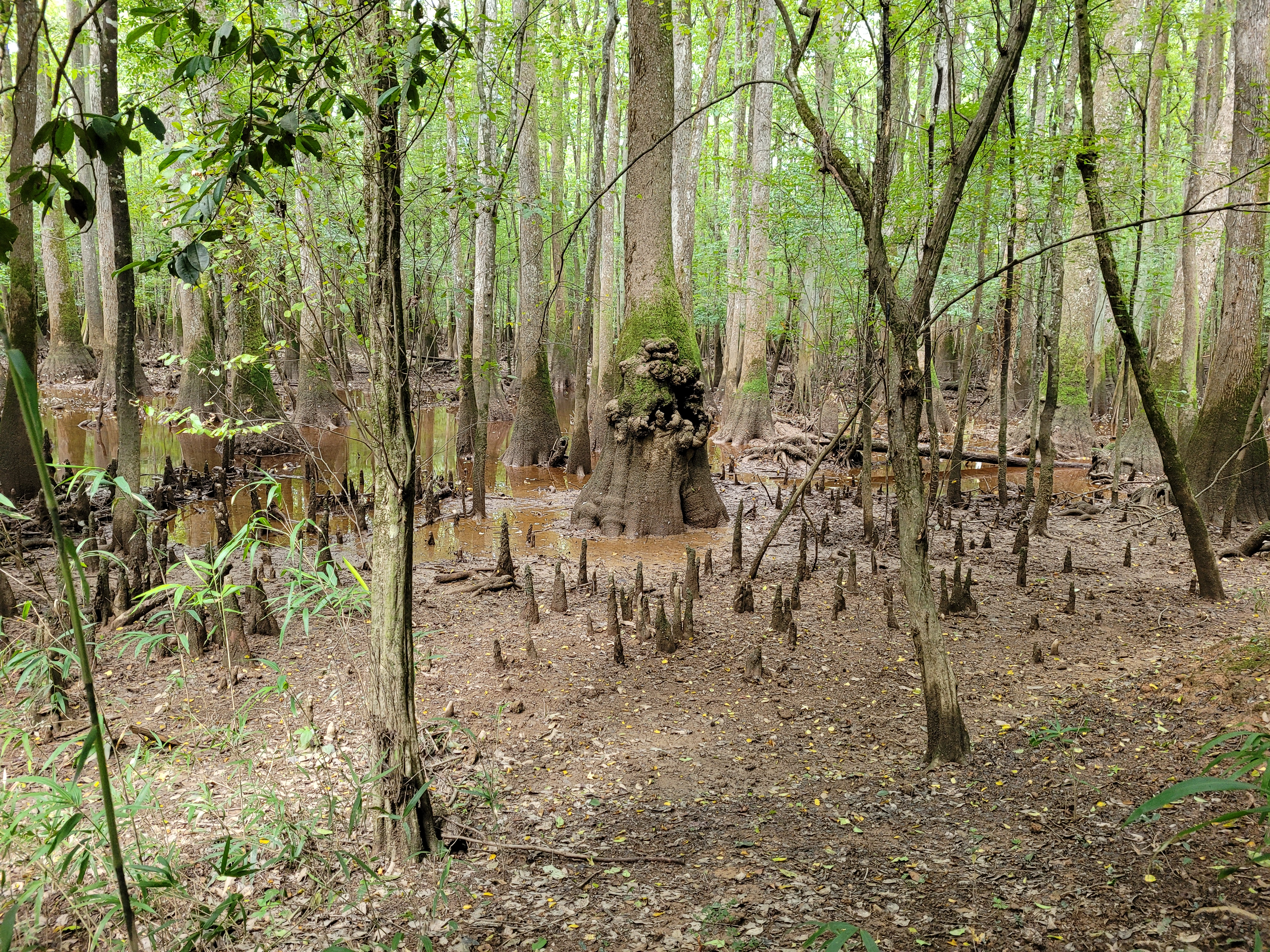
Congaree National Park, located in Southeastern Floodplains and Low Terraces (65p)

=== Southeastern Floodplains and Low Terraces (65p) ===
Southeastern Floodplains and Low Terraces are a riverine ecoregion of large sluggish rivers and backwaters with ponds, swamps, and oxbow lakes. River swamp forests of bald cypress and water tupelo and oak-dominated bottomland hardwood forests provide important wildlife corridors and habitat. In Alabama, cropland is typical on the higher, better-drained terraces, while hardwood forests cover the floodplains. In Georgia, the terraces are not as broad and are primarily in bottomland hardwood forest.

=== Buhrstone/Lime Hills (65q) ===
The Buhrstone/Lime Hills region has some of the most rugged terrain of the Alabama coastal plain. The rough, hilly topography is attributed to the hardened beds of claystone, sandstone, and resistant limestones. Many of the streams have relatively high gradients and hard-rock bottoms. Some fish species that are generally found above the Fall Line are also found in this region because of its streams with upland characteristics. The Red Hills salamander, a threatened species, is also found mostly within 65q on cool, shady, moist ravines and bluffs.

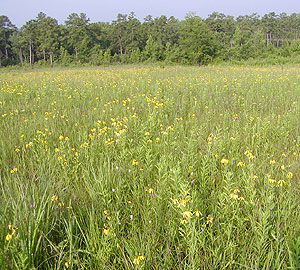
Harrell Prairie Hill, in the Jackson Prairie

=== Jackson Prairie (65r) ===
The Jackson Prairie ecoregion is a narrow belt of irregular plains and low, broad hills underlain primarily by the Yazoo Clay of the Eocene-age Jackson Group. The calcareous clay, sand, and marl is commonly overlain by alkaline, clayey soils that expand when wet and shrink when dry. Fossilized bones of ancient whale-like mammals (Basilosaurus cetoides and Zygorhiza kochii) are found in this formation, along with fossil oyster shells and other calcareous sediments that contributed to the formation of the alkaline soils. The historic vegetation was mostly mixed hardwood and pine forests with a scattering of prairies. The soils and gentle topography of the region attracted early settlement and agricultural development, but logging, cultivation, and land abandonment also caused extensive soil erosion. Fire suppression also allowed encroachment of woody vegetation into the prairies. Today, much of the region is forested or in pine plantations, with some rowcrop agriculture, and grazing and haying for livestock production. Some isolated calcareous prairie remnants occur, surrounded by more acidic mixed pine and hardwood forests. Efforts are being made to maintain the prairie species with controlled burning and other management programs on national forest lands.
