= Southern Coastal Plain =

Southern Coastal Plain may refer to:

- Southern Coastal Plain (ecoregion), an ecoregion in the southeastern United States
- Southern Coastal Plain (Israel), a region in Israel
