= Middle Atlantic coastal forests =

Temperate coniferous forests ecoregion of the United States

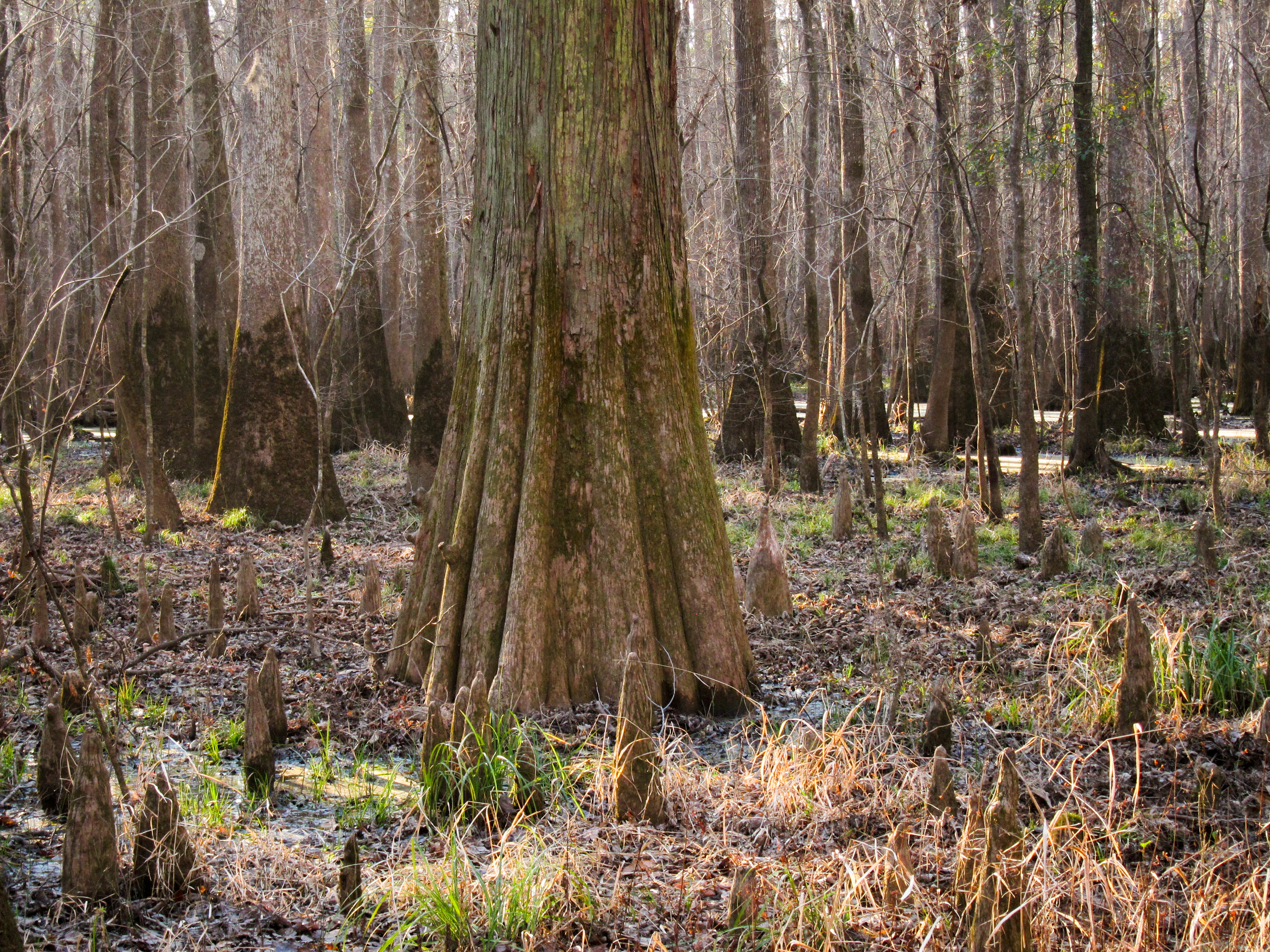
- Congaree National Park in South Carolina

Ecology
- Realm: Nearctic
- Biome: Temperate coniferous forest
- Borders: Southeastern conifer forests; Southeastern mixed forests; Northeastern coastal forests
- Bird species: 237
- Mammal species: 58

Geography
- Area: 133,600 km^{2} (51,600 mi^{2})
- Country: United States
- States: New Jersey; Delaware; Maryland; Virginia; North Carolina; South Carolina; Georgia
- Climate type: Humid subtropical (Cfa)

Conservation
- Habitat loss: 39.3%
- Protected: 11.3%

The Middle Atlantic coastal forests are a temperate coniferous forest mixed with patches of evergreen broadleaved forests (closer to the Atlantic coast) along the coast of the southeastern United States.

== Setting ==
The Middle Atlantic coastal forests stretch along the Southern Atlantic coast of the United States from extreme South Jersey south to the Georgia coast. They cover the lower Atlantic coastal plain and are bordered on the west by the Southeastern mixed forests.

The habitats of the ecoregion are constantly modified by natural processes. The bottomlands, coastal plains, and maritime areas are vulnerable to tropical cyclones and floods. The drier areas with porous sandy soils are susceptible to fires and drought. Fire return intervals of 1 to 3 years favor herbaceous plants; longer intervals favor dense shrubs, to broadleaved evergreen trees.

== Climate ==
This ecoregion has a humid subtropical climate with hot summers and mild winters, and with the heaviest precipitation concentrated in the warmest months.

== Flora ==
Two basic types of forests are found in this region; 1) Southern mixed hickory-pine-oak forests that see frequent fire with sandy soils, and 2) isolated patches of evergreen broadleaved forests and "hammocks" close to the Atlantic coastline in the southernmost areas in coastal South Carolina and coastal Georgia.

The mixed pine-oak forests occur on dry or sandy soils or in areas exposed to occasional fires. Longleaf pine (Pinus palustris), superbly adapted to fire-prone environments, was the principal tree in many of these forests; however, extensive logging and human development have reduced this trees occurrence to less than 5% of its former range. Loblolly pine (Pinus taeda) and shortleaf pine (Pinus echinata) grow in sandy soils and are still dominant in this ecosystem. Loblolly is widely planted on millions of acres of plantation forests across the southeastern US. On moist soils or where fires are infrequent, hardwoods overtake the pines. These hardwoods include turkey oak (Quercus laevis), post oak (Quercus stellata), myrtle oak (Quercus myrtifolia), Spanish oak (Quercus falcata), and southern catalpa (Catalpa bignonioides).

Evergreen broadleaved forests occur close to the coast in localized areas as either evergreen Maritime oak forests or as more localized evergreen hammocks (geographically induced forest islands) (Box 1985). These forests consist of evergreen broadleaved and needled canopy trees, such as Magnolia grandiflora, Magnolia virginiana, Tamala borbonia, Gordonia lasianthus, Sabal, Juniperus virginiana, Pinus taeda, and several evergreen oaks such as Quercus myrtifolia and the iconic Quercus virginiana or southern live oak often covered with Spanish moss (Tillandsia usneoides). The understory is also often evergreen in these forests, with Myrica cerifera and Osmanthus americanus very common, while several evergreen species of Ericaceae, Ilex, and scrub palms (Sabal minor and Serenoa) are common on more moist sites. In the open areas near sandy beaches and coastal areas, large endemic populations of Yucca and cactus (Opuntia) thrive in the hot sun and sandy soils.

The Middle Atlantic coastal forests contain the most diverse assemblage of freshwater wetland communities in North America. These include freshwater marshes, shrub bogs, white cedar swamps, bayheads, and wet hammocks.

The bottomland hardwood forests for which the ecoregion is famous are dominated by bald cypress (Taxodium distichum) and swamp tupelo (Nyssa sylvatica var. biflora).

Bald cypress swamps are often dominated by their namesake tree, and are too wet for foot travel. Many uncommon orchids grow among the bald cypress branches.

Swamp tupelo, along with water tupelo (Nyssa aquatica), dominate mixed-hardwood swamp forests. These grow aside water-adapted oaks that include water oak (Quercus nigra), swamp chestnut oak (Quercus michauxii), cherrybark oak (Quercus pagoda), willow oak (Quercus phellos), and overcup oak (Quercus lyrata). Swamp hickory (Carya glabra) and water hickory (Carya aquatica) are also found here. Pawpaw (Asimina triloba) grows in the understory.

Atlantic white cedar (Chamaecyparis thyoides) swamps occur along blackwater rivers.

The American sycamore (Platanus occidentalis) is found throughout the ecoregion.

Pocosins are flat and damp, sandy, or peaty areas far from streams. They have scattered pond pine (Pinus serotina) and a dense growth of mostly evergreen shrubs including gallberry (Ilex glabra).

Barrier islands along the coast protect extensive estuaries, lagoons, and sounds.

Carolina bays are a unique habitat of the ecoregion.

== Fauna ==
The nine-banded armadillo (Dasypus novemcinctus) is a distinctive animal that lives in this ecoregion. The Virginia opossum (Didelphis virginiana) is abundant.

In the mixed pine-oak forests, the brown-headed nuthatch (Sitta pusilla) feeds on pine seeds. The yellow-throated warbler (Dendroica dominica) is widely distributed. The northern parula (Parula americana) and the eastern bluebird (Sialia sialis) are also found here. The Bachman's sparrow (Aimophila aestivalis) and red-cockaded woodpecker (Picoides borealis), both uncommon, also live in this ecoregion.

The bottomland forests support abundant arthropods, produce mast that sustains migratory birds during the winter, and produce boles, branch cavities, and rotting logs that support various detritivores and hole-nesting species. In the extreme southeast regions (coastal southeast North Carolina south to Georgia) the large American alligator (Alligator mississippiensis) can be found along tidal inlets and marsh areas.

== Contemporary land use ==
The main causes of habitat conversion are agriculture, fire suppression, urbanization, coastal development, ditching and draining of wetlands, and damming of rivers.

The western part of the ecoregion has been most altered. There, the upland vegetation has been nearly completely converted.

Long-leaf pine savannas have nearly disappeared.

The least altered habitats in the ecoregion are the coastal marshes and deep peatlands.

== Remaining intact habitat ==
- Francis Marion National Forest (SC)
- Pine Barrens (NJ)
- Holly Shelter Gamelands (NC)
- Croatan National Forest (NC)
- Congaree National Park (SC)
- Outer Banks (NC)
- Pamlimarle Peninsula (NC)
- Prime Hook National Wildlife Refuge (DE)
- Roanoke River (VA)
- Sandhills Gameland (NC)
- Sandhill National Wildlife Refuge (SC)
- Great Dismal Swamp (VA and NC)
- Great Cypress Swamp (DE and MD)
- Assateague Island (MD and VA)
- Virginia Coast Reserve (VA)
- Cape Romain (SC)
- Fort Bragg (NC)
- Fort Jackson (SC)
- Fort Stewart (GA)
- Cape May National Wildlife Refuge (NJ)

== See also ==
- List of ecoregions in the United States (WWF)
