= Carolina Sandhills National Wildlife Refuge =

United States National Wildlife Refuge in South Carolina

- IUCN category IV (habitat/species management area)
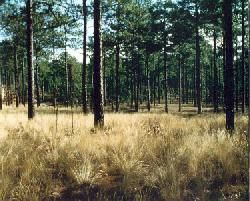
- Carolina Sandhills National Wildlife Refuge, May 2012

- Location within the United States Location within South Carolina
- Location: Chesterfield County, South Carolina, United States
- Nearest city: McBee, South Carolina
- Coordinates: 34.58348°N 80.23312°W
- Area: 45,348 acres (183.52 km^{2})
- Established: 1939
- Governing body: U.S. Fish and Wildlife Service
- Website: www.fws.gov/refuge/Carolina_Sandhills/

The Carolina Sandhills National Wildlife Refuge is a 45,348-acre (183.52 km^{2}) national wildlife refuge (NWR) located in Chesterfield County, South Carolina. The refuge is managed by the U.S. Fish and Wildlife Service from a headquarters located in McBee, South Carolina. The refuge is served by U.S. Highway 1, which passes through it.

== Geology ==
With respect to geologic setting, the Carolina Sandhills NWR consists of Quaternary sands of eolian (wind-blown) origin that were active episodically from ~75,000 to 6,000 years ago, but the sands are stabilized by vegetation under modern climate conditions. These Quaternary sands, which are mapped as the Pinehurst Formation, overlie Cretaceous units of sand, sandstone, conglomerate, and mud of fluvial (river) origin that are mapped collectively as the Middendorf Formation.

== Ecology ==
The Carolina Sandhills NWR is dedicated to the preservation of a portion of the Carolina Sandhills, a distinct ecosystem characterized by inland sand dunes, thin or absent topsoil, and frequent brush fires.

Recurrent, noncatastrophic fires tend to remove invasive shrubs and maximize the health of fire-tolerant species such as the longleaf pine. Pine-friendly birds and migratory birds, such as the endangered red-cockaded woodpecker, wild turkey, and bald eagle also thrive in the Sandhills. Mammals have also showing recoveries; recent species include red fox, eastern fox squirrel, beaver, white-tailed deer, otter, bobcat, opossum, raccoon, cottontail rabbit.

Current refuge management practices at the Carolina Sandhills NWR include a program of prescribed burnings.

== Human history ==
After attempts to farm this portion of the Sandhills were unsuccessful during the Great Depression, the region was consolidated by New Deal federal managers into the current National Wildlife Refuge in 1939.
