= Houpt, Minnesota =

Unincorporated community in Minnesota, United States

Houpt
- Unincorporated community
- Location within Minnesota Location within the United States
- Coordinates: 47°48′02″N 94°23′29″W
- Country: United States
- State: Minnesota
- County: Itasca
- Township: Nore Township
- Elevation: 1,394 ft (425 m)

Population
  - Total: 30
- Time zone: UTC-6 (Central (CST))
  - Summer (DST): UTC-5 (CDT)
- ZIP code: 56630 and 56661
- Area code: 218
- GNIS feature ID: 656664

Houpt is an unincorporated community in Nore Township, Itasca County, Minnesota, United States, located in the northwest corner of the county.

The community is located between Northome and Blackduck at the intersection of U.S. Highway 71 and Bowman Road. The South Cormorant River flows through the community. Nearby places include Funkley, Northome, Blackduck, Orth, Bergville, and Alvwood.

Houpt is located seven miles southwest of Northome and nine miles northeast of Blackduck. Houpt is 15 miles northwest of Alvwood and 52 miles northwest of Deer River. The boundary line between Itasca, Beltrami, and Koochiching counties is nearby.

ZIP codes 56630 (Blackduck) and 56661 (Northome) meet near Houpt. A post office previously operated in the community of Houpt from 1903 to 1914.
