= Orth, Minnesota =

Unincorporated community in Minnesota, United States

Orth
- Unincorporated community
- Location within Minnesota Location within the United States
- Coordinates: 47°50′21″N 94°18′55″W
- Country: United States
- State: Minnesota
- County: Itasca
- Township: Nore Township
- Elevation: 1,450 ft (440 m)

Population
  - Total: 20
- Time zone: UTC-6 (Central (CST))
  - Summer (DST): UTC-5 (CDT)
- ZIP code: 56661
- Area code: 218
- GNIS feature ID: 657684

Orth is an unincorporated community in Nore Township, Itasca County, Minnesota, United States, located in the northwestern corner of the county.

The community is located southwest of Northome; along Itasca County Road 30. The North Cormorant River is in the vicinity. U.S. Highway 71 and State Highway 46 (MN 46) are both nearby.

Nearby places include Bergville, Northome, Houpt, Funkley, Blackduck, and Alvwood.

Orth is located five miles southwest of Northome and 14 miles northeast of Blackduck. Orth is nine miles northwest of Alvwood and 47 miles northwest of Deer River. The boundary line between Itasca, Koochiching, and Beltrami counties is nearby.

Orth is located within ZIP code 56661, based in Northome. A post office previously operated in the community of Orth, first as Bridgie (1895–1908), and then as Orth (1908–1930), until its closing in 1930.
