= Park House =

Park House may refer to:

in Canada

- Park House Museum, Amherstburg, Ontario

in the United Kingdom

- Park House, Cardiff, Wales
- Park House, Chester, England
- Park House, London, England
- Park House, Mells, Somerset
- Park House, a house constructed in 1863 on the royal estate of Sandringham House, in Sandringham, Norfolk, England, which was the birthplace of Diana, Princess of Wales

in the United States

(by state)

- William Park House, Sprague, Connecticut, listed on the National Register of Historic Places (NRHP) in New London County
- David Park House, Bemidji, Minnesota, listed on the NRHP in Beltrami County
- Park House (New York), Manhattan
- Jonathan Park House, Worthington, Ohio, listed on the NRHP in Franklin County
- James Park House, Knoxville, Tennessee, NRHP-listed
- Park-McCullough House, North Bennington, Vermont, NRHP-listed

== See also ==
- Parkhouse (disambiguation)
- Park House Hotel, Iowa City
- Park House Outbuildings, Stackpole, Wales
- Park House School, Newbury, Berkshire
- Park House English School, Doha, Qatar
