= Black Duck =

Black duck may refer to three dabbling ducks:

- African black duck, Anas sparsa
- American black duck, Anas rubripes
- Pacific black duck, Anas superciliosa

Black Duck or Blackduck may also refer to:

== Places ==
=== Canada ===
- Black Duck, Newfoundland and Labrador, a settlement in Canada
- Black Duck Creek (Manitoba), a stream in the Northern Region of Manitoba
- Black Duck Creek (Ontario), a stream in Osborne Township in Northeastern Ontario

=== United States ===
- Blackduck, Minnesota, a small city in the United States
- Blackduck Lake, a lake in Minnesota
- Blackduck River, tributary of Red Lake in northwestern Minnesota
- Blackduck State Forest, a state forest in Minnesota

=== Other places ===
- Black Duck Creek, Queensland, a locality in the Lockyer Valley Region, Queensland, Australia

== Organizations ==
- Black Duck (group), an Italian pop music group
- Black Duck Software, a software auditing company
- Black Duck Joint Venture, a conservation partnership
- Black Ducks, a nickname sometimes used for the Swan Districts Football Club

== See also ==
- Black sea duck
- Black swan
