= National Register of Historic Places listings in Beltrami County, Minnesota =

Location of Beltrami County in Minnesota

This is a list of the National Register of Historic Places listings in Beltrami County, Minnesota. This is intended to be a complete list of the properties and districts on the National Register of Historic Places in Beltrami County, Minnesota, United States. The locations of National Register properties and districts for which the latitude and longitude coordinates are included below, may be seen in an online map.

There are 13 properties and districts listed on the National Register in the county, including 1 National Historic Landmark district.

This National Park Service list is complete through NPS recent listings posted September 11, 2026.

== Current listings ==
	Name on the Register	Image	Date listed	Location	City or town	Description
1	Beltrami County Courthouse	Beltrami County Courthouse	May 26, 1988 (#88000665)	619 Beltrami Ave. NW; 47°28′27″N 94°52′55″W	Bemidji	1902 courthouse significant as Beltrami County's long-serving seat of government, as well as its most prominent public architecture and expression of Beaux-Arts style.
2	Bemidji Carnegie Library	Bemidji Carnegie Library	November 25, 1980 (#80001936)	426 Bemidji Ave. 47°28′22″N 94°52′46″W	Bemidji	Well-preserved local example of a Carnegie library and of public Neoclassical architecture, built in 1909.
3	Buena Vista Archeological Historic District	Buena Vista Archeological Historic District	November 7, 1996 (#96001311)	Off County Road 15; 47°39′21″N 94°53′11″W	Turtle Lake Township	Largely undisturbed site of a logging-era boomtown, established in 1896 and moribund by 1909. District includes the site of a nearby sawmill and an intact 1898 schoolhouse.
4	Paul Bunyan and Babe the Blue Ox	Paul Bunyan and Babe the Blue Ox	March 10, 1988 (#88000204)	3rd St. and Bemidji Ave. 47°28′14″N 94°52′44″W	Bemidji	The Midwest's first colossal roadside statues, built in 1937 to promote automobile tourism in northern Minnesota.
5	District No. 132 School	District No. 132 School	October 27, 1988 (#88002083)	County Road 500; 47°43′51″N 95°07′43″W	Debs	c. 1915 school building noted for its unusual wooden Neoclassical façade. Also known as Debs Consolidated School.
6	Great Northern Depot	Great Northern Depot	May 26, 1988 (#88000673)	130 Minnesota Ave. SW; 47°28′03″N 94°52′57″W	Bemidji	1913 train station symbolizing the rail access that transformed Bemidji into a logging boomtown and regional trade center. Now the Beltrami County History Center.
7	Lake Bemidji State Park CCC/NYA/Rustic Style Historic Resources	Lake Bemidji State Park CCC/NYA/Rustic Style Historic Resources	October 25, 1989 (#89001674)	Off County Highway 20 northeast of Bemidji; 47°32′05″N 94°49′40″W	Bemidji	Minnesota's only state park facilities constructed by the National Youth Administration; also significant as examples of New Deal federal work relief and National Park Service rustic design, with two contributing properties built 1937–39.
8	Minnesota and International Railway Trestle at Blackduck	Minnesota and International Railway Trestle at Blackduck	February 5, 2014 (#13001144)	0.25 miles (0.40 km) north of junction CSAH 39; 47°43′34″N 94°32′52″W	Blackduck	701-foot-long (214 m) timber trestle bridge built 1901–02 to cross a difficult marsh, noted for its considerable length and intact substructure. Now carries the Blue Ox Trail.
9	Nymore Bridge	Nymore Bridge	November 6, 1989 (#89001849)	1st St. over the Mississippi River; 47°28′01″N 94°52′42″W	Bemidji	Exemplary 1917 reinforced-concrete arch bridge, particularly noted for its large size, urban setting, barrel vault design, early date, and use of an early patented reinforcement system.
10	David Park House	David Park House	May 16, 1988 (#88000566)	1501 Birchmont Dr. 47°29′00″N 94°52′33″W	Bemidji	One of Minnesota's few outstanding examples of residential Streamline Moderne architecture, built in 1936.
11	Rabideau CCC Camp	Rabideau CCC Camp	June 16, 1976 (#76001046)	Off County Highway 39 in Chippewa National Forest; 47°38′28″N 94°32′58″W	Blackduck	One of the nation's few intact camps of the Civilian Conservation Corps, the most acclaimed New Deal program and a key influence on the conservation movement. Contains 17 contributing properties built 1935–1941.
12	Saum Schools	Saum Schools	March 27, 1980 (#80001937)	County Highway 23; 47°58′35″N 94°40′34″W	Kelliher	1903 log one-room school and 1912 school building—the state's first purpose-built consolidated school—representing the early-20th-century development of education in northern Minnesota.
13	Three Island Park Site	Three Island Park Site	July 25, 2012 (#12000427)	Three Island Lake County Park; 47°37′30″N 94°46′56″W	Port Hope Township	Woodland period seasonal fishing camp chiefly associated with the Blackduck-Kathio Complex of 600–1100 CE.

== See also ==
- List of National Historic Landmarks in Minnesota
- National Register of Historic Places listings in Minnesota
