= Minnesota and International Railway Trestle at Blackduck =

- U.S. National Register of Historic Places
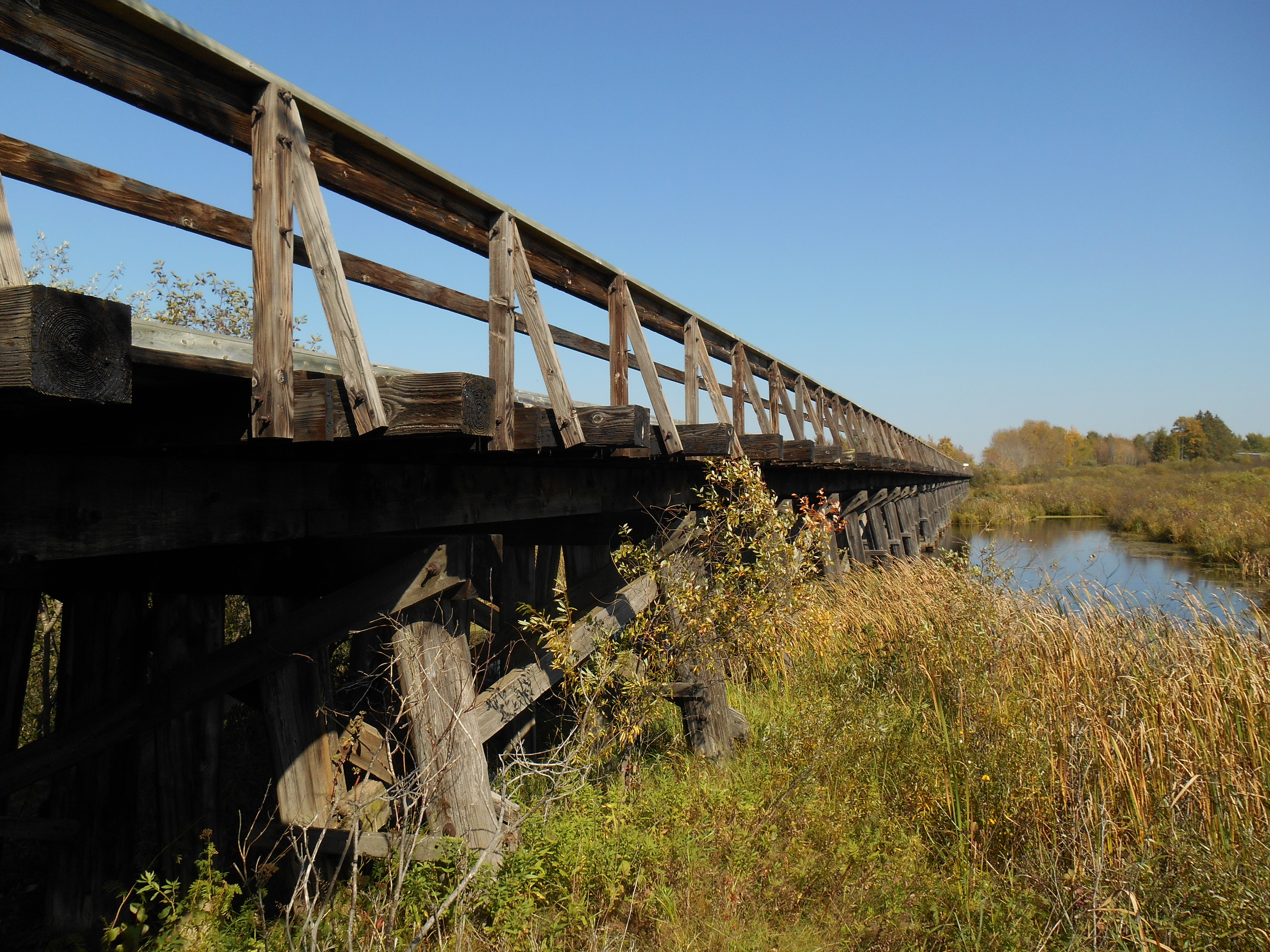

- Location within Minnesota Location within the United States
- Location: 0.25 miles (0.40 km) north of junction CSAH 39, Blackduck,
- Coordinates: 47°43′34″N 94°32′52″W
- Area: less than one acre
- Built: 1901
- NRHP reference No.: 13001144
- Added to NRHP: February 5, 2014

The Minnesota and International Railway Trestle at Blackduck in Beltrami County, Minnesota was the longest timber trestle in the state. It was built in 1901 and 1902 by the Minnesota and International Railway, a subsidiary of the Northern Pacific Railroad, on a line between Koochiching (now International Falls) and Bemidji, Minnesota, where it met a branch line of the parent railroad running north from Brainerd. The bridge carried the railroad over Coburn Creek and a difficult marsh in Blackduck and was noted for its considerable length and intact substructure when it was added to the National Register of Historic Places 2014.

The bridge was a low structure 701 feet (210 m) long. After the railroad was abandoned the trestle became part of the Blue Ox Trail, a recreational trail used by hikers and snowmobilers. More than one-third of it was burned by arson in April 2015. Efforts have been made to raise funds to rebuild the destroyed portion of the bridge.

== See also ==
- List of bridges on the National Register of Historic Places in Minnesota
- National Register of Historic Places listings in Beltrami County, Minnesota
