= Bemidji Carnegie Library =

- U.S. National Register of Historic Places
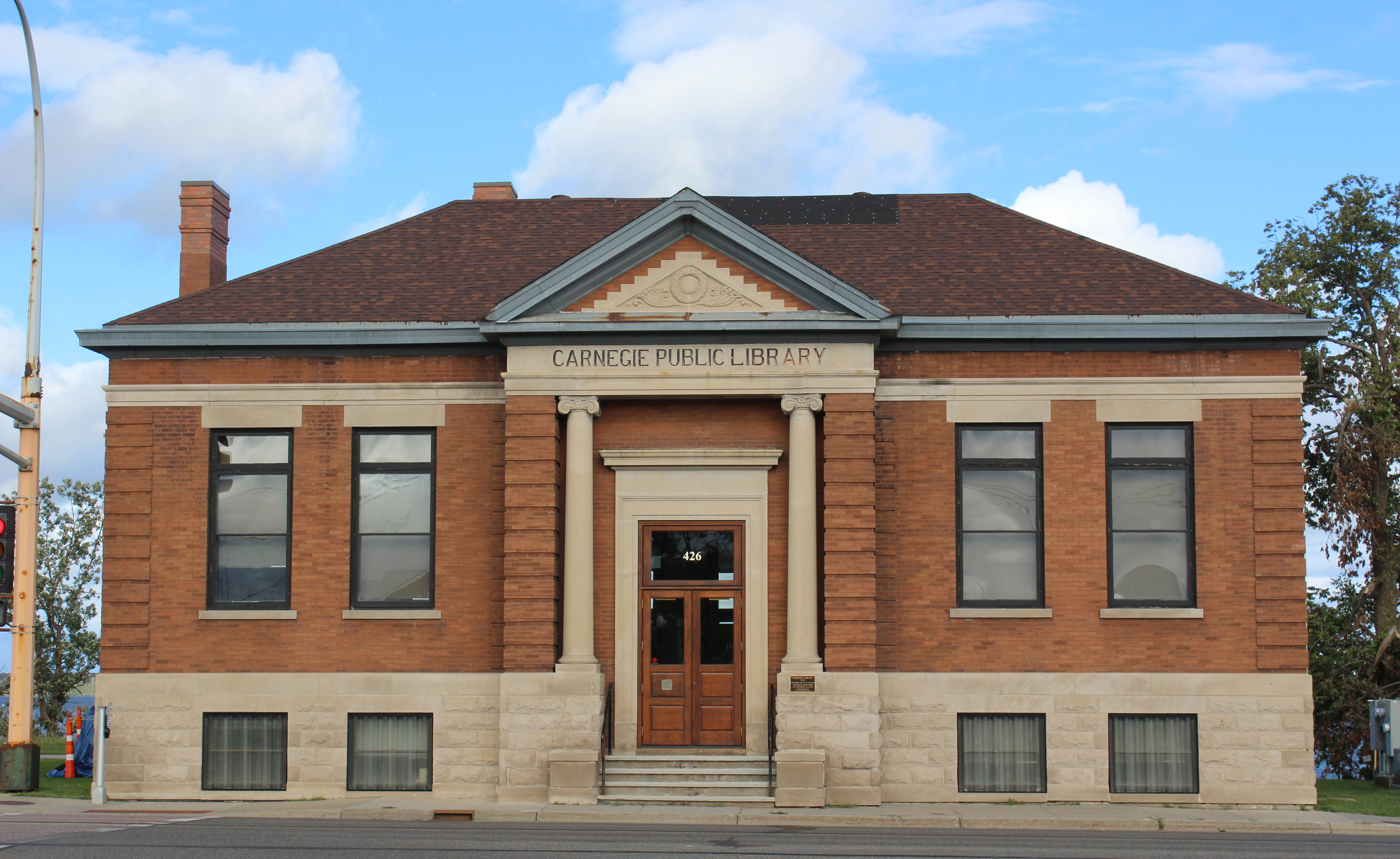
- Bemidji Carnegie Library

- Location within Minnesota Location within the United States
- Location: 426 Bemidji Avenue, Bemidji, Minnesota
- Coordinates: 47°28′21.5″N 94°52′46″W
- Area: Less than one acre
- Built: 1909
- Architect: Haxby & Gillespie
- Architectural style: Neoclassical
- NRHP reference No.: 80001936
- Designated: November 25, 1980

The Bemidji Carnegie Library is a former library building in Bemidji, Minnesota, United States. It was built as a Carnegie library in 1909 and housed the city's public library until 1961. It was listed on the National Register of Historic Places in 1980 for its local significance in the themes of architecture and education. It was nominated for being a well-preserved example of a Carnegie library and of public Neoclassical architecture.

The aging and deficient structure was threatened with demolition in the early 21st century, but received a $2.2 million restoration in 2019. The city of Bemidji now rents out the main floor as an event venue while leasing space in the basement as offices.

== Description ==
The building is located on the banks of Lake Bemidji in Library Park, on a 50-by-60-foot (15 by 18 m) lot. It is a typical one-story, rectangular, brick-and-stone library structure, Neoclassical in style. The exterior is made of brown brick with Indiana Limestone trim. It is covered with a low hip roof and is set upon a high basement, 5 feet (1.5 m) above grade. The basement is the full size of the building.

Inside, a stone staircase led to the library's main-floor circulation desk (in the building's center, under a low dome) and two reading rooms; book stacks and stock rooms offered storage and work space behind it. Varnished oak woodwork provided elegant decoration throughout the main floor.

== Origin ==
The first Bemidji library was housed in the city's old courthouse. After a new Beltrami County Courthouse was constructed in 1902, the library was moved to the lower level of that building. The Bemidji Public Library Association was formed in 1904.

After three years of fundraising, the Bemidji Public Library was established on February 25, 1907. In 1908, Bemidji Library Board chairman A. P. Ritchie wrote to Andrew Carnegie to inquire about the possibility of funding for a new library building. On March 23, 1908, the city council commenced proceedings to vacate Fifth Street east of Bemidji Avenue to make room for a construction site.

The library's original design included porches on either side of the building, overlooking the lake. The board and the architects intended for these porches to be used in the evening, when the sun shines into the building from the west. Carnegie, however, thought they were unnecessary, and the porches were dropped from the plans, lowering the cost of the building to within the amount of Carnegie's donation of $12,500 (equivalent to $447,917 in 2025).

Thomas Johnson of Bemidji was the construction project's lowest bidder and was awarded the contract for the sum of $11,300 on August 7, 1909. The building was to be completed by January 1, 1910. Johnson completed the work on time, and the building was occupied during the winter and dedicated the following June.

Although the porches the architects designed were never built, doors were installed on the library's eastern (lakeside) façade, perhaps to allow for the future construction of reading porches. While an appropriation was never made for such an addition, it remained feasible.

== Later history ==
Work crews thoroughly remodeled the building in 1940. The story of the remodeling, complete with pictures, made the pages of the Minneapolis Tribune. City improvement projects in the 1950s widened Bemidji Avenue in front of the library, increasing traffic and making it more hazardous to cross the street.

The building stopped operating as a library on November 28, 1961, when the Bemidji Public Library moved into a larger building. It was recognized as a historic property and placed on the National Register of Historic Places on November 25, 1980. The Beltrami County Welfare Board occupied the space for a time. The nonprofit Bemidji Community Arts Council tenanted the building beginning in 1983. They maintained an art gallery in the former library and rented portions of it as studio space for local artists.

A major restoration largely funded by donations and grants was completed in August 2019. The interior and exterior were restored, an accessible entrance added to the rear, and the windows and HVAC system modernized. Preservation advocates initially hoped to move the building back from the street, but this proved financially infeasible.

== See also ==
- List of Carnegie libraries in Minnesota
- National Register of Historic Places listings in Beltrami County, Minnesota
