= Bemidji station =

- Great Northern Depot
- U.S. National Register of Historic Places
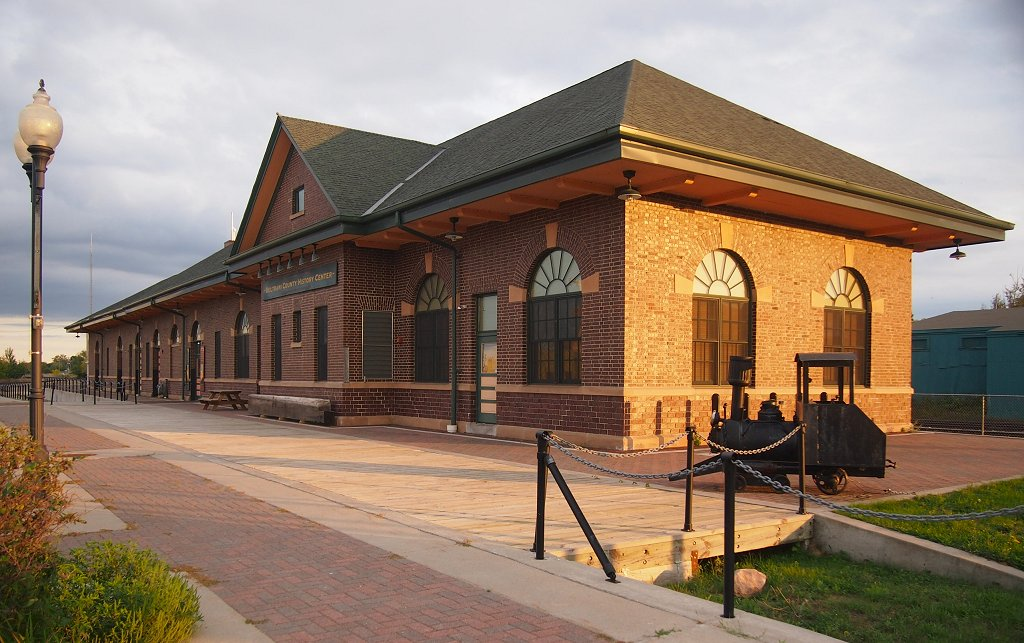
- Bemidji's Great Northern Depot viewed from the northwest

- Location within Minnesota Location within the United States
- Location: 130 Minnesota Avenue SW, Bemidji, Minnesota
- Coordinates: 47°28′3″N 94°52′56″W
- Area: Less than one acre
- Built: 1912–13
- Architectural style: Neoclassical/Arts and Crafts
- NRHP reference No.: 88000673
- Designated: May 26, 1988

Bemidji station is a former Great Northern Railway depot in Bemidji, Minnesota, United States. It opened in 1913, replacing a wooden structure built in 1898. It was the last depot commissioned by railroad magnate James J. Hill.

The depot served passengers until the late 1950s and continued as a freight depot until the mid-1980s, when it was closed, boarded up, and abandoned. In 1988 it was listed on the National Register of Historic Places as the Great Northern Depot for its local significance in the themes of exploration/settlement and transportation. It was nominated for being Bemidji's only intact early-20th-century railroad building, symbolizing the rail access that transformed the settlement into a logging boomtown and regional trade center.

Empty and deteriorating, the building was slated for demolition in the late 20th century. It was saved by a nearly $2 million adaptive reuse effort and now houses the Beltrami County History Center, operated by the Beltrami County Historical Society.

== Description ==
The building is a one-story structure of brick and limestone, with a hip roof. The architecture is generally neoclassical, as evoked by the arched windows, doors, and façade, but it also has influences of the Arts and Crafts style, as shown by the wide eaves and the design of the windows.

The interior, measuring 7,000 square feet (650 m^{2}), contained separate waiting areas for men and women. Each waiting room had settees, and the ladies' room had several rocking chairs. The center of the building housed the ticket office, and the east end had baggage rooms and a freight room. A small, windowed projection on the south side allowed views of the tracks from both directions. All wires entered the new structure from the rear, so as not to distract from the aesthetics of the building.

== Origin ==
Bemidji's first Great Northern Depot was a wooden structure built in 1898 and enlarged in 1901. In 1903, electricity was added, and in 1905, a baggage room, but the old depot was still insufficient. By 1907, the Bemidji Commercial Club had started a push for a new station. The old depot was too small, not well ventilated, and couldn't handle the traffic that was coming through Bemidji.

In June 1911, pleas went out to the Great Northern Railway to build a new depot. Governor Adolph Olson Eberhart and Louis W. Hill, president of the railway and son of James J. Hill, visited Bemidji. The Bemidji Commercial Club treated them to dinner at the Markham Hotel and took them by boat around Lake Bemidji. Afterward, local businessmen rode with Louis Hill in his private coach on the train for further discussion.

In January 1912, James J. Hill, chairman of the board of the Great Northern Railway, came to Bemidji. He spoke at the Armory on Bemidji Avenue; the Commercial Club entertained him at the Markham Hotel and escorted him around the city.

On April 25, 1912, a headline in the Bemidji Daily Pioneer announced: "Hill Promises a New Brick Building". Work was to start immediately. Plans that had been drawn up the previous year were re-examined because they called for an expensive "Permanent Type A depot, usually built for towns of 20,000 or more." But when Hill visited Bemidji, the first thing he noticed when he stepped off the train was an impressive new brick Minnesota and International Railway depot just down the tracks to the east. "We will build a depot and a good one," he said. The original plans were approved for a 217-foot-long (66 m), 7,000-square-foot (650 m^{2}) building with a red brick and sandstone exterior.

Most of the work on the depot was completed before the end of 1912. Thousands of people toured the depot for its grand opening on January 16, 1913.

Hill returned to Bemidji by train for the grand opening and spoke at a banquet at the Markham Hotel that evening. He told the crowd he'd taken special care to see to the depot's completion since it would be his last.

== Beltrami County History Center ==
The depot served passengers until the late 1950s and continued as a freight depot until the mid-1980s, when it was closed, boarded up, and abandoned. It was placed on the National Register of Historic Places in 1988, but without a tenant, the building was damaged by water seepage and vandals and dirtied by pigeons, bats, and rodents. The depot had become a liability to the railroad company, by then the Burlington Northern Railroad. Orders were sent to demolish the building.

Thanks to railroad superintendent Roger Mackenroth who put the demolition orders on hold, the hard work and fundraising of a devoted Historical Society Museum Committee, and a state capital bonding bill for $650,000, the building was saved and renovated at a cost of nearly two million dollars. It reopened as the home of the Beltrami County Historical Society in October 2000.

The rail line is still in active use by the BNSF Railway.

== See also ==
- National Register of Historic Places listings in Beltrami County, Minnesota

Preceding station	Great Northern Railway	Following station
Wilton toward Grand Forks	Grand Forks – Duluth	Rosby toward Duluth
