= Debs Consolidated School =

- U.S. National Register of Historic Places
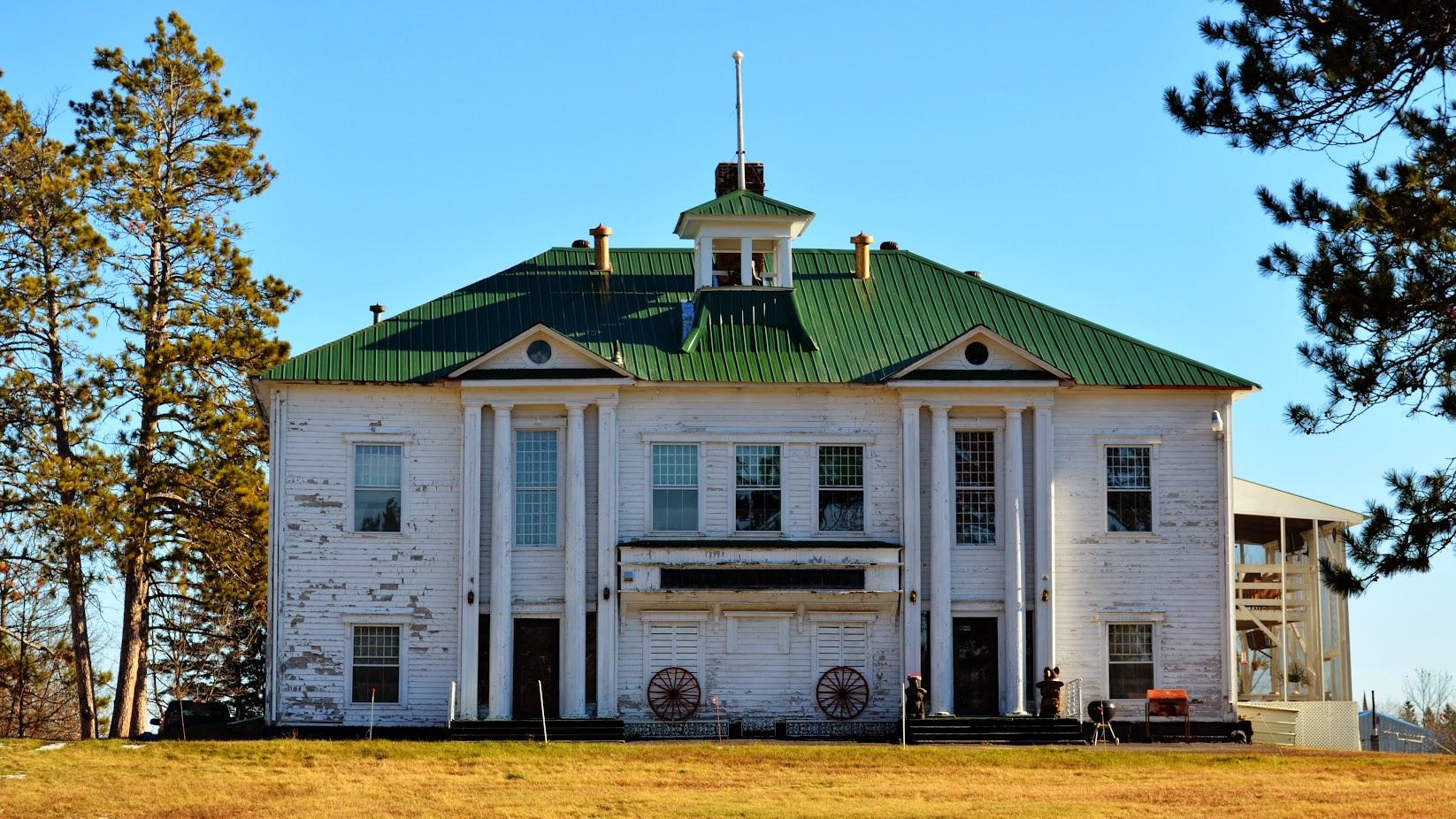

- Location within Minnesota Location within the United States
- Location: Debs, Minnesota
- Coordinates: 47°43′51.5″N 95°7′43.4″W
- Area: 2.5 acres (1.0 ha)
- Built: 1914
- Architectural style: Neoclassical
- NRHP reference No.: 88002083
- Added to NRHP: October 27, 1988

Debs Consolidated School, also called District School No. 132, is a historic rural schoolhouse in Debs, Beltrami County, Minnesota United States. The school held classes for both upper and lower grades until the 1940s. The upper grade students were then transported to a high school in nearby Bemidji, Minnesota. The school continued to hold classes for lower grades until 1970. It was then purchased by a private individual and remodeled into a summer home. Its nomination to the National Register of Historic Places noted its unusual wooden Neoclassical façade.

== See also ==
- National Register of Historic Places listings in Beltrami County, Minnesota
