= Alvwood, Minnesota =

Unincorporated community in Minnesota, United States

Alvwood
- Unincorporated community
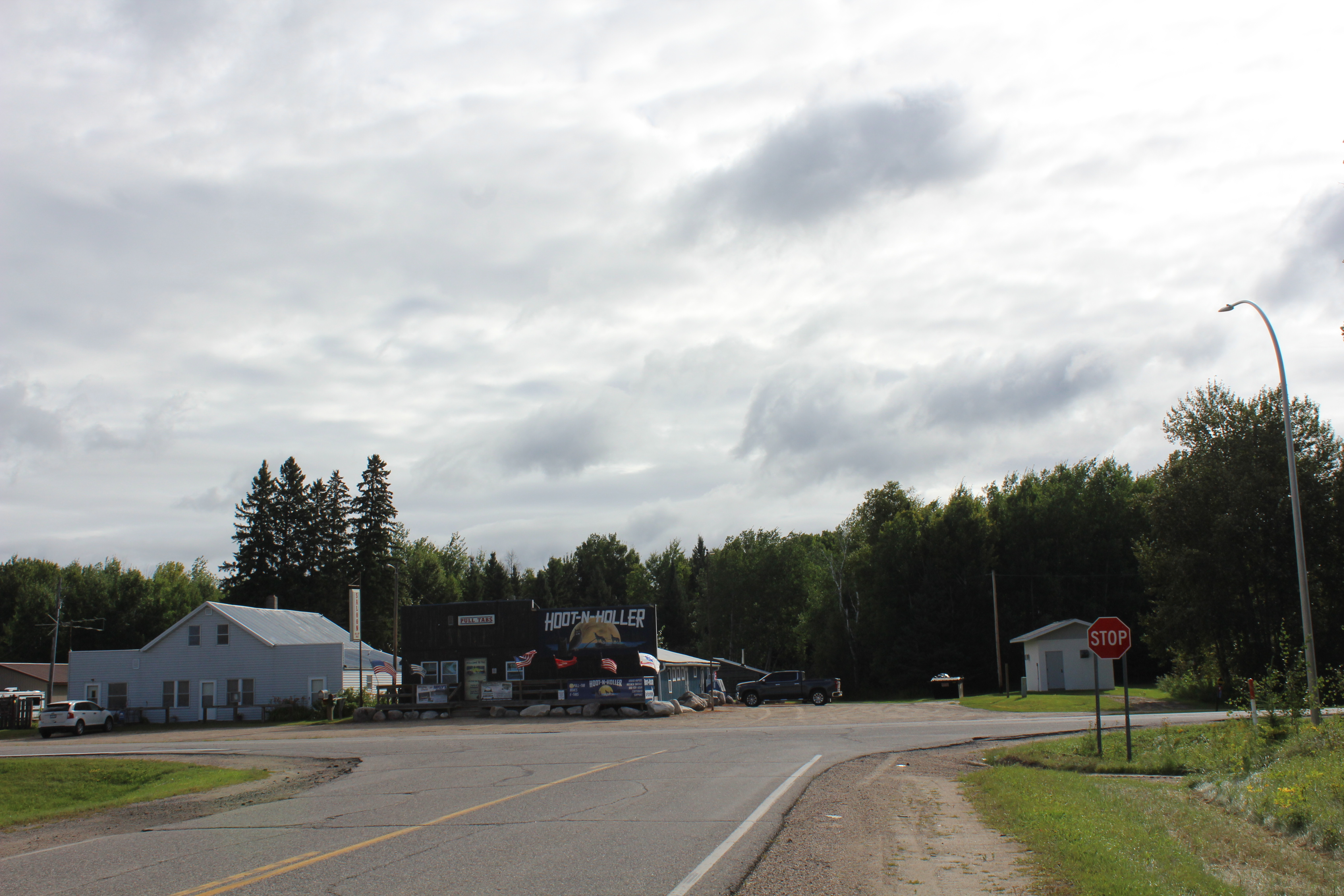
- Intersection of County Rd 13 at Hwy 46 (Avenue of the Pines Scenic Byway)

- Location within Minnesota Location within the United States
- Coordinates: 47°43′50″N 94°16′05″W
- Country: United States
- State: Minnesota
- County: Itasca
- Township: Alvwood Township
- Elevation: 1,381 ft (421 m)

Population
  - Total: 30
- Time zone: UTC-6 (Central (CST))
  - Summer (DST): UTC-5 (CDT)
- ZIP code: 56630
- Area code: 218
- GNIS feature ID: 655115

Alvwood is an unincorporated community in Alvwood Township, Itasca County, Minnesota, United States.

The community is located between Deer River and Northome at the junction of State Highway 46 (MN 46) and Itasca County Road 13. County Road 29 is also in the vicinity. The Popple River flows through the area.

Nearby places include Squaw Lake, Max, Bergville, Northome, and Blackduck.

Alvwood is located nine miles northwest of Squaw Lake; and 37 miles northwest of Deer River. Alvwood is 13 miles east of Blackduck; and 10 miles south of Northome.

ZIP codes 56630 (Blackduck) and 56661 (Northome) meet near Alvwood. The Chippewa National Forest and the Blackduck State Forest are both in the area.

The Hoot n Holler is a popular drinkery in Alvwood that hosts patrons year round, but receives very large crowds during the Minnesota deer hunting season. The Hoot n Holler is known for its decor of decorated one dollar bills stapled to the walls from visitors.
