= Nymore Bridge =

- U.S. National Register of Historic Places
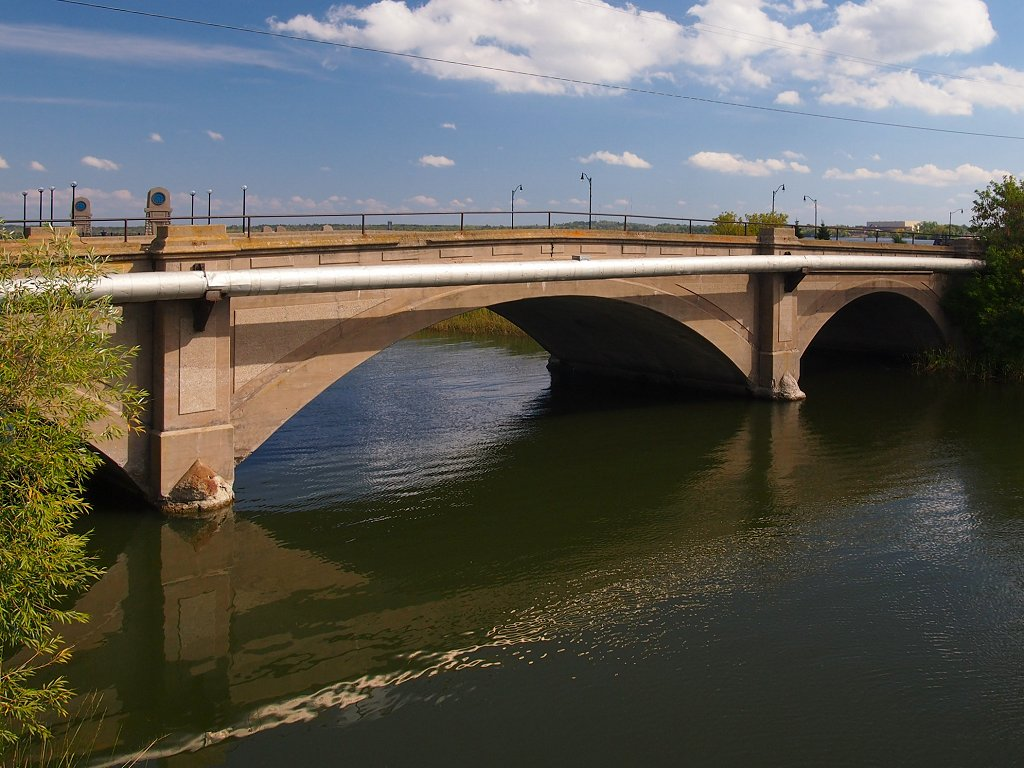

- Location within Minnesota Location within the United States
- Location: MN 197 (First Street) over the Mississippi River, Bemidji, Minnesota
- Coordinates: 47°28′1″N 94°52′42″W
- Area: less than one acre
- Built: 1917
- Built by: Standard Reinforced Concrete Co.
- Architect: Cheney, George M.
- Architectural style: Classical Revival, Reinforced-concrete bridge
- MPS: Reinforced-Concrete Highway Bridges in Minnesota MPS
- NRHP reference No.: 89001849
- Added to NRHP: November 6, 1989

The Nymore Bridge is a reinforced concrete deck arch bridge spanning the Mississippi River in Bemidji, Minnesota. The bridge, built in 1916, has three arch spans. It is significant for its use of a reinforcing system patented by George M. Cheney during a time when engineers were experimenting with reinforcing materials and systems.

The bridge was originally built to carry U.S. Route 2 (US 2) over the Mississippi River. The main city traffic is now carried by Minnesota State Highway 197 (MN 197), while US 2 now bypasses the city. The reinforcing system designed by George M. Cheney consists of an arched metal truss built of angles and gusset plates, separated into vertical panels, and then connected together. The metal truss was built first, then forms were constructed around it and concrete was poured around it. The steel truss becomes embedded in the concrete. The bridge is decorated with Classical Revival elements. The Classical Revival style was part of the City Beautiful movement popular at the time for civic structures. It connected Bemidji with the village of Nymore, which was later annexed into the city of Bemidji.

The bridge is 168 feet (51 m) long, 31 feet (9.4 m) wide, and has a center span of 65 feet (20 m) with two adjacent spans of 40 feet (12 m) each. The maximum vertical clearance is 15 feet (4.6 m).

== See also ==
- List of crossings of the Upper Mississippi River
- List of bridges on the National Register of Historic Places in Minnesota
- National Register of Historic Places listings in Beltrami County, Minnesota
