= Bergville, Minnesota =

Unincorporated community in Minnesota, United States

Bergville
- Unincorporated community
- Location within Minnesota Location within the United States
- Coordinates: 47°47′15″N 94°15′52″W
- Country: United States
- State: Minnesota
- County: Itasca
- Township: Ardenhurst Township
- Elevation: 1,411 ft (430 m)

Population
  - Total: 10
- Time zone: UTC-6 (Central (CST))
  - Summer (DST): UTC-5 (CDT)
- ZIP code: 56661
- Area code: 218
- GNIS feature ID: 655339

Bergville is an unincorporated community in Ardenhurst Township, Itasca County, Minnesota, United States; located within the Chippewa National Forest.

The community is located between Deer River and Northome at the junction of State Highway 46 (MN 46) and Itasca County Road 31.

Nearby places include Northome, Alvwood, Squaw Lake, and Blackduck.

Bergville is located six miles south of Northome and 41 miles northwest of Deer River. Bergville is also located 13 miles northwest of Squaw Lake and 17 miles northeast of Blackduck. The boundary line between Itasca and Koochiching counties is nearby.
