= Parkhouse =

Parkhouse may refer to:

== People ==
- Adam Parkhouse (born 1992), Australian footballer
- Annie Parkhouse, British comics artist
- Gilbert Parkhouse (1925–2000), Welsh cricketer
- George Parkhouse (1900–1967), American politician
- Jaynie Parkhouse (born 1956), New Zealand swimmer
- Richard Parkhouse (1910–1984), Welsh cricketer
- Steve Parkhouse, British comics artist

== Other uses ==
- Ayr Parkhouse F.C., a defunct Scottish football club
- Parkhouse, Glasgow G22, a neighbourhood in the north of Glasgow, Scotland
- Possilpark & Parkhouse railway station, serving the above community
- Parkhouse, Glasgow G53, another Glasgow neighbourhood (south side near Nitshill)
- Parkhouse Halt railway station, a closed railway station in Cumbria, England
- Parkhouse Hill, a natural feature in Derbyshire, England

== See also ==
- Park House (disambiguation)
