= Funkley, Minnesota =

City in Minnesota, United States

- City
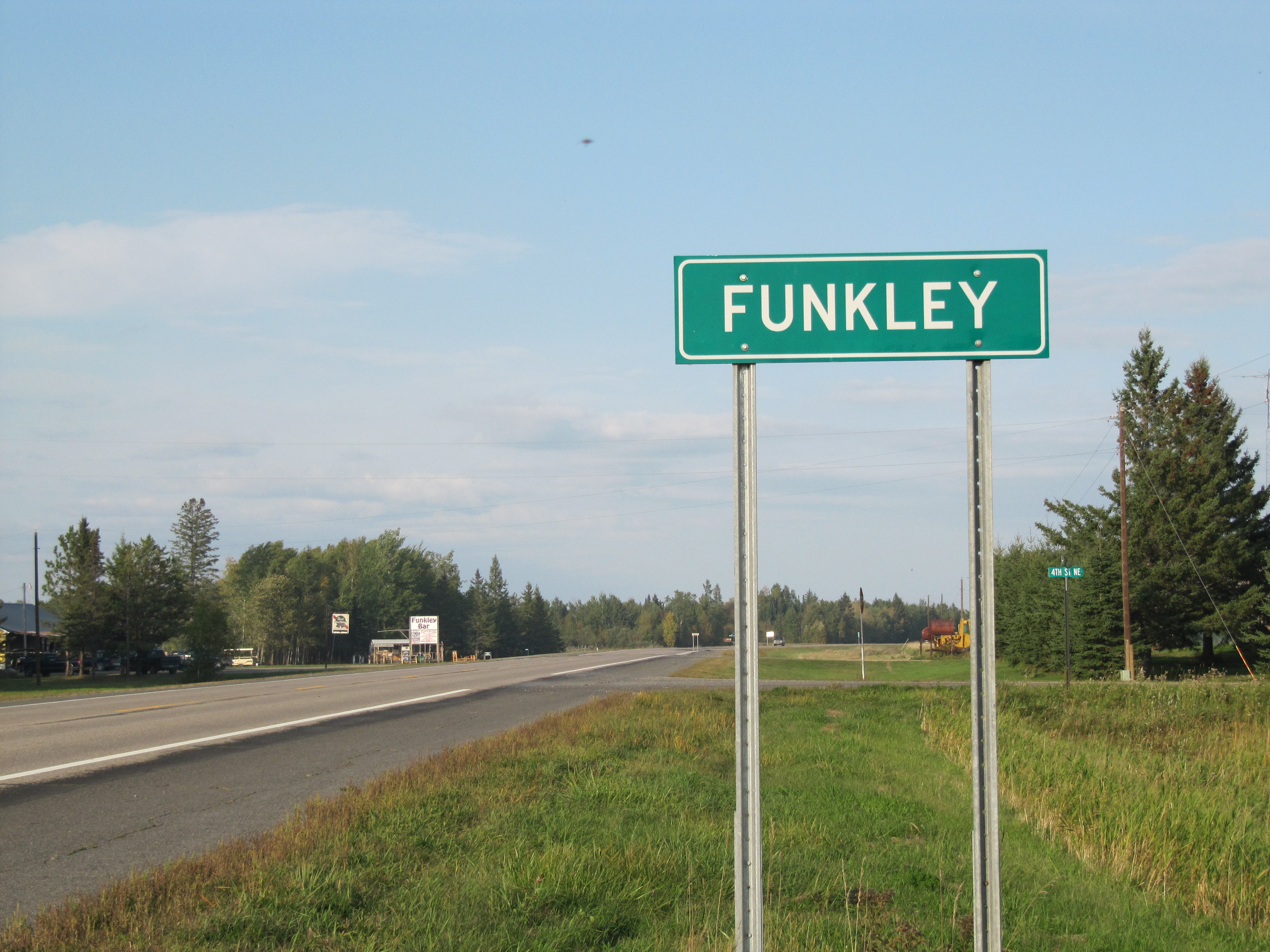
- Funkley, MN Road Sign and Bar

- Location of Funkley, Minnesota
- Coordinates: 47°47′15″N 94°25′58″W
- Country: United States
- State: Minnesota
- County: Beltrami
- Incorporated: 1904

Government
  - Mayor: Emil Erickson

Area
  - Total: 0.756 sq mi (1.958 km^{2})
  - Land: 0.756 sq mi (1.958 km^{2})
  - Water: 0 sq mi (0.000 km^{2})
- Elevation: 1,391 ft (424 m)

Population (2020)
  - Total: 18
  - Estimate (2023): 12
  - Density: 23.8/sq mi (9.19/km^{2})
- Time zone: UTC−6 (Central (CST))
  - Summer (DST): UTC−5 (CDT)
- ZIP Code: 56630
- Area code: 218
- FIPS code: 27-22976
- GNIS feature ID: 0656344
- Sales tax: 7.375%

Funkley is a city in Beltrami County, Minnesota, United States. The population was 18 at the 2020 census, making the city the second-least populous incorporated place in Minnesota. It shared that distinction with Tenney until the latter dissolved in 2011.

== History ==
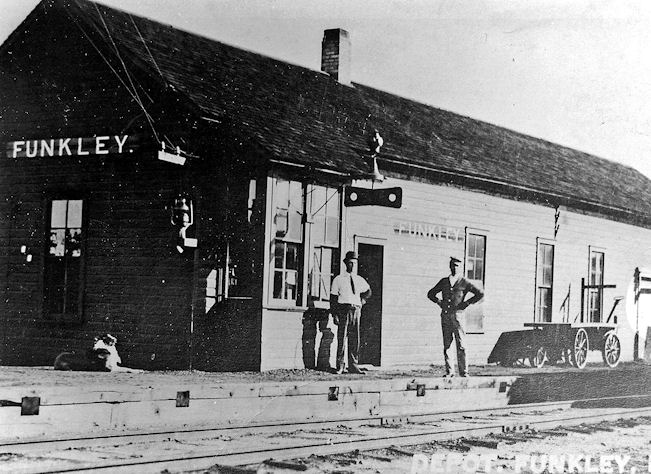
Funkley Depot Station, ca. 1910

Funkley was incorporated in 1904 at the site of a junction along the Minnesota and International Railway. The name comes from Henry Funkley, a county attorney.

== Post Office ==
Funkley's Post Office was established in 1903 and remained in operation until 1967. Now Funkley is served by the Blackduck Post Office, which is approximately 7 miles southwest of the town.

== Geography ==
According to the United States Census Bureau, the city has a total area of 0.60 square miles (1.55 km^{2}), all land.

== Demographics ==
Historical population
Census	Pop.	Note	%±
1910	59		—
1920	56		−5.1%
1930	60		7.1%
1940	26		−56.7%
1950	28		7.7%
1960	28		0.0%
1970	19		−32.1%
1980	18		−5.3%
1990	15		−16.7%
2000	15		0.0%
2010	5		−66.7%
2020	18		260.0%
2023 (est.)	12		−33.3%
U.S. Decennial Census; 2020 Census

=== 2010 census ===
As of the 2010 census, there were 5 people, 5 households, and 0 families living in the city. The population density was 8.3 inhabitants per square mile (3.2/km^{2}). There were 12 housing units at an average density of 20.0 per square mile (7.7/km^{2}). The racial makeup of the city was 80.0% White and 20.0% from two or more races.

There were 5 households, of which 100.0% were non-families. 100.0% of all households were made up of individuals. The average household size was 1.00 and the average family size was 0.00.

The median age in the city was 46.8 years. 0.0% of residents were under the age of 18; 0.0% were between the ages of 18 and 24; 20% were from 25 to 44; 80% were from 45 to 64; and 0.0% were 65 years of age or older. The gender makeup of the city was 20.0% male and 80.0% female.

=== 2000 census ===
As of the 2000 census, there were 15 people, 6 households, and 4 families living in the city. The population density was 38.9 inhabitants per square mile (15.0/km^{2}). There were 12 housing units at an average density of 31.1 per square mile (12.0/km^{2}). The racial makeup of the city was 100.00% White.

There were 6 households, of which 33.3% had children under the age of 18 living with them, 66.7% were married couples living together, 16.7% had a female householder with no husband present, and 16.7% were non-families. 16.7% of all households were made up of individuals, and none had someone living alone who was 65 years of age or older. The average household size was 2.50 and the average family size was 2.60.

In the city, the population was spread out, with 26.7% under the age of 18, 26.7% from 25 to 44, 13.3% from 45 to 64, and 33.3% who were 65 years of age or older. The median age was 38 years. For every 100 females, there were 150.0 males. For every 100 females age 18 and over, there were 120.0 males.

The median income for a household in the city was $26,250, and the median income for a family was $25,625. Males had a median income of $29,167 versus $17,083 for females. The per capita income for the city was $15,521. None of the population and none of the families were below the poverty line.
