= Blackduck Lake =

Lake in the state of Minnesota, United States

- Location within Minnesota
- Location: Beltrami County, Minnesota
- Coordinates: 47°43′55″N 94°37′9″W
- Type: lake

Blackduck Lake is a lake in Beltrami County, Minnesota, in the United States.

Blackduck Lake was named for the Ring-necked duck, Blackduck was named after this lake.

== See also ==
- List of lakes in Minnesota
