= Beltrami County Courthouse =

- U.S. National Register of Historic Places
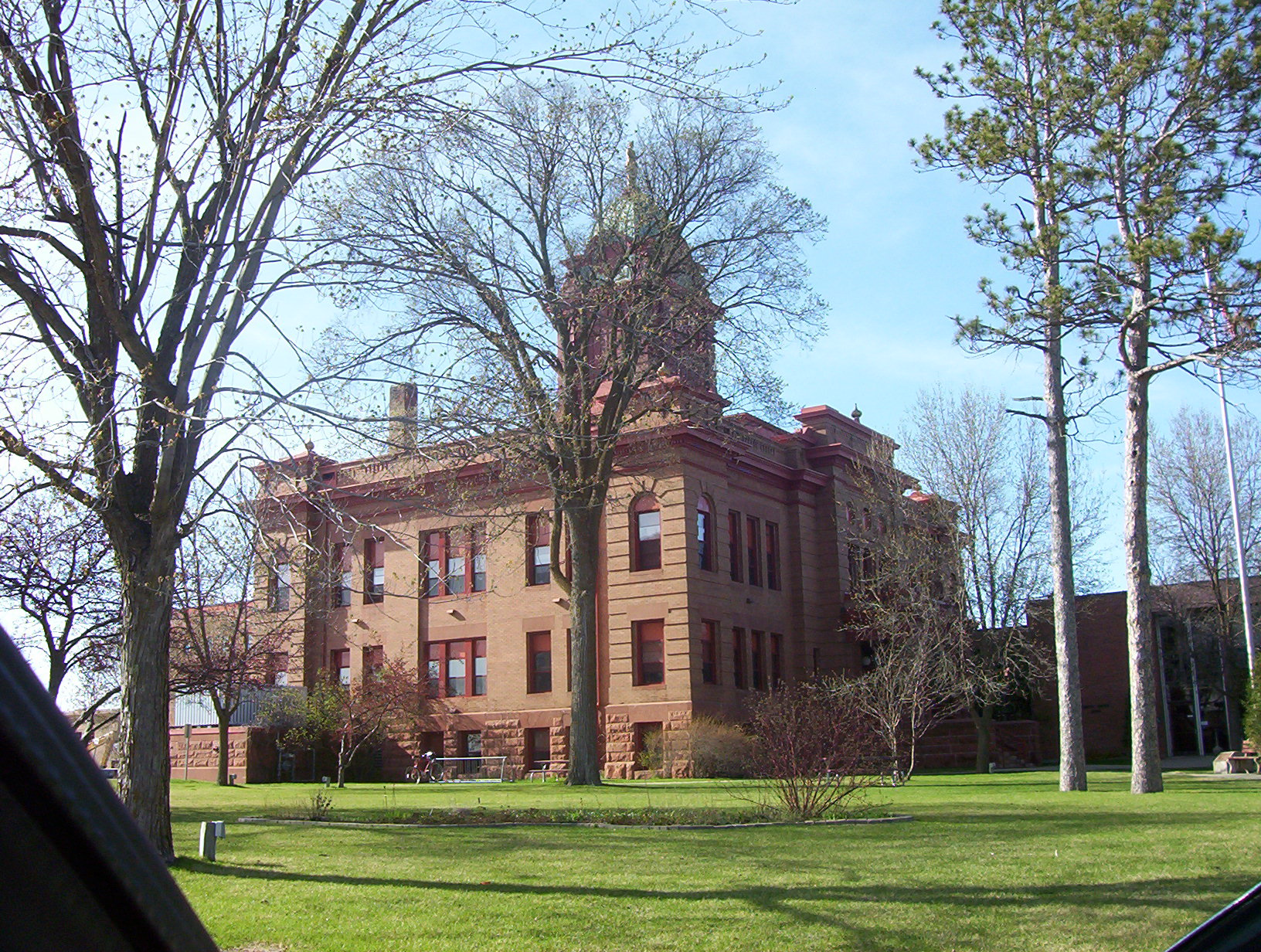
- The Beltrami County Courthouse viewed from the southeast

- Location within Minnesota Location within the United States
- Interactive map showing the location of Beltrami County Courthouse
- Location: 619 Beltrami Avenue NW, Bemidji, Minnesota
- Coordinates: 47°28′27″N 94°52′55″W
- Area: Less than one acre
- Built: 1902
- Built by: Schmidt Brothers
- Architect: Kinney & Detweiler
- Architectural style: Beaux-Arts
- NRHP reference No.: 88000665
- Added to NRHP: May 26, 1988

The Beltrami County Courthouse is a historic government building in Bemidji, Minnesota, United States. It was erected in 1902 as the seat of government for Beltrami County. District court functions relocated in 1974 to the newly completed Beltrami County Judicial Center immediately to the southwest, and the historic courthouse has been remodeled to house government offices. The old courthouse was listed on the National Register of Historic Places in 1988 for its state-level significance in the themes of architecture and politics/government. It was nominated for its status in Beltrami County as its long-serving center government and as its most prominent example of public architecture and Beaux-Arts style.

== Description ==
The Beltrami County Courthouse is a three-story, red, brick-and-sandstone building in the Beaux-Arts style. Its most striking feature is its rotunda, which occupies the center of the main hall on the first floor and extends past the second floor into the dome. A railing surmounted by a brass guardrail circles the rotunda on the second floor. On the exterior, a convex dome rises above an arcaded tower topped by a statue of blind Lady Justice with her scale.

== Construction ==
After Beltrami County was organized in 1897, local court proceedings took place in a cold, drafty building on the corner of Fourth Street and Beltrami Avenue. The county grew quickly, and by 1902 citizens were pushing for a new courthouse. In an election held on March 11 that year, voters approved a bond issue of $50,000 (equivalent to $1,860,577 in 2025) to be used for a new jail and courthouse. Although two saloon owners from Shevlin challenged the legality of the bond election, a judge dismissed their case on June 7, 1902, and construction of the new courthouse began.

At the time, Beltrami County already owned all of the land in Block Seven, between Sixth and Seventh Streets, which was only a few blocks north of the old courthouse. Architects Kinney & Detweiler of Minneapolis drew up plans for a Beaux-Arts-style building, square in shape, to be constructed out of red sandstone and bricks from a local brickyard.

A bid of $39,975 from Schmidt Bros. was accepted on May 24, 1902, with the understanding that the courthouse would be ready for occupancy by December 1. While construction was underway, O. M. Jellestad spent thirteen nights at the old building guarding the auditor's and treasurer's records after the vault doors were removed to new courthouse. The county board of commissioners approved the building on December 12, 1902; the court held its first session in the space on January 3, 1903.

== Later history ==
When the building first opened, visitors reached the courtroom via a double flight of stairs. The courtroom, which had covered half of the third floor, was remodeled and condensed to make space for offices in 1937.

The space on the cupola intended for a clock served instead as an open-sky observation point during the Cold War. During the 1950s, volunteers stationed there watched for uncharted planes entering Bemidji airspace. This area was later glassed in.

In 1971, county auditor Wayne Alsop noticed a staircase inside the courthouse leading to an attic. Inside it, he and Jay Griggs discovered artifacts and written records, including tax books dating to 1897, underneath rafters more than ten inches thick. They also found the scales originally held by the statue of Justice, which had fallen down during a 1971 storm and been moved to the attic for storage.

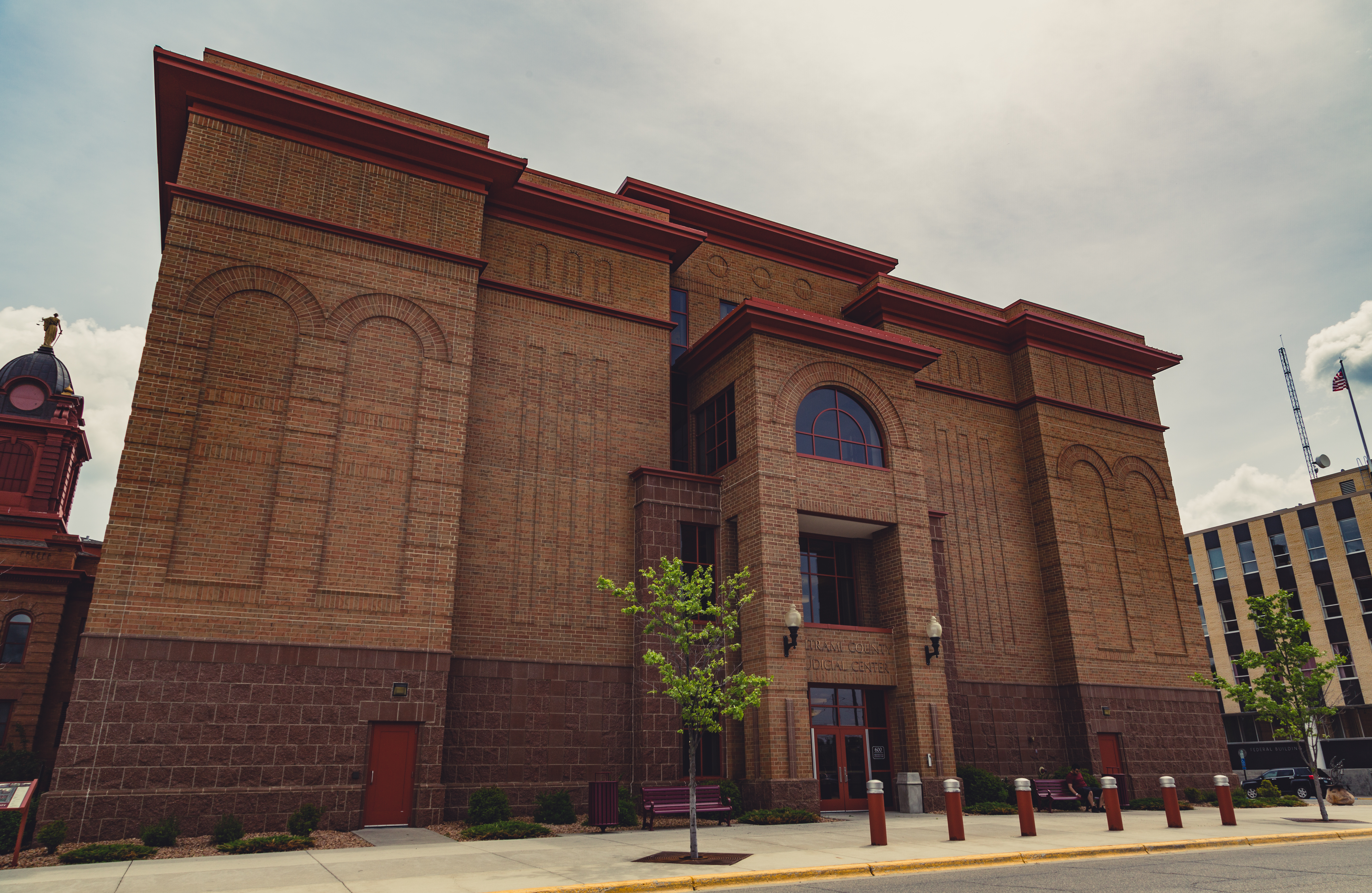
The Beltrami County Judicial Center viewed from the northwest

Construction of a large annex began in June 1973 and ended in July 1974. The finished structure housed two courtrooms on its first floor, and court personnel moved from the old courthouse to the annex in July 1974. In 1976 the county remodeled the old courtroom into office space. On December 13, 1977, one day after the courthouse celebrated its diamond jubilee, the board of commissioners received bids for a complete remodeling at an anticipated price of $425,000 (equivalent to $2,260,000 in 2025).

The building was added to the National Register of Historic Places on May 16, 1988. Thanks to a $20,000 matching grant from the Minnesota Historical Society, it was renovated in 2000. The grant money funded the restoration of the stairs, pillars, and retaining walls at the building's east entrance.

== See also ==
- List of county courthouses in Minnesota
- National Register of Historic Places listings in Beltrami County, Minnesota
