= Park House (New York City) =

Apartment building in Manhattan, New York

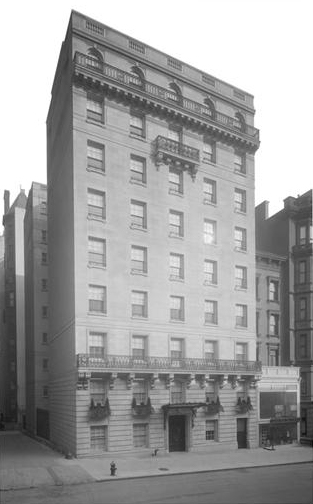
- 135 W 58th Street, 1912

General information
- Architectural style: Beaux-Arts
- Location: 135 West 58th Street; Manhattan, New York 10019; United States
- Coordinates: 40°45′56.13″N 73°58′40.11″W
- Completed: 1911

Technical details
- Floor count: 9

Design and construction
- Architect(s): Walter B. Chambers

Park House (also known as Park House Condominium) is a cooperative apartment building at 135 West 58th Street between Sixth and Seventh Avenues in Midtown Manhattan, New York City. It was built in 1911 and is considered to be one of the most elegant Beaux-Arts apartment houses in Manhattan.

== Architecture ==
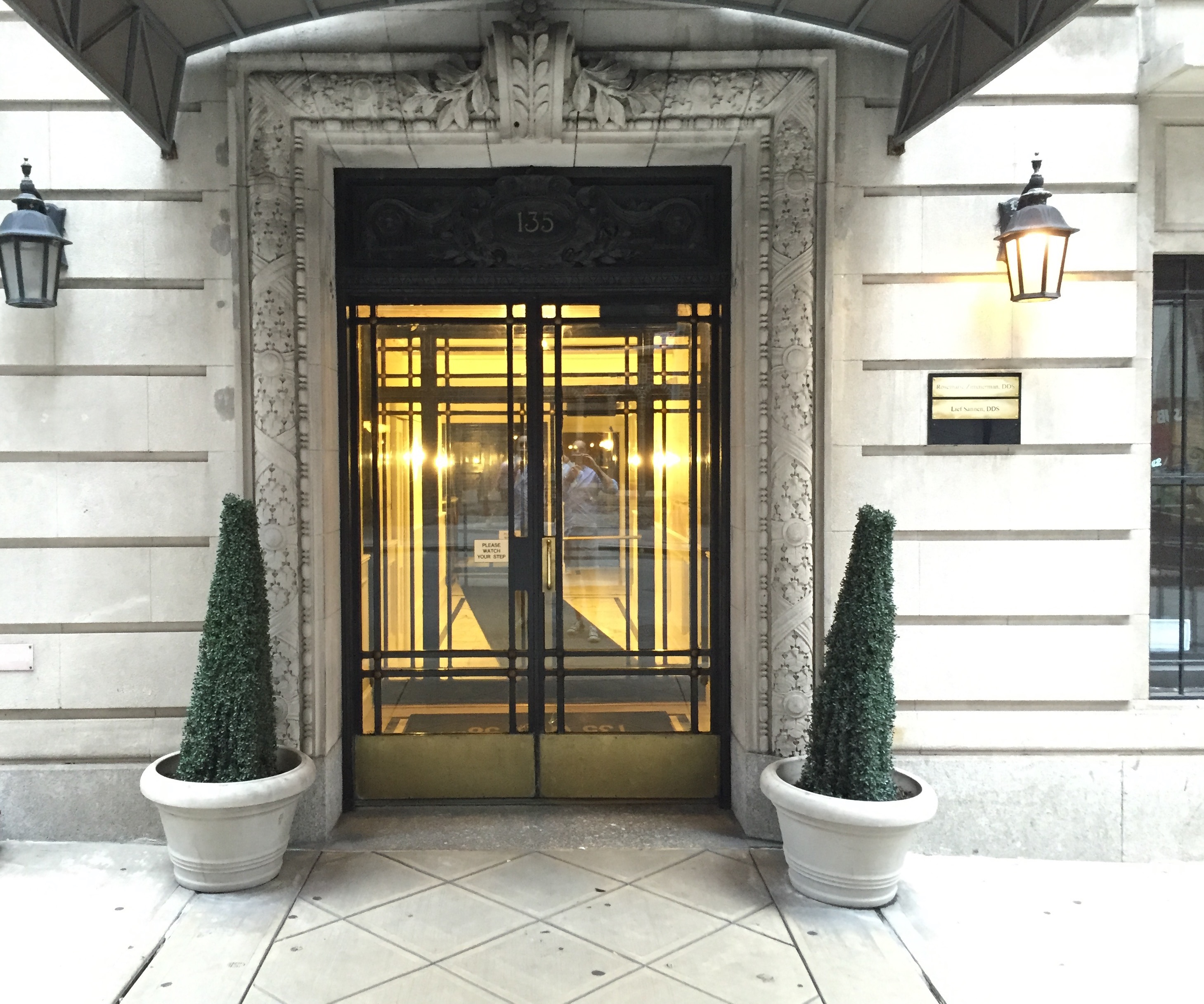
Entrance

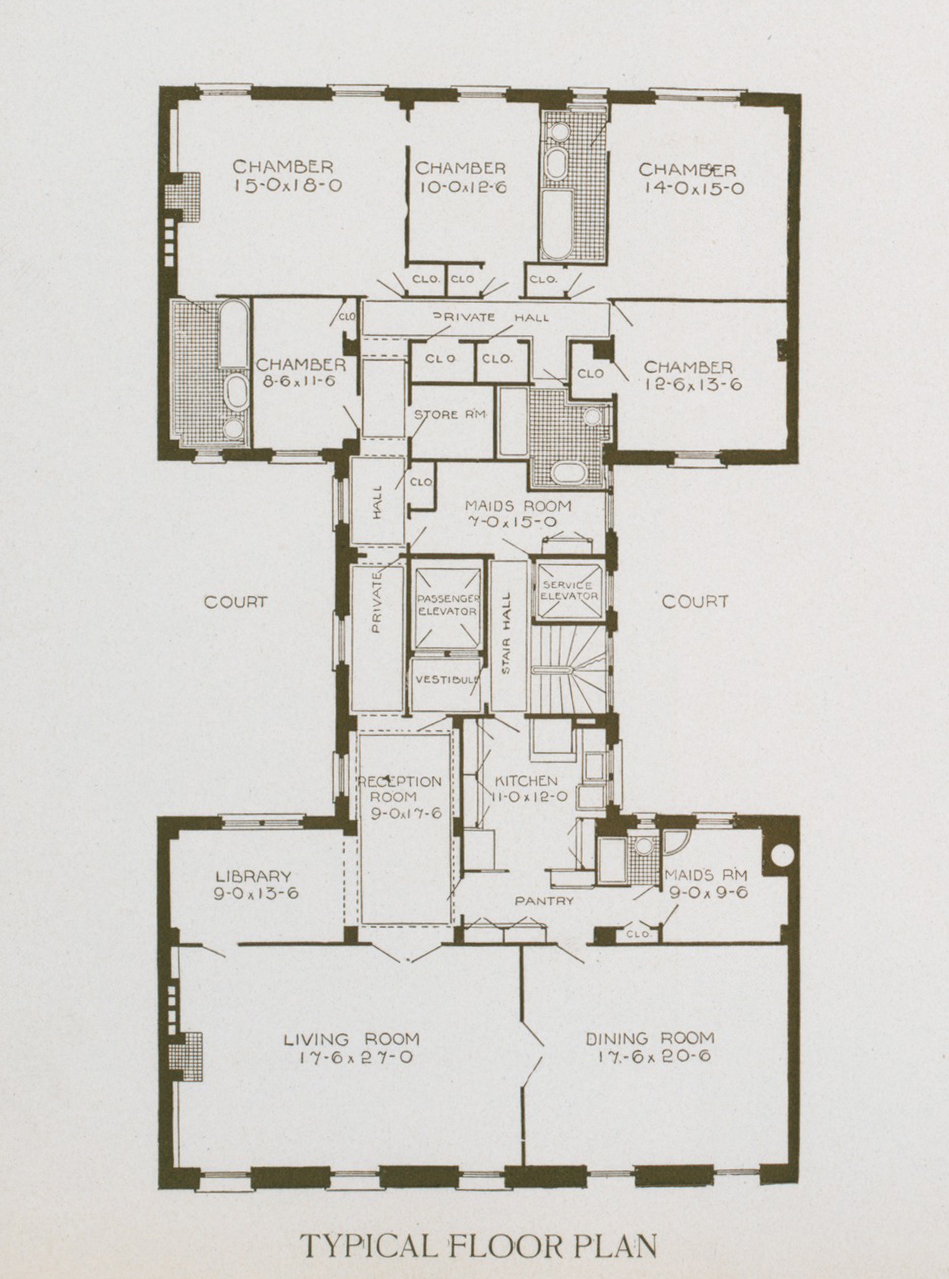
Floor plan

This handsome Beaux-Arts style building was designed by Walter Boughton Chambers, AIA. Walter B. Chambers founded the Atelier Masqueray-Chambers – the first atelier for architectural studies in the United States based on the French Beaux-Arts system. In 1884, Chambers formed a partnership with Ernest Flagg, and their practice is credited with the Corcoran Gallery of Art in Washington, D.C., the United States Capitol in Washington, D.C., McClellan Hall and Bingham Hall at Yale University, and the Gloria Vanderbilt Cooper Residence at 45 East 67th Street, New York.

The building's limestone facade is accented by 2 tiers of balconies, the first at the second floor level, and the last on the uppermost (9th) floor. Additionally a juliet balcony hangs from the central window of the 8th floor. The wrought iron railings feature Greek key motifs in the corners.

Originally, the building consisted of one apartment per floor, consisting of 6 bedrooms, 4 bathrooms, a library and a 17.5 by 47.5 feet (5.3 by 14.5 m) drawing room and dining room.

== History ==
The Park House was constructed in 1911 by the J. Livingston Construction Co. The architectural firm of Flagg & Chambers, a partnership of Walter B. Chambers and Ernest Flagg, were commissioned to design the 9-story building. In 1912, the Park House won an American Institute of Architects Award in the category "1912, Over Six Stories" for architect Walter B. Chambers.
