= Ardenhurst Township, Itasca County, Minnesota =

Ardenhurst Township, Minnesota
- Township
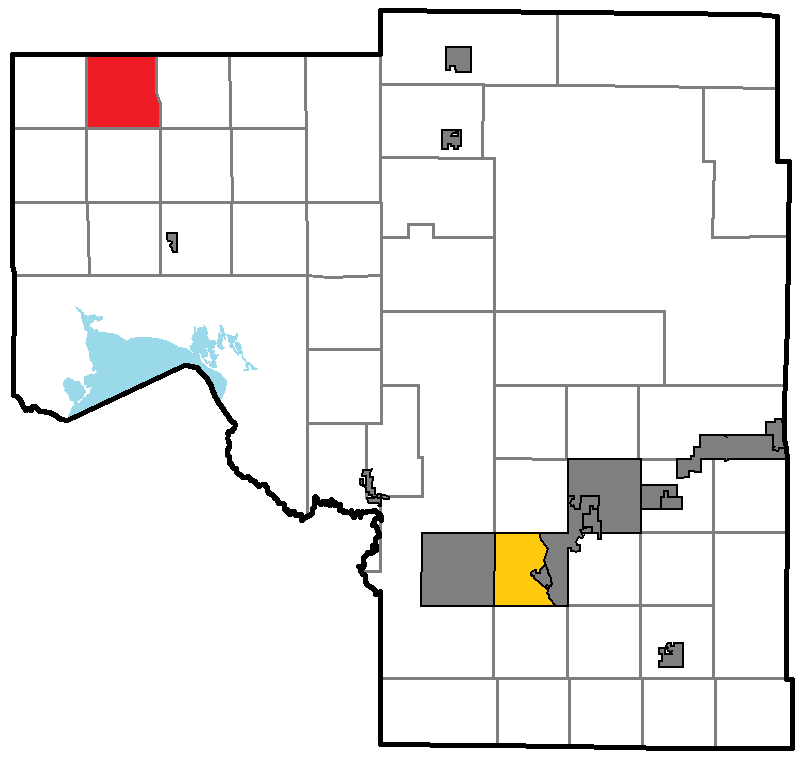
- Location of Ardenhurst Township, within Itasca County, Minnesota
- Coordinates: 47°48′17″N 94°13′13″W
- Country: United States
- State: Minnesota
- County: Itasca

Area
  - Total: 35.1 sq mi (90.8 km^{2})
  - Land: 29.5 sq mi (76.3 km^{2})
  - Water: 5.6 sq mi (14.5 km^{2})
- Elevation: 1,417 ft (432 m)

Population (2020)
  - Total: 147
  - Density: 4.99/sq mi (1.93/km^{2})
- Time zone: UTC-6 (Central (CST))
  - Summer (DST): UTC-5 (CDT)
- FIPS code: 27-02044
- GNIS feature ID: 0663452
- Website: https://www.ardenhursttownship.com/

Ardenhurst Township is a township in Itasca County, Minnesota, United States. The population was 147 at the 2020 census.

Ardenhurst Township derives its name from Ardennes Forest and -hurst, a word meaning hill.

== Geography ==
According to the United States Census Bureau, the township has a total area of 35.1 square miles (91 km^{2}), of which 29.5 square miles (76 km^{2}) is land and 5.6 square miles (15 km^{2}), or 16.00%, is water.

== Demographics ==
At the 2000 census there were 172 people, 68 households, and 53 families living in the township. The population density was 5.8 people per square mile (2.3/km^{2}). There were 171 housing units at an average density of 5.8/sq mi (2.2/km^{2}). The racial makeup of the township was 98.26% White, 1.16% Native American, and 0.58% from two or more races. Of the 68 households 26.5% had children under the age of 18 living with them, 73.5% were married couples living together, and 20.6% were non-families. 19.1% of households were one person and 8.8% were one person aged 65 or older. The average household size was 2.53 and the average family size was 2.87.

The age distribution was 25.0% under the age of 18, 5.2% from 18 to 24, 17.4% from 25 to 44, 30.8% from 45 to 64, and 21.5% 65 or older. The median age was 47 years. For every 100 females, there were 109.8 males. For every 100 females age 18 and over, there were 118.6 males.

The median household income was $29,107 and the median family income was $29,583. Males had a median income of $38,750 versus $11,250 for females. The per capita income for the township was $13,251. About 9.1% of families and 6.3% of the population were below the poverty line, including none of those under the age of eighteen and 7.7% of those sixty five or over.
