= Alvwood Township, Itasca County, Minnesota =

Alvwood Township, Minnesota
- Township
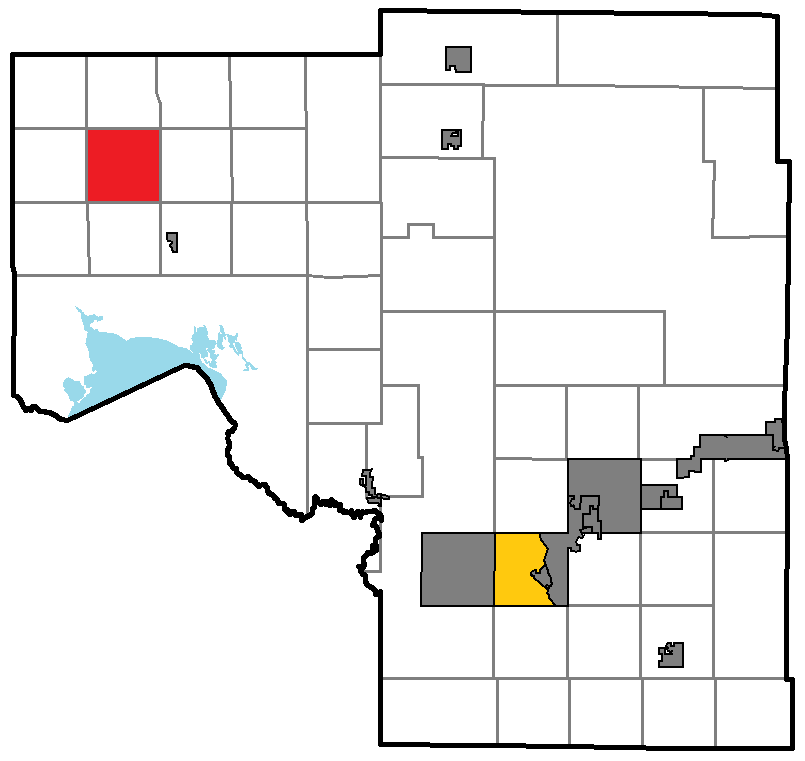
- Location of Alvwood Township, within Itasca County, Minnesota
- Coordinates: 47°43′0″N 94°14′39″W
- Country: United States
- State: Minnesota
- County: Itasca

Area
  - Total: 35.5 sq mi (91.9 km^{2})
  - Land: 35.1 sq mi (90.9 km^{2})
  - Water: 0.39 sq mi (1.0 km^{2})
- Elevation: 1,371 ft (418 m)

Population (2020)
  - Total: 48
  - Density: 1.4/sq mi (0.53/km^{2})
- Time zone: UTC-6 (Central (CST))
  - Summer (DST): UTC-5 (CDT)
- FIPS code: 27-01288
- GNIS feature ID: 0663424

Alvwood Township (/ˈɔːlvwʊd/ AWLV-wuud) is a township in Itasca County, Minnesota, United States. The population was 48 at the 2020 census.

== Geography ==
According to the United States Census Bureau, the township has a total area of 35.5 square miles (92 km^{2}), of which 35.1 square miles (91 km^{2}) is land and 0.4 square miles (1.0 km^{2}), or 1.13%, is water.

== Demographics ==
At the 2000 census there were 74 people, 32 households, and 20 families living in the township. The population density was 2.1 people per square mile (0.8/km^{2}). There were 58 housing units at an average density of 1.7/sq mi (0.6/km^{2}). The racial makeup of the township was 100.00% White. Of the 32 households 28.1% had children under the age of 18 living with them, 50.0% were married couples living together, 9.4% had a female householder with no husband present, and 37.5% were non-families. 31.3% of households were one person and 18.8% were one person aged 65 or older. The average household size was 2.31 and the average family size was 2.90.

The age distribution was 24.3% under the age of 18, 4.1% from 18 to 24, 25.7% from 25 to 44, 29.7% from 45 to 64, and 16.2% 65 or older. The median age was 43 years. For every 100 females, there were 124.2 males. For every 100 females age 18 and over, there were 107.4 males.

The median household income was $19,167 and the median family income was $18,750. Males had a median income of $21,875 versus $15,625 for females. The per capita income for the township was $8,847. There were 43.5% of families and 38.2% of the population living below the poverty line, including 47.1% of under eighteens and 46.2% of those over 64.
