= Whiggle in Line =

Single by Black Duck
- Released: 1994
- Recorded: At the duck pond just next to Bunk, Junk & Genius Studios
- Genre: Eurodance; ragga
- Label: Flying South Records
- Songwriters: Larry Pignagnoli; Davide Riva
- Producers: Davide Riva; Larry Pignagnoli

Music video
- "Whiggle In Line" on YouTube

"Whiggle in Line" is a song by Italian group Black Duck, released as their only single in December 1994 by Flying South Records. It is an electronic Eurodance style take on "Saturday Night" by Danish/Italian act Whigfield. Produced by Davide Riva and Larry Pignagnoli, the producers of the original track, it has an added ragga rap element and slightly different female vocals to the original, which is performed by British singer and TV host Carryl Varley, who also used to front Italian band Jinny. The single was a notable hit in several countries, peaking at number 11 on the Canadian RPM Dance/Urban chart and number 20 in Denmark. In the UK, it reached the top 40, peaking at number 33, but on the UK Dance Chart it fared better, reaching number 12. It also enjoyed modest airplay in the US. The accompanying music video was directed by B. Duck and features a dancing stuffed black duck, hence the group's name. It also features a rapper and Carryl Varley.

== Critical reception ==
In his weekly UK chart commentary, James Masterton wrote, "Repeated plays brought a dose of much-needed hilarity to the office along with the conclusion that it could never be a hit. Clearly we were wrong. With 'Saturday Night' easily the second biggest seller of the year it was inevtiable that a parody would end up being made." He added, "The whole thing is clearly intended as a bit of seasonal fun, even to the extent of requesting donations for duck sanctuaries on the sleeve. Pop music is supposed to be about having fun after all..."

Alan Jones from Music Week noted that Whigfield's debut single "has been turned into an even sillier song than the original", as "a tongue-in-cheek remake, which retains large portions of the original, and adds some ragga to the mix. Released on Flying South, it's another potential hit" Stuart Bailie from NME wrote, "The post-Whigfield techno bushfire burns on. Black Duck lifts the quacking effects from 'Saturday Night' and adds his, erm, remarkable ragga talents on top." James Hamilton from the Record Mirror Dance Update described it as a "useful 130bpm copy of Whigfield's 'Saturday Night' (including quacks) but with an added surprisingly credible gruff ragga rap". Mark Frith from Smash Hits gave it three out of five, calling it "a bizarre novelty record". He added, "The question is, is it a real duck?"

== Track listing ==
- 12", Italy (1994)
1. "Whiggle in Line" (Peking Krispy Klub Mix) — 7:13
2. "Whiggle in Line" (7" Mallard Mix) — 3:36
3. "Migration" (Little Fluffy Ducks Mix) — 4:44
4. "Whiggle in Line" (Daffy Dub) — 4:33
- CD single, UK (1994)
1. "Whiggle in Line" (7" Mallard Mix)
2. "Whiggle in Line" (Peking Krispy Klub Mix)
3. "Whiggle in Line" (Daffy Dub)
4. "Migration" (Little Fluffy Ducks Mix)
- CD single, France (1995)
1. "Whiggle in Line" (7" Mallard Mix) — 3:37
2. "Whiggle in Line" (Daffy Dub) — 4:34

== Charts ==
Chart (1994)	Peak position
Canada Dance/Urban (RPM)	11
Denmark (IFPI)	20
Ireland (IRMA)	26
Scotland (OCC)	39
UK Singles (OCC)	33
UK Dance (OCC)	12
UK Club Chart (Music Week)	79
