= David Park House =

Historic house in Minnesota, United States

- U.S. National Register of Historic Places
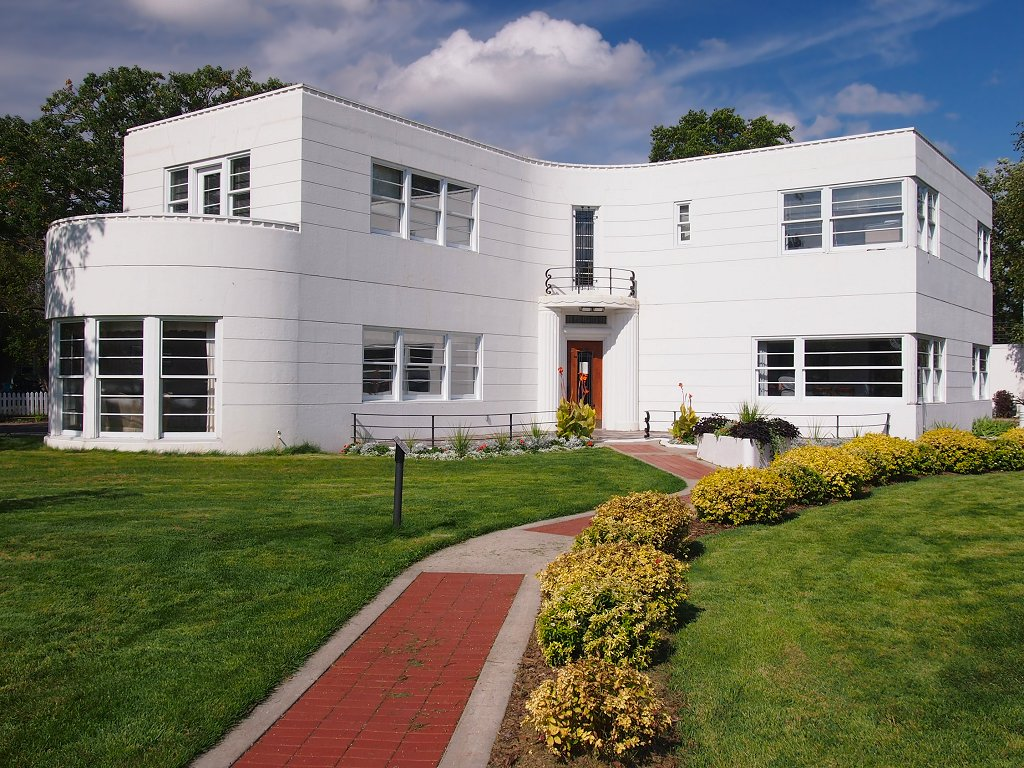
- The David Park House viewed from the southeast

- Location within Minnesota Location within the United States
- Location: 1501 Birchmont Drive, Bemidji, Minnesota
- Coordinates: 47°29′0″N 94°52′33″W
- Area: Less than one acre
- Built: 1936–37
- Built by: Adolph C. Nasvick
- Architect: Edward K. Mahlum
- Architectural style: Streamline Moderne
- NRHP reference No.: 88000566
- Designated: May 16, 1988

The David Park House is a historic house in Bemidji, Minnesota, United States. It was built from 1936 to 1937 in Streamline Moderne style. The house was listed on the National Register of Historic Places in 1988 for its local significance in the theme of architecture. It was nominated for being one of Minnesota's few outstanding examples of residential Streamline Moderne architecture.

Since 1992 the David Park House has served as offices for the Bemidji State University Alumni & Foundation.

== Origin ==
The David Park House was built in 1936‒37 for the Park family by a young unknown architect named Edward Mahlum in an undeveloped neighborhood on the north end of Bemidji. By choice it was in a wooded area across from one of the earliest buildings on the campus of the Bemidji State Teachers College. The neighborhood included Diamond Point Park, which was a rustic camping area, and a popular small zoo. Little else, however, existed in the way of residential development. David Park bought the entire block of land, giving him control over the choice of neighbors.

Park had purchased the Koors Brothers Creamery Company in 1926 and converted it to the David Park Creamery, building it into a highly successful business enterprise. He promised his wife Edna that he would eventually build her a fine home. He attended the 1933 Century of Progress exposition in Chicago, and this exposure to the Art Deco designs featured at the fair likely influenced his choice of Edward K. Mahlum as his architect. He chose a local contractor named Adolph Nasvik to build it. Nasvik was so impressed with the home that he later built a house next door, which some consider complementary to the Park residence.

The home was featured in Larry Millett's book Minnesota's Own: Preserving Our Grand Homes because of its unusual and beautiful design. Viewed from the air, it appears to be in the shape of a piano. The house was built of poured concrete, which was most unusual at a time when most homes in northern Minnesota were built of wood. One of the most remarkable features was a three-story brass railing on the curved staircase. It was necessary to install the railing at an early point in the construction before the house could be closed in around it.

== Use ==
David and Edna Park moved into the house in late 1937. Edna had only a few short years in the house as she died of cancer in 1941. David Park married Wanda Hartman Batchelder in 1944.

The neighborhood children were fascinated with the house. Each Christmas the family allowed one of the Park grandchildren to choose the colors for a gigantic Christmas tree that was placed in the front window. In one year it was a white flocked tree with orange lights; in another it was a purple flocked tree with white lights. Visitors and locals also marveled at one of the home's inhabitants in particular: Megaw, the family's pet monkey.

David Park was proud of his unique home. His daughters Margaret and Mary recalled that he often invited guests to tour the house even though they were already asleep in their rooms. He loved to entertain, and one of his most famous guests was Eleanor Roosevelt. When she visited Bemidji in 1955, Park was shocked to learn that no one had planned a reception for her. As was his custom, he organized an impromptu reception at the house.

Park continued to live in the home until his death in 1977. In 1992, Wanda Park deeded the house to the Bemidji State University Foundation. The building underwent extensive renovations, but workers took care to retain its original interior elements and style. It houses offices of the Foundation and the university's alumni association.

== See also ==
- National Register of Historic Places listings in Beltrami County, Minnesota
