= Debs, Minnesota =

Coordinates: 47°43′53″N 95°07′41″W

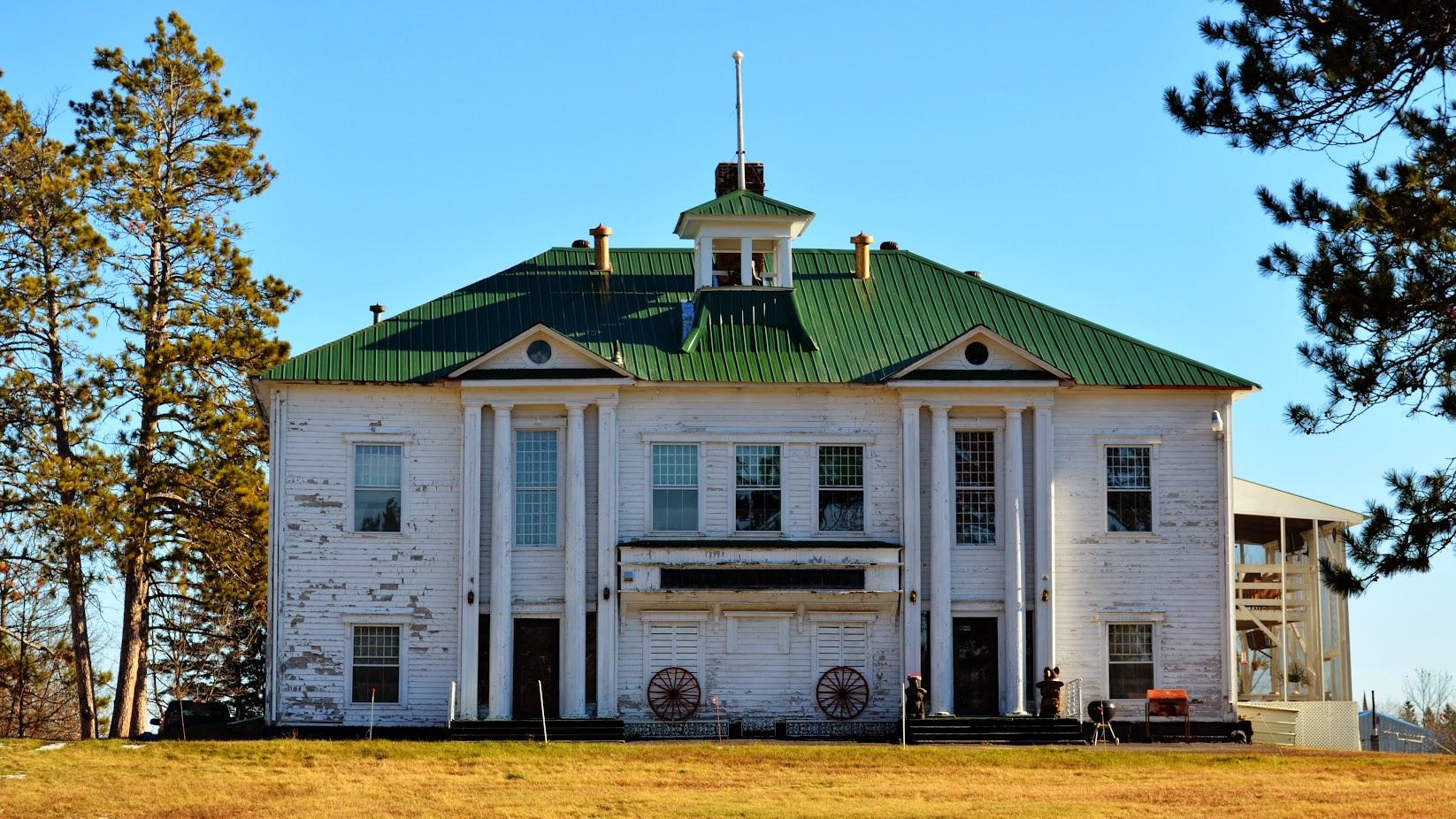
Debs Consolidated School

Debs is a small town in Beltrami County, Minnesota. In 2011 it had an estimated population of three. It is named after Eugene V. Debs, an American labor organizer, socialist leader, and presidential candidate of the Socialist Party of America. Debs Consolidated School noted for its unusual wooden Neoclassical façade is listed on the National Register of Historic Places.
