= Minnesota and International Railway =

Railway line in the United States

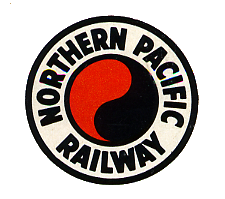

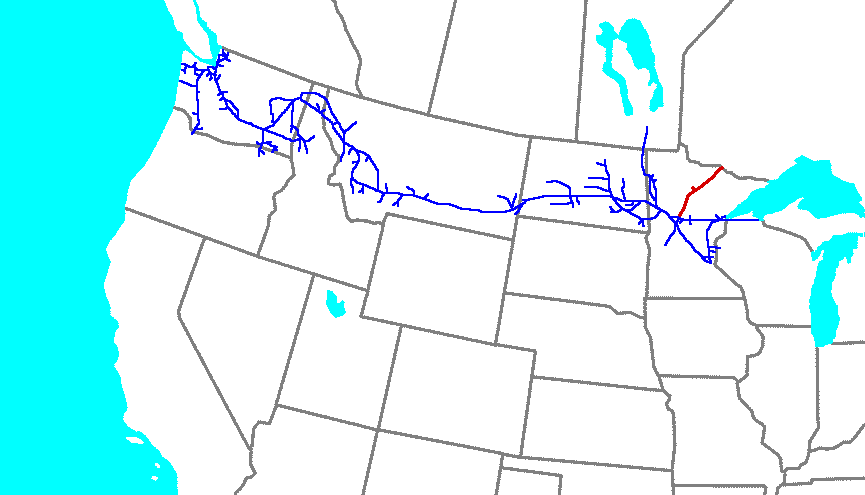
- The Northern Pacific Railway system map showing the Minnesota and International Railway in central Minnesota (in red).

Overview
- Headquarters: Saint Paul, Minnesota
- Reporting mark: NP
- Locale: Minnesota
- Dates of operation: 1900–1941
- Predecessor: Brainerd and Northern
- Successor: Northern Pacific Railway

Technical
- Track gauge: 4 ft 8 1/2 in (1,435 mm) standard gauge

The Minnesota and International Railway was a subsidiary of the Northern Pacific Railway (reporting mark NP), a railway that operated in the western United States along the Canada–United States border. In 1970, the Northern Pacific merged with other lines to form the Burlington Northern Railroad.

== History ==
This road began as a conglomeration of logging lines in north central Minnesota, along with the Northern Pacific's own nascent Brainerd and Northern, begun circa 1892 to build north to the border with Canada.

On July 17, 1900, the Northern Pacific formed the Minnesota and International to control these lines as a through-route between its terminal at Brainerd, Minnesota, and the border with Canada at International Falls, Minnesota. The line formed a 200-mile north–south route via Bemidji, Minnesota. An early 20th century train derailment two miles north of Nisswa Minnesota left multiple box cars sunken in the soil which remain buried today at a depth of approximately 15 feet underneath what is now the Paul Bunyan State Trail.

The corporate entity was folded into its parent company on October 22, 1941, and was operated as the Eighth Sub-division of the Northern Pacific's Lake Superior Division. Division headquarters were in Duluth, Minnesota.

== As the Eighth Sub-division ==
In 1950, the Northern Pacific published a summary of branch line earnings for the system, Form 7251. For the Lake Superior Division, these totals were:

Lake Superior Division

$267,684 Ashland

$834,643 Cuyuna

$3,045,802 Cloquet

$82,035 Grantsburg

$1,380,797 International Falls

$5,610,961 Lake Superior Total

== See also ==
- Minnesota and International Railway Trestle at Blackduck
