= Nore Township, Itasca County, Minnesota =

Nore Township, Minnesota
- Township
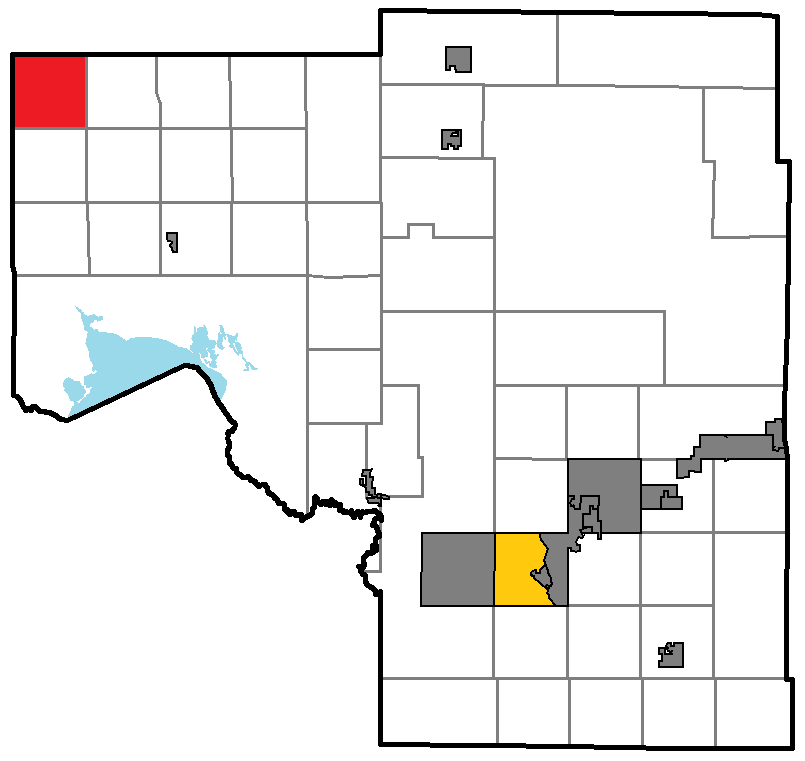
- Location of Nore Township, within Itasca County, Minnesota
- Coordinates: 47°49′40″N 94°22′22″W
- Country: United States
- State: Minnesota
- County: Itasca

Area
  - Total: 36.4 sq mi (94.3 km^{2})
  - Land: 36.3 sq mi (94.0 km^{2})
  - Water: 0.12 sq mi (0.3 km^{2})
- Elevation: 1,440 ft (439 m)

Population (2020)
  - Total: 66
  - Density: 1.8/sq mi (0.70/km^{2})
- Time zone: UTC-6 (Central (CST))
  - Summer (DST): UTC-5 (CDT)
- FIPS code: 27-46582
- GNIS feature ID: 0665136

Nore Township is a township in Itasca County, Minnesota, United States. The population was 66 at the 2020 census.

Nore Township was named for Kittil S. and Syver K. Nohre, Norwegian settlers.

== Geography ==
According to the United States Census Bureau, the township has a total area of 36.4 square miles (94.4 km^{2}), of which 36.3 square miles (94.0 km^{2}) is land and 0.1 square miles (0.3 km^{2}), or 0.36%, is water.

== Demographics ==
As of the census of 2000, there were 55 people, 22 households, and 15 families living in the township. The population density was 1.5 people per square mile (0.6/km^{2}). There were 37 housing units at an average density of 1.0/sq mi (0.4/km^{2}). The racial makeup of the township was 81.82% White and 18.18% Native American.

There were 22 households, out of which 22.7% had children under the age of 18 living with them, 59.1% were married couples living together, 9.1% had a female householder with no husband present, and 27.3% were non-families. 18.2% of all households were made up of individuals, and 9.1% had someone living alone who was 65 years of age or older. The average household size was 2.50 and the average family size was 2.81.

In the township the population was spread out, with 29.1% under the age of 18, 16.4% from 25 to 44, 32.7% from 45 to 64, and 21.8% who were 65 years of age or older. The median age was 48 years. For every 100 females, there were 96.4 males. For every 100 females age 18 and over, there were 95.0 males.

The median income for a household in the township was $28,125, and the median income for a family was $12,344. Males had a median income of $22,500 versus $21,250 for females. The per capita income for the township was $10,398. There were 26.7% of families and 20.0% of the population living below the poverty line, including no under eighteens and 23.5% of those over 64.
