= Blue Ox Trail =

Trail in Minnesota, USA

Coordinates: 48.49109°N 93.48044°W

The Blue Ox Trail, also known as the Voyageurs Trail, runs along a former section of Northern Pacific Railway right-of-way between Bemidji, Minnesota and International Falls, Minnesota. The trail parallels U.S. Route 71.
