= Blackduck, Minnesota =

City in Minnesota, United States

Blackduck
- City
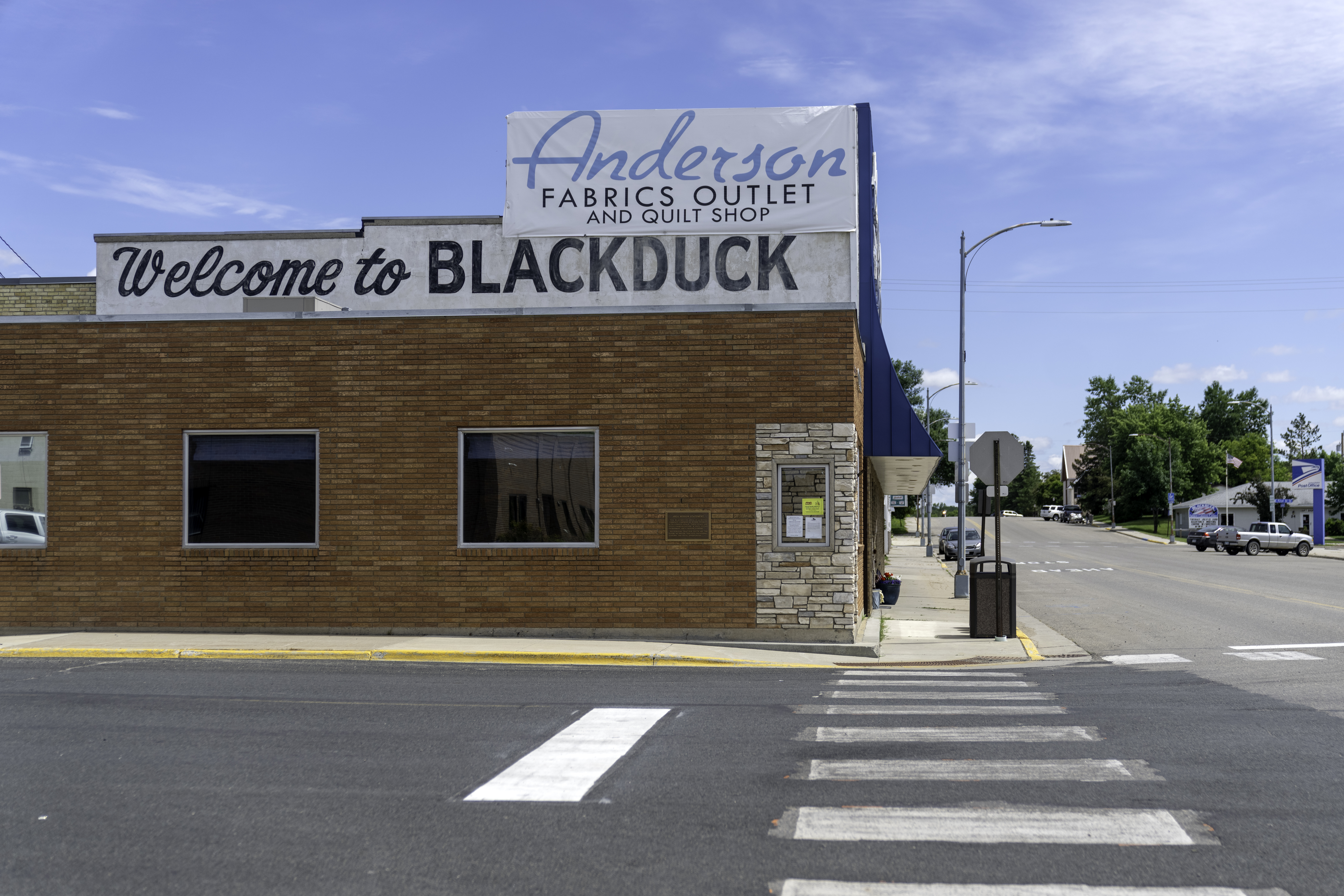
- Downtown Blackduck
- Motto: "A Great Place For Families"
- Location of Blackduck, Minnesota
- Coordinates: 47°43′49″N 94°32′52″W
- Country: United States
- State: Minnesota
- County: Beltrami
- Incorporated (village): October 19, 1900
- Incorporated (city): December 21, 1900

Government
  - Mayor: Max Gulette

Area
  - Total: 1.59 sq mi (4.13 km^{2})
  - Land: 1.55 sq mi (4.02 km^{2})
  - Water: 0.039 sq mi (0.10 km^{2})
- Elevation: 1,398 ft (426 m)

Population (2020)
  - Total: 845
  - Estimate (2023): 814
  - Density: 543.7/sq mi (209.94/km^{2})
- Time zone: UTC-6 (CST)
  - Summer (DST): UTC-5 (CDT)
- ZIP codes: 56630, 56663
- Area code: 218
- FIPS code: 27-06256
- GNIS feature ID: 0655419
- Website: blackduckmn.com

Blackduck is a city in Beltrami County, Minnesota, United States. The population was 845 as of the 2020 census. It is 24 mi (39 km) northeast of Bemidji.

== History ==
The village of Blackduck was organized on October 19, 1900, and the city was incorporated on December 21, 1900. The first settlers came from Crookston, Minnesota. The town was founded because of the area's logging potential. The Laurentian Divide is near the area, and provides good drainage, resulting in good logging because the land is not wet. The community was named for Blackduck Lake.

== Geography ==
According to the United States Census Bureau, the city has an area of 1.71 square miles (4.43 km^{2}), of which 1.67 square miles (4.33 km^{2}) is land and 0.04 square miles (0.10 km^{2}) is water.

=== Climate ===
Climate data for Blackduck, Minnesota, 1991–2020 normals, extremes 1989–2019
| Month | Jan | Feb | Mar | Apr | May | Jun | Jul | Aug | Sep | Oct | Nov | Dec | Year |
|---|---|---|---|---|---|---|---|---|---|---|---|---|---|
| Record high °F (°C) | 52 (11) | 62 (17) | 71 (22) | 88 (31) | 90 (32) | 90 (32) | 95 (35) | 94 (34) | 89 (32) | 85 (29) | 69 (21) | 51 (11) | 95 (35) |
| Mean daily maximum °F (°C) | 18.0 (−7.8) | 23.7 (−4.6) | 36.9 (2.7) | 51.7 (10.9) | 64.7 (18.2) | 73.7 (23.2) | 78.3 (25.7) | 76.8 (24.9) | 67.6 (19.8) | 52.9 (11.6) | 36.4 (2.4) | 23.3 (−4.8) | 50.3 (10.2) |
| Daily mean °F (°C) | 4.7 (−15.2) | 9.6 (−12.4) | 23.2 (−4.9) | 38.1 (3.4) | 51.4 (10.8) | 61.3 (16.3) | 65.9 (18.8) | 63.9 (17.7) | 54.8 (12.7) | 41.7 (5.4) | 26.1 (−3.3) | 12.0 (−11.1) | 37.7 (3.2) |
| Mean daily minimum °F (°C) | −8.7 (−22.6) | −4.5 (−20.3) | 9.5 (−12.5) | 24.6 (−4.1) | 38.1 (3.4) | 48.9 (9.4) | 53.5 (11.9) | 50.9 (10.5) | 42.1 (5.6) | 30.5 (−0.8) | 15.9 (−8.9) | 0.7 (−17.4) | 25.1 (−3.8) |
| Record low °F (°C) | −45 (−43) | −44 (−42) | −35 (−37) | −20 (−29) | 20 (−7) | 30 (−1) | 37 (3) | 27 (−3) | 16 (−9) | 7 (−14) | −28 (−33) | −38 (−39) | −45 (−43) |
| Average precipitation inches (mm) | 0.18 (4.6) | 0.37 (9.4) | 0.65 (17) | 1.16 (29) | 2.91 (74) | 4.30 (109) | 3.26 (83) | 2.80 (71) | 2.84 (72) | 2.69 (68) | 0.78 (20) | 0.31 (7.9) | 22.25 (564.9) |
| Average snowfall inches (cm) | 9.1 (23) | 10.1 (26) | 7.4 (19) | 7.1 (18) | 0.1 (0.25) | 0.0 (0.0) | 0.0 (0.0) | 0.0 (0.0) | 0.0 (0.0) | 1.5 (3.8) | 6.9 (18) | 13.1 (33) | 55.3 (141.05) |
| Average extreme snow depth inches (cm) | 13.9 (35) | 16.1 (41) | 12.8 (33) | 5.3 (13) | 0.1 (0.25) | 0.0 (0.0) | 0.0 (0.0) | 0.0 (0.0) | 0.0 (0.0) | 1.1 (2.8) | 3.7 (9.4) | 11.5 (29) | 19.6 (50) |
| Average precipitation days (≥ 0.01 in) | 1.8 | 1.8 | 2.5 | 3.5 | 7.9 | 9.3 | 7.6 | 6.5 | 6.6 | 5.8 | 3.0 | 1.8 | 58.1 |
| Average snowy days (≥ 0.1 in) | 6.9 | 5.9 | 3.9 | 2.8 | 0.1 | 0.0 | 0.0 | 0.0 | 0.0 | 1.0 | 4.6 | 7.1 | 32.3 |
Source 1: NOAA
Source 2: XMACIS2 (precip/precip days, snow/snow days/snow depth 1990–2019)

== Demographics ==
Historical population
| Census | Pop. | Note | %± |
|---|---|---|---|
| 1910 | 942 | | — |
| 1920 | 788 | | −16.3% |
| 1930 | 704 | | −10.7% |
| 1940 | 753 | | 7.0% |
| 1950 | 732 | | −2.8% |
| 1960 | 765 | | 4.5% |
| 1970 | 595 | | −22.2% |
| 1980 | 653 | | 9.7% |
| 1990 | 718 | | 10.0% |
| 2000 | 696 | | −3.1% |
| 2010 | 785 | | 12.8% |
| 2020 | 845 | | 7.6% |
| 2023 (est.) | 814 | | −3.7% |
U.S. Decennial Census; 2020 Census

=== 2010 census ===
As of the census of 2010, there were 785 people, 338 households, and 185 families living in the city. The population density was 470.1 inhabitants per square mile (181.5/km^{2}). There were 372 housing units at an average density of 222.8 per square mile (86.0/km^{2}). The racial makeup of the city was 89.4% White, 0.4% African American, 4.6% Native American, 0.5% Asian, 0.1% Pacific Islander, 0.8% from other races, and 4.2% from two or more races. Hispanic or Latino of any race were 2.0% of the population.

There were 338 households, of which 32.8% had children under the age of 18 living with them, 33.1% were married couples living together, 16.9% had a female householder with no husband present, 4.7% had a male householder with no wife present, and 45.3% were non-families. 41.1% of all households were made up of individuals, and 22.1% had someone living alone who was 65 years of age or older. The average household size was 2.22 and the average family size was 2.97.

The median age in the city was 37.1 years. 27.1% of residents were under the age of 18; 9.3% were between the ages of 18 and 24; 23.1% were from 25 to 44; 19.6% were from 45 to 64; and 20.9% were 65 years of age or older. The gender makeup of the city was 45.9% male and 54.1% female.

=== 2000 census ===
As of the census of 2000, there were 696 people, 304 households, and 175 families living in the city. The population density was 465.8 inhabitants per square mile (179.8/km^{2}). There were 324 housing units at an average density of 216.8 per square mile (83.7/km^{2}). The racial makeup of the city was 92.10% White, 0.86% African American, 3.45% Native American, 0.14% Asian, 0.14% from other races, and 3.30% from two or more races. Hispanic or Latino of any race were 0.72% of the population.

There were 304 households, out of which 26.0% had children under the age of 18 living with them, 40.1% were married couples living together, 14.5% had a female householder with no husband present, and 42.4% were non-families. 37.8% of all households were made up of individuals, and 19.7% had someone living alone who was 65 years of age or older. The average household size was 2.14 and the average family size was 2.81.

In the city the population was spread out, with 24.6% under the age of 18, 9.1% from 18 to 24, 22.0% from 25 to 44, 15.8% from 45 to 64, and 28.6% who were 65 years of age or older. The median age was 40 years. For every 100 females there were 68.9 males. For every 100 females age 18 and over, there were 64.1 males.

The median income for a household in the city was $21,848, and the median income for a family was $29,750. Males had a median income of $28,594 versus $16,838 for females. The per capita income for the city was $12,536. About 11.6% of families and 16.9% of the population were below the poverty line, including 18.5% of those under age 18 and 15.8% of those age 65 or over.

== Parks and recreation ==
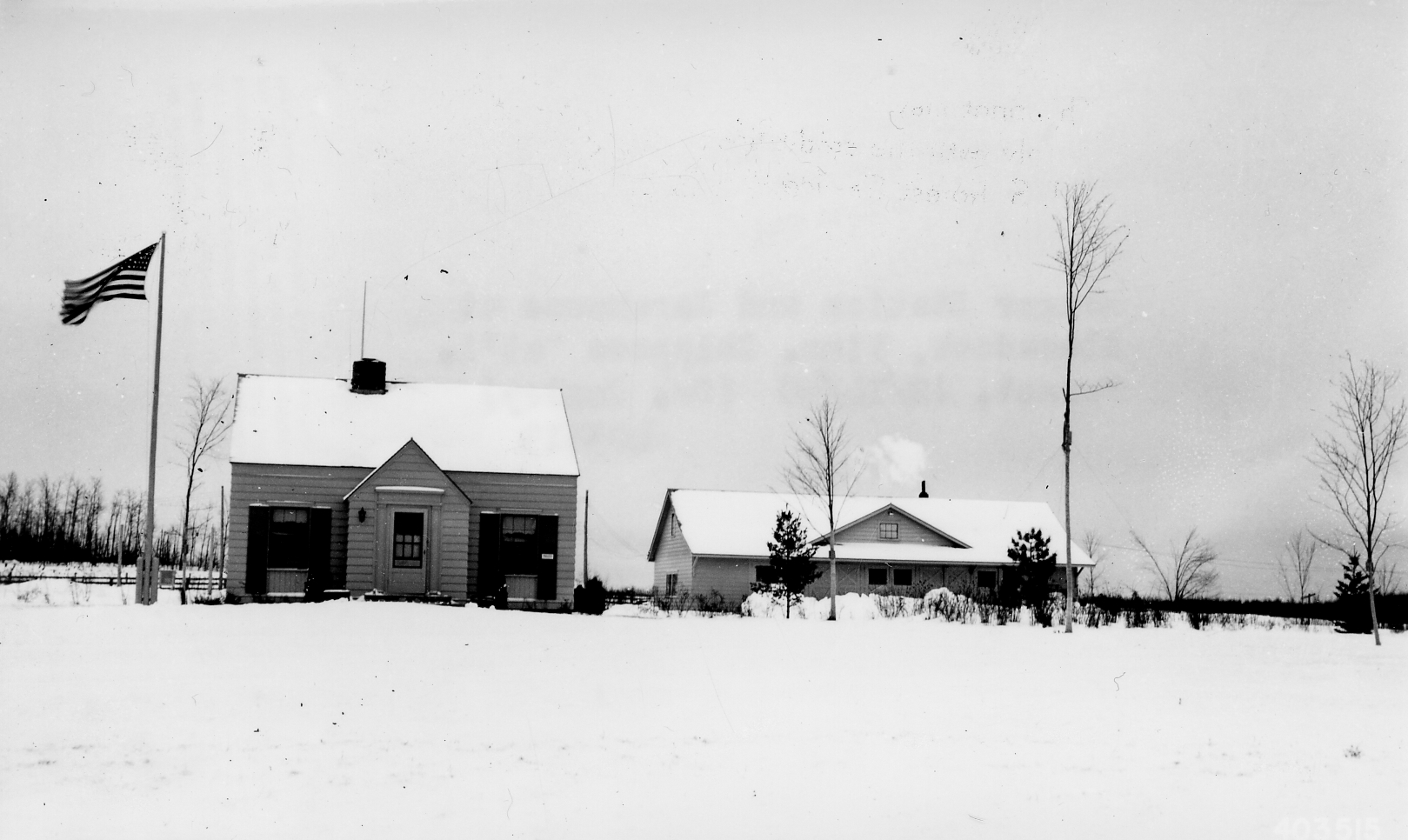
Ranger Station and Warehouse at Blackduck, 1940

The Blue Ox Trail goes through Blackduck for use by hikers and snowmobilers. The old rail line includes the Minnesota and International Railway Bridge, which is on the National Register of Historic Places.

== Education ==
Blackduck has one public school, which houses Blackduck Elementary School and Blackduck High School.

== Media ==
=== Newspaper ===
- The Blackduck American

=== FM radio stations ===
- 92.1 WMIS-FM
- 98.3 WBJI
- 104.5 KBUN-FM

== Gallery ==
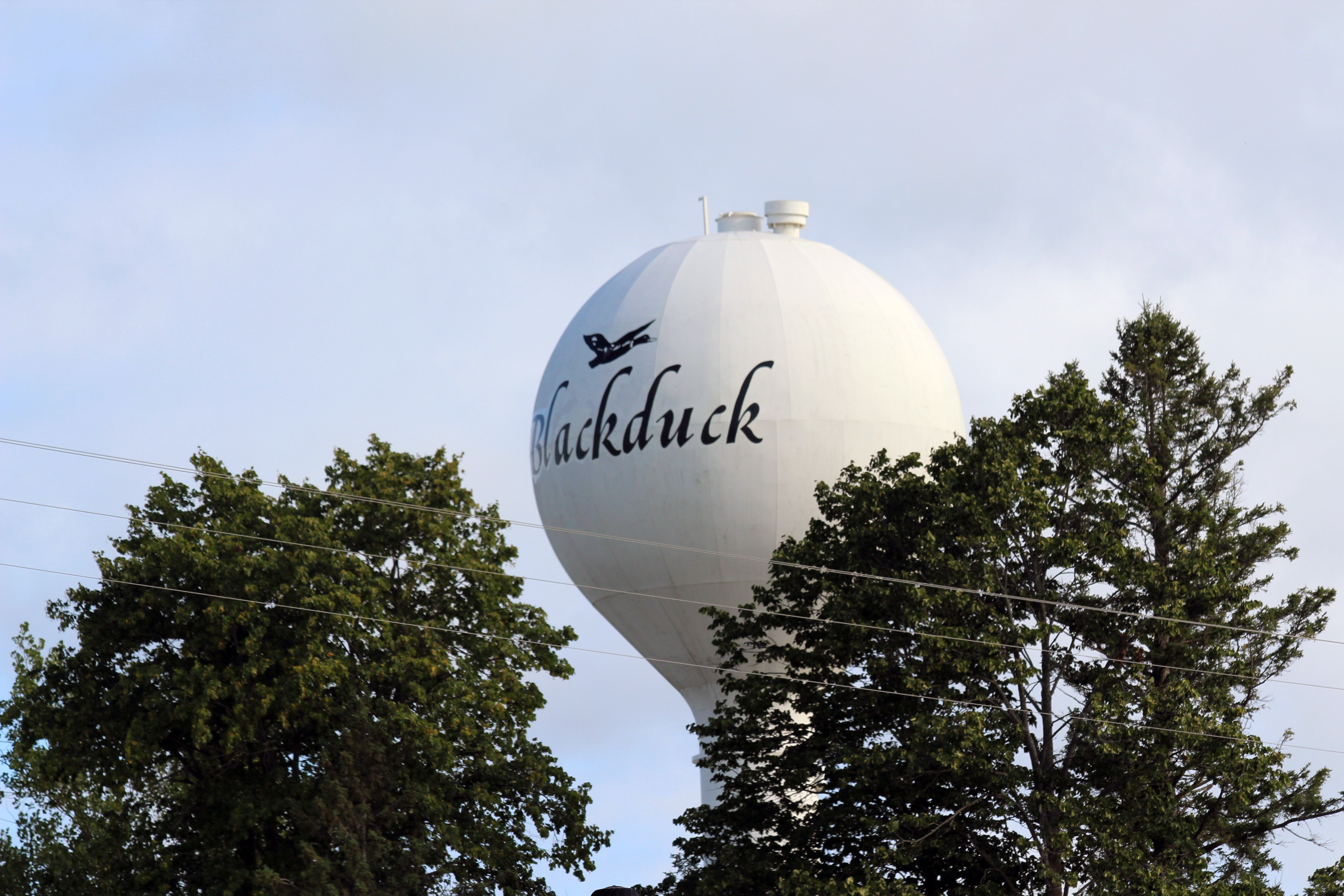
Water tower

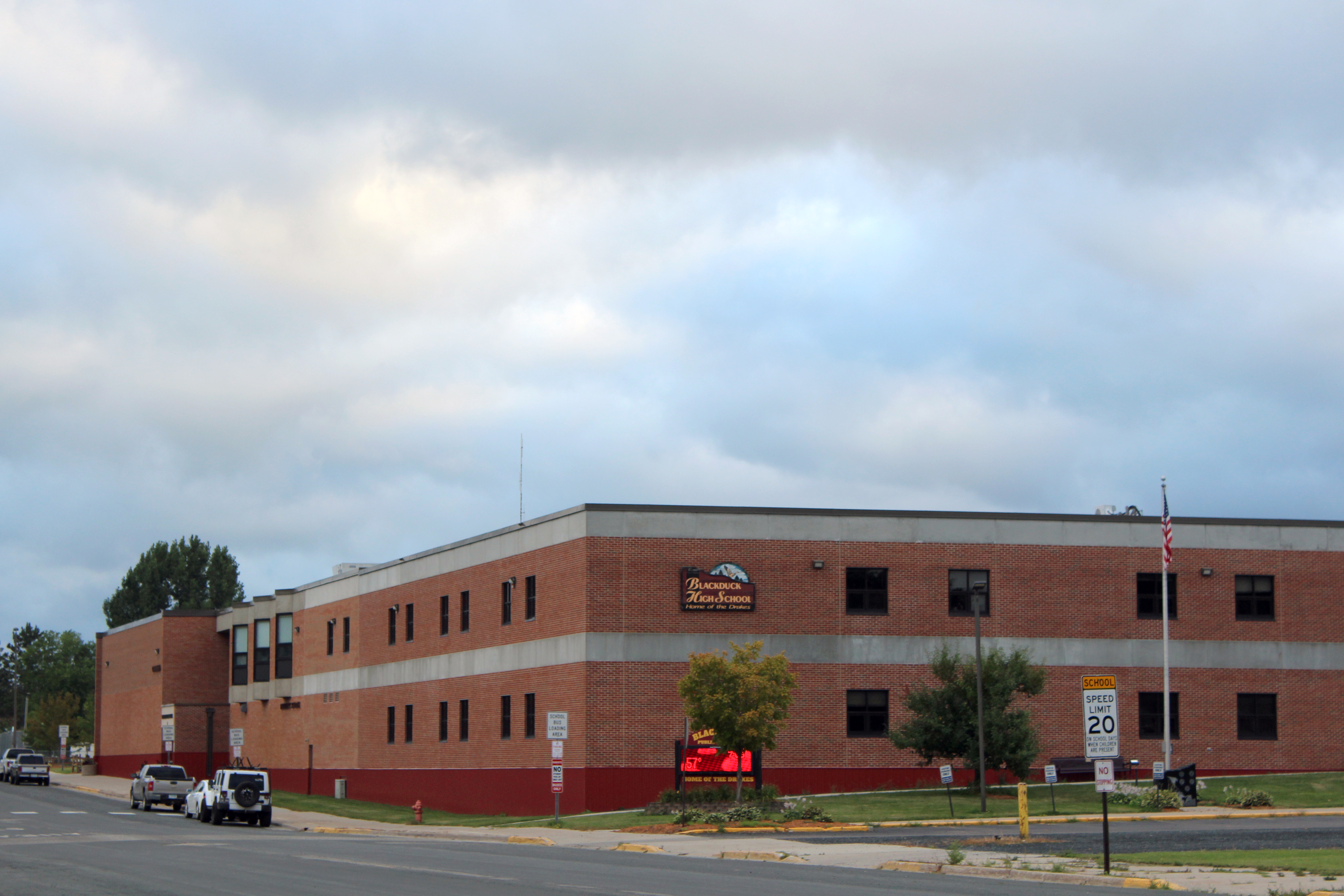
Blackduck High School

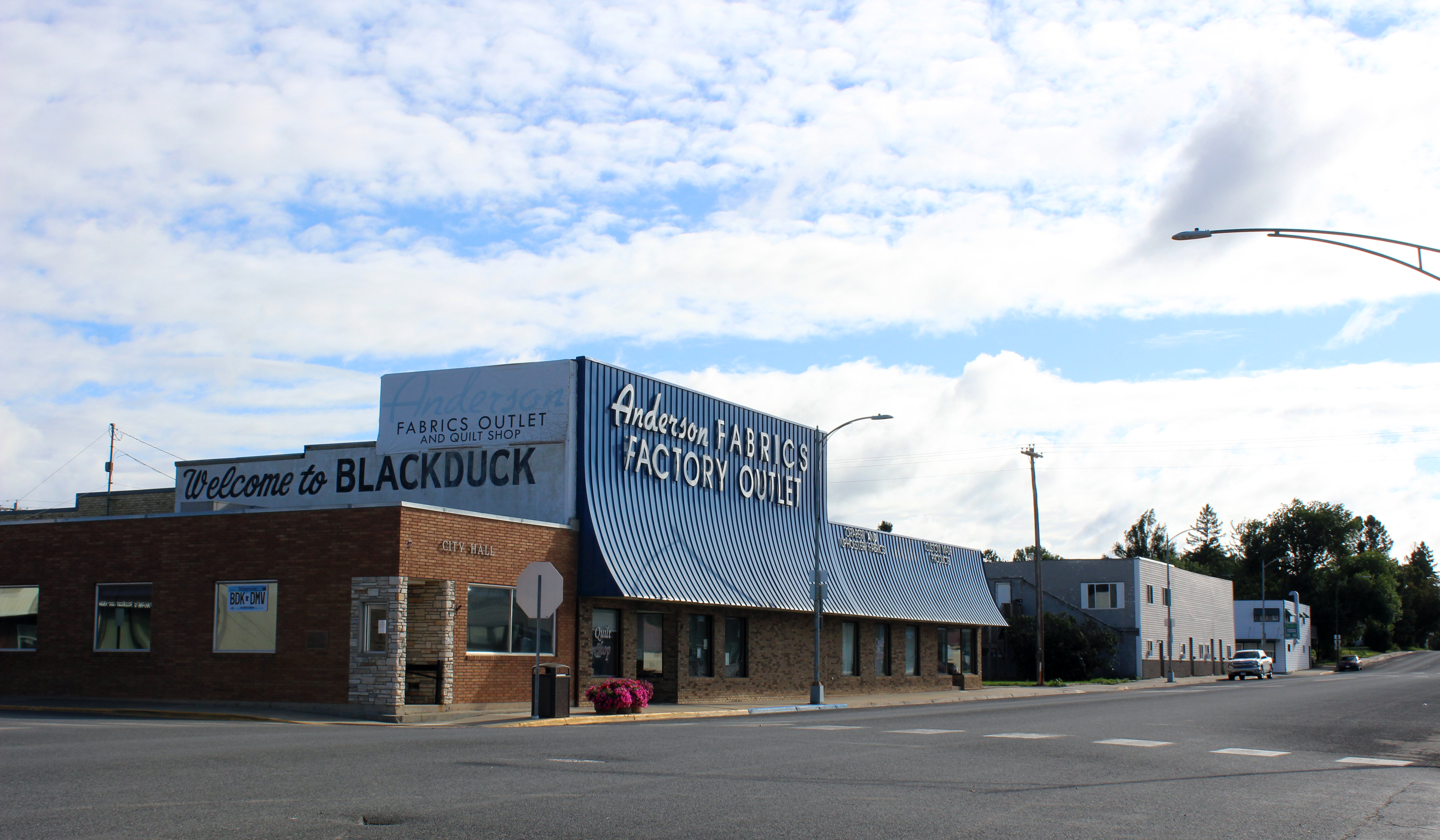
Businesses on Summit Avenue

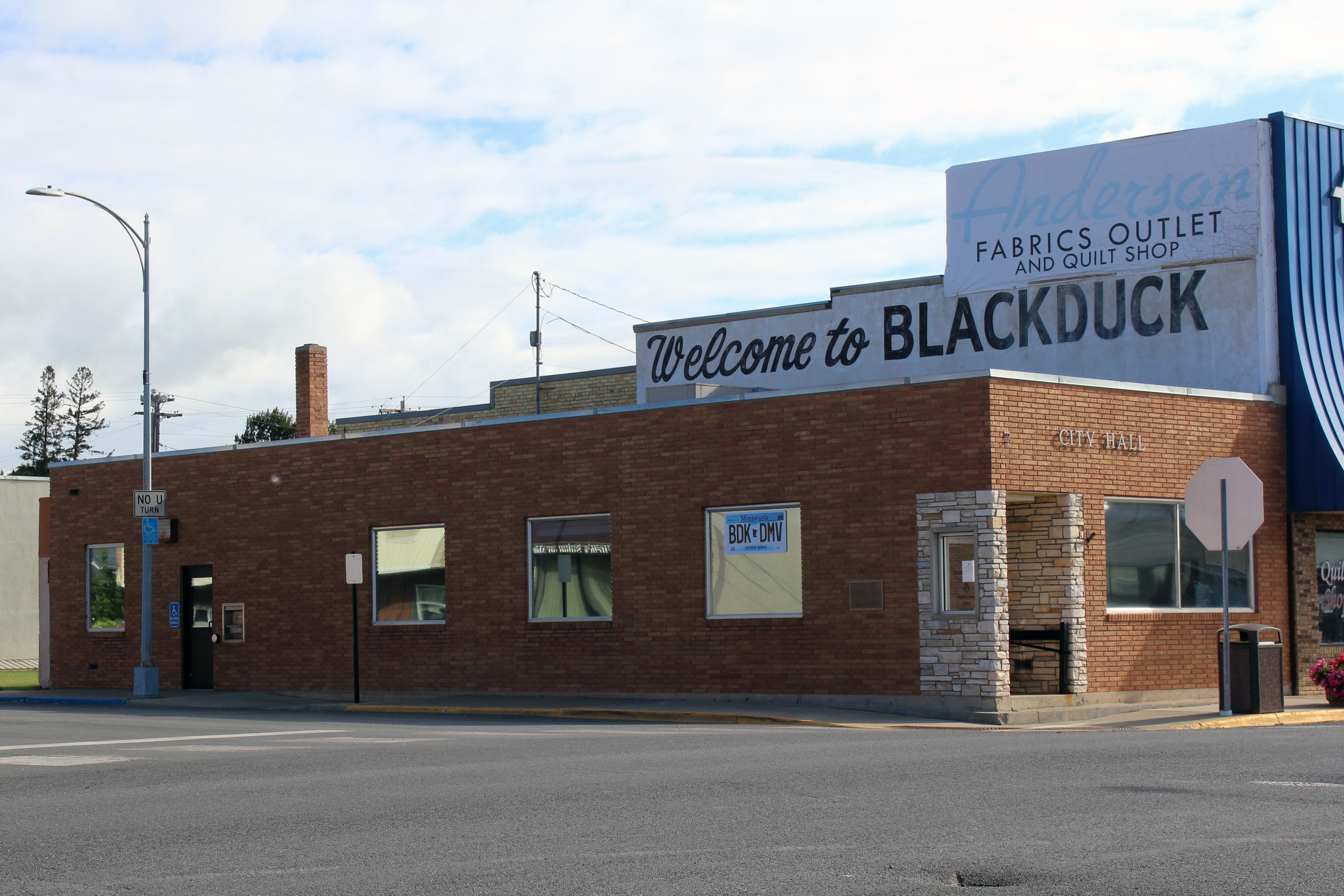
City Hall

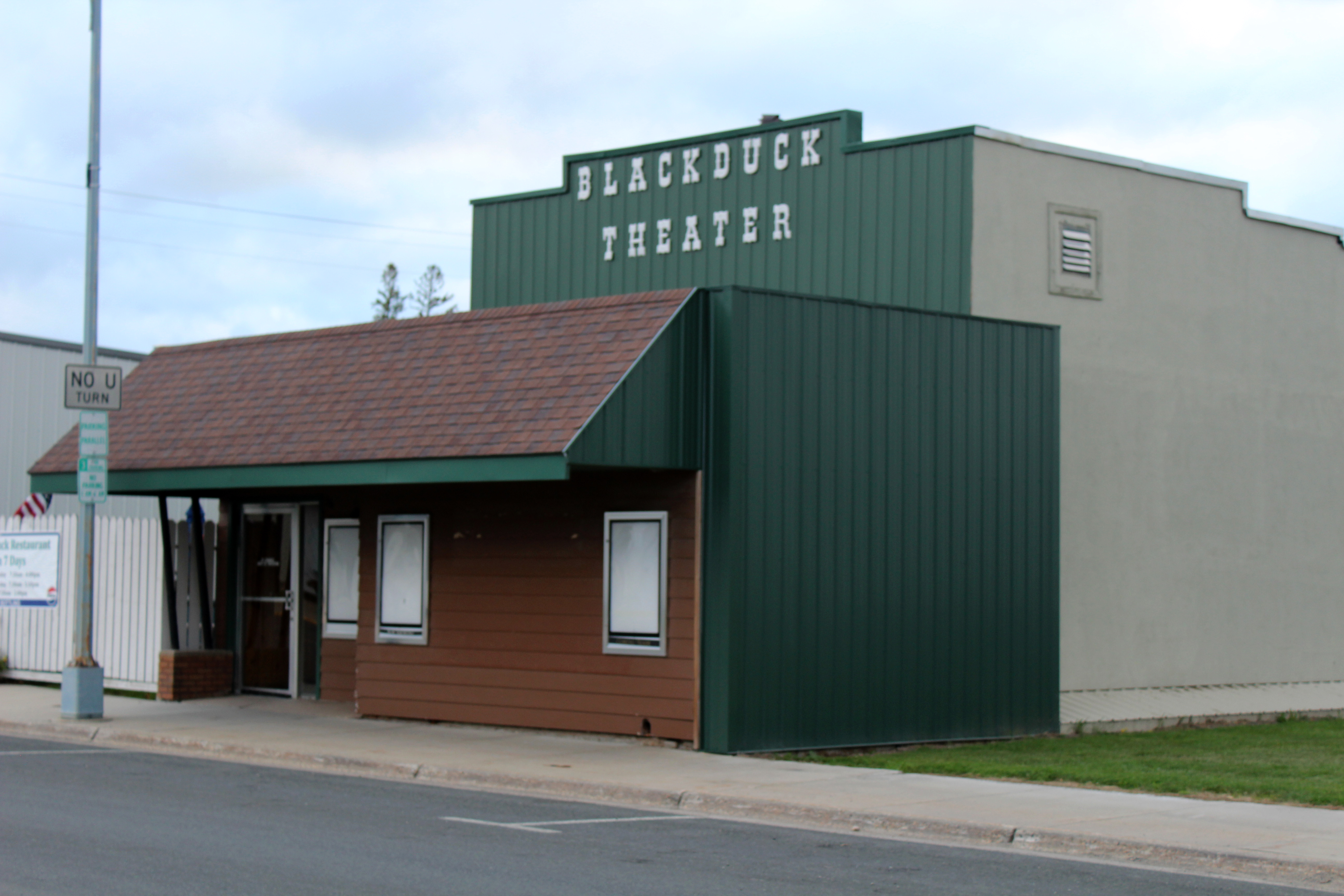
Blackduck Theater
