= Eden, Mississippi =

- Village
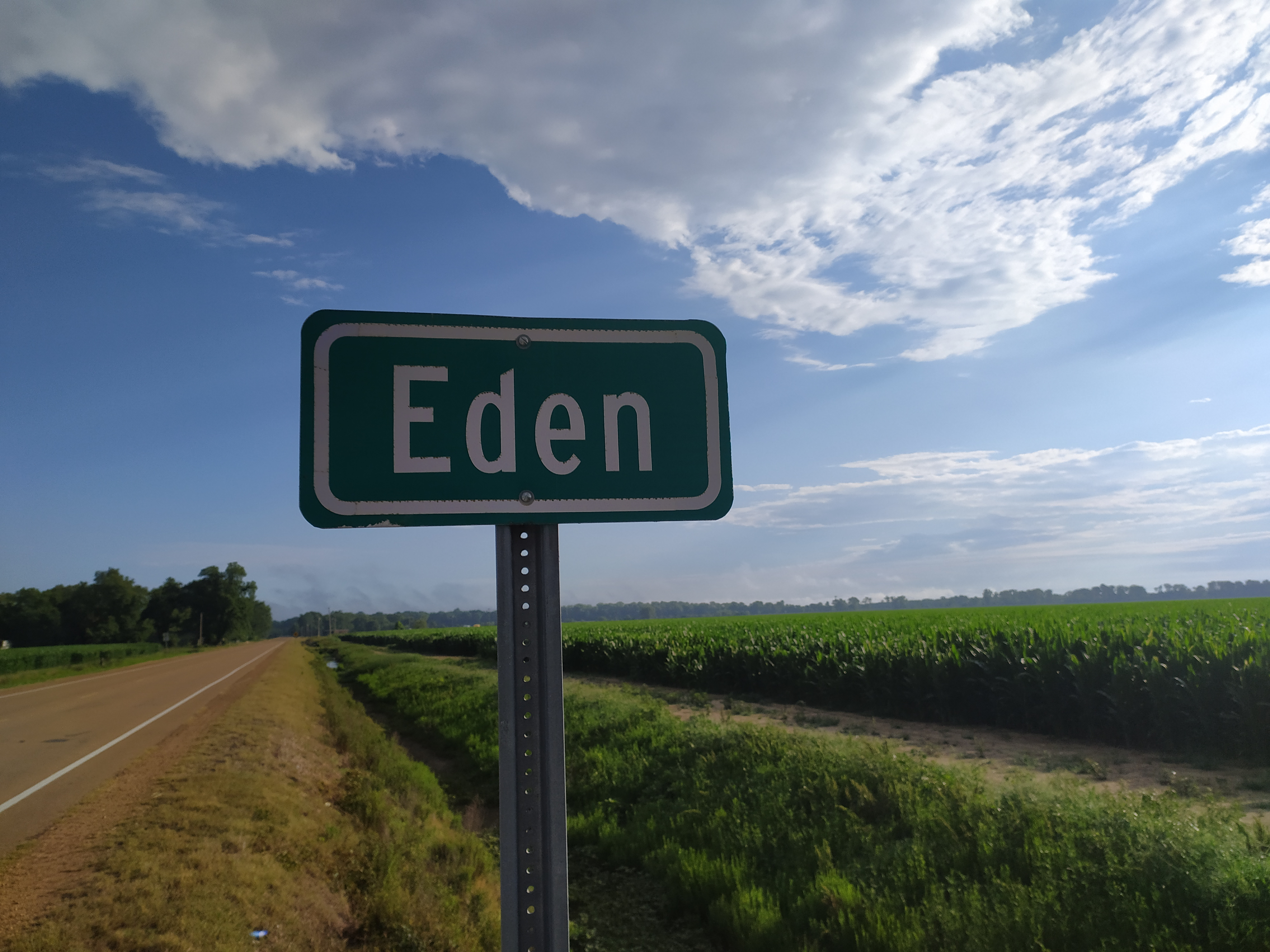
- Highway sign outside of Eden

- Location of Eden, Mississippi

- Location in the United States
- Coordinates: 32°59′01″N 90°19′26″W
- Country: United States
- State: Mississippi
- County: Yazoo

Area
  - Total: 0.47 sq mi (1.23 km^{2})
  - Land: 0.47 sq mi (1.23 km^{2})
  - Water: 0 sq mi (0.00 km^{2})
- Elevation: 112 ft (34 m)

Population (2020)
  - Total: 133
  - Density: 281.1/sq mi (108.55/km^{2})
- Time zone: UTC-6 (Central (CST))
  - Summer (DST): UTC-5 (CDT)
- FIPS code: 28-21420
- GNIS feature ID: 2407447

Eden is a village in Yazoo County, Mississippi, United States. Per the 2020 Census, the population was 133.

== History ==
The Village of Eden was incorporated by act of the Mississippi Legislature on February 24, 1890. The town’s political boundaries as originally drawn were centered around Eden Station, a depot of the Yazoo & Mississippi Valley Railroad (Y&MV) established in the mid-1880’s and from which the community derived its name. According to one prevalent legend, the negotiation of the north-south rail right-of-way across the expansive Ingersoll Estate had been accomplished so easily that railroad officials concluded that they must have found the paradise of Eden. (Note: This happy sentiment was not shared by one early traveler on the Y&MVRR who considered the town’s backwater surrounds more akin to the swampy Eden of Charles Dickens’s mid-19th century novel Martin Chuzzlewit.)

The earliest patent holder of the parcels of land that would comprise the village of Eden was Alfred Fowler who acquired those properties in 1835 along with substantial other land holdings in Yazoo, Holmes, and Leflore Counties. Beginning in the late-1840s, several of Fowler’s Yazoo County properties along with those of other nearby patent-holders were acquired by John Ingersoll (1811-1859) (Note: John Ingersoll was born in Philadelphia, was the fourth son of prominent Pennsylvania politician Charles Jared Ingersoll (1782-1862), and in the 1830s had established himself in a general commission business in New Orleans and Natchez as cotton broker and merchant. Upon Ingersoll’s untimely death, Ingelside plantation passed into the hands of his widow, adult son, and minor children.) and assembled into a slave plantation, referred to as Ingleside, consisting of approximately 2000 acres with large portions under cotton cultivation. (Note: The U.S. Census of 1860 noted the value of Ingersoll-owned real estate as $90,000 and that of personal estate, by which was meant slave holdings, as $110,000. The slave schedule of the 1860 census details the Ingersoll estate holdings of 94 enslaved persons, unnamed, including 40 males and 54 females ranging in ages from 1 to 58 years.)

The transformation of Ingleside plantation into the village of Eden was propelled by the establishment by Y&MV Railroad of Eden Station along with regular freight and passenger train service between the state capitol at Jackson, Greenwood to the north, and points both between and beyond. (Note: According to published schedules, rail travel between Eden and Yazoo City, the county seat, a distance of eleven miles, could be completed in 34 minutes, a great improvement in terms of both time and effort required by travel on steam-powered packet boat on the nearby Yazoo River or overland via horse-and-wagon through the winding and rolling hills.) The rail line further facilitated the establishment of a post office at Eden in 1887 and supported the development of a thriving lumber industry in the town including saw mills and stave and crosstie factories.

By the early 1900s, Eden had a booming mercantile business of nine general stores, two hotels, two druggists, two medical doctors, a school house, and a multi-denominational church. An artesian well completed in Eden 1906 was considered adequate to supply a population of 2,000 to 3,000 persons. Expanding the productive capacities of steam-powered gins and mills of the plantation era, the farmers of the area were able to export to market train-car loads of cotton bales, corn, peanuts, hay, peas, cattle, and hogs.

The lumber extraction industry which fueled Eden’s post-Civil War economy had two significant effects. First, the clear cutting of timber in the area, while increasing the acreage available for the cultivation of cotton, led inevitably to the waning of the local lumber industry as timber supplies were exhausted. Second, the arable land reclaimed from the lowland hardwood forests experienced an increased susceptibility to periodic backwater flooding with the resulting ruination of crops. Flood control efforts extended over decades since the 1920s and included a major diversion of Tesheva Creek from the south of the village to the east, connecting it with Parker Bayou and the Yazoo River to the north; the construction of levees along the Yazoo River and the relocated Tesheva creek; and the excavation of a network of drainage channels both north and south of the village. Despite these efforts, portions of the low-lying lands within the village limits are subject to periodic flooding.

Social and economic change in Eden was hastened by innovations in both communication and transportation. Telegraph lines were constructed in the 1880s accompanying establishment of the railroad, and telephone lines connecting to Eden were built in the 1890s. Automobile travel between Eden and Yazoo City was facilitated by the construction in the 1920s of US Route 49E, an improved gravel road paralleling the railroad right-of-way thus bypassing the circuitous and hilly passage through the hills. Electrical power service to Eden was established in the 1930s.

Over the decades, newspaper articles from Yazoo City and nearby Lexington in Holmes County regularly reported on local news from the village of Eden, and they chronicle, often in minute detail, the social life of the community. Regular correspondents’ columns give accounts of the comings and goings of the citizenry, worship services of the Baptist and Methodist churches, convening of women’s clubs in members’ homes, the hosting of county-wide Sunday School conventions, regular programs of the Eden school, horse races and political rallies with estimated attendance as high as 2,000. (Note: The early accounts, printed during the post-Reconstruction Jim Crow era of racial segregation, focus almost exclusively upon the fine grain of white society and offer sparse insights into the texture of African American community life with which it was both inter-twined and separate.)

The population of Eden peaked in 1950 and then began its steady decline as jobs and commerce flowed out of the town rather than into it. Most of the original commercial and residential structures were demolished or fell into disrepair. In their place, a combination of manufactured homes and compact slab-on-grade tract houses now populate a verdant but mostly flat and unfenced landscape. The primary civic structures in the village include the modest pre-fabricated city hall, the abandoned but intact post office, the vernacular Morning Star Missionary Baptist Church, and the more imposing Eden Baptist Church, expanded and modernized in the 1970s by architect John E. DeCell.

The village is organized with a mayor and board of aldermen form of government and includes the position of municipal clerk. The first mayor elected soon after incorporation in 1890 was Mathew Beale (1836-1910). The first female mayor was Hattie Lee Woods VanCleave (1894-1981) who succeeded to the office upon the death of her husband in 1947. Lakisha Thomas Hogan, elected in 2013, became Eden’s first mayor of African descent.

== Geography ==
According to the United States Census Bureau, the village has a total area of 0.5 square miles (1.3 km^{2}), all land.

The geographic extents of Eden lie within the ancestral territories of the Chahta (Choctaw) people, lands ceded to the United States in the Treaty of Doak’s Stand (1820) following the creation of the State of Mississippi in 1817. Land surveys facilitating the subdivision and sale of public lands of the Choctaw Cession commenced in 1821 with the establishment of the Choctaw Meridian. Eden resides within Township 13-North 1-West which is bounded on the east by that north-south datum line.

The original survey of the township was completed in 1826 and the first land sales recorded in 1827. The surveyors’ map and field notes from that period distinguish between the lowland swamp of the Yazoo River backwater to the west and the loess bluffs that rise precipitously to the east and define the upland edge of the vast Yazoo-Mississippi Delta. Other prominent features noted in Sections 8 and 17 of the township survey, Eden’s future location, include a large cane prairie within the bottomland hardwood forest, a cypress pond, the branching southwesterly course of Tesheva Creek, and a network of human paths and animal trails descending from the high ground to the alluvial plain, crisscrossing the creek and traversing the open prairie. Surveys from 1975 note the predominance within Eden of soils of Morganfield-Adler association, described as "nearly level, well-drained and moderately well-drained, loamy soils that are high in silt; on flood plains." Both north and south of the inhabited zones flanking the streets, backyards abut agricultural fields which are in turn bounded on the south by the highway and the hills and then to the north by the swampy bayous and backwaters comprising the Theodore Roosevelt National Wildlife Refuge and the Hillside National Wildlife Refuge.

The primary street in the village is Eden Main Street, one-half mile in length, an east-west extension of Eden Midway Road which intersects with U.S. Route 49E just east of the village limits. At its western extents, Eden Main Street branches. It continues westerly and crosses the Canadian National rail line to form Money Sunk Road which extends two miles to the Yazoo River; and it turns southerly to form Eden Lane to intersect again with U.S. Route 49E in about one mile. Eden Main Street runs approximately 500 feet north of and parallel to the course followed by Tesheva Creek prior to its diversion north of town. (Note: Reminiscences of a citizen that the creek and the street once ran in the same course cannot be verified from either the evidence of the original 1827 survey or from a Yazoo County property map from 1874.) A minor north-south street, Church Street, intersects at the midpoint of Eden Main Street and terminates at an agricultural field. Property subdivisions within the village limits are generally oriented perpendicular to the thoroughfares, with some geometric irregularity. Residential lots vary in size from one-half to two acres while some agricultural fields contain as many as 30 acres.

== Demographics ==
Historical population
| Census | Pop. | Note | %± |
|---|---|---|---|
| 1910 | 176 | | — |
| 1920 | 221 | | 25.6% |
| 1930 | 233 | | 5.4% |
| 1940 | 292 | | 25.3% |
| 1950 | 306 | | 4.8% |
| 1960 | 218 | | −28.8% |
| 1970 | 152 | | −30.3% |
| 1980 | 150 | | −1.3% |
| 1990 | 88 | | −41.3% |
| 2000 | 126 | | 43.2% |
| 2010 | 103 | | −18.3% |
| 2020 | 133 | | 29.1% |
U.S. Decennial Census; 2010 2020

=== 2020 census ===
Eden village, Mississippi – Demographic Profile (NH = Non-Hispanic)
| Race / Ethnicity | Pop 2010 | Pop 2020 | % 2010 | % 2020 |
|---|---|---|---|---|
| White alone (NH) | 48 | 51 | 46.60% | 38.35% |
| Black or African American alone (NH) | 45 | 74 | 43.69% | 55.64% |
| Native American or Alaska Native alone (NH) | 0 | 0 | 0.00% | 0.00% |
| Asian alone (NH) | 0 | 0 | 0.00% | 0.00% |
| Pacific Islander alone (NH) | 0 | 0 | 0.00% | 0.00% |
| Some Other Race alone (NH) | 0 | 0 | 0.00% | 0.00% |
| Mixed Race/Multi-Racial (NH) | 1 | 1 | 0.97% | 0.75% |
| Hispanic or Latino (any race) | 9 | 7 | 8.74% | 5.26% |
| Total | 103 | 133 | 100.00% | 100.00% |

Note: the US Census treats Hispanic/Latino as an ethnic category. This table excludes Latinos from the racial categories and assigns them to a separate category. Hispanics/Latinos can be of any race.

=== 2000 Census ===
As of the census of 2000, there were 126 people, 47 households, and 33 families residing in the village. The population density was 260.3 inhabitants per square mile (100.5/km^{2}). There were 59 housing units at an average density of 121.9 per square mile (47.1/km^{2}). The racial makeup of the village was 57.94% White and 42.06% African American.

There were 47 households, out of which 40.4% had children under the age of 18 living with them, 40.4% were married couples living together, 23.4% had a female householder with no husband present, and 27.7% were non-families. 27.7% of all households were made up of individuals, and 8.5% had someone living alone who was 65 years of age or older. The average household size was 2.68 and the average family size was 3.26.

In the village, the population was spread out, with 29.4% under the age of 18, 9.5% from 18 to 24, 27.8% from 25 to 44, 19.0% from 45 to 64, and 14.3% who were 65 years of age or older. The median age was 33 years. For every 100 females, there were 96.9 males. For every 100 females age 18 and over, there were 85.4 males.

The median income for a household in the village was $24,286, and the median income for a family was $24,375. Males had a median income of $40,625 versus $11,750 for females. The per capita income for the village was $16,675. There were 30.6% of families and 35.7% of the population living below the poverty line, including 44.4% of under eighteens and 11.1% of those over 64.

== Education ==
The Village of Eden is served by the Yazoo County School District. Residents are zoned to Yazoo County Middle School and Yazoo County High School.

== Infrastructure ==
=== Transportation ===
Amtrak’s City of New Orleans, which operates between New Orleans and Chicago, passes through the town on Canadian National Railway tracks, but makes no stop. The nearest station is Yazoo City station, 11 miles (18 km) south.

=== Public safety ===
The village and surrounding areas near the village are protected by the Eden Volunteer Fire Department. The department is composed of a fire chief and approximately 15 volunteer firefighters. Apparatus included an engine truck, a brush truck, and a tanker truck. The village receives mutual aid from District 3 Volunteer Fire Department near Yazoo City. The department provides emergency medical care as a first responder unit along with Pafford Ambulance, a contracted EMS provider for the county.

Law Enforcement is provided by the Yazoo County Sheriffs Office.

== Notable people ==
- James "Son" Thomas, blues musician, gravedigger and sculptor.
