= North American Wetlands Conservation Act =

United States federal environmental law (enacted 1989)

The North American Wetlands Conservation Act signed into law by President George H. W. Bush on December 13, 1989 authorizes a wetlands habitat program, administered by the United States Fish and Wildlife Service, which provides grants to protect and manage wetland habitats for migratory birds and other wetland wildlife in the United States, Mexico, and Canada. A nine-member council meets periodically to decide which projects to fund.

The program encourages private-public cost-sharing projects. It must allocate between 50% and 70% of all funds to projects in Mexico and Canada, and no more than 50% of the U.S. share for projects in these countries can come from federal sources. The Act was recently reauthorized through FY2007 in P.L. 107-308, which gradually increases the funding level to $75 million in the final year.

== Results ==
The Wetlands Conservation Act has provided North America with different and effective ways to preserve wetlands to ensure that wildlife and migratory birds’ habitats are safe. More than 2,000 projects have been started, collaborating with 3,000 other organizations. These collaborations include private and public landowners and over 25 million acres in the United States. Over $411 million in federal appropriations have been leveraged into $3.5 billion which creates jobs through NAWCA, and these jobs have accumulated $200 million in worker's earnings annually.

=== Conservation issue ===
Plants and soils in wetlands have a very active and significant role in the environment because they filter water by removing high levels of nitrogen and phosphorus. They also remove toxic chemicals before they have the opportunity to enter the groundwater. When the wetlands' plants and soils are intact, many harmful toxins are shut out, and the entire habitat can be a safer place for migratory birds and other species to reside. NAWCA not only benefits wildlife and migratory birds, but also benefits other visitors. When wetlands have an abundance of wildlife, humans can enjoy fishing, hunting, and nature as well.

== NAWCA in Multiple States ==
=== Louisiana ===
Louisiana currently has 47 NAWCA projects which has covered an amount of 519,038 acres of wildlife habitat and NAWCA has 19 multi-state projects completed in Louisiana which has conserved 314,887 acres of wildlife habitat. It is said that Louisiana has the highest rate of coastal wetlands in North America; Louisiana also has the most moss loss. Louisiana loses 16,000-22,000 acres a year and nearly 1,500 square miles of marsh has been lost over a total of seven years.

- Black Lake Terracing Project

The Black Lake Terracing Project is led by Ducks Unlimited and includes 16 partnerships from other states, federal, nonprofit, and private partners. This project has restored marshes in many areas including areas west of Hackberry, Louisiana near Black Lake and areas on the Cameron Prairie National Wildlife Refuge. Black Lake Terracing Project focuses on areas that contain migration and wintering habitats for scaup, mottled duck, northern pintails, and mallards. The habitats and livelihood of shorebirds, wading birds, and other water-birds are also species that are a major importance in this project.

=== Mississippi ===
- Theodore Roosevelt National Wildlife Refuge Complex

This Mississippi project has protected over 675 acres of wetland in areas including Morgan Brake National Wildlife Refuge and Panther Swamp National Wildlife Refuge. NAWCA projects in Mississippi have provided protection to more than 675 acres of wetland habitats on the Morgan Brake National Wildlife Refuge and Panther Swamp National Wildlife Refuge. In Morgan Brake's wildlife, NAWCA has converted empty crawfish ponds to moist soil units. In order to convert the ponds to soil units, wells and underground irrigation must be improved along with redesigning levees that are in the area.

The work on Panther Swamp has enhanced waterfowl habitat in the Lower Twist and Big Twist areas. By enhancing levees and building new and better ones will allow refuge staff to better control flooding of moist soil plants and agricultural crops for waterfowl. In 2009, Panther Swamp opened 800 acres that were previously off limits to allow humans to regain hunting privileges in that area.

Theodore Roosevelt National Wildlife Refuge Complex has partnered with many organizations including Ducks Unlimited, Wetlands America Trust, Environmental Synergy, the Walker Foundation, and the U.S. Fish and Wildlife Service.

=== Arkansas ===
- Bayou Meto Basin Phase I

NAWCA is working on 14 projects in the Arkansas area, and over 67,414 acres of land has been conserved. $8.7 million has been contributed to these projects and partner contributions have totaled an amount of $33.5 million. Arkansas has 12 multi-state projects underway, and the 294,710 acres covered are in the best condition than they have ever been.

Halowell reservoir, located in Arkansas County and constructed in the 1950s, was originally a reservoir for public hunting. From 1960-76, the property was managed as a fishery site and in the late 1960s, the reservoir was flooded. The site was later drained to enhance water control and build levees.

Recently, the site has been turned into a waterfowl rest area, but there has been failed attempts to provide a quality habitat. Small trees, broomsedges, and asters have invaded the site and have made it hard for waterfowls to enjoy the environment.

== Similar legislation ==
The North American Wetlands Conservation Act had such a positive impact on the wetlands that in 1990, a similar act was written for wetlands and upland habitats. The program is titled The Standard Grants Program, which is a competitive, matching grants program that supports Canada, Mexico, and the United States with private and public wetland projects. These wetland projects that are carried out must be long-term protection, restoration, and/or enhancement of wetlands. Projects carried out in Mexico may also include technical training, education on environmental control and protection, and organizational development.

The other program that was created was The Small Grants Program of 1996. This program is the same as The Standard Grants Program, but project activities are usually smaller in scope and do not require as much funds as The Standard Grants Program; grant request must not exceed $75,000.
