= Hatchie (disambiguation) =

Hatchie (born 1993) is an Australian pop musician.

Hatchie may also refer to:

- Hatchie River, a river in northern Mississippi and southwestern Tennessee
- Hatchie National Wildlife Refuge, a wildlife refuge consisting of a portion of the floodplain of the Hatchie River in West Tennessee
