= List of ecoregions in Louisiana =

Level III USEPA ecoregions in Louisiana

The list of ecoregions in Louisiana are listings of terrestrial ecoregions (see also, ecosystem) in the United States' State of Louisiana, as defined separately by the United States Environmental Protection Agency (USEPA), and the World Wildlife Fund. Louisiana's ecology is in a land area of 51,840 square miles (134,264 km^{2}); the state is 379 miles (610 km) long and 130 miles (231 km) wide and is located between latitude: 28° 56′ N to 33° 01′ N, and longitude: 88° 49′ W to 94° 03′ W, with a humid subtropical climate (Köppen climate classification Cfa).

== USEPA ==
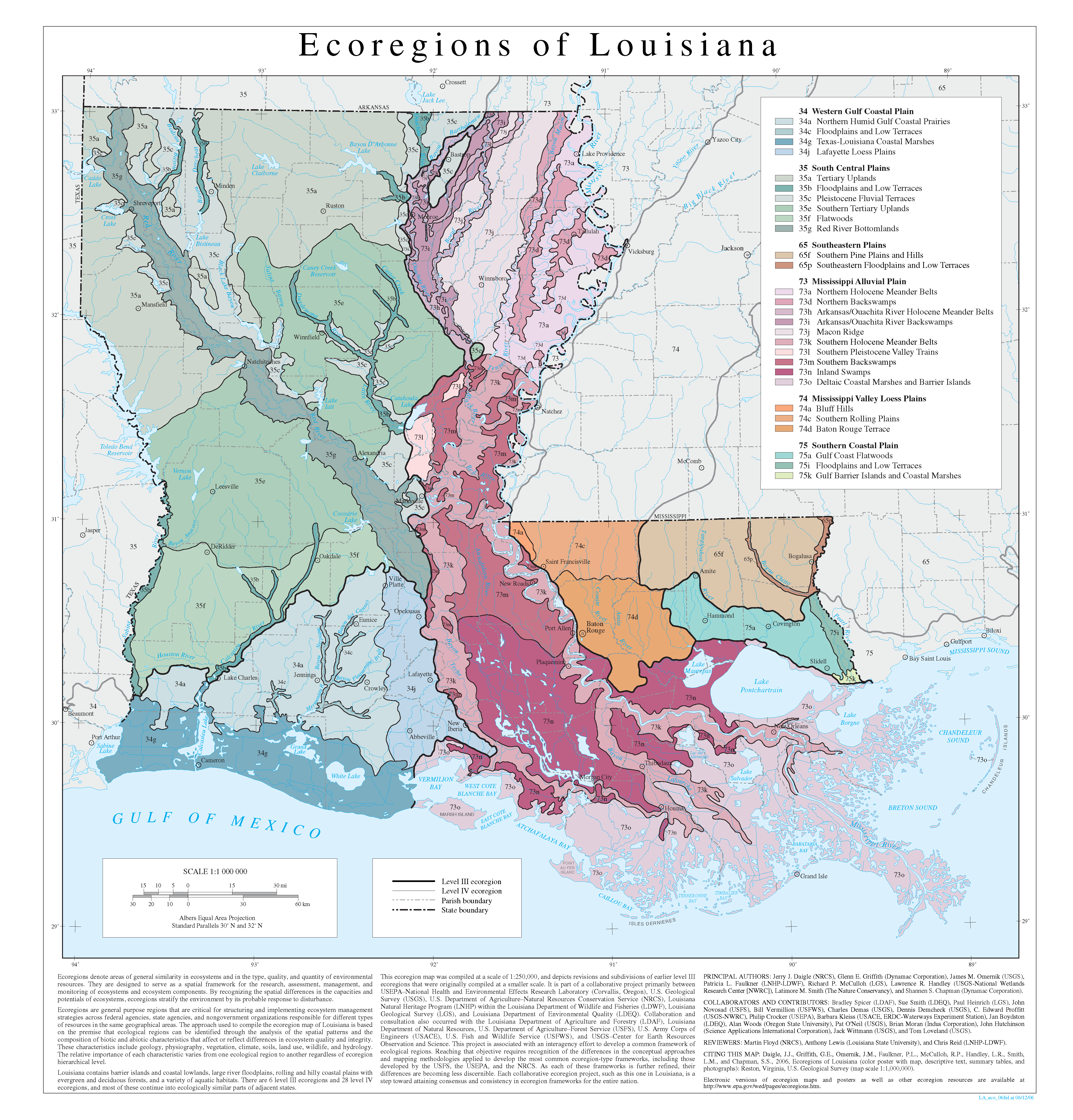
USEPA's Level III and Level IV ecoregions of Louisiana

The USEPA's ecoregions are identified through the analysis of the spatial patterns and the composition of biotic and abiotic characteristics that affect or reflect differences in ecosystem quality and integrity. These characteristics include geology, physiography, vegetation, climate, soils, land use, wildlife, and hydrology. The relative importance of each characteristic varies from one ecological region to another regardless of ecoregion hierarchical level.

Louisiana contains barrier islands and coastal lowlands, large river floodplains, rolling and hilly coastal plains with evergreen and deciduous forests, and a variety of aquatic habitats. There are 6 level III ecoregions and 28 level IV ecoregions, and most of these continue into ecologically similar parts of adjacent states.

=== 34 Western Gulf Coastal Plain ===
- 34a Northern Humid Gulf Coastal Prairies
- 34c Floodplains and Low Terraces

=== 35 South Central Plains ===
- 35a Tertiary Uplands
- 35b Floodplains and Low Terraces
- 35c Pleistocene Fluvial Terraces
- 35e Southern Tertiary Uplands
- 35f Flatwoods
- 35g Red River Bottomlands

=== 65 Southeastern Plains ===
- 65f Southern Pine Plains and Hills
- 65p Southeastern Floodplains and Low Terraces

=== 73 Mississippi Alluvial Plain ===
- 73a Northern Holocene Meander Belts
- 73d Northern Backswamps
- 73h Arkansas/Ouachita River Holocene Meander Belts
- 73i Arkansas/Ouachita River Backswamps
- 73j Macon Ridge
- 73k Southern Holocene Meander Belts
- 73l Southern Pleistocene Valley Trains
- 73m Southern Backswamps
- 73n Inland Swamps
- 73o Deltaic Coastal Marshes and Barrier Islands

=== 74 Mississippi Valley Loess Plains ===
- 74a Bluff Hills (Tunica Hills)
- 74c Southern Rolling Plains
- 74d Baton Rouge Terrace

=== 75 Southern Coastal Plain ===
- 75a Gulf Coast Flatwoods
- 75i Floodplains and Low Terraces
- 75k Gulf Barrier Islands and Coastal Marshes

== World Wildlife Fund ==
WWF ecoregions are defined as "relatively large units of land or water containing a distinct assemblage of natural communities sharing a large majority of species, dynamics, and environmental conditions.... Ecoregions represent the original distribution of distinct assemblages of species and communities."

Realm	Biome	Ecoregion
Nearctic	Temperate broadleaf and mixed forests	Mississippi lowland forests
Nearctic	Temperate broadleaf and mixed forests	Southeastern mixed forests
Nearctic	Temperate coniferous forests	Piney Woods forests
Nearctic	Temperate coniferous forests	Southeastern conifer forests
Nearctic	Tropical and subtropical grasslands, savannas, and shrublands	Western Gulf coastal grasslands
