= Theodore Roosevelt National Wildlife Refuge Complex =

United States National Wildlife Refuge complex in Mississippi

- IUCN category IV (habitat/species management area)
- Location within the United States
- Location: Mississippi, United States
- Nearest city: Hollandale, Mississippi
- Coordinates: 33.104898°N 90.987557°W
- Area: 100,000 acres (40,000 ha)
- Governing body: U.S. Fish and Wildlife Service

The Theodore Roosevelt National Wildlife Refuge Complex is the largest refuge complex in the state of Mississippi. Over 100,000 acres (400 km^{2}) of refuge lands on seven refuges, including 13,000 acres (53 km^{2}) of refuge-managed Farmers Home Administration lands, provide vital habitat for fish and wildlife in the Delta region.

The complex includes seven refuges:

- Yazoo National Wildlife Refuge – established 1936
- Hillside National Wildlife Refuge – established 1975
- Morgan Brake National Wildlife Refuge – established 1977
- Panther Swamp National Wildlife Refuge – established 1978
- Mathews Brake National Wildlife Refuge – established 1980
- Holt Collier National Wildlife Refuge – established 2004
- Theodore Roosevelt National Wildlife Refuge – established 2004

The headquarters office for Theodore Roosevelt National Wildlife Refuge Complex is located on Yazoo National Wildlife Refuge.

== History ==
In January 2004, the Consolidated Appropriations Act changed the name of the Central Mississippi Refuges Complex to Theodore Roosevelt National Wildlife Refuge Complex. The legislation established two new refuges in the complex – Holt Collier NWR and Theodore Roosevelt NWR, and included provisions to design and construct the Holt Collier Environmental Education and Interpretation Center in the south Delta region. The two new refuges were named to honor President Theodore Roosevelt and the legendary African-American sportsman and hunting guide, Holt Collier.

== Topography ==
Theodore Roosevelt National Wildlife Refuge Complex manages approximately 42,000 acres (170 km^{2}) of bottomland hardwood forest in the Mississippi Delta region. Refuge staff have reforested an additional 25,000 acres (100 km^{2}) of former agricultural land, bringing the complex's total area of bottomland forest to 67,000 acres (270 km^{2}).

More than 60 species of trees are known to occur on the complex. The lowest areas on refuge lands contain bald cypress, buttonbush, and water tupelo, except on Yazoo National Wildlife Refuge, where water tupelo does not occur. Other woody species in permanent or semi-permanent flooded areas include swamp privet, water elm, black willow and water locust.

Prior to European settlement, the Lower Mississippi Valley was covered with over 24 million acres (97,000 km^{2}) of bottomland hardwood forest that supported a rich diversity of fish and wildlife species. Historically, the dominant forest type was oak-gum-cypress. Canebrakes covered the broader flats on slightly higher ground, forming extensive nearly pure stands beneath huge bottomland hardwood trees. Settlers began clearing the forest in the early 19th century. Today more than 75% of the forest coverage has been lost to land clearing operations for agriculture, transportation, industrialization, and urbanization. The remaining 4.8 million acres (19,000 km^{2}) of forest are isolated islands of habitat surrounded by cotton, corn, rice, and bean fields. Most of the surviving forests now occupy low ground dominated by water tolerant species.

== See also ==
- List of National Wildlife Refuges
- Holt Collier National Wildlife Refuge
- Yazoo National Wildlife Refuge
