= Mississippi Valley Loess Plains (ecoregion) =

Level III ecoregion in the United States

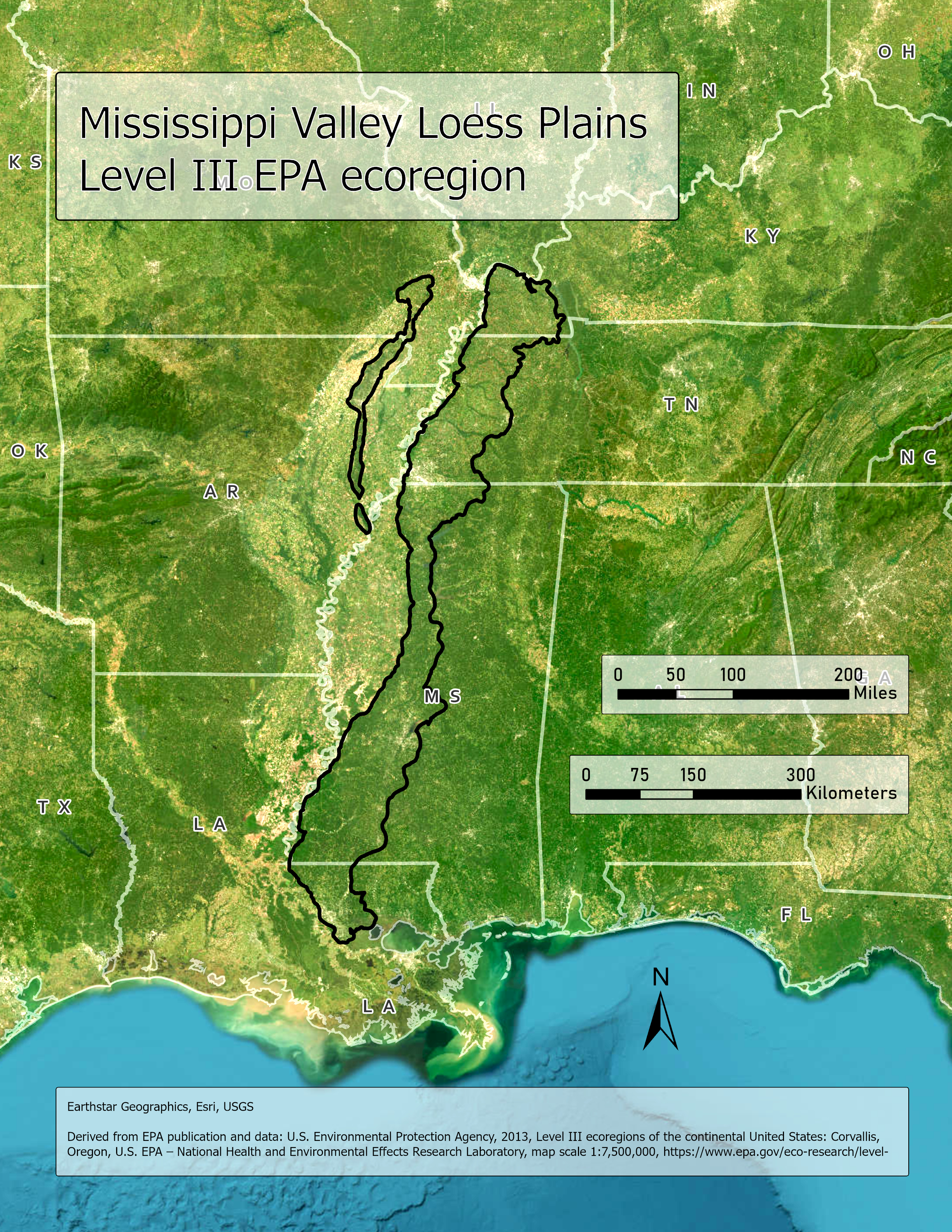
- Satellite imagery of the Mississippi Valley Loess Plains
- Mississippi Valley Loess Plains ecoregion

Ecology
- Realm: Nearctic
- Biome: Temperate broadleaf and mixed forests
- Borders: List: Interior River Valleys and Hills (72); Interior Low Plateaus (71); Southeastern Plains (65); Southern Coastal Plain (75); Mississippi Alluvial Plain (73)

Geography
- Area: 48,834 km^{2} (18,855 mi^{2})
- Country: United States
- States: Kentucky; Missouri; Tennessee; Arkansas; Mississippi; Louisiana
- Coordinates: 33°N 90°W
- Geology: Irregular plains and hills with thick loess deposits
- Climate type: Humid subtropical

The North American Mississippi Valley Loess Plains are a Level III ecoregion designated by the Environmental Protection Agency (EPA) in six U.S. states. The region lies primarily on the eastern border of the Mississippi Alluvial Plain, from the Ohio River in western Kentucky, through Tennessee and Mississippi, to Louisiana. A separate unit that includes Crowley's Ridge occurs west of the river in Arkansas and Missouri. It has been divided into four Level IV ecoregions.

== Description ==
=== Climate ===
The ecoregion has a mild mid-latitude humid subtropical climate, marked by hot summers and mild winters. The mean annual temperature is approximately 14 °C (57 °F) in the north and 20 °C (68 °F) in the south. The frost-free period ranges from 200 to 290 days. The mean annual precipitation is 1,419 millimetres (55.9 in), from 1,140 millimetres (45 in) in the north to 1,650 millimetres (65 in) in the south.

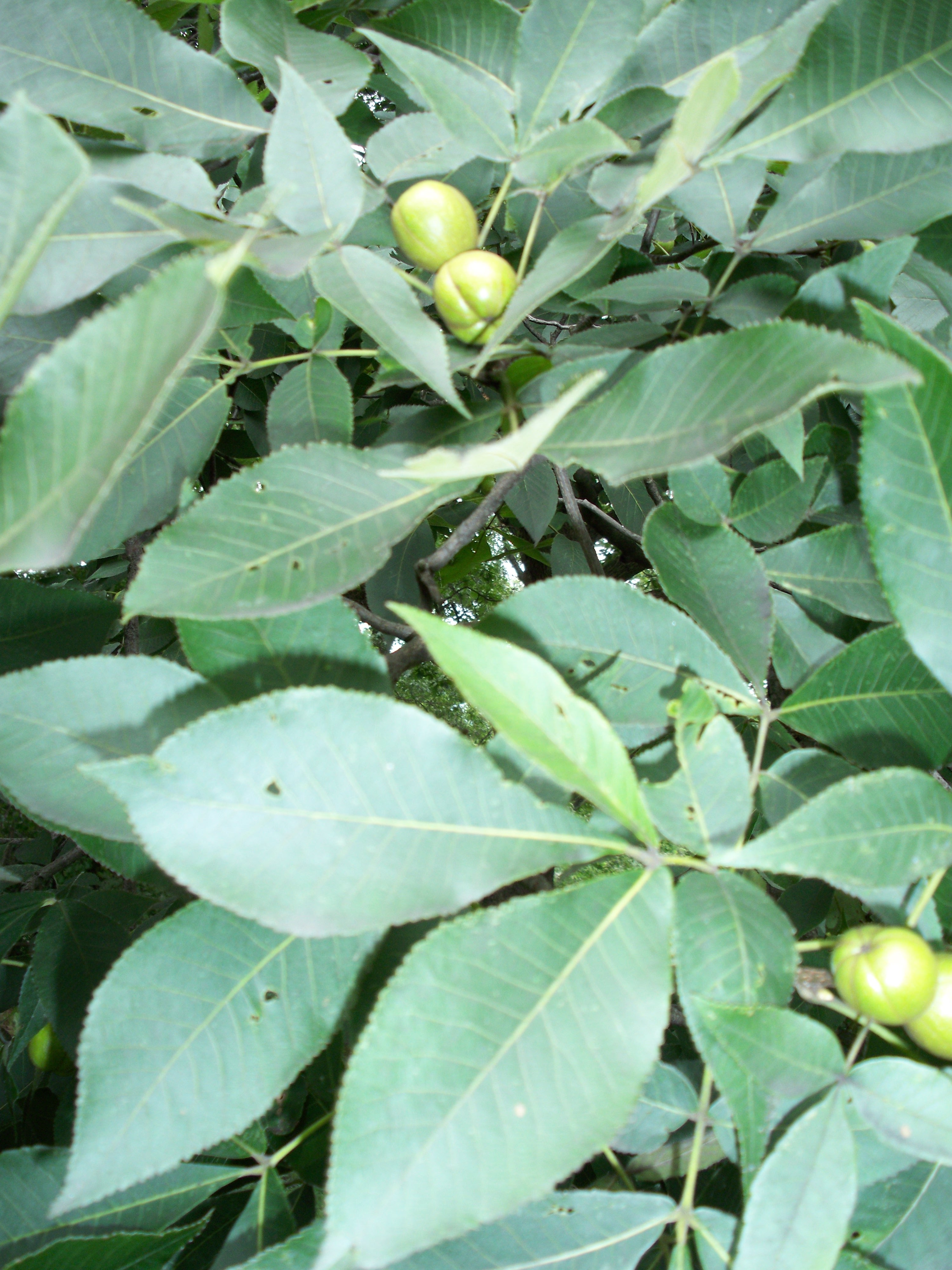
Hickory (Carya ovata) at Arnold Arboretum in Boston, MA

=== Vegetation ===
In the more gently rolling plains portion to the east, upland forests are dominated by oaks, hickories, and both loblolly and shortleaf pine. To the west, in the more rugged Bluff Hills portion, oak–hickory forest along with southern mesophytic forests contain beech, maples, sweetgum, basswood, tulip poplar, southern magnolia, and American holly.

=== Hydrology ===
The ecoregion has low to moderate gradient perennial and intermittent streams, with sandy and silty substrates. There are few or no lakes.

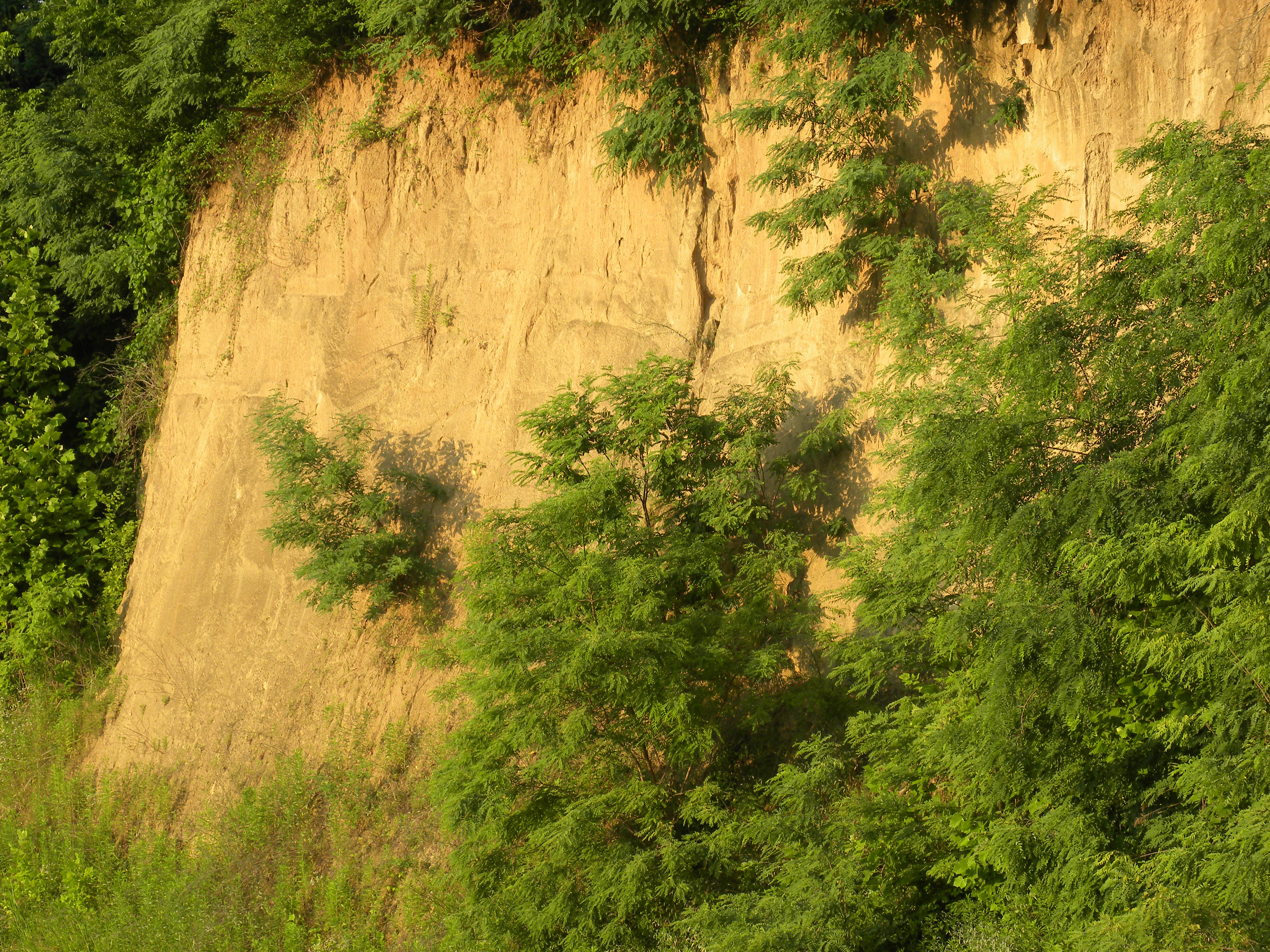
Exposed loess near Vicksburg, located in the Bluff Hills region (74a)

=== Terrain ===
The Mississippi Valley Loess Plains are irregular plains, some gently rolling hills, and dissected hills, ridges, and bluffs near the Mississippi River. The presence of thick deposits of loess is one of the distinguishing characteristics. The Bluff Hills in the western portion contain soils that are very deep, steep, silty, and erosive. Flatter topography is found to the east. Tertiary deposits of sand, silt, and clay underlie the region. Alfisols, Inceptisols, Entisols, and Ultisols are dominant, with thermic soil temperatures and udic and some perudic soil moisture regimes.

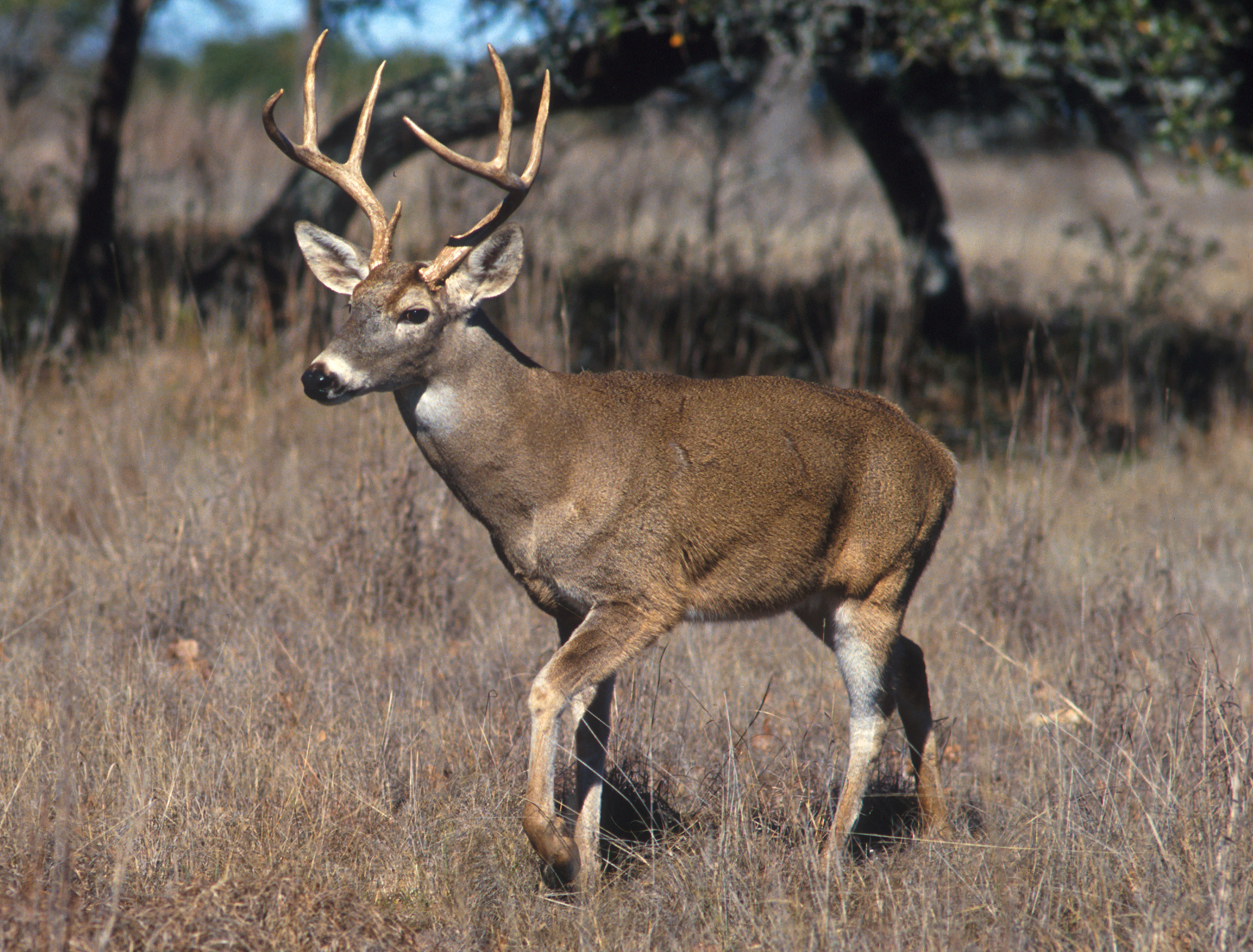
White-tailed deer

=== Wildlife ===
Common species include white-tailed deer, red fox, raccoon, weasel, gray squirrel, wood thrush, Carolina wren, bobwhite quail, mourning dove, wild turkey, and bayou darter.

=== Land Use/Human Activities ===
Agriculture is typical in the Kentucky and Tennessee portion of the region, while in Arkansas, Mississippi, and Louisiana there is a mosaic of forest, pine plantations, pasture, and cropland. Crops include soybeans, cotton, corn, wheat, and hay. There is some oil and gas production in the south. Larger towns and cities include Paragould, Jonesboro, Mayfield, Memphis, Holly Springs, Grenada, Vicksburg, Jackson, Brookhaven, McComb, and Baton Rouge.

=== Protected areas ===
The following federally protected areas lie within this ecoregion:

- Clarks River National Wildlife Refuge, in 74b and 72a
- Hatchie National Wildlife Refuge, in 74b
- Lower Hatchie National Wildlife Refuge, in 74b
- Ozark–St. Francis National Forest, in 74a
- Homochitto National Forest, in 74c
- Natchez Trace Parkway (spans many ecoregions)
- Natchez National Historical Park, in 74a

== Level IV ecoregions ==
Map of the Mississippi Valley Loess Plains' Level IV ecoregions

=== Bluff Hills (74a) ===
The Bluff Hills consist of sand, clay, silt, and lignite, and are capped by loess deposits often greater than 50 feet (15 m) thick. This disjunct region tends to have deeper loess and is steeper, more dissected, and generally more forested than neighboring 74b. The carved loess has a mosaic of microenvironments, including dry slopes and ridges, moist slopes, ravines, bottomland areas and small cypress swamps. Species with more northern affinities occur far to the south in this region. This combination of northern and southern flora and fauna creates a diverse assemblage of species. While oak–hickory forest is the general natural vegetation type, some of the undisturbed bluff vegetation is rich in mesophytes, such as beech (Fagus grandifolia) and maples (Acer spp.). Other common forest trees include sweetgum (Liquidambar styraciflua), basswood (Tilia americana), eastern hophornbeam (Ostrya virginiana), and tulip poplar (Liriodendron tulipifera), while forests in the southern part of the region contain more southern magnolia (Magnolia grandiflora), water oak (Quercus nigra), and Spanish moss (Tillandsia usneoides). In the northern part of the region, in Kentucky, sugar maple (Acer saccharum) and bitternut hickory (Carya cordiformis) appear. The cool ravines contain some higher gradient streams and areas of gravel substrate, creating distinct aquatic habitats. Severe erosion has occurred in many parts of 74a, particularly when the soils lack adequate vegetative cover.

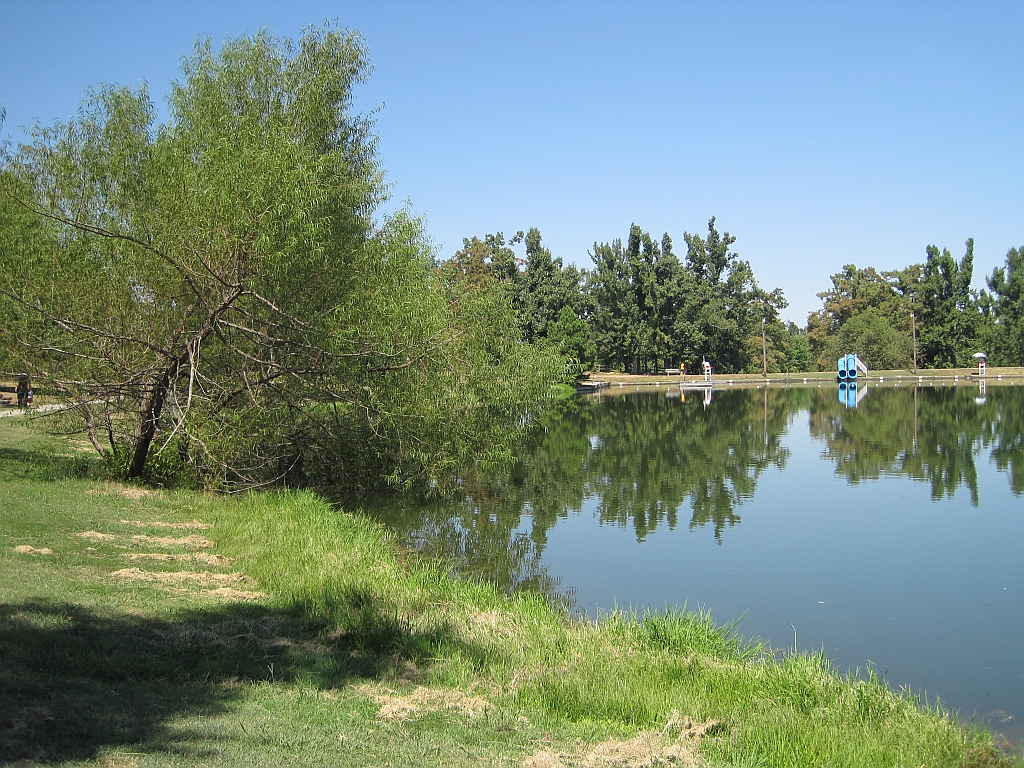
Crowley's Ridge State Park

==== Crowley's Ridge ====
Crowley's Ridge, the only portion of the Bluff Hills (74a) ecoregion in Arkansas, is a disjunct series of loess-capped hills surrounded by the lower, flatter Mississippi Alluvial Plain (73). Crowley's Ridge, with elevations of up to 500 feet (150 m), is of sufficient height to have trapped wind-blown silt during the Pleistocene Epoch. It was formed by the aggregation of loess and the subsequent erosion by streams. The loess is subject to vertical sloughing when wet. Spring-fed streams and seep areas occur on the lower slopes and in basal areas where Tertiary sands and gravels, that were never removed by the Mississippi River, are exposed. Soils are generally well-drained; they are generally more loamy than those found in the surrounding Northern Pleistocene Valley Trains (73b) and St. Francis Lowlands (73c). Wooded land and pastureland are common; only limited cropland is found in Ecoregion 74a. Post oak–blackjack oak forest, southern red oak–white oak forest, and beech–maple forest occur. Undisturbed ravine vegetation can be rich in mesophytes, such as beech and sugar maple. Oaks still dominate most of these mesophytic communities. The forests of the Bluff Hills (74a) are usually classified as oak–beech. They are related to the beech–maple cove forests of the Appalachian Mountains; like the Appalachian cove forests, tulip poplar dominates early successional communities, at least in the southern ridge. In Arkansas, tulip poplar is native only to the Bluff Hills (74a). Shortleaf pine grows on the sandier soils of the northern ridge.

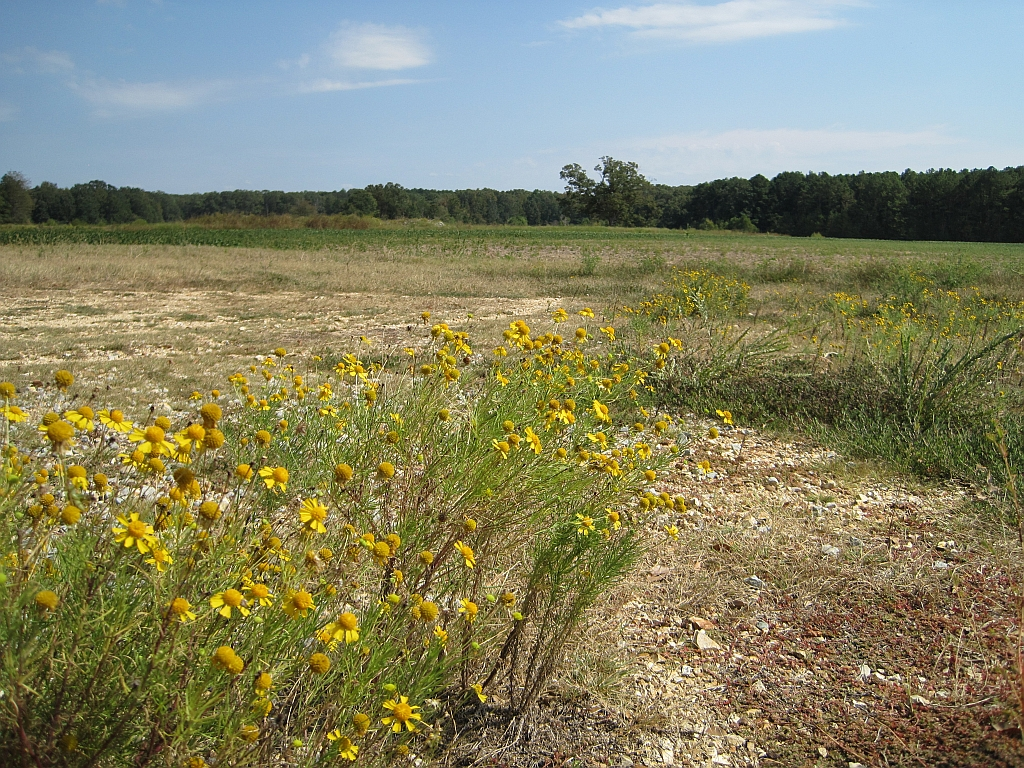
Hatchie National Wildlife Refuge, in the Loess Plains

=== Loess Plains (74b) ===
The Loess Plains ecoregion was once a highly productive agricultural area in Mississippi, although many areas are now in pine plantations or have reverted to a mixed forest landscape. The gently rolling to irregular plains are a contrast to the more dissected bluffs of Bluff Hills (74a). The loess layer tends to be thinner than neighboring 74a, and thins more to the east in the broad transition to the Southeastern Plains. Streams and rivers tend to be low gradient and murky with silty and sandy substrates; many have been channelized. Severe erosion in earlier years contributed heavy sediment loads to downstream reaches.

In Tennessee, several large river systems with wide floodplains—the Obion, Forked Deer, Hatchie, Loosahatchie, and Wolf—cross the region.

In Kentucky, the Loess Plains ecoregion is a productive agricultural area. It is mantled by thick loess and alluvium and is underlain by weak, unconsolidated coastal plain sediments. Ecoregion 74b is lithologically distinct from higher, more easterly ecoregions. Potential natural vegetation is a mosaic of oak–hickory forest and bluestem prairie and is unlike the southern floodplain forest of Ecoregions 72a (Wabash–Ohio Bottomlands) and 73a (Holocene Meander Belts). Grasslands and forested wetlands were once widespread here and in the Western Pennyroyal Karst Plain (71e). Most of the original vegetation has now been replaced by cropland. Extensive corn, soybean, wheat, hay, tobacco, livestock, and poultry farming occurs. Agricultural runoff has degraded surface water quality. High turbidity and siltation are common in the streams and rivers of Ecoregion 74b.

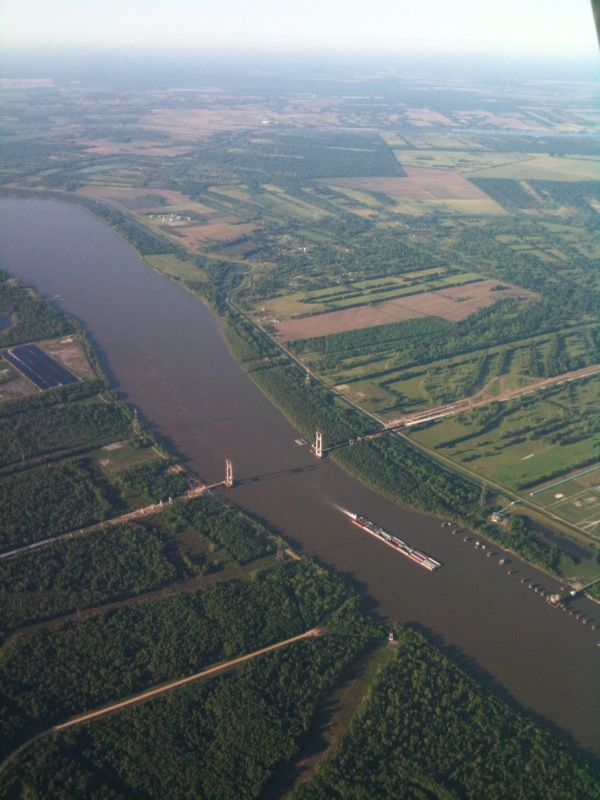
Aerial photo of the river boundary between regions 73k (bottom left) and 74c (top right) near St. Francisville.

=== Southern Rolling Plains (74c) ===
The Southern Rolling Plains ecoregion occurs on younger, Miocene and Pleistocene-age geologic formations compared to 74b (Loess Plains) to the north, and it has a warmer climate. The general climatic shift from 74b includes warmer average annual air temperatures, greater annual rainfall, and a transition to slightly warmer soils. The region has more irregular and dissected topography than the adjacent portion of the Loess Plains (74b) to the north that has more agriculture. Soils of this region are often more loamy or clayey and the loess layer is thinner than in 74a and 74b. Land cover is mostly loblolly and shortleaf pine (Pinus taeda, P. echinata) forest or pine plantations, and forests have a higher concentration of pine than in 74a and 74b. Timber production occurs on the Homochitto National Forest, and oil and gas production and exploration has been widespread in the region during the past fifty years. The Louisiana part of this region also has pasture and cropland. The eastern boundary of this region is broad, with a gradual transition to the Southeastern Plains.

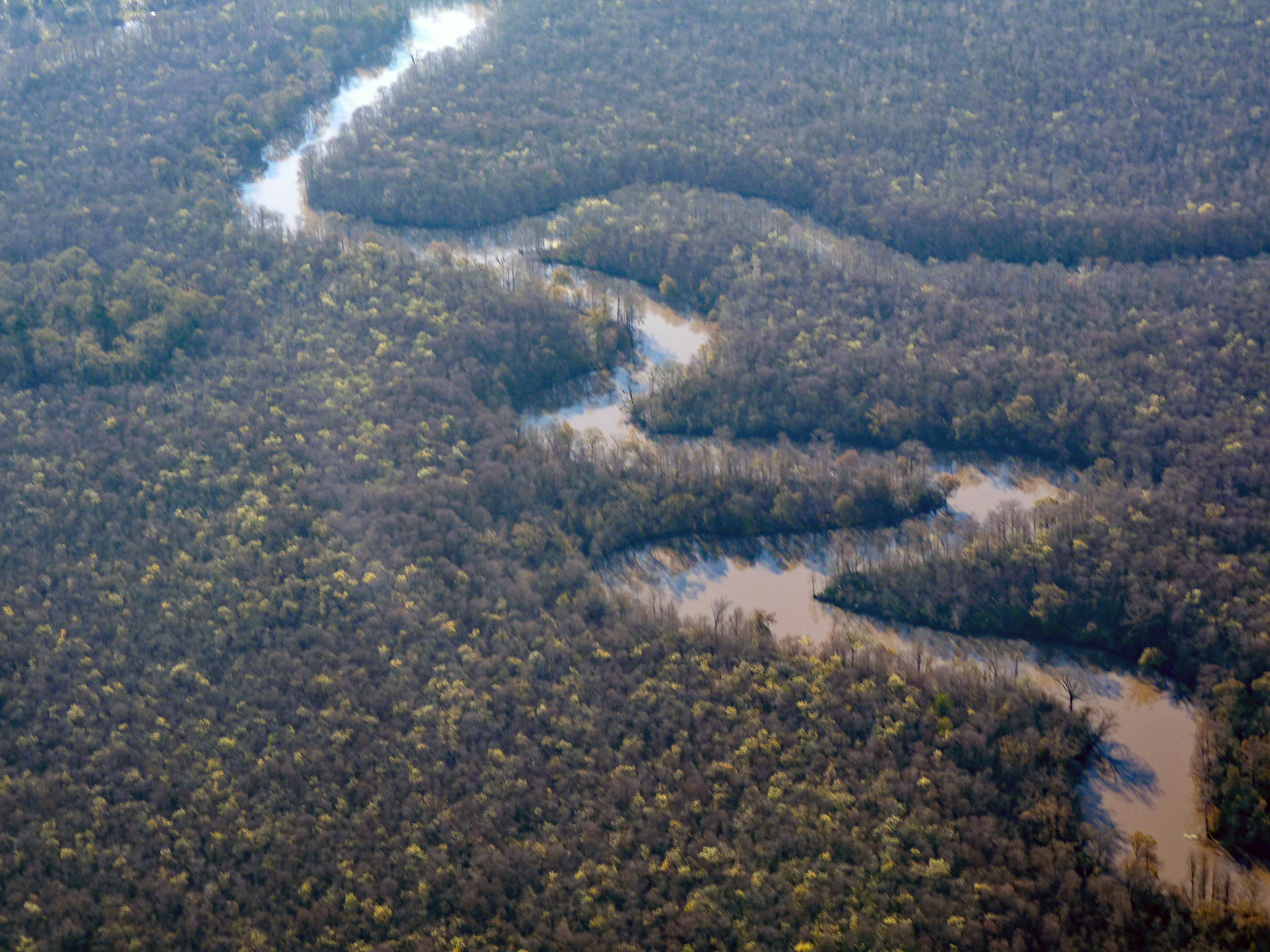
The Amite River, located in the Baton Rouge Terrace (74d)

=== Baton Rouge Terrace (74d) ===
The Baton Rouge Terrace ecoregion occurs on the Pleistocene Prairie Terraces and is lower in elevation and has flatter topography than Ecoregion 74c to the north. Similar to other parts of Ecoregion 74, loess is thicker to the west. The soils are mostly Alfisols with brown or grayish-brown, silt loam surfaces that developed in the loess parent materials. High sodium soils are common. The natural vegetation was influenced by the unusual soil conditions and by different forest types occurring in adjacent regions, with some upland hardwoods to the northwest, hardwood flatwoods and spruce-pine–hardwood mixed forests across extensive broad flats, and many areas of bottomland hardwoods. Large areas of the mixed pine–hardwood forest have now been cleared for pasture, cropland, and urban uses. Urban uses cover about fifty percent of the region, comprising the Baton Rouge metropolitan area.
