= Darlove, Mississippi =

- Unincorporated community
- Location within Mississippi Location within the United States
- Coordinates: 33°13′55″N 90°47′04″W
- Country: United States
- State: Mississippi
- County: Washington
- Elevation: 108 ft (33 m)
- Time zone: UTC-6 (Central (CST))
  - Summer (DST): UTC-5 (CDT)
- ZIP code: 38748
- Area code: 662
- GNIS feature ID: 669116

Darlove is an unincorporated community located in Washington County, Mississippi, Darlove is approximately 7 miles (11 km) southwest of Kinlock and approximately 9 miles (14 km) north-northeast of Hollandale.

Darlove is located on the west boundary of the Holt Collier National Wildlife Refuge, and the Bogue Phalia, a tributary of the Sunflower River, flows next to the community.
