= Holt Collier National Wildlife Refuge =

United States National Wildlife Refuge in Mississippi

- IUCN category IV (habitat/species management area)
- Location within Mississippi Location within the United States
- Location: Washington County, Mississippi, United States
- Nearest city: Darlove, Mississippi
- Coordinates: 33.23194°N 90.78444°W
- Area: 1,400 acres (567 ha)
- Established: 2004
- Named for: Holt Collier
- Governing body: U.S. Fish and Wildlife Service
- Website: Holt Collier National Wildlife Refuge

The Holt Collier National Wildlife Refuge is one of seven refuges in the Theodore Roosevelt National Wildlife Refuge Complex and is a 1,400-acre (567 ha) National Wildlife Refuge located on Bogue Phalia near Darlove, Mississippi. The Refuge was named after Holt Collier (1846–1936), a Confederate veteran, cowboy, and tracker; and was created in order to provide a habitat and resources for over 250 songbirds. Moreover, approximately 1,000 acres (4 km^{2}) has been set aside for reforestation.

== History ==
Holt Collier National Wildlife Refuge is the only refuge to be named in honor of an African American.

Before 2004 the Farmers Home Administration managed the lands for the purpose of conservation until they were transferred to the United States Fish and Wildlife Service.
