= Tesheva Creek =

Stream in Mississippi, United States

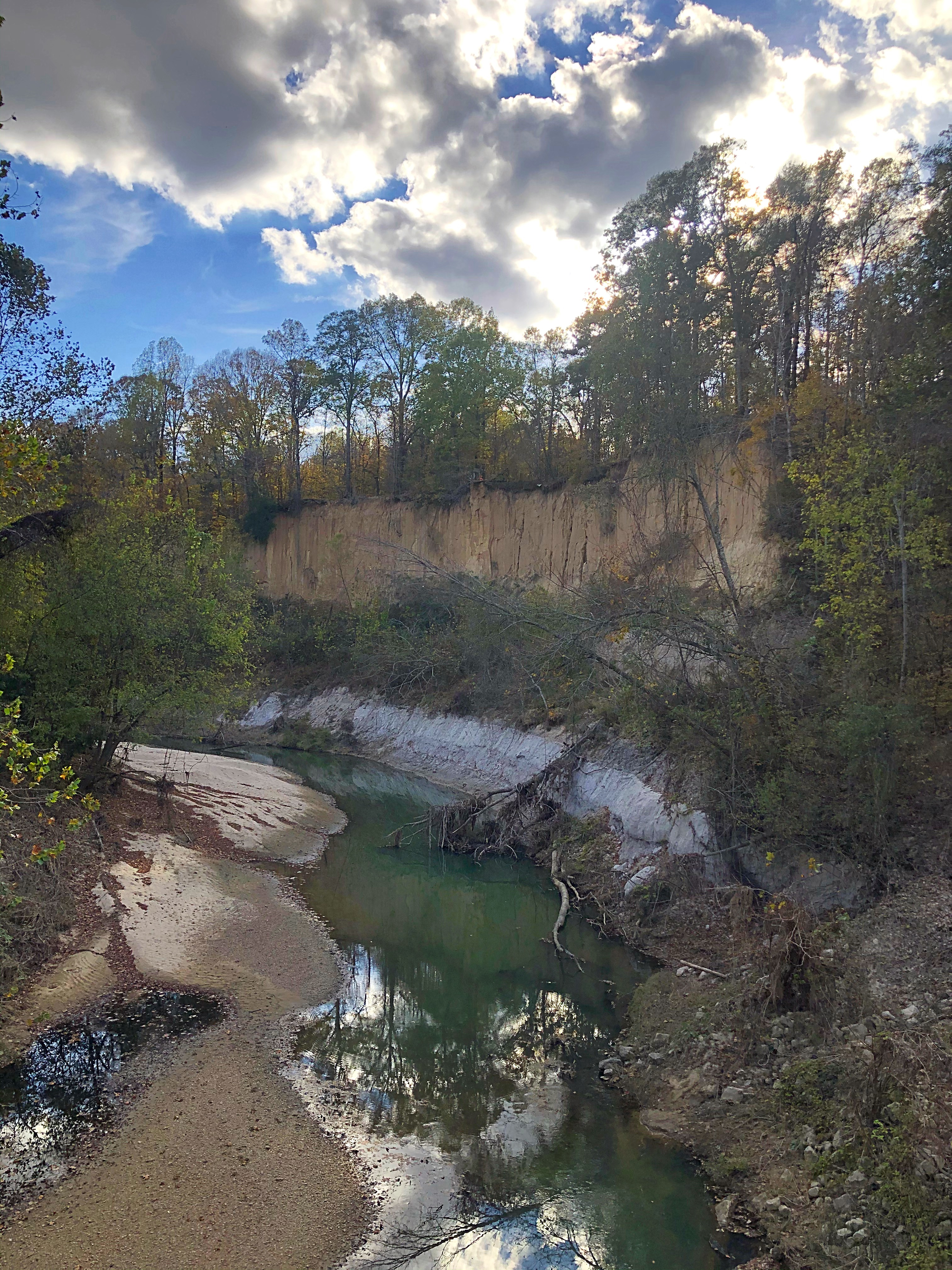
- Tesheva Creek, Eden, MS

- Location in Mississippi Location in the United States

Physical characteristics
- Mouth
  - coordinates: 33.022365°N 90.346194°W

Tesheva Creek is a stream in the U.S. state of Mississippi.

Tesheva is a name derived from the Choctaw language purported to mean either "one who goes and washes" or "what is used to wash one with" (i.e. soap). Variant names are "Techevah Creek", "Techeyeh Creek", "Tesecah Creek", "Teshecah Creek", "Tesheeah Creek", "Tesheevah Creek", and "Teshevah Creek".

== Popular culture ==
In 2015, the "Southern Psychedelic" rock group Tesheva adopted the name.
