= Holt Collier =

African-American bear hunter (c.1848–1936)

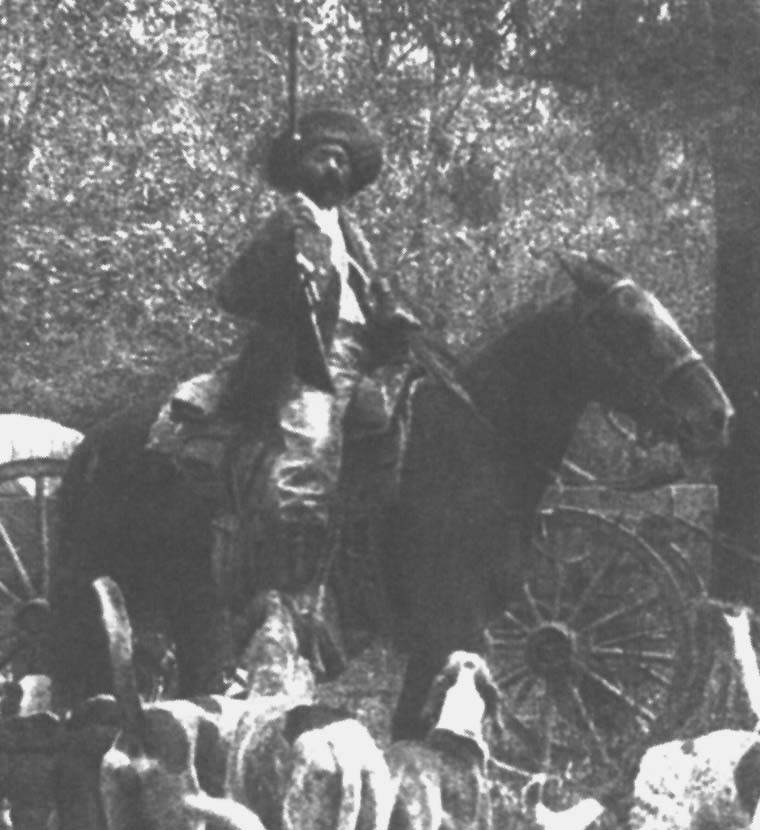
- Holt Collier at age 61, 1907
- Born: c. 1848; Mississippi, US
- Died: August 1, 1936; Greenville, Mississippi
- Occupations: Hunter, Confederate Soldier
- Known for: Guiding Pres. Theodore Roosevelt, while hunting for black bears.

Holt Collier (c. 1848 – August 1, 1936) was a noted African-American bear hunter and sportsman. While leading a hunt for U.S. President Teddy Roosevelt in November 1902, Collier unwittingly set the stage for the event that originated Roosevelt's nickname, "Teddy Bear."

== Biography ==
Collier was born circa 1848 as a slave in Mississippi and was the third generation to be enslaved by the Hinds family on Plum Ridge Plantation, built by General Thomas Hinds, who was a veteran of the Battle of New Orleans in 1815. At the request of General Andrew Jackson, Hinds had surveyed central Mississippi and chose the site for the state capital, Jackson, before settling nearby in the area which is now Hinds County.

Collier killed his first bear at the age of ten; after that, he was tasked to use his skills to supply meat for the table of the Hinds family and the dozens of other African American enslaved people. With the outbreak of the American Civil War, Collier’s master Howell Hinds left for the war. Collier ran away to go serve with his master, and was given his freedom. He worked as an aide in a military hospital. During a skirmish near Bowling Green, KY, Holt hears the sounds of musketry, and takes the Musket and Accoutrements of a hospital patient, and joins the battle, firing at incoming Union forces. At the Battle of Shiloh, Holt Collier sees the death of General Albert Sidney Johnston, He reported on his pension record in 1906, that he was wounded in combat during the Battle of Shiloh. After his recovery, he was transferred to Company I, Ninth Texas Cavalry, and fought alongside the 9th for the remainder of The War. During Reconstruction, Collier was tried by a military tribunal in Vicksburg for the murder of a white man, Captain James King. The accusation may have stemmed from King's advocacy for using Freedmens Bureau labor on the Hinds plantation. After his acquittal, Collier left the state upon the advice of William Alexander Percy of Greenville, who was later the last U.S. senator from Mississippi elected by a state legislature.

According to Roosevelt, Collier killed more than three thousand bears during his lifetime. Such was Collier's fame among big-game hunters that Major George M. Helm asked him to serve as President Theodore Roosevelt's tracker during his famous Mississippi bear hunt of 1902. The hunt was very high profile, and attended by noted big-game hunters, among whom was John Avery McIlhenny of Avery Island, Louisiana, who had served with Roosevelt in the Rough Riders during the Spanish–American War.

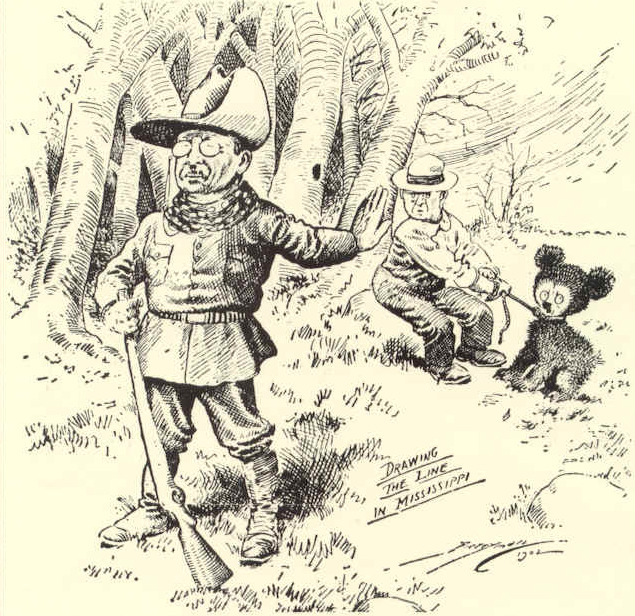
Clifford Berryman's 1902 cartoon "Drawing the Line in Mississippi"

On that hunt, Collier and his tracking dogs cornered a large male bear, which Collier tied to a tree. By Collier's account, when the President arrived, Collier told him not to shoot the bear while it was tied up, and Roosevelt complied. The Washington Post and other newspapers publicized Roosevelt's compassion for the animal, and an editorial cartoon of the event by Clifford Berryman titled "Drawing the line in Mississippi" which erroneously depicted the bear as a cub, eventually gave rise to the "Teddy Bear" phenomenon.

Teddy Roosevelt was greatly impressed with Collier's abilities. He served again as Roosevelt's tracker during a Louisiana bear hunt in 1907. Holt Collier National Wildlife Refuge in Mississippi is named in his honor. He died in 1936 and is interred in Greenville, Mississippi.

== See also ==
- List of famous big game hunters
