= Yazoo National Wildlife Refuge =

United States National Wildlife Refuge in Mississippi

- IUCN category IV (habitat/species management area)
- Location within the United States
- Location: Washington County, Mississippi, United States
- Nearest city: Hollandale, Mississippi
- Coordinates: 33.104898°N 90.987557°W
- Area: 12,941 acres (52.37 km^{2})
- Established: 1936
- Visitors: 144,710 (in 2004)
- Governing body: U.S. Fish and Wildlife Service
- Website: Yazoo National Wildlife Refuge

The Yazoo National Wildlife Refuge is a 12,941 acre (52.4 km^{2}) National Wildlife Refuge located in Washington County, Mississippi. Named after the Yazoo tribe, it was established to provide waterfowl and other migratory birds in the Mississippi Flyway with nesting, feeding, brooding, and resting habitat.

The refuge also serves as the headquarters for the Theodore Roosevelt National Wildlife Refuge Complex, and is maintained with an eleven-person staff with a fiscal year 2005 budget of $2,097,000.

The refuge office also administers 12,800 acres (51.8 km^{2}) of Farmers Home Administration (FmHA) transfer properties: 42 fee title tracts and 12 easements. A Cooperative farming program provides 3,942 acres (16.0 km^{2}) for local farmers to use.

== History ==
In the early 1900s, natural habitat supplemented by agricultural crops provided excellent waterfowl hunting in and around the refuge area. Records indicate that ducks, geese and swans were abundant throughout the wintering season. Hunters came from as far away as New England to participate in the sport.

Land acquisition began under authority of the Migratory Bird Treaty Act and Migratory Bird Hunting Stamp Act in 1936 with the initial purchase of 2,166 acres (8.77 km^{2}). In March, 1937, an additional 639 acres (2.59 km^{2}) were purchased with plans to acquire 20,000 acres (80 km^{2}). The refuge remained unstaffed from 1936 until 1956. In 1959 the refuge office was built.

The Service was given permission to purchase additional land in 1960 under the provision of Section 5928 of the Mississippi Code of 1942, re-compiled by Governor Ross R. Barnett. Various tracts were purchased from individuals and hunting clubs until a total of 12,471 acres (50.5 km^{2}) was reached on July 30, 1969. As land acquisition progressed, habitat management was diversified for mourning doves, wood ducks, Canada geese and colonial wading birds, along with endangered and resident species. A nucleus flock of wild turkey was introduced in 1970. In 1992, the Service purchased the 470 acre (1.9 km^{2}) Cox property bringing total refuge area to 12,941 acres (52.4 km^{2}).

== Topography ==
Yazoo National Wildlife Refuge's 12,941 acres (52.4 km^{2}) of undulating Delta soils range from heavy clay to silt loam and limited sand ridges (hot spots). Most farm area is classed as prime agricultural land. Elevations range from 90 feet (27 m) in the main drainage to 113 feet (34.4 m) in agricultural areas.

Yazoo NWR's primary feature is a 4,000+ acre (16 km^{2}) oxbow lake named Swan Lake which formed thousands of years ago when the Mississippi River abandoned a segment of riverbed. In years past, Silver Lake Bayou flowed into the oxbow lake, accelerating the deposit of silt and sediment on the lake bottom, making the lake more shallow. Recently, the Corps of Engineers constructed a new channel to divert silt-laden waters around Swan Lake. Weirs and water control structures maintain water levels in the oxbow lake while the new channel diverts silt-laden flows around the north side of Swan Lake and into Steele Bayou. The Corps project successfully prevents the accelerated build-up of sediment that has reduced water depths in Swan Lake.

The past meanderings of the Mississippi River have created a "ridge-and-swale" topography on the refuge that varies by 23 feet (7.0 m) in elevation. From 90 feet (27 m) above sea level in the swamp to 113 feet (34 m) on sandy ridges, this mixture of elevations translates into a diversity of habitats for wildlife. Refuge staff have utilized this rolling landscape and through the years have installed 96 water control structures creating over 70 impoundments which have provided a myriad of habitats for migratory waterfowl, colonial wading birds, alligators, and other wildlife. Since 1968, approximately 2,000 acres (8 km^{2}) of marginal agricultural lands have been reforested on Yazoo National Wildlife Refuge. Reforestation has been accomplished by direct-seeding with acorns and with seedling plantings. At least 20 tree species have been planted on refuge lands. These plantations, some of which are among the oldest on record, now provide unique opportunities for researchers to study the development process for the restoration of bottomland hardwoods over time. Reforestation on Yazoo National Wildlife Refuge catalyzed similar habitat restoration on other refuges and private lands throughout the southeast region.

Habitats vary from bottomland hardwoods to cypress swamps and agricultural fields. Emphasis is placed on providing food for wintering waterfowl, which utilize the refuge in large numbers, at times exceeding 250,000 birds. These foods consist of corn, milo, rice, wheat, etc. and moist-soil plants. The refuge has over 70 water management units and has restored over 2,000 acres (8 km^{2}) of marginal agricultural land to bottomland hardwoods.

== Wildlife and protected species ==
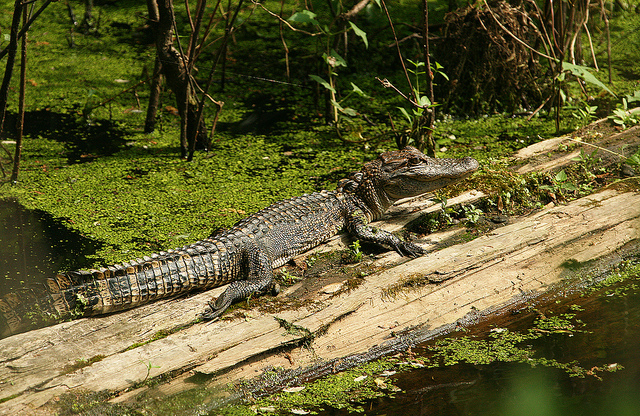
Young alligator sunning on a log in Yazoo National Wildlife Refuge

A unique opportunity for intensive moist-soil management occurred when the refuge purchased 240 acres (0.97 km^{2}) of abandoned catfish ponds known today as the Cox Ponds. The ponds were reshaped to provide optimal bottom and side slopes, and each pond has its own water control structure and drain. Irrigation wells provide a permanent water source for each pond, giving the refuge broad management options. A rotating cycle of management treatments in these 14 ponds provides habitat for waterfowl, shorebirds, long-legged waders, and other water birds. Some ponds are managed as moist-soil areas while others provide deep water habitat. Frequent visitors to the Cox Ponds include white ibis, glossy ibis, little blue and great blue herons, great egrets, snowy egrets and a wide variety of wintering dabbling and diving ducks. Habitat is provided for southward-bound shorebirds (about 20 species) from July 15 to November. In 2003, the first documented brood of black-bellied whistling ducks in Mississippi was photographed here. In August 2004, as many as thirteen grown ducks plus a brood of eight were observed, indicating an increasing population of this tropical species.

The well-established wood duck nest box program produces about 2,000 wood duck hatchlings a year. The boxes are prepared early in the year and checked frequently during nesting season to track hatches and remove non-viable eggs.

In addition to waterfowl, the white-tail deer is abundant; hunting is allowed for most native game species except waterfowl.

Opportunities for wildlife observation are excellent with good access to a diversity of habitats. The American alligator is a common site in refuge lakes and swamps. The endangered Louisiana black bear are occasionally observed. During fall, winter and spring, numerous visitors travel refuge roads to observe the diverse wildlife which includes white-tailed deer, wild turkey, waterfowl, bobcat, and otter.

== Facilities ==
The refuge features two wildlife observation areas:

- The Holt Collier Boardwalk and Observation Tower is a 0.25-mile (0.40 km) boardwalk trail leading to an observation platform on Lizard Lake. This area allows viewing of pied-billed grebes, moorhens, wading birds, wood ducks, and American alligators from the safety and comfort of the observation platform.
- At Alligator Pond, an open-sided observation tower provides excellent views of alligators, purple gallinules, moorhens, green herons and other wildlife.

The all-time-favorite for many visitors is the American alligator. A common resident of the refuge's many sloughs, streams, lakes, and shallow ponds, alligators can often be seen on warm spring days basking on logs or banks, or floating motionless. Common alligator locations are Holt Collier Horseshoe Pond, Alligator Pond, Lizard Lake, Deer Lake, and Alligator Alley.

=== Hunting and fishing ===
Yazoo National Wildlife Refuge offers excellent white-tail deer, squirrel, rabbit, and raccoon hunting opportunities. The deer muzzleloader and deer archery hunts are among the most popular hunts in the State. Because Yazoo NWR was established to provide sanctuary for migratory waterfowl, the refuge is closed to duck hunting. ATVs are prohibited on refuge roads and trails; however, all refuge roads are open to foot traffic except where posted.

The refuge is closed to fishing due to high levels of pesticides such as DDT and Toxaphene which are found in fish, water and sediment samples taken on the refuge.

== See also ==
- List of National Wildlife Refuges
