= Theodore Roosevelt National Wildlife Refuge =

United States National Wildlife Refuge in Mississippi

Coordinates: 32.960354°N 90.729489°W

Established in 2004, the Theodore Roosevelt National Wildlife Refuge is part of the Theodore Roosevelt National Wildlife Refuge Complex in Mississippi. Although the acquisition boundary for Theodore Roosevelt National Wildlife Refuge has been proposed near Onward, Mississippi, the land exchanges that are prerequisite have not yet been completed. Consequently, the refuge has not been opened for public use.
