= Mathews Brake National Wildlife Refuge =

United States National Wildlife Refuge in Mississippi

- IUCN category IV (habitat/species management area)
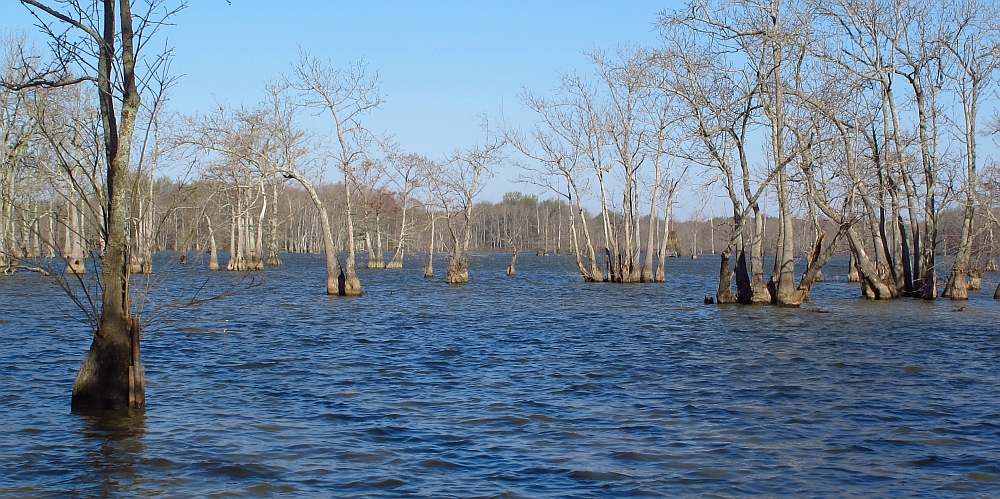
- Mathews Brake National Wildlife Refuge

- Location within the United States
- Location: Leflore County, Mississippi, United States
- Nearest city: Sidon, Mississippi
- Coordinates: 33°22′35″N 90°16′00″W
- Area: 2,418 acres (9.79 km^{2})
- Established: 1980
- Governing body: U.S. Fish and Wildlife Service
- Website: Mathews Brake National Wildlife Refuge

Mathews Brake National Wildlife Refuge encompasses 2,418 acres (9.79 km^{2}) in west-central Mississippi. Established in 1980, the refuge is one of seven national wildlife refuges in the Theodore Roosevelt National Wildlife Refuge Complex. The primary habitat feature is Mathews Brake, the largest brake (natural wooded wetland area) in Leflore County. Each winter the brake provides habitat for over 30,000 ducks.

Neotropical migratory birds use the refuge during migration seasons throughout the year. The refuge supports about 200 species of migratory birds, including priority species such as the prothonotary warbler. This little cavity nester is a species of concern in other areas, but has plenty of habitat around the wooded waters of Mathews Brake.

Refuge staff manage the water level in the brake to promote moist-soil plants and to sustain oak trees around the edges for migratory birds. Other habitat types include 422 acres (1.71 km^{2}) of bottomland hardwoods and 186 acres (0.75 km^{2}) of young hardwood plantations. Hunting and fishing are the most popular programs on the refuge.
