= Hatchie National Wildlife Refuge =

- IUCN category IV (habitat/species management area)
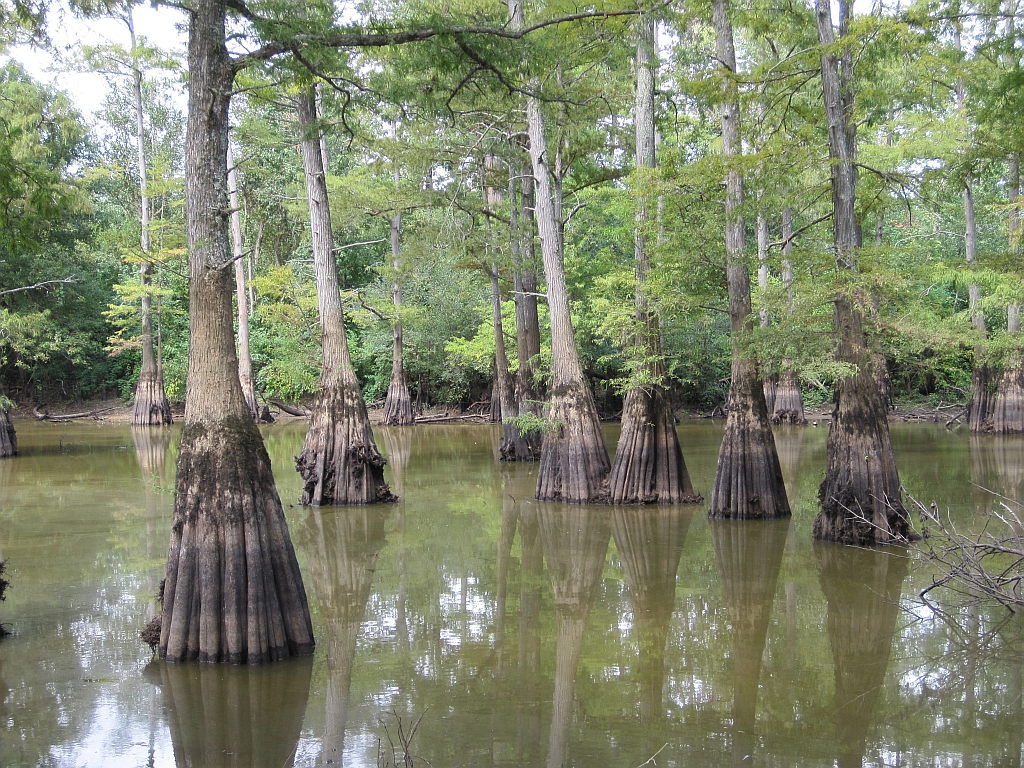
- Hatchie National Wildlife Refuge on September 17, 2011.

- Location within Tennessee Location within the United States
- Location: Haywood County, Tennessee, United States
- Nearest city: Brownsville, Tennessee
- Coordinates: 35°30′00″N 89°13′00″W
- Area: 11,556 acres (4,677 ha)
- Established: 1964
- Governing body: U.S. Fish and Wildlife Service
- Website: Hatchie National Wildlife Refuge

Hatchie National Wildlife Refuge is an area of swampy bottomland consisting of a portion of the floodplain of the Hatchie River in West Tennessee, covering 11,556 acres (4,677 hectares) in southern Haywood County, Tennessee. It is a rich environment for aquatic life and waterfowl. The refuge is bisected by Interstate 40 and hence almost all motor vehicle traffic between Nashville and Memphis passes through it. Wildlife includes fish, snakes, and mammals.
