= Panther Swamp National Wildlife Refuge =

United States National Wildlife Refuge in Mississippi

- IUCN category IV (habitat/species management area)
- Location within the United States
- Location: Yazoo County, Mississippi, United States
- Nearest city: Yazoo City, Mississippi
- Coordinates: 32°48′45″N 90°33′45″W
- Area: 38,697 acres (156.60 km^{2})
- Established: 1978
- Governing body: U.S. Fish and Wildlife Service
- Website: Panther Swamp National Wildlife Refuge

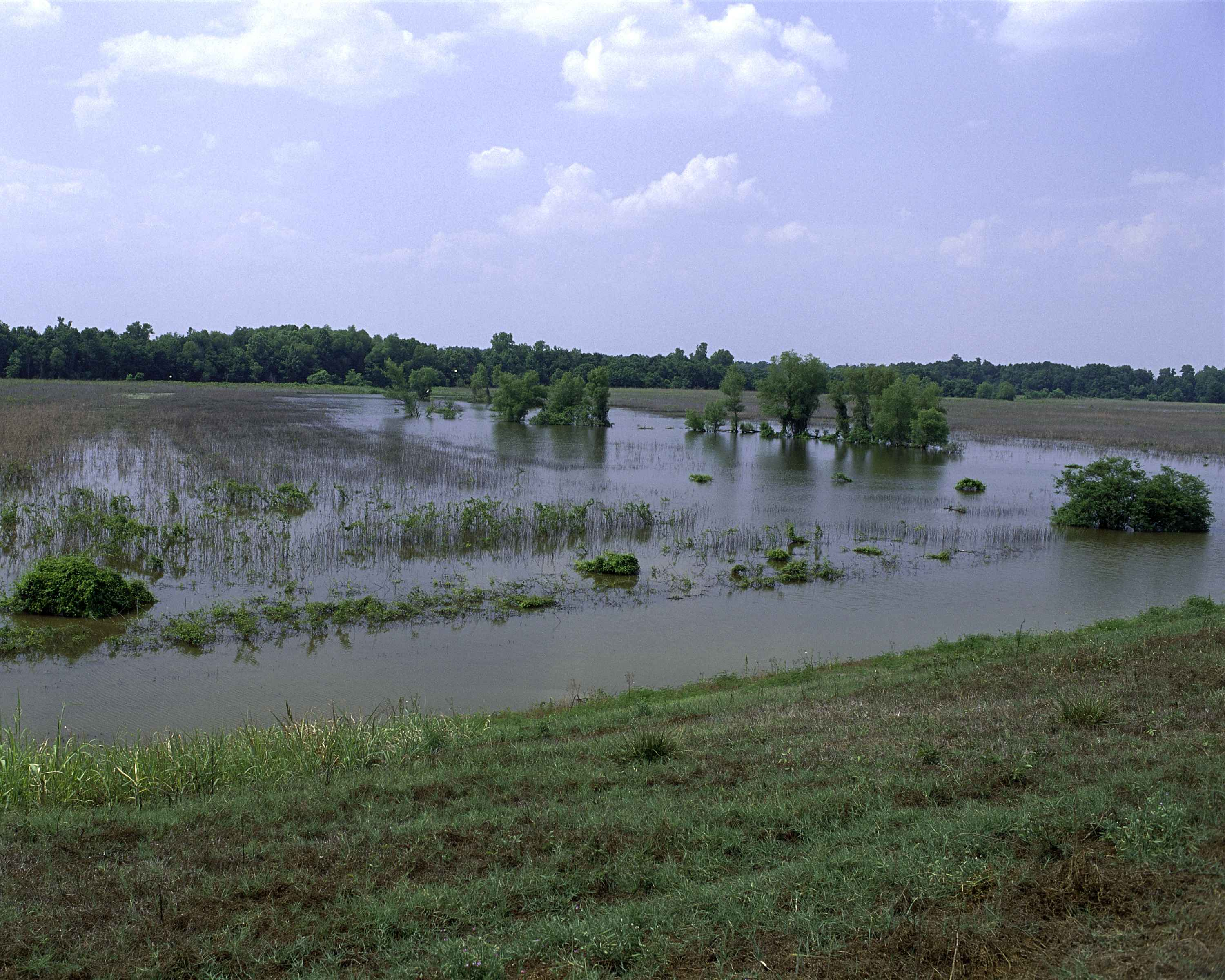
Panther Swamp National Wildlife Refuge

Panther Swamp National Wildlife Refuge is one of seven refuges in the Theodore Roosevelt National Wildlife Refuge Complex in Mississippi. Established in 1978, Panther Swamp National Wildlife Refuge encompasses 38,697 acres (156.60 km^{2}). Included in those acres is one of the largest blocks (21,000 acres) of bottomland forest in the lower Mississippi River alluvial floodplain. The upland areas or ridges often crest at no more than one foot above swamp areas, and contain nuttall, willow and water oaks and other species while overcup oak, bitter pecan and ash dominate the transition zone from swamp to upland. Additional habitat types consist of reforested and agricultural areas.

In addition to providing resting and feeding areas for over 100,000 wintering waterfowl annually, the refuge also provides habitat for 200 species of neotropical migratory songbirds. Resident species making their home among the woodlands, sloughs, and reforested areas include the American alligator, white-tail deer, otter, swamp rabbit, wild turkey, squirrel, and other various small fur-bearers such as mink and raccoon.
