= Hillside National Wildlife Refuge =

United States National Wildlife Refuge in Mississippi

- IUCN category IV (habitat/species management area)
- Location within the United States
- Location: Holmes County, Mississippi, United States
- Nearest city: Belzoni, Mississippi
- Coordinates: 33.05012°N 90.25425°W
- Area: 15,572 acres (63.02 km^{2})
- Established: 1975
- Governing body: U.S. Fish and Wildlife Service
- Website: Hillside National Wildlife Refuge

Hillside National Wildlife Refuge is one of seven refuges in the Theodore Roosevelt National Wildlife Refuge Complex. The refuge is an oasis of wildlife habitat surrounded by agriculture. Bounded on the east side by the unique loess bluffs of eastern Mississippi, this 15,572-acre (63.02 km^{2}) refuge was named to reflect its location at the base of the bluffs.

The refuge was established in 1975 and provides important stop-over and nesting habitat for over 225 species of neotropical migratory birds. The refuge is also known for large numbers of wintering waterfowl, at times exceeding 125,000 birds. Mallards, American wigeon, gadwall, northern shoveler, teal (bird), scaup, and ring-necked ducks traveling through the Mississippi Flyway stop by Hillside National Wildlife Refuge each winter. Breeding populations of wood ducks and hooded mergansers can be found throughout the refuge. Common shorebirds include killdeer, snipe, least and pectoral sandpipers, and greater and lesser yellowlegs. A wading bird rookery provides nesting and roosting habitat for several species of marsh and wading birds including white ibis; great, snowy, and cattle egrets; great blue, little blue, and green-backed herons; and yellow-crowned night herons. Raptors include the red-tailed hawk, northern harrier, American kestrel, and Mississippi kite.

Hillside also allows hunting of white-tailed deer, turkey, raccoon, squirrel, rabbit, and waterfowl.
