= Morgan Brake National Wildlife Refuge =

United States National Wildlife Refuge in Mississippi

- IUCN category IV (habitat/species management area)
- Location within the United States
- Location: Holmes County, Mississippi, United States
- Nearest city: Tchula, Mississippi
- Coordinates: 33°14′30″N 90°12′45″W
- Area: 7,383 acres (29.88 km^{2})
- Established: 1977
- Governing body: U.S. Fish and Wildlife Service
- Website: Morgan Brake National Wildlife Refuge

Morgan Brake National Wildlife Refuge is one of seven refuges in the Theodore Roosevelt National Wildlife Refuge Complex. In addition to the typical bottomland habitats of the Mississippi Delta, Morgan Brake National Wildlife Refuge includes a unique mile of north-facing loess bluffs on the east side of the refuge. This rare habitat with its unique floral assembly has been described by natural resources experts as the standard by which all loess bluffs can be judged.

The refuge is noted for large numbers of wintering waterfowl which have exceeded 100,000 ducks in recent years. Approximately 250 species of birds use the refuge, which is an important migration stop-over and also provides nesting habitat for many neotropical bird species. Hunting is offered for deer, ducks, squirrel, rabbit, and raccoon. Fishing is permitted in refuge waters north of Providence Road throughout the year except during the muzzleloader deer hunt.
