= Environmental history of China =

History of the natural environment and human interaction in China

The environmental history of China examines changes in the natural ecological landscape (environment) throughout Chinese history and the interactive relationship between successive generations of Chinese people and their environment. The degree to which China transformed and utilized nature was almost unmatched in the pre-modern world; the extent of environmental change was likely greater than that caused by any other country in the world, with the basic principle being the development of nature for human use.

The overall trend of the ecological environment in Chinese history has been one of continuous deterioration, with the pace of change accelerating over time. The most dramatic changes involved the disappearance of large areas of forest, followed by the reduction and desertification of grasslands, and the shrinkage or complete disappearance of freshwater lakes. As China's population grew, over 3,000 years of reclamation activities increased cultivated land area but caused extensive deforestation, leading to expanded desert areas and reduced lake surfaces, resulting in severe ecological degradation. The Chinese cleared forests and native vegetation, turning hillsides into terraces and valleys into farmland, built dikes and dams, redirected rivers, relocated lakes, and destroyed wildlife habitats for economic development. After such development and transformation, by the Qing dynasty, little "natural" untouched land remained. In the 20th century, the rise of industrialization and consumer culture accelerated changes in the natural environment.

From the Spring and Autumn and Warring States periods onward, early Chinese governments protected dwindling forest resources, sometimes to monopolize them. From the Tang to the early Qing, China was the most ecologically resilient and resource-rich country on Earth, and the most ecologically diverse polity. During the Tang, forested land gradually became privatized; by the Song, timber shortages emerged in parts of the lower Yangtze and western regions, leading people to begin afforestation. In the past 300 years, China has faced a forest crisis. From the 18th century, severe timber shortages occurred in many regions, including Lingnan; people focused on cultivating fast-growing tree species, sometimes selling immature trees for profit. Artificial afforestation gradually replaced most of the natural forests in southern China over the past millennium. Ancient China originally had many lakes, but later silted up and disappeared from the surface; the surface area of surviving lakes also shrank significantly compared to before.

From the mid-Ming onward, due to rapid population growth, the total environmental pressure exerted by the Chinese increased rapidly. During the Ming and Qing dynasties, as population surged, land resource shortages led to widespread reckless reclamation and deforestation, continuously reducing forest and lake areas and causing soil erosion. This ecological degradation led to increased floods and droughts in later historical periods. The most severe period of ecological deterioration in China was during the mid-Qing Qianlong and Jiaqing reigns (1736–1820), when grain yields per mu also declined. The growth of the agricultural population transformed most ecological landscapes into farmland, reducing opportunities to gather wild resources. Agricultural ecosystems are often far simpler than wild ones, generally relying on a few species and thus more vulnerable to droughts, pests, and other disasters. Wherever intensive agriculture advanced, wild animals such as elephants retreated.

== Prehistory ==
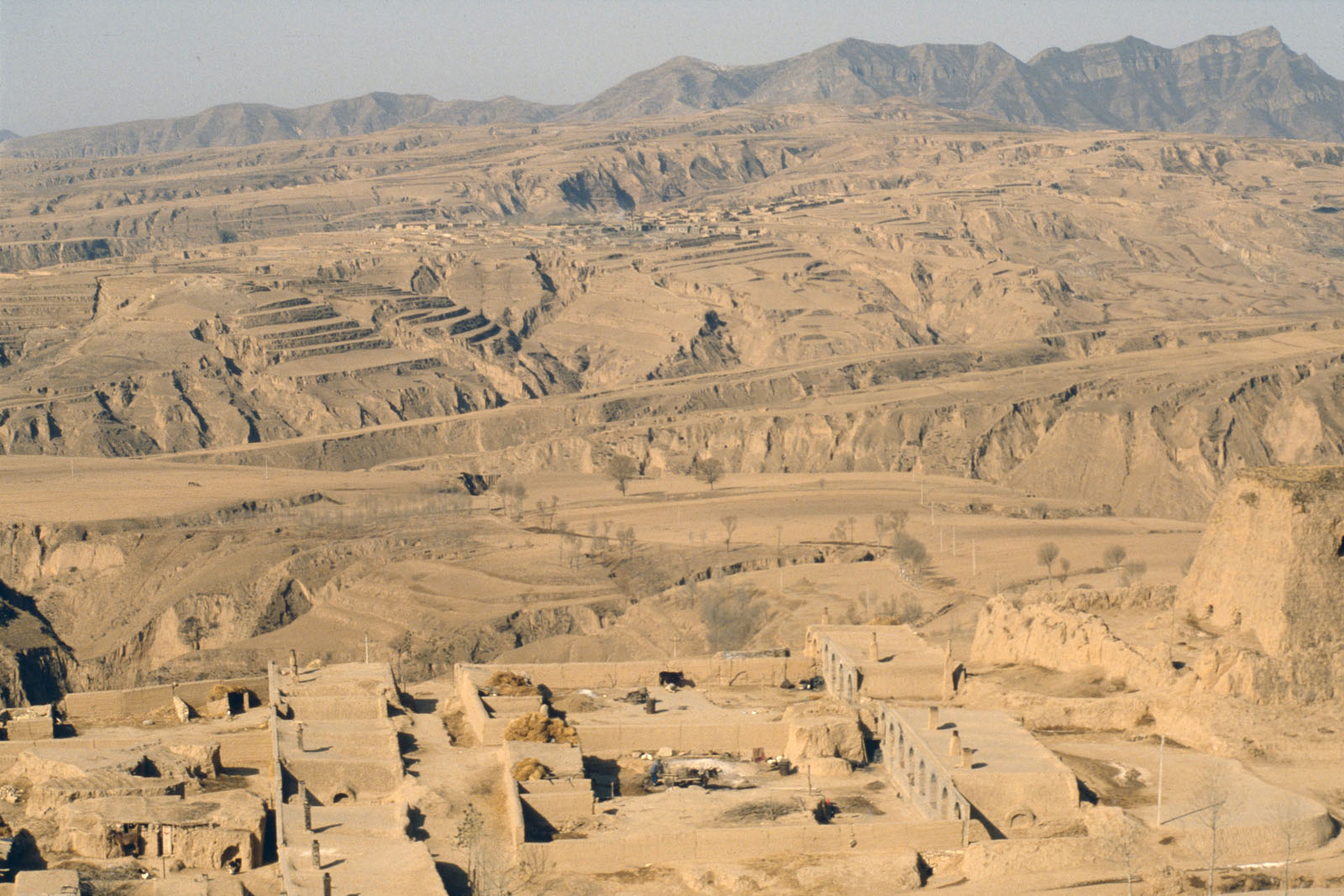
Landscape of the Loess Plateau, the cradle of Chinese agriculture

Before the development of agriculture, people hunted for a living or gathered food from forests, grasslands, or wetlands, with minimal impact on the environment. Hunter-gatherers may have used fire to clear underbrush in forests to allow new grass to grow, attracting deer herds for easier hunting, but the forests themselves remained. About 10,000 years ago, with the expansion of agriculture, forests began to give way to farmland. In the early Neolithic, people cultivated millet while also fishing, hunting, and gathering wild plants. Agriculture emerged almost simultaneously in northern and southern China: annual wild rice in the south and two types of millet in the north. Between 8,000 and 7,000 years ago, millet cultivation originated in the semi-arid savanna of the Wei River valley on the Loess Plateau. Before agricultural production, the area's original vegetation consisted of forests and grasslands, with about 30% forest cover. The loose, soft nature of loess soil on the Loess Plateau made it easiest to cultivate with primitive tools in early agriculture, so the Loess Plateau became the main region for early human agricultural development. In central and southern China, rice grew along riverbanks, ponds, or in freshwater marshes; wild rice was especially abundant around Dongting Lake, gathered by Neolithic people. By 5000 BCE, rice cultivation was widespread in the Yangtze River basin, Taiwan, and southern China, and settled agricultural communities became widespread and established in central and southern China.

Between 6000 and 5000 BCE, farmers in the Guanzhong region began burning land for cultivation. People did not continuously farm the same plot but cultivated each area for a few years, then left it fallow for several years before burning and replanting. With abundant land resources, villagers could practice long-term fallowing without needing to fertilize fields. Agricultural practices spread northward with migrating populations, then eastward into the forested Yellow River basin and North China Plain. Although the population was sparse, humans had already reduced animal diversity on the plains. In the forested mountainous areas west of Guanzhong, animal diversity was clearly higher than on the plains. Large fish became increasingly rare, and villagers shifted from using harpoons to more nets. As population grew, people overexploited huntable or gatherable resources, forcing greater reliance on grains. With agricultural development, people learned to cultivate more plants and domesticate more animals. Around 6000 BCE, wild boar in the Yellow and Yangtze River basins were domesticated into domestic pigs. Between 5000 and 3000 BCE, during the Yangshao culture period, people in the central Yellow River basin became heavily dependent on domesticated plants and animals. Increasing reliance on domesticated species such as cattle, sheep, and horses allowed exploitation of previously difficult drylands. Farmers initially cleared land by burning grass and used stone hoes and spades to turn the soil. As agriculture developed on the Loess Plateau, increasing use of fire and tillage led to soil erosion, increasing the sediment load carried by the Yellow River, which in turn raised the riverbed and banks, expanding the flood-prone area of the North China Plain.

Settled agriculture required clearing forests for farmland. Increased food supply from farming led to population growth, necessitating more land clearance. Yangshao people gradually developed methods to clear forests and open farmland. Initially, clearing a plot near the village sufficed, but over time, with technological advances and population pressure, more forests were destroyed. Using stone axes to fell trees was time-consuming and laborious, while burning entire forests was uncontrollable and dangerous. People employed a method of girdling individual trees—stripping a ring of bark from the trunk to block water and nutrients from the roots, allowing the tree to wither naturally. This allowed precise removal of specified numbers of trees. Villagers cleared most forests around settlements for firewood and cultivation, and wetlands also decreased. In the Yangtze River basin and Loess Plateau, two agricultural systems supported growing populations, leaving less pasture for livestock. However, Neolithic farmers never altered the environment on a large scale. By 2000 BCE, there were probably about 1,000 villages in northern China, each generally housing only a few hundred people and occupying small areas, leaving ample space for wild plants and animals.

== Shang dynasty ==
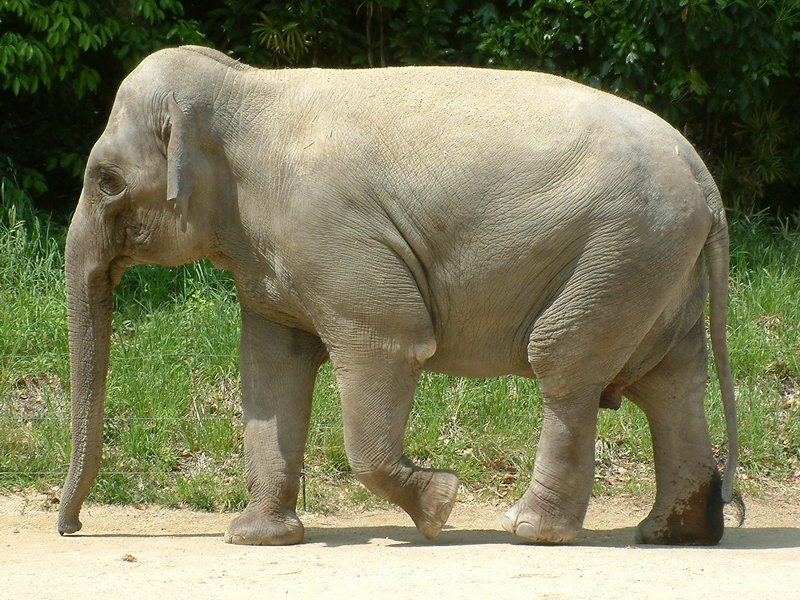
Asian elephant living in North China during the Shang dynasty

The Shang dynasty controlled vast territory and had a dense population. Its northwestern boundary roughly coincided with the modern 20-inch (50 cm) isohyet. West and north of this rainfall line were grasslands and deserts unsuitable for cultivation. Shang civilization's territory extended from deciduous broadleaf oak forests southward to the mixed deciduous and subtropical forests of the Yangtze River basin. Major crops included two types of millet, rice, and mulberry. They began transforming the North China Plain into farmland, but large forested areas still provided various game. Tigers, elephants, and rhinoceroses lived in the forests. Most of northern China remained dense forest, with only small patches of farmland. Approximately 4–5 million people lived on the North China Plain, with grain yields of about one shi per mu, implying that roughly 10,000 square kilometres (4,000 sq mi) to 13,000 square kilometres (5,000 sq mi) of oak forest had been cleared. Cleared land was usually located within forests to facilitate hunting. Around major cities such as Anyang, the surrounding countryside was largely cleared for farmland. Shang people cleared forests tree by tree rather than burning entire tracts, to avoid danger and waste fuel. Oracle bone inscriptions also record forest burning, often related to hunting. Burning could clear native vegetation for farming; fires could drive wild animals from forests for easier capture; and burning could drive away birds and beasts, providing safety for cultivators and protecting crops from trampling.

The Shang established walled cities and entered the Bronze Age. Bronze casting required burning large quantities of wood for mining, smelting, and casting, greatly affecting the surrounding environment. When forests were exhausted, the mines were abandoned; after copper and tin reached the capital's foundries, even more wood was needed for refining. The Shang center was located between the flood-prone plains and the relatively well-drained area near the Taihang Mountains. Capitals frequently relocated because the Shang practiced shifting cultivation; after several years, soil fertility declined and yields dropped. At that time, people lacked good farming tools and could only use ash from burned vegetation as fertilizer. Without plowing with spades or plows, they relied only on the surface layer of fertility. Within a few years, the soil was exhausted, yields declined, and farmers had to migrate to open new fields. This was the long-term fallow system of primitive agriculture. The Shang had vast hunting grounds west and south of Mount Tai. Shang people hunted not only gentle game such as deer, foxes, wolves, and badgers but also large animals such as elephants, tigers, and rhinoceroses. In the densely populated lowlands of Henan, farmland and domestic grazing animals gradually occupied the habitats of large mammals, and human herds gradually replaced native animal populations. The expansion of domestic herds reduced land available for wild animals, leading to the extinction of aurochs and wild horses, and making the region the first in East Asia where large animals permanently disappeared. By the late 2nd millennium BCE, large wild mammals had largely vanished from the North China lowlands and survived only in sparsely populated surrounding mountainous areas.

== Zhou dynasty ==
=== Western Zhou ===
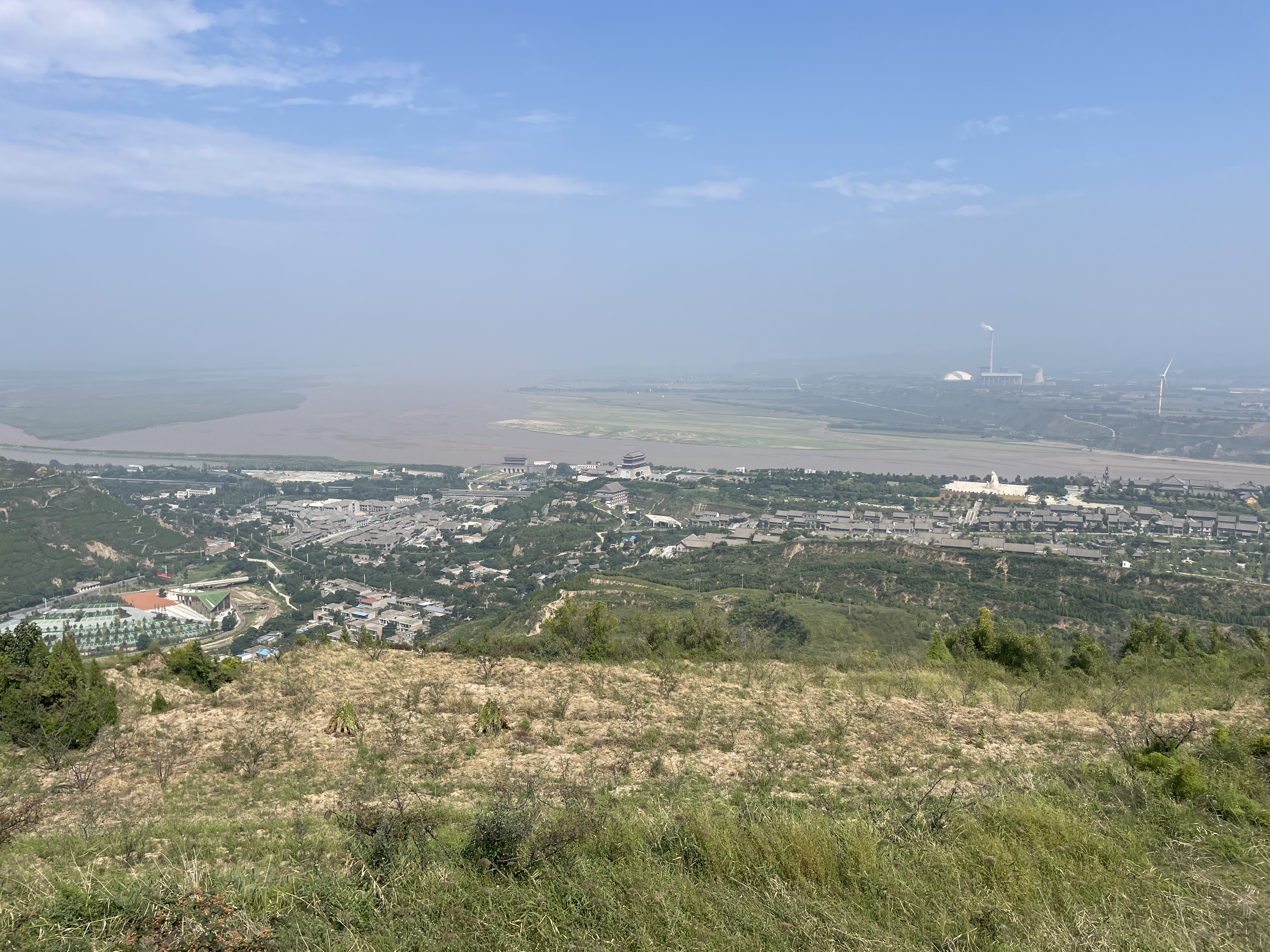
Modern view of the Wei River flowing through the Western Zhou royal domain

The core area of the Western Zhou was the Wei River valley, where dryland agriculture first developed in China. Loess soil was easy to cultivate and could be planted year after year. Zhou agriculture gradually advanced from long-term shifting fallow to short-term rotational fallow on the same land, often using a three-year cycle: fallow for two years, allowing wild grass and shrubs to grow, then burning the secondary vegetation and using its ash as fertilizer before replanting and beginning the next cycle. Most of the burned "forests" at this stage were on flatlands rather than in mountainous areas. The Wei River provided fresh water for the Zhou, while timber for construction and heating came from the Qinling Mountains to the south. Under the feudal system, Zhou people cleared forests to open farmland on enfeoffed lands. With walled towns as central points, they burned forest land layer by layer, expanding farmland according to population needs. Beyond the agricultural zone, wild grass and secondary shrubs were allowed to grow as pasture, while the outermost areas remained unburned forest serving as defensive barriers and territorial boundaries. At the same time, the Zhou drove nomadic peoples from the grasslands of the Loess Plateau and opened them for cultivation and farming. When arable land was insufficient, they cleared forests in hilly areas.

In the early Western Zhou, large areas of uncultivated land still existed on the North China Plain and in the Wei River valley. Forest clearance expanded eastward, northeastward, and northwestward from the Shang core on the North China Plain. The eastern Yellow River alluvial plain was flat and densely forested. Because the Yellow River flooded periodically, the area was originally unsuitable for farming or building cities, so settlements were built on higher ground north and south of the river channel. The Zhou used stone or wooden plows to open land, pulled by human labor or oxen. Loess soil was highly susceptible to erosion, so the Zhou built ridges in fields to reduce soil loss. The Zhou did not revere forests and made no effort to protect them. As forests and grasslands disappeared on the Loess Plateau, sediment runoff increased and the Yellow River gradually turned yellow. The Zhou gradually developed the idea that humans should dominate and control nature, that the correct natural order should be governed by humans, and that wild animals should be driven away. By around 1000 BCE, the range of elephants no longer extended across China but had retreated southward to the Huai River basin.

=== Spring and Autumn period ===
Under the early feudal system, fiefs occupied certain territories, while remaining land belonged to no one. Mountains, forests, rivers, and marshes were originally open public spaces. By the Eastern Zhou, as state control expanded, governments appointed officials to tax resource exploitation in remote areas. To enrich the state and strengthen the military, rulers monopolized mountains, forests, rivers, and marshes and imposed tariffs. During the Spring and Autumn period, land belonged to the ruler; under feudalism, famous mountains and great marshes within feudal states belonged to the Son of Heaven. Utilization of mountain, forest, river, and marsh resources was limited by time but not by users. Benefits from these resources were shared between rulers and the people, but use had to occur within specified times. Feudal states attached great importance to forest protection, with strict forestry laws. Because population was sparse and land abundant, the incentive for people to destroy forests was not strong. After the mid-Spring and Autumn period, rulers turned mountains, forests, and marshes into private property and taxed those who used their resources. This was equivalent to indirect prohibition through taxation. Forestry laws prevented reckless felling, and mountain and forest access for harvesting was seasonal. Entering mountains to harvest beyond the permitted period or felling trees that should not be cut was called "stealing wood" and subject to punishment. Some forests were completely closed, with even harsher penalties for violations. The southern state of Chu had more forests than the central states. By the 6th century BCE, forests had become very scarce in the coastal area of northeastern Shandong. Around 500 BCE, iron tools began to appear and were soon used in agriculture and for making iron plows. The first to use iron farming tools were the state of Wu.

=== Warring States period ===
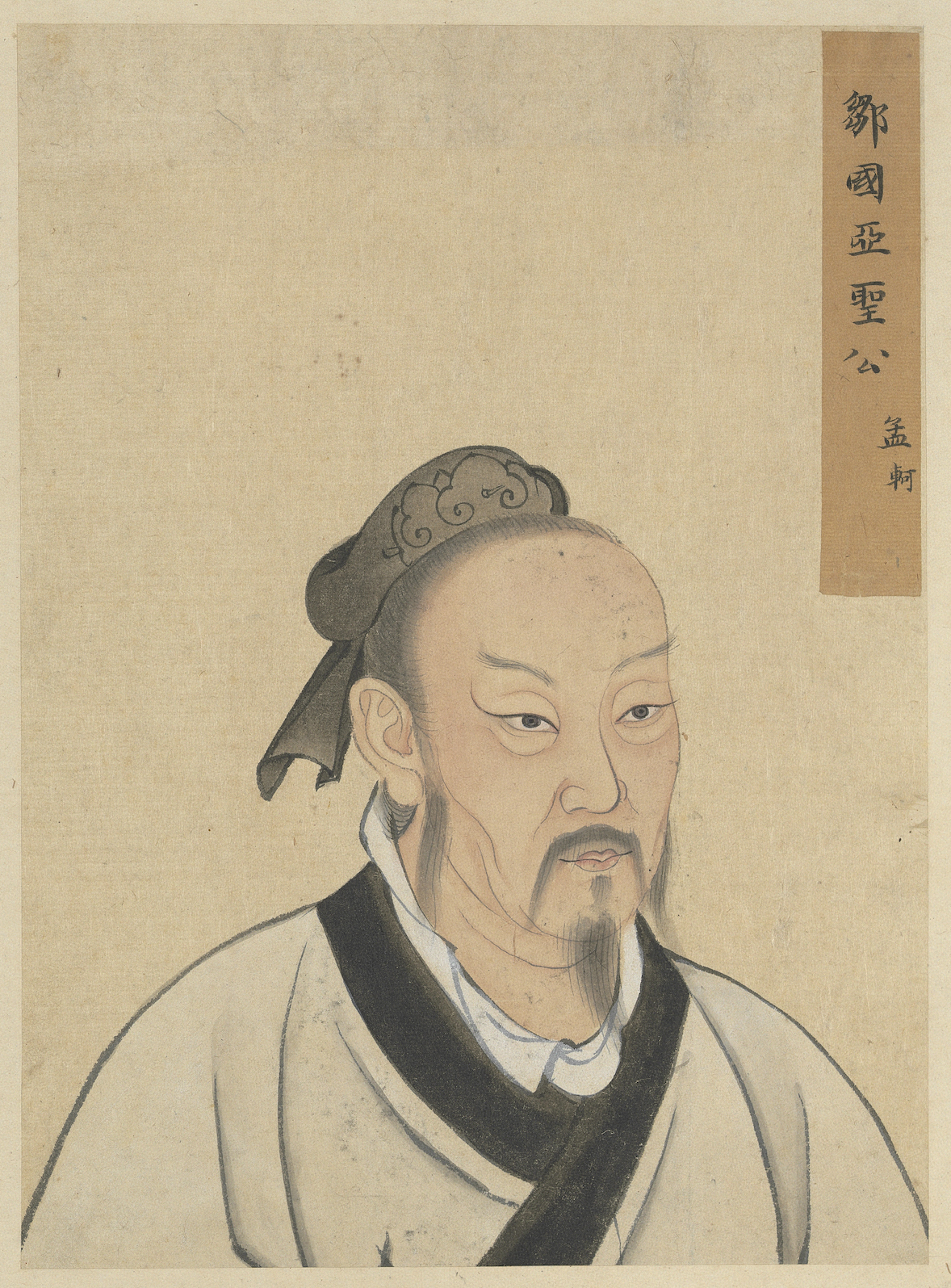
Mencius, who noted the denuded Ox Mountain

By the 4th century BCE, iron-smelting technology had spread widely in the Yangtze River basin, and northern feudal states began mass-producing iron tools. Iron foundries required large amounts of wood to make charcoal for smelting ore; wood was scarcer than ore, so large-scale deforestation and environmental destruction became common. In densely populated areas, all woodland around cities had disappeared, and farmland of the various feudal states adjoined one another. Due to excessive timber cutting, areas near the capitals of large states became bare Ox Mountain. By around 300 BCE, people had thoroughly altered the land of North China. Mencius criticized the felling of Ox Mountain's forests. To increase revenue, rulers of the various states opened wastelands and forests for farmland to recruit farmers, attract migrants, and expand the agricultural population. During the Warring States period, digging irrigation canals was common practice. For example, the state of Qin built the Zhengguo Canal, diverting water from the Jing River into the Luo River over 126 km to irrigate and flush salts from saline-alkali land between the Jing and Luo, turning wasteland into fertile fields. This completed agricultural reclamation in the Guanzhong region. The Warring States competed to control forests, wetlands, and minerals, appointing officials to manage and tax them to strengthen state power. The Shang Yang reforms made the benefits of mountains, forests, rivers, and marshes the exclusive property of the ruler and established officials to collect taxes on them. The state took control of forests and marshes that had once been communal resources, thereby exercising far greater control over the natural ecology within its territory than ever before.

In the eastern part of the Guanzhong Basin, soil erosion began to intensify due to agricultural expansion. In the densely populated areas of the North China Plain, pastures within farming regions became increasingly scarce; the growing population encroached upon the living space of herbivorous livestock such as cattle and sheep, leaving only animals like dogs, pigs, and chickens—which could survive in human settlements—behind . The Zhou people developed wetlands along riverbanks and in poorly drained areas, causing the deer and water deer—two species that inhabited these wetlands—to eventually disappear from the Yellow River basin. As farmland expanded, deer herds in the lowlands dwindled, and most of the remaining land was used for grazing cattle, sheep, and goats. By the end of the Warring States period, large wild animals in the North China Plain were few and far between, and aurochs, wild horses, and wild water buffalo eventually became extinct. From then on, large animals in the North China Plain were found only in the royal game reserves. The three northern states of Qin, Zhao, and Yan expanded northward, occupying semi-arid farming and pastoral zones, then advancing further into nomadic territories. They drove nomadic peoples from their pastures and built the Great Wall to defend against their attacks. The Central Plains states needed resources from the grasslands, especially horses for cavalry and pasture for grazing. Facing incursions from the Central Plains, the Xiongnu formed alliances to resist.

During the Warring States period, people gradually realized that nature's bounty was not limitless and needed timely maintenance to prevent resource depletion and food shortages. Mencius emphasized land management, advocating soil and water conservation measures and urging the royal family and wealthy to live moderately to avoid exhausting resources. The Guanzi, compiled around 250 BCE, pointed out that natural resources were finite and that successful rulers should strictly limit resource exploitation to prevent exhaustion. However, due to the pressures of war, resource protection policies rarely succeeded in the various states.

== Qin and Han dynasties ==
=== Central Plains ===
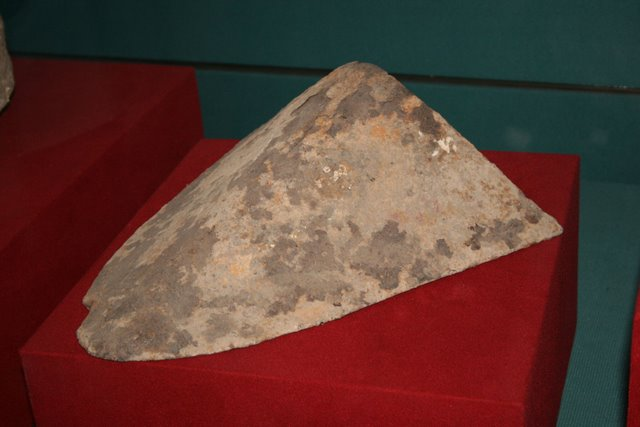
Iron plow artifact from the Han dynasty

The agricultural empire model created by the Qin and Han became the way most Chinese dynasties organized the state for the next two thousand years. The Qin government undertook massive projects. To supply timber for building palaces in Xianyang and the Great Wall, forests in the Inner Mongolian Plateau and nearby mountains were destroyed. The Qin also developed forests in the south. Convict laborers were used to fell forests in the upper reaches of the Han River basin. The Qin-Han government built roads connecting the entire empire, promoting agricultural development in the south, southwest, and northwest. More and more land was altered by humans. During the Han, agricultural production increased on the North China Plain and the population grew significantly. By 2 CE, the national population reached 60 million, and natural ecosystems were replaced by agricultural ones. Han people knew how to plow with iron plows and fertilize with manure, eliminating the need for fallowing to restore fertility. The extensive slash-and-burn system of rough cultivation almost completely disappeared. The expansion of farmland destroyed large areas of forest on the North China Plain. By the mid-Han, forests on the North China Plain had been largely felled, with only the Taihang and Qinling Mountains retaining forest cover. The once-forested hills of the Shandong Peninsula were planted with economic trees such as fruit trees. The previously diverse human settlements and natural environments of northern China had now become homogenized. Iron foundries continued to destroy forests. In the Western Han, there was a case where an iron foundry, having exhausted the trees on nearby hillsides, caused a hillside collapse that buried over a hundred people.

The state of Qin monopolized mountain and forest management. After unifying the six states, it ordered the entire empire to "not fell grass or trees." It enacted laws restricting reckless exploitation of natural resources to protect the empire's resources for regeneration. The Qin had officials responsible for managing forests and marshes. They were to respond to fires, illegal logging, and over-hunting of wild animals. The state gradually took control of mountainous areas and regulated and taxed tree planting and forestry. Laws declared mountains and marshes state property and did not allow long-term private occupation. Agriculture did not need to expand into mountainous areas. Ordinary farmers could not freely enter mountains, marshes, or forests. The Qin and Han governments also enacted laws prohibiting woodcutting in specified months. Rulers also designated imperial hunting parks closed to felling and entry year-round, the largest of which was the Shanglin Park south of Chang'an. After the Han salt and iron monopolies, prohibitions on mountains and marshes became stricter, but periodic openings for public harvesting were still allowed. In special circumstances, the government would temporarily lift restrictions for short periods. The First Emperor of Qin had a vast imperial hunting park beside Xianyang, and Emperor Wu of Han built an even larger Shanglin Park connected to Chang'an. These parks resembled nature reserves, containing mountains and water, wild animals, rare plants, and palaces. People realized that unrestrained harvesting brought adverse consequences for wild food sources. The Qin and Han governments also implemented environmental protection measures, enacting laws called "Monthly Ordinances" that prohibited drying up ponds or burning mountain forests. However, people did not strictly observe them, believing that agricultural development was far more important than environmental protection.

=== Northwest ===
To attack the Xiongnu, Emperor Wu of Han mobilized over 12.5 million people, destroying the Xiongnu and five Central Asian kingdoms. Han soldiers advanced into the Central Asian interior and the edge of the Gobi Desert. The Central Plains originally had little pasture suitable for raising animals. To build a cavalry, Emperor Wu established 36 pastures on the western and northern frontiers, dispatching about 30,000 slaves to tend horses. To completely solve the Xiongnu problem, Emperor Wu wanted to turn the occupied Xiongnu lands from grassland into farmland, cultivated and settled by Han people. Up to a million Han people were relocated from the North China Plain to the Hexi Corridor and from there expanded into the Tarim Basin. The colonization and grassland transformation plan was quite meticulous. First, military watchtowers were built, followed by garrison towns near water sources and arable land. Military and civilian personnel turned the area into farmland, then built houses equipped with furniture and farm tools, settled the relocated Han people, and began cultivation. As colonization and military farming progressed, military rule gave way to civil administration, and the entire region was incorporated into Han territory. Emperor Wu stationed troops in the Hexi region while also relocating civilians to strengthen the border, establishing the Four Commanderies of Hexi and 35 counties, greatly increasing the local population.

Emperor Wu's management of Hexi and the tuntian policy accelerated the deterioration of Hexi's geographical and ecological environment. In the early Han, animal husbandry flourished in the Gansu Corridor, with vast grasslands and small deserts. Most of the Hexi Corridor was originally grassland oasis with abundant water and grass, and the Qilian Mountains had extensive forests. The tuntian areas were located on the edge of the desert, where forests were already sparse. Tuntian activities did not expand windbreak forests but instead first cut down trees. Sometimes excessive water use in upstream tuntian areas affected downstream water supply, causing rivers to change course. Original oases became desolate and disappeared, eventually turning into desert. Examples include Luotuo in Gaotai County and Suoyang City in Anxi, both harmed by artificial river course changes, with land gradually desertifying. The wild grass vegetation on the desert edge originally served as a natural barrier against wind and sand. Crops, however, left large gaps between plants, making it difficult to block wind and sand. Moreover, crops were harvested in autumn, leaving the ground completely bare for about half the year, precisely when wind and sand were strongest. Tuntian farmland had no vegetation to block wind and sand, leading to desert encroachment. Even more unfortunately, when the Han dynasty's national strength weakened and the policy of relocating civilians to strengthen the border was halted, people withdrew from the tuntian areas. The former tuntian zones became large areas of abandoned land with long-term bare ground. Without even the weak wind and sand blocking effect of crops, strong winds carried large amounts of sand particles deep inland, causing the desert to expand year by year. Plowed grasslands began to suffer wind erosion and desertification, bringing lasting environmental damage and species extinction. When farmland lost Han maintenance and water sources, former grassland areas turned into desert rather than naturally reverting to grassland. In the Tarim Basin, the Han developed oases rather than grasslands, a method that was more sustainable in the long term.

=== River management ===
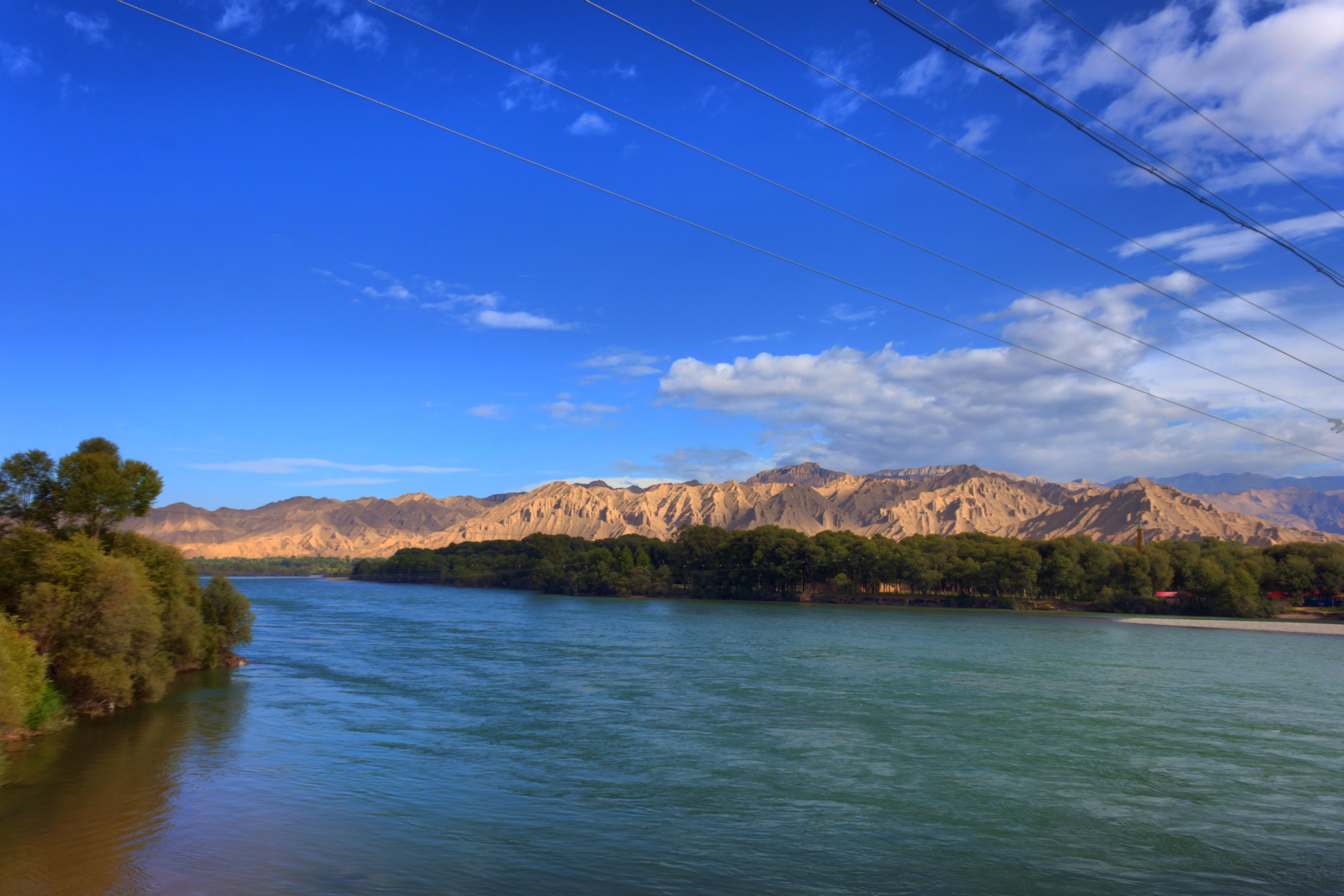
Upper reaches of the Yellow River in Qinghai Province

During the Western Han, to develop agriculture, grasslands along the middle reaches of the Yellow River were cleared; to meet the capital's demand for timber, temperate forests in the upper reaches of the Yellow River were felled, resulting in soil erosion. Land around the Yellow River basin had already been cleared for agriculture and smelting. Large amounts of yellow sediment entered the river. The Yellow River water was said to contain about 60% sediment. The river turned yellow and began to be called the "Yellow" River. In winter, when river flow slowed, sediment accumulated in the riverbed, raising it every year at an average rate of about 0.91 metres (3 ft) per century, increasing the risk of flooding. Between 186 BCE and 153 CE, Yellow River dikes breached approximately every 16 years. Major breaches occurred in 168 BCE, 131 BCE, 39 BCE, and 29 BCE. In 11 CE, a historic breach occurred, causing the Yellow River to change course.

=== South ===
During the Han, people rarely developed the south because the hot, humid climate was unsuitable for the grains (millet, barley, wheat) grown by northern Han people, and the many deadly diseases native to the south also deterred northerners. At that time, the Han had not yet learned how to transform the south's wet environment into high-yield rice paddies. In the lowlands of Lingnan, the Zhuang people cultivated rice, farming the same land year after year, while the Yao living in hilly areas practiced shifting slash-and-burn cultivation. The Li on the coast and Hainan Island practiced even more casual grain cultivation.

== Wei, Jin, Northern and Southern dynasties ==
=== North ===
The disaster of Yongjia in 311 caused a massive population decline in the north, with large numbers of Han people migrating south to the Yangtze River basin to escape chaos. Northern China experienced wave after wave of nomadic invasions, while many Han people retreated to mountain forts (wubao). During the 4th–5th centuries, there were hundreds of forts in northern China. With sparse population and large areas of abandoned land, both Han and non-Han rulers tried to resettle farmers on the fields. Invaders tried to capture Han farmers and confine them to secure zones they controlled, concentrating them near the conquerors' capitals. After people were taken away, the occupied land was abandoned. Mark Elvin noted that due to the southward movement of pastoralists, grasslands and forests in North China regenerated, and Yellow River breaches decreased to once every 50 years or less. Robert Marks, however, argues that northern forests did not regenerate or recover because most had already been felled during the Han, leaving almost no seed sources. Troops constantly marched through the land, making it difficult even for shrubs to grow. Nomadic peoples brought grazing animals, turning former Han farmland into pastures for millions of horses and sheep. Sheep grazed plants bare, inhibiting the regeneration of trees and shrubs. The range of tigers shrank dramatically as their habitats and food sources were destroyed, leading them to begin attacking humans and eating people.

=== South ===
During the chaos of the Yongjia Disaster, hundreds of thousands to a million Han people fled south to the Yangtze River basin and even further to the South China Sea (Guangzhou). Han people drove out southern natives and settled there. Southern land was densely covered with rivers and lakes, with dense forests covering hills and mountains, originally unsuitable for agriculture. The Yangtze Delta and Hangzhou Bay areas were still uninhabitable. (During the Warring States, the state of Yue settled on higher hills, slopes, or alluvial fans rather than in swamps and low river valleys.) The lowlands were filled with brackish water, with fluctuating water areas and levels. People on higher plains could farm, while those in low plains and coastal sandy areas engaged in salt production and fishing. At that time, aristocratic families from the lower Yangtze began investing large amounts of labor and resources to gradually transform southern land into rice paddies, replacing forests and swamps with farmland. To ensure rice growth, the Han needed to level the land thoroughly before cultivation, build dikes around fields, and install sluice gates for drainage and irrigation. The Han were able to drain and tame low-lying land. The entire Yangtze River basin's river valleys were transformed, and beyond rice paddies, flood-control dikes were built, massively altering the south's wet environment. In the lower Yangtze, new settlements were located on lower plains and river valleys suitable for rice cultivation, with dense mountain forests between fields inhabited by non-Han "Man," "Lao," "Li," and "Xi" peoples whose lifestyles had not yet been assimilated by the Han.

During the Eastern Jin, powerful families seized mountains, lakes, rivers, and marshes. Great clans illegally occupied mountains and marshes. In 336, the Eastern Jin issued a strict prohibition against occupying mountains and marshes, known as the "Renchen Regulation." However, it was difficult to enforce effectively, resulting in powerful families violating the law by occupying mountains and sealing waters, while the government was powerless to punish them. Common people had no such privileges, creating extreme unfairness. Because it was difficult to strictly prohibit powerful families from occupying mountains and sealing waters, during the reign of Emperor Xiaowu of Liu Song (453–464), the regulation was changed. While reaffirming that occupying mountains and marshes was an encroachment on state-owned land, it recognized existing private property as a fait accompli. This allowed private individuals to legally own mountains and marshes, but with limits based on official rank. From then on, mountain and forest property rights in the Southern Dynasties operated under a dual-track system of state and private ownership. Private individuals could legally acquire mountain and forest property rights. Open access to mountains and forests became the norm, with strict closures being special cases. With private ownership of mountains and forests permitted, in suitable areas people transformed occupied mountain land into terraces for water storage and rice planting; in unsuitable mountainous areas, they turned them into millet fields, continuing the early slash-and-burn fallow system.

=== West ===
In the 4th century, Lao tribes appeared in northern Sichuan. They lived in lowlands along rivers and practiced shifting cultivation, burning part of the forest and planting taro and millet in the ashes until the soil's nutrients were exhausted after a few years, then moving to the next forest patch. The Lao were forced by the Han to leave the lowlands; some retreated to the mountains, while most chose to adapt to Han life. In the highlands of Sichuan, the Yi lived in fortified villages on mountain tops. To provide pasture for their livestock, they burned forests in the mountains. Later, as the Yi population grew and they moved into lowland forests, they still practiced slash-and-burn agriculture. When competing with the Han for land, the Yi would retreat to their mountain-top fortresses.

== Sui and Tang dynasties ==
=== North ===
During the Tang, forests in the north had been largely felled. During the Sui and Tang, the Zhongnan Mountains could generally only supply the capital's daily firewood needs. Even so, after the mid-Tang, even firewood began to fall short, and larger construction timber had to be obtained from prefectures such as Lan and Sheng. To protect Chang'an from soil erosion from surrounding hills and to raise awareness of natural environmental protection, the Tang issued laws. Perhaps influenced by Buddhist precepts against killing, the Tang also enacted laws restricting killing and hunting seasons. People recognized the serious consequences of forest degradation but could do little to save China's forests. To supply fuel, large numbers of trees planted along Chang'an's main roads were felled. During the mid-Tang, all accessible pine trees in present-day Shandong, Shanxi (Taihang Mountains), and Shaanxi had been felled, mainly to burn pine smoke for ink production. As the riverbed continued to rise, dikes were built along both banks of the Yellow River during the Tang, and the soil for raising the dikes was dug from nearby areas, increasing the height difference between nearby land and the river. Seepage turned many low-lying areas into swamps, and because salts in the water could not drain away, a belt about 3.2 kilometres (2 mi) wide along the river became uncultivable saline-alkali land.

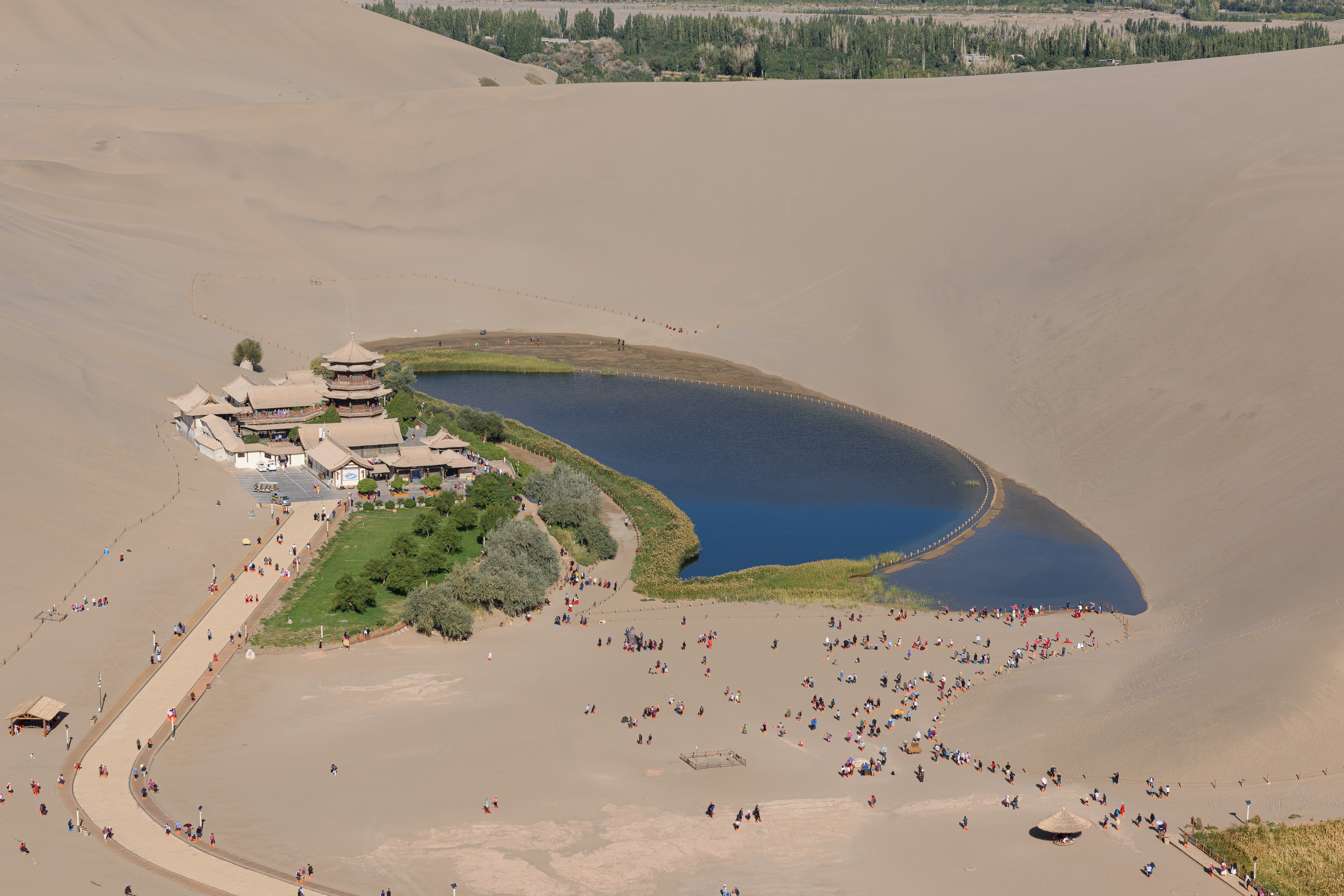
Crescent Lake oasis near Dunhuang

During the Tang, the Hexi Corridor became a major transportation route and part of the Silk Road. As population increased, suitable land was colonized and turned into farmland, resulting in desert expansion and shrinkage of the Dunhuang oasis. The desertification process was irreversible. During the Tang, Buddhist monasteries also altered the natural environment. Monasteries were generally built in uncultivated mountainous or hilly areas or other unused land. During the Sui, there were over 4,000 large monasteries distributed across north and south China, each overseeing large numbers of farmers and servants who cultivated land for them. Monasteries were also surrounded by trees, gardens, and pastures. They cleared mountainous land for farmland, pastures, orchards, and timber forests, transforming original forests into various productive arbor or shrub forests, such as tea gardens and orchards (orange trees were most common), and planted construction materials such as timber and bamboo.

=== Jiangnan ===
In the Yangtze Delta region, Han rice cultivation was mostly limited to higher elevations. By the 9th century, the Han had invented new water control techniques and began effectively reclaiming low-lying areas. At that time, the main problem facing farmers was flooding. Annual monsoon rains caused major floods in the Yangtze, overflowing riverbanks across the middle and lower reaches into plains, lakes, and marshlands. The Han solved this with polder fields (weitian)—completely enclosing farmland with earthen dikes to prevent floodwater entry. Sluice gates in the dikes allowed drainage and irrigation. The level of farmland inside the dikes was lower than the surrounding floodwater or river water, enabling farmers to have ample irrigation water while preventing floods. However, building polder fields exceeded the capacity of individual households and was often completed by wealthy landlords. Tang farmers also popularized the method of raising fish in rice paddies, allowing fish to eat weeds and mosquito larvae while fish manure increased field fertility.

During the Tang (and subsequent Song, Yuan, Ming, and Qing), people practiced slash-and-burn cultivation on mountainous land, called "she tian." Before sowing, trees had to be felled, along with shrubs and tall grass. She tian did not use plows or turn the soil and was an extensive cultivation method. After felling trees, people waited for rain before burning the grass and wood on the ground. After the rain, while the ashes were still warm, they sowed seeds without irrigation. The crops planted were dryland ones such as millet or glutinous millet. This extensive cultivation method could not maintain soil fertility and required shifting fallow. Some moved annually, others after two or three years of planting. After leaving, the original land needed seven or eight years to regrow trees and wild grass before slash-and-burn could be repeated. In mountainous areas where she tian prevailed, there was a special group called "she tian fu" who owned no land themselves but specialized in traveling to perform slash-and-burn work for others. They would agree in advance on work for a certain family's she tian. Although she tian fu might travel hundreds of li to arrive on schedule, they brought their own tools.

=== Lingnan and southeastern coast ===
Both the Sui and Tang dynasties sent armies south to Lingnan and colonized the area, clashing with the indigenous peoples. In the waterlogged swamps, the air was very humid, and parasites and mosquitoes proliferated in large numbers. Standing water on the ground and swamps left after river floods allowed Anopheles mosquitoes and malaria to thrive in Lingnan. To northern Han people, the entire Lingnan region was plagued by epidemics, with miasma (malaria) prevalent. Tropical forests were breeding grounds for various parasites. Lingnan's miasma kept the Han out of the low river valleys. At that time, most Han settled in northern Guangdong and Guangxi, where there was no miasma threat, while the Dai indigenous people living in the lower river regions had some degree of immunity to malaria. In multiple Han military campaigns against indigenous peoples, one-quarter of the troops were lost to malaria. Huang Chao's forces also suffered 30–40% mortality from malaria before withdrawing from Lingnan and moving north. The Han were helpless against miasma, and western Lingnan and further west in Yunnan remained under indigenous control. More thorough environmental change in southern China would have to wait until the Han population became larger and denser.

During the Tang, most of Lingnan was still covered by forest, but the original deciduous broadleaf forests on the highlands had been burned and replaced by secondary coniferous and fir forests. At that time, the lower reaches of the West, North, and East Rivers were all densely marshy and difficult to cultivate. Indigenous Tai-speaking groups cultivated rice in the lowlands, farming the same land year after year, while the Li, Miao, and Yao in higher mountainous areas practiced shifting slash-and-burn cultivation. They used slash-and-burn methods, constantly migrating, combining agriculture with hunting and gathering. The Moyao people hunted in highland forests after the autumn harvest, burning wild grass to promote new growth and attract deer herds for hunting. The Han did the same with slash-and-burn. In the dry winter months, they burned forests on mountain slopes, then many families together sowed seeds in the ashes, harvesting for a few years before moving to another plot and establishing a new settlement, allowing the original exhausted plot to regrow vegetation. In higher mountainous areas, especially along the watershed between the Yangtze and West Rivers, forests were often cleared to plant tea. Unlike annual crops, tea bushes provided a certain degree of soil protection. Highland residents also used girdling, topping, and felling to clear mountain forests, opening clearings in dense tree canopies to allow sunlight to reach the ground for planting tuber crops such as taro. Slash-and-burn cultivation in the upper reaches of rivers caused erosion in mountainous areas, sending more sediment into the lower reaches of the Xi, Bei, and Dong Rivers, depositing it in the floodplains of the Xi, Bei, and Dong Rivers and becoming fertile soil, while also bringing problems of flooding and malaria.

In the Fujian region, the indigenous Yue people spoke Austronesian languages and primarily lived by fishing and hunting, possibly also practicing slash-and-burn rice cultivation. Many places in southern Fujian were saltwater marshes and habitats for saltwater crocodiles. Inland mountains blocked Han entry into the region, so Han arrival on the southeastern coast came much later than in Lingnan. By the 8th century, Han immigration to Fujian began to increase. Locals built river dams and developed rice paddies. The Han not only battled the environment and saltwater crocodiles but also used military force to drive the Yue from the valleys. The Tang established tuntian to control the area. Many indigenous people fled to the mountains, while the remainder accepted Han assimilation. Both the Yue and saltwater crocodiles disappeared, replaced by the Han and their farmland.

== Song dynasty ==
=== North ===
From the Song onward, ecological conditions in the south and north changed relatively. The northern ecosystem gradually deteriorated, with massive forest reduction. The ground lost its temperature-regulating function, average annual temperatures dropped, and the frost-free period shortened, reducing the growing season for crops. At the same time, rainfall also decreased, turning the north into a semi-arid region. After severe destruction of natural vegetation, soil erosion intensified. Combined with the loose soil of the Loess Plateau, which was easily eroded, most rivers in the north had increased sediment loads, causing siltation and flooding, especially the Yellow River, which gradually became an "elevated river." Its lower reaches frequently changed course. Lakes on the northern plains were successively filled in, eliminating their natural flood storage and detention functions and causing frequent floods. During the same period, the south was still able to maintain ecological balance. Due to higher temperatures and rainfall, the self-regenerating capacity of natural vegetation was stronger. The entire ecosystem was not as fragile as in the north, and the deterioration process was relatively slow.

China's population exceeded 10 million households during the Han and Tang peaks but reached 20 million households (1–1.2 billion people) during the Song. By 1000 CE, almost the entire North China Plain had become farmland. By the mid-1070s, the Taihang Mountains had lost their pine forests and become barren. Timber shortages during the Song affected the iron and steel industry. Iron smelting originally relied on charcoal as fuel, but the Song's booming iron industry faced shortages of firewood and charcoal and substituted coal. Coal also began replacing firewood in northern households for heating and cooking. To block Liao cavalry, the Song dug many ponds and marshes along the northern border. To fill these ponds and marshes with water, artisans diverted seawater and altered river courses and built dikes. The Song also had local soldiers and civilians plant rice for self-sufficiency, but due to the overly cold climate, this tuntian plan failed. The ponds and marshes became breeding grounds for mosquitoes and black flies. In the Liao state, the grasslands in what is now eastern Inner Mongolia's Horqin region began to desertify. Local Khitans learned farming but used very extensive methods. Newly reclaimed land lost fertility after three to five years, so people sought new reclamation areas. Original farmland was abandoned, the surface exposed without vegetation protection, beginning the process of wind erosion. During the Jin, the area reverted to pasture, with some secondary grasslands and forests appearing, restoring some of the former landscape.

=== River management ===
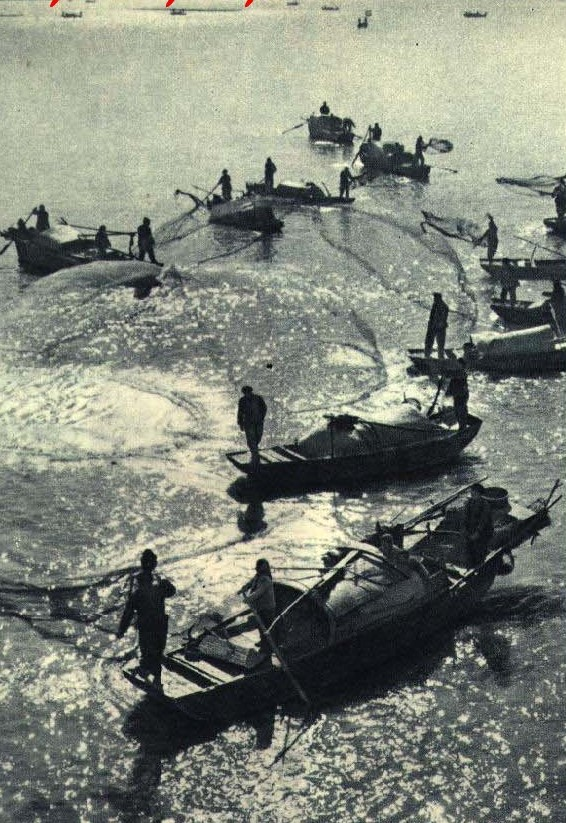
Modern fishing on Hongze Lake

In the section where the Yellow River flows north toward the Bohai Gulf, the Song worked hard on river management, reducing main channel pressure through diversion channels and strengthening dike maintenance. Sometimes they built breakwaters deep in the river channel to reduce water flow impact, and sometimes they laid large amounts of vegetation to protect the dikes. The Northern Song government also diverted the Yellow River northward from the border area between present-day Hebei and Henan, forming a channel on the North China Plain, hoping to use this flooded terrain and artificial ponds to block Liao invasions, but without success. The Yellow River continued changing course on the North China Plain for 80 years, with floods frequently inundating fields, spreading disease, and causing great suffering. Most of the sediment was nutrient-poor sand that only turned farmland into wasteland. Many small rivers on the North China Plain were blocked by sediment deposition and collectively changed course or dried up. To repair river dikes, local residents felled all trees and shrubs in nearby hills for dike support. Because the North China Plain was very flat, floodwater could not drain, causing waterlogging and salinization of the land. Large areas lost their original vegetation. Wind carried sand and dust across the plain, forming dunes. Lakes and ponds silted up, and the silt quickly became very infertile. Much originally fertile land turned into sandy ground. In 1128, in winter, the Bianjing defender breached the Yellow River dike about 80 kilometres (50 mi) north of Kaifeng to relieve the siege of the capital. By 1194, floods and silt finally caused the Yellow River to change course southward, occupying the Qing River and Huai River channels and entering the sea south of the Shandong Peninsula, forming a new large lake, Hongze Lake, at the river mouth. This sea area also became the "Yellow Sea" due to Yellow River inflow. After the 1194 Yellow River course change, the abandoned northern channel became a source of sediment. When winds rose, sandstorms ravaged the entire North China region. On the river channel, "the wilderness had no grass and the five grains did not grow."

Before the Northern Song, siltation of lakes on the North China Plain was slow. After the Southern Song, conditions worsened. The sediment load carried by the Yellow River increased, and flooding frequency rose. Many lakes in the Yellow River basin were filled in after several Yellow River floods. The largest lake in ancient North China was Daluze, located near Julu County. In 1108, the Yellow River changed course northward, flooding Julu City. Daluze also silted up, with its lakebed rising and surface shrinking. Juyeze in Shandong, whose surface was said to span 800 li during the Northern Song (the Liangshan Marsh in Water Margin), received Yellow River water in 1019 and 1077 when the river breached twice. During the Jin, when the Yellow River changed course southward, Juyeze lost its water source. Water receded and sand remained, creating large areas of shoals that were reclaimed by nearby residents. In 1180, the Jin government even sent envoys to recruit refugees for tuntian in Liangshan Marsh. Smaller lakes silted up into flatland even earlier. For example, Heze, Leixiaze in Shandong, and Mengzhuze in Henan had already become flatland during the Song. During the Southern Song, officials responsible for irrigation and canal systems began worrying about upstream deforestation and noted the impact of salinization and flooding on downstream areas.

=== Jiangnan ===
During the Tang and Song dynasties, people expanded the vast low-lying and marshy plains of the Yangtze Delta through drainage methods, with the Song dynasty being particularly enthusiastic about the effort. In the low-lying areas of the Yangtze Delta, the government organized substantial human and material resources to construct many large polders (fields created by building dikes to enclose lakes for cultivation), thereby increasing the area of farmland and raising tax revenue. From the late 11th century to the early 12th century, more than 2,000,000 hectares (5,000,000 acres) of land in the Yangtze Delta region were opened through polder development. In the Northern Song period, most polders around Tai Lake were organized by stationed troops with strict management; ordinary residents were prohibited from imitating the practice, and the prohibitions were quite rigorous. Around 1112, these restrictions began to be relaxed, and privately managed polders started to appear along the shores of Tai Lake. A dense network of waterways connected the individual rice paddies, providing both sources of irrigation water and a transportation network. The establishment of polders, together with the introduction of early-ripening, drought-resistant rice varieties, greatly increased total grain output. Farmers discovered that draining the rice paddies once a year improved the soil's performance, fertility, and productivity. In low-lying farmland areas, people divided the polders into smaller plots that were easier to manage, while establishing cross-village cooperative irrigation management mechanisms. This allowed even low-lying or swamp-like fields to be drained once a year. The area under double-cropping expanded continuously, and more and more forests and marshes were converted into farmland. During the Northern Song, the Tai Lake region in the lower reaches of the Yangtze had fertile land, rare floods, and ecological balance. During the Southern Song, the local population increased significantly, and people enclosed lakes to create fields, causing floods to become more frequent. The Southern Song government initially encouraged the people to widely open polders in the Tai Lake area, which affected the lake's water storage capacity. During flood periods, the water had nowhere to drain, resulting in disasters. The Southern Song government then changed its policy, restored the ban on "stealing" lakes (encroaching on lakes), and even forcibly abolished fields to restore lakes.

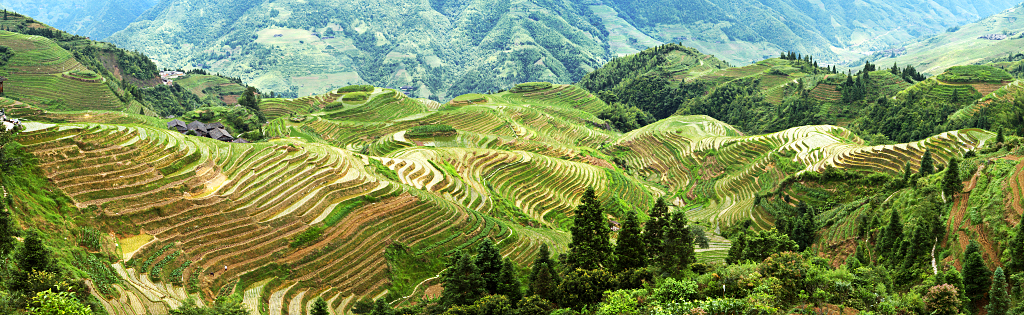
Modern rice terraces in the area of Guilin.

Early-ripening rice revolutionized Song dynasty agriculture. By the 13th century, many hilly areas in the lower Yangtze region and Fujian—where water supply or soil conditions had previously been unsuitable for rice cultivation—were transformed into terraced fields. The landscape of the eastern half of China's rice-growing regions underwent a thorough transformation. Terraced fields became widespread in the Southern Song. On relatively low mountain ridges, terraces were built layer upon layer, extending all the way to the mountain tops. Although the terraces replaced forests on the mountains, they did not cause soil erosion on the slopes. Instead, they retained runoff from the slopes layer by layer, preventing the soil from being washed away and preserving the ecosystem. In contrast, slash-and-burn fields (she tian) in mountainous areas had the opposite effect. These fields did not alter the slope of the mountain land, so the erosive force of rainwater remained strong. After the natural vegetation was burned away, the ground was either left bare or sparsely planted with dryland crops, making it impossible to conserve soil and water and causing severe ecological damage. Many forests in the Yangtze River basin no longer existed, surviving only in some hilly and mountainous areas south of the Yangtze. Tigers could still find habitat there, but elephants, which preferred to live in low-lying places, had disappeared from the Yangtze basin.

From the Southern Song onward, fish ponds were commonly dug in southern mountain valleys, alluvial plains, or delta plains. Fish fry were raised using residues, garbage, and silkworm feces, producing more food per unit area. In the mountains south of the Yangtze, the Miao people and Yao people planted Chinese fir trees for trade and profit. On the other hand, ocean currents carried large amounts of sediment from the new mouth of the Yellow River to the Hangzhou Bay, approximately 320 kilometres (200 mi) away, where it was deposited. This increased the land area along the coast of Jiangsu and boosted rice production there.

=== Central China and Sichuan ===
Before the Northern Song, Dongting Lake in the Jianghan Plain was still expanding, with abundant water volume. During the Northern Song, Dongting Lake reached its maximum width and depth. From the Southern Song onward, as northerners migrated south and grain needs increased, people began enclosing fields for farmland, competing for fertile lake fields. From then on, the lake surface gradually shrank, water capacity declined, and floods caused disasters when they arrived, breaching dikes and inundating fields and houses. At the same time, population growth in the lower Xiang River led many farmers to practice slash-and-burn in mountainous areas, destroying forests and turning local mountains into bare hills. Fortunately, the Xiang River region's forests had strong regenerative capacity. In many areas, after forests were destroyed, secondary forests could grow after several years. Moreover, due to inconvenient transportation in some areas and excessively high mountains that reclamation teams could not reach, some original forests were still preserved. The Song emphasized colonization of Sichuan. After indigenous peoples were assimilated or driven into the forests, Han farmers settled in the river valleys and cleared land. By the 11th century, forests in many areas had been largely felled. Many areas in the region were transformed. Farmers dug hillsides into terraces, stored rainwater, and then planted early-maturing rice varieties. Large areas of forest in Sichuan were felled. The "forbidden mountains" that had once separated Han and indigenous territories were almost completely deforested.

=== South China ===
During the Song, the population of Lingnan continued to increase, but due to fear of malaria, they remained in northern Lingnan and dared not move to other parts of Lingnan. At that time, malaria was mostly found in the alluvial plains of southern rivers rather than upstream areas. From the 11th century, the growth of the Pearl River Delta accelerated. Flood control projects on the Pearl River carried more sediment from upstream to the Pearl River estuary, blocking the view of the sea looking south from Guangzhou. Slash-and-burn agriculture in the upper reaches of the Pearl River system caused soil erosion, sending more sediment down the Dong, Xi, and Bei Rivers. The floodplains in the lower reaches of these rivers, especially where the Dong and Bei Rivers converged, had very fertile soil. These lower river reaches generally flooded every year. As early as 809, the Tang built embankments to prevent the southward-flowing Xi River from joining the northward-flowing Bei River, allowing floodwater to continue flowing downstream. Around 1100, construction began on the Sangyuanwei project, eventually building a dike about 45 kilometres (28 mi) long that protected about 40,000 hectares (100,000 acres) of land from flooding. This created a new era of agricultural development in the Lingnan region. At the same time, seawalls were built in Leizhou Prefecture and western Dongguan, creating nearly 45 kilometres (28 mi) of coastal defense dikes that blocked periodic tides and typhoons, adding 65,000 hectares (160,000 acres) of arable land. However, coastal mangrove forests also disappeared as a result.

In the Song dynasty, a total of 28 dike enclosures were constructed along the upper reaches of the Pearl River, with a combined length of 66,024 zhang, protecting 24,322 qing of farmland. The flood-control dikes confined the rivers to fixed channels so that, during the rainy season, the water would not overflow or burst into multiple channels. Instead, the river water flowed directly into the bay area, turning the former floodplains into land suitable for agriculture. By draining the swamps and waterlogged areas created by flooding, the ecological environment of the malaria vector Anopheles mosquito was altered, making these regions less dangerous to Han Chinese settlers.: 75–76 In the mountainous areas north of Guilin, densely growing cinnamon trees produced cassia bark (cinnamon spice). By around the year 1000, most of the original forests around Guilin had been felled.: 160

=== Land ownership ===
During the Song, mountain and forest property rights underwent nationwide changes, with private ownership of mountains and forests fully recognized. Previously, mountains and forests belonged to the state. People could use mountain and forest resources but could not occupy or reclaim them. During the Song, almost all plain land had already been reclaimed. The government allowed people to legally occupy mountains and marshes, so people began large-scale competition with mountains for land and with water for land. Many mountainous slopes were transformed into terraces, while others became she tian with slash-and-burn cultivation. In some mountainous areas limited by conditions and unable to be reclaimed as fields, they were turned into private forest farms for growing trees. In other mountainous areas that were too steep and inaccessible, mountain owners simply left them idle, retaining only ownership rights but finding it difficult to utilize them. Some mountainous areas remained state-owned forests, but the scope of such forest areas gradually shrank. The government's basic attitude was to open mountains and forests as much as possible, only choosing to close certain forest areas. There was essentially no management of state-owned forests, which were open to anyone for felling, with only slight tax collection called "choufen." During the Northern Song, enclosing lakes for farmland around Tai Lake in the Jiangnan region was prohibited and called "stealing lakes." By the early Southern Song, as large numbers of northern residents migrated south, to supply food, the government officially recognized enclosing lakes for farmland as legal and even used government power to promote it. As a result, lake enclosure for farmland quickly spread throughout Jiangnan. Countless small lakes were soon enclosed and filled, while larger lakes also rapidly shrank.

== Yuan dynasty ==
=== North ===
The Mongols massacred people and attempted to turn all of northern China into their pastureland. Wherever Mongol armies went, city walls and agricultural facilities were razed to the ground. Dams no longer existed, irrigation canals were cut, leaving behind swamps. Grain seeds were burned, fruit trees were sawed down, shelterbelts were felled to the ground, and farmland became desolate, dry grassland exposed to wind and sand. It was not until the reign of Kublai Khan that the practice of turning northern land into pasture was prohibited. The Yuan construction and maintenance of the Grand Canal greatly altered the environment of the North China Plain. To maintain canal water levels and prevent water from draining into the Yellow River, Huai River, or Yangtze River, in addition to using sluice gates and weirs as barriers, people also had to redirect and block small streams and rivers flowing westward into the Shandong Peninsula to ensure all river water entered the Grand Canal. Sediment brought by the Yellow River and its tributaries would deposit in the canal, requiring regular dredging. Dense maintenance was needed at the intersections of the canal with several major rivers. The government had to invest large resources to maintain canal operations; otherwise, its water system could collapse, bringing flood disasters to the North China Plain. After the Yuan changed the Yellow River's course, the abandoned northern channel became a source of sediment. When winds rose, sandstorms ravaged the entire North China region. During the Jin, when the Yellow River changed course southward, Juyeze lost its water source. Water receded and sand remained, creating large areas of shoals that were reclaimed by nearby residents. In 1180, the Jin government even sent envoys to recruit refugees for tuntian in Liangshan Marsh. Smaller lakes silted up into flatland even earlier. During the Southern Song, officials responsible for irrigation and canal systems began worrying about upstream deforestation and noted the impact of salinization and flooding on downstream areas.

By the 14th century, the construction of the Grand Canal had changed the drainage network of the North China Plain. Newly built dikes in the Yellow River basin diverted all of the river's flow into the lower-lying Huai River. The Yuan dynasty paid relatively greater attention to flood control in the Jianghan Plain. It prohibited polder construction around Dongting Lake, converting fields back into lakes, and reopened blocked outlets along the Yangtze that had been sealed during the Southern Song, allowing water to disperse. By the Dade era (1297–1307), a total of six outlets had been reopened.

=== South China ===
Along the Pearl River, the Yuan dynasty not only repaired the old dike enclosures built in the Song but also constructed 34 new ones. The total length of the dikes reached 320 kilometres (200 mi), protecting about 20% of the cultivated land in Guangdong. Out of fear of the Mongol invaders, between 1273 and 1274 many residents and clans from Zhuji Lane in northern Guangdong fled south and settled on small islands at the mouth of the Pearl River. They "intercepted" sediment and reclaimed new farmland on sandbars. These newly reclaimed areas were called "sand flats" (沙坦) or "sand fields," (沙田) new land parcels formed by silt deposition. When the sandbars gradually rose close to the water surface, people placed rocks around them to stabilize the existing sediment and trap more deposits. After building stronger enclosures, beans could first be planted on the sand flats, followed by rice. Chains of sand flats formed tens of thousands of mu of farmland, creating the Pearl River Delta. At the same time, accelerated erosion of abandoned mountainous land in northern Guangdong due to the Mongol invasion sent more sediment from the Dong River to the Pearl River mouth, speeding up sand flat formation.

In the 14th century, formation of the Pearl River Delta accelerated further. Alluvial sandbars appeared along the coast at the mouth of the Dong River, and Xiangshan Island gradually connected to the mainland. The Mongol invasion also caused population growth in the southwestern coastal areas of Guangdong. On the Leizhou Peninsula, people cleared large areas of tropical rainforest and mangrove for reclamation, followed by slash-and-burn practices, causing permanent damage to the local environment. Many areas turned into wasteland.

== Ming dynasty ==
=== North China ===
Before the Ming dynasty, dense forests still existed in the Great Wall region. By the Ming, forests on the Loess Plateau were heavily damaged. In the early Ming, forests in Luya Mountain and Yunzhong Mountain in northwestern Shanxi, and Heng Mountain in northern Shaanxi, remained intact. Some damaged forest areas in the Guanzhong Qinling and Xiao Mountains also partially recovered. After Yongle established the capital in Beijing, the Taihang Mountains became a major source of timber for the city, greatly accelerating deforestation. As the imperial palace and urban development required wood, the government conducted large-scale logging and charcoal production. After prolonged uncontrolled official and private exploitation, the forests in the Great Wall region suffered devastating destruction. After the mid-Ming, large areas of forest disappeared. By around the 17th century, fuel and construction timber were generally in short supply.

Rapid population growth led to continuous reclamation of new farmland and increased demand for daily timber, causing a sudden change. Forest areas shrank quickly. Forests in the Heng Mountains and Lüliang Mountains were successively exhausted. At this point, the massive building materials needed for the capital could no longer be obtained from the middle reaches of the Yellow River and had to be sourced from Sichuan and the Two Lakes region. Due to thorough destruction, the forests' self-renewal capacity was almost lost. The middle reaches of the Yellow River presented a continuous sight of bare mountains. Although the Ming had policies prohibiting logging, their main purpose was to protect the feng shui of imperial tombs or to meet military and political needs. The scope was very limited and showed no genuine ecological awareness.

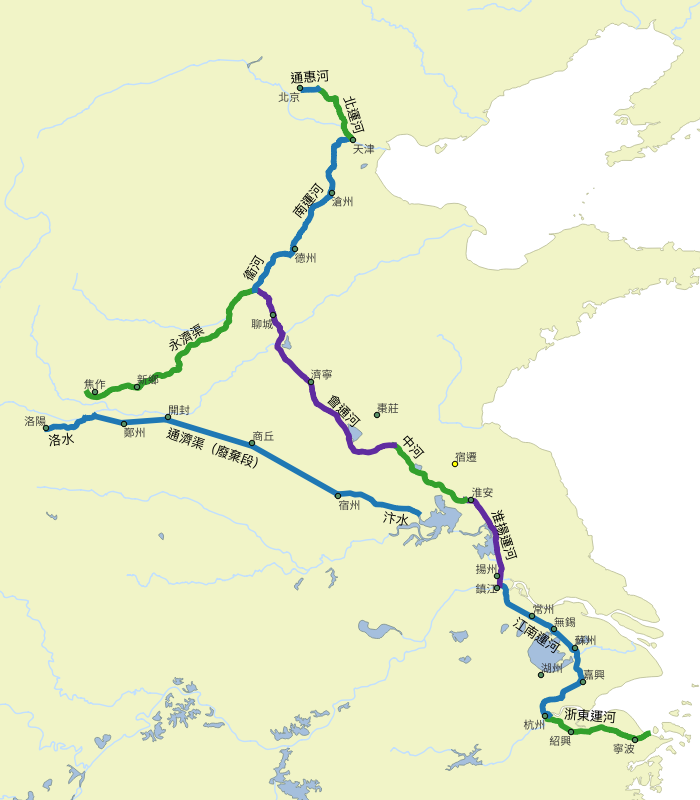
The Grand Canal

In North China, the opening of the Grand Canal slowed the discharge of all rivers, large and small. Sediment continued to accumulate, causing periodic flooding and waterlogging. Because the river water contained salt, waterlogged land easily underwent soil salinization, becoming uncultivable. The worst areas turned into swamps, which then bred locusts. The Beijing-Hangzhou Grand Canal further impeded the already slow-flowing Yellow River and forced the Huai River to backflow into its upper reaches. Sediment from the Grand Canal and Yellow River frequently blocked the mouth of the Huai River, causing floods to spread into the plain. Frequent flooding covered farmland with sand and gravel, sometimes up to 7–8 meters thick. Some formerly prosperous counties with fragrant rice and abundant fish saw large areas of land salinized, turning into barren red earth where even weeds would not grow. Weeds that grew after floods became breeding grounds for locusts. Due to insufficient irrigation, agriculture was limited to drought-resistant crops such as winter wheat, sorghum, and soybeans.

In 1578–1579, Ming official Pan Jixun managed the lower Yellow River by building earthen and stone dikes, dredging the riverbed, and unifying the Yellow River's course. He proposed the method of "constricting the water to attack the sand," using higher and narrower dikes to accelerate flow. Water was constricted within "lǚ dī" near the banks. His river management increased sediment at the sea mouth, lowered the downstream gradient, and diverted clear water into the Yellow River to scour silt from the riverbed. In 1579, Pan Jixun built the Gaojia Weir across the Huai River, storing clear water from the Huai and two other rivers in Hongze Lake. Continuously raising the Gaojia Weir on the eastern shore of Hongze Lake ensured the lake's water level remained higher than the Yellow River, allowing grain-transport boats to pass.

=== Southwest ===
Urban residents' demand for timber prompted mountain residents to specialize in logging and timber transport. The Yunnan-Guizhou region, previously economically undeveloped with sparse settled agricultural population and inhabited mainly by non-Han indigenous peoples, developed under Ming rule into a region increasingly dominated by Han migrants and commercialized. The southwest had rich and diverse ecosystems. In southernmost Yunnan's Xishuangbanna, rolling mountains and dense rivers existed. The Khmu people lived deep in jungles and bamboo forests, practicing slash-and-burn agriculture (continuing into the 20th century) and domesticating elephants. The southwest originally had a healthy ecosystem with tigers and elephants frequently appearing and vast forests. Thai-speaking peoples cleared some river valleys into farmland, while other ethnic groups practiced slash-and-burn. Due to high mountains and deep valleys that were difficult for humans to access, human impact was minimal.

From around 1400, large numbers of Han people arrived in Yunnan and Guizhou. The Ming-established weisuo and military farms spread across the southwest, with 250,000 Han soldiers beginning to farm in river valleys. Indigenous groups' wooden tools could only reclaim lighter alluvial soils in valleys and were unsuitable for the heavy soils of forested areas; they also lacked oxen for plowing. The Ming equipped Han migrants with iron plows and tens of thousands of oxen, enabling them to reclaim forest soils. In the 15th and 16th centuries, millions of mu of farmland were opened in Yunnan and Guizhou. During court wars against indigenous peoples, Han armies set fire to mountains, destroying animal habitats. The ultimate solution to rebellions was to transform different ecological environments into farmland. In Guizhou, some local tusi also led people to shift from slash-and-burn to plow-based production.

=== Northwest ===
The Ordos Desert in the Yellow River Hetao region had varied ecosystems—some purely desert, others grasslands suitable for nomadic life. Here, water from the Yellow River could be diverted for irrigation, allowing Han people to settle and farm. In the late Ming, a total of 594 kilometres (369 mi) of canals had been dug in the Hetao region, irrigating thousands of mu of land. The Ming built the Great Wall in the Ordos to separate the grassland from agrarian society. It ordered stationed troops to burn 50–100 li-wide strips of wasteland north of the Great Wall (at least in strategic locations) each year, depriving Mongol cavalry horses of fodder, destroying pastures so Mongol herders could not enter, but sowing the seeds of desertification. Converting forest and grass vegetation to farmland also tended toward desertification as soil organic matter decreased.

=== Jiangnan and Central China ===
During the Wanli era (1573–1620), several reclamation fields of over one thousand hectares each had been opened along the Yangtze and its tributaries in Anhui. In central China, Hongwu Emperor established military farm weisuo in Hubei, repaired old dikes, and built new water conservancy facilities, recruiting migrants to reclaim land. These policies continued into the 16th century. People built dikes on the southern bank of the Han River, preventing water from overflowing. The riverbed rose higher and the current became faster, greatly increasing flood risk downstream. As a result, downstream residents began building dikes to protect their homes and then reclaimed more swamps and lakes. By the late Ming, the hydrological conditions of the entire Han River basin had been thoroughly transformed by humans. In the 15th and 16th centuries, large numbers of people migrated to Hunan, introducing advanced rice cultivation techniques from the lower Yangtze. They built dikes around swamps and tidal flats to form polders for flood control and irrigation, transforming the area into rice fields. Some early polders were very large, reaching thousands or tens of thousands of mu. Xu Guangqi already recognized human causes of flooding. He criticized powerful local families for encroaching on swamps, lakes, and riverbank alluvial plains, filling water bodies to create fields, which increased flood risk and harmed entire settlements.

=== Southern mountainous areas ===
Before the Ming, there were only a few settlements in hilly and mountainous areas. Most terraced fields followed riverbanks near cities. In most regions, reclamation of hills and mountains began in the late Ming. After mountain forests were privatized, some private forests in the south survived. After timber was cut and sold, mountain owners would replant to regenerate them. During the Ming and Qing, private forestry was common, especially in southern Anhui and Fujian. Mountain tribes south of the Yangtze specialized in cultivating Chinese fir and producing timber. At this time, public forest resources were becoming exhausted, while private plantations grew trees for sale, yielding good profits. Mountain owners did not necessarily manage the forests themselves but could lease them to others. In general, private plantations were well protected with high survival rates for replanting, in stark contrast to the destruction of public forests. After the mid-16th century, planting Chinese fir became prevalent in southeastern mountainous areas. Broadleaf forests turned into coniferous forests such as fir. Small animal populations in the mountain forests decreased, tigers faced food shortages and increasingly attacked livestock in the plains, while Asian black bears and wolves that once lived in broadleaf forests gradually became extinct. On the other hand, the Ming issued orders to protect monastery forests to maintain the natural environment around temples.

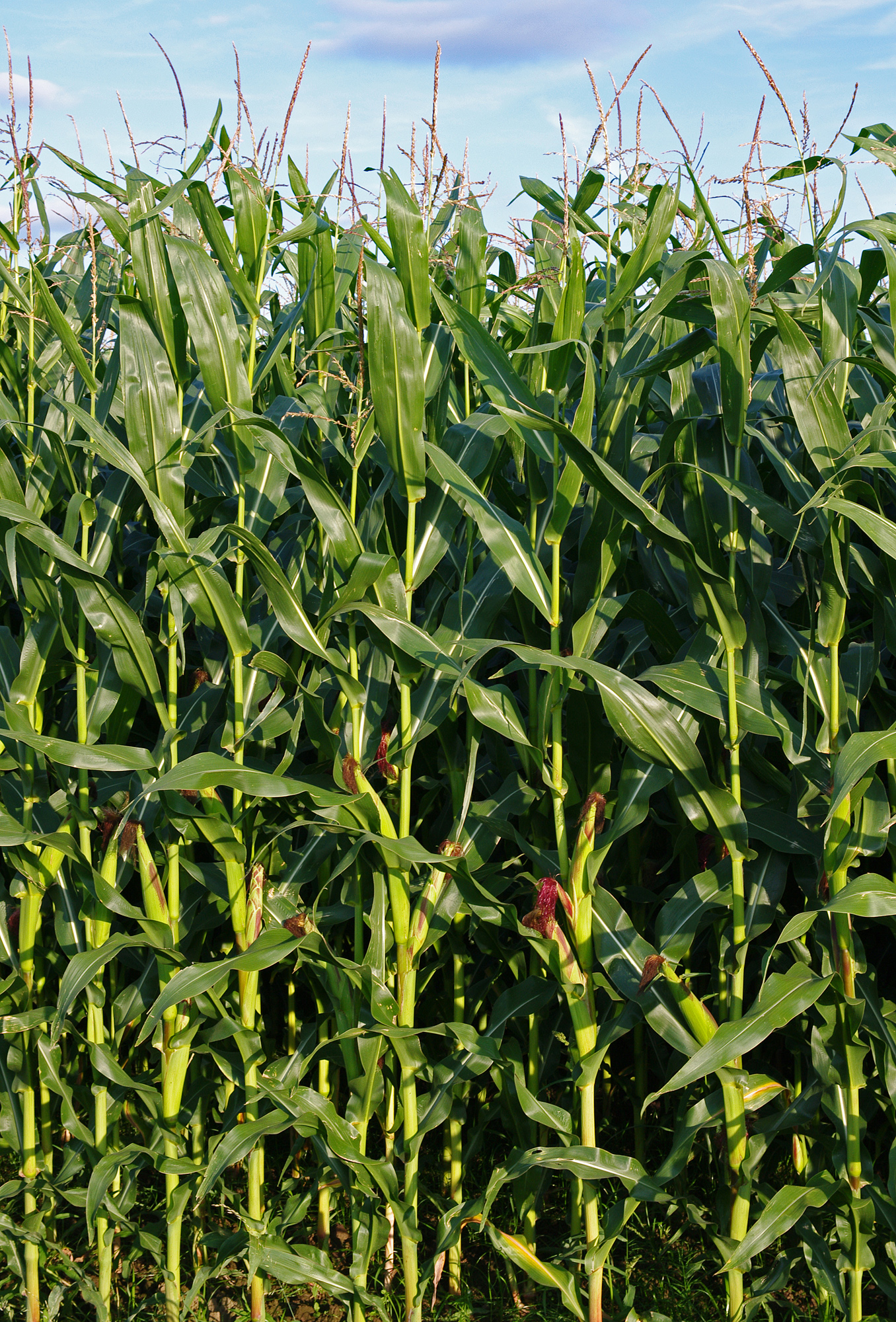
Maize from the Americas

In the Yangtze basin and Lingnan, lowland farmland became increasingly insufficient. New migrants, seeking arable land, had to penetrate deep into the mountains and learn various skills from locals. In the first half of the 16th century, New World crops from the Americas—maize, potato, sweet potato, peanut, and tobacco—spread to China, exerting a huge ecological impact. Han people migrating into the mountainous border regions of Jiangxi, Fujian, and Guangdong formed the origin of the Hakka people. The Hakkas merged and assimilated with the local indigenous She people. Around 1500, the mountainous border of the three provinces became Hakka territory. Their dialects and customs differed markedly from those of lowland Han.

The Hakkas cleared mountain forests and widely planted maize and sweet potatoes, selling mountain products outward. Hemp, ramie, indigo, tea, sugarcane, and tobacco were the most common cash crops planted by Hakkas. From the mid-16th century onward, Hakkas began migrating to mountainous areas across southern and southeastern China, selling products to riverside towns. They also rented large mountainous lands from Han landlords and recruited poor She people to clear forests using slash-and-burn methods. In the 16th and 17th centuries, large numbers of Hakka and She men migrated northward into the mountains of Jiangxi, Anhui, and Zhejiang, becoming mobile populations known to the government as "shed people" (pengmin, 棚民). They built temporary sheds, developed mountain land, and moved on after exhausting the soil. In the mountainous areas of the Gan River basin in Jiangxi, most land had previously been densely forested and untouched by Han logging until the arrival of the shed people. Many shed people in Jiangxi mountains were miners, loggers, and papermakers. Their food mainly came from slash-and-burn on forest edges, gradually damaging the Jiangxi mountain environment.

=== Hainan Island ===
Hainan Island had numerous coral reefs and oyster breeding areas in the north. The island was covered with various tropical forests containing over 3,500 plant species. Indigenous Li people practiced slash-and-burn to grow mountain yams and upland rice, supplemented by forest hunting and gathering. Due to their small population, their impact on the ecosystem was limited. During the Ming, the amount of cultivated land on Hainan doubled, from about 2 million mu around 1400 to 3.8 million mu in 1615, most of it farmed by Han people. Hainan had been transformed to become suitable for Han habitation. The government encouraged Han people to burn forests in river valleys and mountains. Continuous burning created opportunities for tropical cogongrass to grow.

== Qing dynasty ==
In the mid-Qing, China's forests and vegetation suffered the most severe destruction. The Qing population expanded rapidly—from only 80–90 million in the early Qing to about 268 million by 1776, marking China's first population explosion. In the early Qing, officials paid little attention to forest logging, reclamation of wasteland and lakes, or other environmental destruction. The court adopted an active reclamation policy, encouraging people to open wasteland through tax reductions and pressuring local officials with rewards or punishments based on the amount of new land reclaimed. By the early Qianlong era (1736–1796), not only had all abandoned land been recultivated, but plain land had also been turned into farmland. Local officials everywhere petitioned that people should be allowed to enter mountains for reclamation. In 1742, the Qing ordered permanent tax exemption for reclaimed mountain land. On the other hand, maize varieties introduced from abroad since the mid-Ming were drought- and cold-resistant and suitable for high mountain cultivation, solving the problem of land and food shortages caused by population growth. Thus, in the early Qianlong years, a frenzy of mountain reclamation erupted. This large group of mountain reclaimers was collectively called "shed people" or "hut people." The number of shed people in the mid-Qing far exceeded that of the Ming, and their range was no longer limited to provinces such as Fujian, Jiangxi, and Zhejiang. They rarely planted indigo anymore and mainly grew maize, spreading to 14 provinces nationwide. The result of large numbers of migrants developing mountain areas was severe ecological deterioration and declining productivity of farmland in wide areas. The limits of the ecological environment could be said to have ended the prosperous age of the Kangxi, Yongzheng, and Qianlong periods.

Over the hundred-odd years of the mid-Qing, China's ecological environment suffered unprecedented fatal destruction. First, most of the forests remaining from the early Qing disappeared entirely. Second, bare mountains and ridges without vegetation protection suffered erosion by rain, carrying away mud and sand. Third, downstream rivers became silted and obstructed, leading to frequent floods. Fourth, large amounts of sediment washed onto plain farmland, causing slow desertification of cultivated land and declining productivity. The reasons for accelerated development in the 18th century included increased demand for timber and fuel, shortages of food crops, and expansion of cash crop cultivation.

Large populations migrated from densely populated, intensively farmed areas to marginal regions such as the southwest, northeast, and inland mountains. By the late 18th century, population growth prompted more intensive use of natural resources. Deforestation became severe and an energy crisis loomed. Animals such as tigers and elephants were pushed to the most remote areas. Some Chinese also began to recognize the problem of species extinction. Herbivores such as deer, wild boar, and porcupine lived in the deciduous broadleaf forests of the southeast, which had long been tiger prey. From the late 17th century, the forests where these animals lived gradually shrank. The buffer zone between tigers and humans disappeared, and tigers began entering villages directly to attack livestock and people, leading to frequent tiger appearances in the 18th century. By 1800, South China tigers could barely survive only in a few mountainous areas on the borders of Guangdong and Jiangxi and in Fujian. Asian elephants were pushed to remote areas on the border of Yunnan and Burma. By the early 19th century, almost no part of China remained undeveloped by humans. Completely "natural" areas untouched by humans were extremely rare. Most land had been farmed. The scope of primitive natural areas continued to shrink, with the remainder mainly the most remote and inaccessible high mountains, deep valleys, and underground rivers.

Maize and sweet potatoes greatly changed the economic environment of Chinese farmers. Sweet potatoes were introduced to China in the late 16th century and had spread almost everywhere by the 1730s. Maize and sweet potatoes could be grown almost anywhere and supplied food to miners, loggers, tobacco and indigo planters, tea pickers, and others in mountain or forest areas, triggering a sudden surge in the exploitation of mountain and forest resources in the mid-to-late 18th century. The Ming had declared many mountains and forests as prohibited zones. The Qing government paid less attention to population control; only a few mountainous areas remained off-limits for security reasons. By the 18th century, illegal settlement occurred in such areas. Most of these settlements soon received official approval, canceling the prohibition. People began turning the original natural environment into only two types of land: carefully maintained, productive private farmland or brutally exploited, unproductive public wasteland. In addition to slash-and-burn mountain fields and conversion to farmland, newly developing industries such as porcelain, iron smelting, papermaking, shipbuilding, salt, and lime consumed nearby forests for fuel and timber. By the 18th century, supplies of wood fuel and charcoal became rapidly scarce. Many officials and scholars recognized the crisis brought by ecological deterioration and repeatedly spoke out to dissuade, but because officials and people were driven by livelihood and economic needs and had no other options, people focused only on development and not on environmental protection. Leaders of the Self-Strengthening Movement among provincial governors focused on developing minerals and energy, viewing nature as an enemy that could be conquered. Few officials could think about environmental issues. What concerned them most was how to collect taxes effectively while also caring for farmers' interests.

=== Forests ===
==== Deforestation ====
During the mid-Qing Qianlong (1736–1796) and Jiaqing (1796–1820) reigns, the nation's forests suffered unprecedented severe destruction. There were three reasons: First, the population explosion during the Qian-Jia period exceeded the carrying capacity of natural resources, leading to ecological deterioration. Second, inappropriate government policies strongly encouraged reclamation. Even after wasteland was filled, people could only move into mountainous areas. The Qing had no practical mountain forest management policy. Although some mountainous areas were nominally prohibited, the measures were not strictly enforced. Large numbers of migrants broke through restricted zones to reclaim land. Migrants entering mountains to open wasteland were like fishing in the open sea, with no intention of protecting natural resources. Third, the introduction of maize. Traditional crops had strict land requirements and could not adapt to the cold climate of high mountains. These factors naturally protected vast mountain areas and limited the number of people entering. But after maize was introduced in the mid-Ming, China for the first time had a grain crop suitable for high mountain cultivation, causing large numbers of migrants to pour into mountain areas during the Qian-Jia period. These shed people entered remote, ownerless deep mountains and destroyed forests in the most barbaric ways to plant indigo and maize. Removing natural vegetation on high-slope mountains and replacing it with crops immediately caused soil erosion. A few heavy rains could expose bare rock. The shed people then constantly migrated, sweeping forests clean wherever they went and leaving bare mountains and desolate ridges. Within a short 100 years, the last remaining forests in the country were wiped out.

In the Tang, Song, Yuan, and Ming dynasties, slash-and-burn fields did not reach deep old-growth mountain forests because crops such as millet and broomcorn millet could not adapt to the low temperatures in the mountains. But the situation changed greatly in the Qing. With the introduction of maize, there was now a crop adapted to high mountain climates. Due to population explosion, the Qing government opened previously prohibited deep old-growth forests, leading to large numbers of shed people entering mountains to reclaim land and plant maize. This occurred not only in Jiangnan but also in the Qinling in Shaanxi, where shed people practiced slash-and-burn. Numbering in the millions and spread across 14 provinces, the shed people cleared deep-mountain forests in the most barbaric and exterminatory ways, opening farmland and planting maize. These mountain fields lacked forest cover, causing rapid soil erosion. After heavy rain, topsoil washed away, leaving bare rock, and the fields could no longer be cultivated. Thus, every three to five years the shed people had to migrate and destroy forests elsewhere in the same way—"eat one mountain and move to another." In the mid-Qing, some remaining deep old-growth forests on the Loess Plateau were invaded and reclaimed by migrants. From the Qinling mountains within Zhouzhi County southwest to Yang County, about 300 kilometers of deep mountains, tens of thousands of people entered each year to plant maize or log. Most of the Huayin area at the eastern end of the Qinling turned into bare mountains. Near Mount Long, mountains were stripped bare. Forests north of Datong Prefecture that still remained in the Ming were now completely destroyed. To suppress the White Lotus Rebellion, Qing officials also logged in the Qinling mountains to clear bandit hideouts in the deep old-growth forests.

In 1750, forest cover in China was approximately 25%. Taking Henan Province as an example, forest cover was about 6.3% around 1700 but decreased to 2% by the Daoguang era (1821–1850). Scholars estimated that shed people destroyed 100 million mu of forest every five years; over 100 continuous years this would destroy 2 billion mu, reducing China's forest area by more than half. In the mid-18th century, deep in the Qinling range, many timber mills and ironworks appeared. Merchants rented land from landlords to obtain management rights over mountain areas and recruited shed people from Anhui, Hunan, Jiangxi, and other places to engage in logging and iron smelting. They used predatory planting methods: digging out tree roots from the mountains, burning them into ash to scatter, planting maize without applying fertilizer. Exposed slopes lost soil easily; after three or four years fertility declined, so they rented other land. Almost all mountains that encountered shed people reclamation turned into barren hills. Once primary forests were cut, secondary forests might be cut a few years later for charcoal, but in most cases the forests disappeared forever. In the early 19th century, the Daba Mountains on the border of Shaanxi and Sichuan were one of the few areas in China proper still retaining primary forests. Migrant farmers cleared land for cultivation, usually moving on after two to five years when the land lost fertility or after flood damage. Investors hired tens of thousands of loggers to cut timber for fuel for mines, salt factories, iron smelting, and papermaking workshops. When cheap firewood supplies were exhausted, these workshops either closed or switched to coal.

The Qing continued large-scale procurement of imperial timber, causing large-sized timber resources to gradually dry up. Timber required for construction projects became increasingly scarce. Large timbers used in Qing palaces were available only in remote mountain areas that had never been commercially developed due to high transportation costs. Imperial requisitions had a great impact on primary forests, with large amounts of timber cut and concentrated in a few areas. In the early Qing, nanmu was already insufficient, so the Kangxi Emperor had to substitute pine. However, in the early 18th century the court could again requisition some nanmu from Sichuan. At that time only three provinces—Fujian, Hunan, and Sichuan—could still supply timber for court construction, forcing the Qing to reduce construction scale. After nanmu was exhausted, they had to prospect in northern Sichuan and deep mountains in Yunnan. One of the main difficulties in rebuilding after the burning of the Old Summer Palace was the lack of giant timbers. By the mid-19th century, remaining forests were located in the northeast, Yunnan, Guangxi, Hainan Island, and other subtropical areas, as well as the Qinling mountains. After 1850, due to deforestation, environmental degradation appeared in the Wei River basin and Loess Plateau. Mountain peaks around Taiyuan Prefecture in Shanxi that had once been heavily wooded were reduced to bare skeletons. Except around temples, no trees could be seen on mountains or plains in Shanxi Province.

To pacify the Taiping Rebellion, court armies set large-scale fires in forests in central and southern regions—an ancient strategy against bandits. In the 1870s, Ferdinand von Richthofen remarked: "From Hankou to Beijing, all mountain peaks and hills are extremely lacking in forests and shrubs, presenting a very desolate scene." By the late Qing, population density increased while mountain forests shrank. Even crops in mountainous areas stagnated or declined due to excessive soil exhaustion. Sharp reduction in forests and soil erosion caused silt deposition and river channel blockage. Once-fertile land was covered by sediment. This led to frequent and increasingly severe floods starting from the Daoguang era (1821–1850). The frequency of floods and droughts had increased since the Han dynasty and reached an extreme in the Qing. Due to mountain development and shrinking forest area, wild animals decreased and the ecosystem lost balance. Combined with human hunting, tiger populations gradually disappeared. The South China tiger became a rare species, yet tiger attacks increased as tigers, in order to survive, turned to villagers as prey. By the early 20th century, the North China wilderness had no trees or shrubs at all. Every inch of usable land was planted with grain. Fuel for cooking and heating continuously decreased. Timber supply could not meet demand, causing an energy crisis. Many people had to convert firewood stoves to coal stoves. Farmers everywhere collected crop stalks, dry grass, and animal dung for fuel. Remaining trees had their low branches cut off, and dead branches and fallen leaves were gathered together for fuel, further depriving the soil of organic nutrients and making the environment even more barren. Overall grain yields declined, especially in North and Central China.

==== Conservation ====
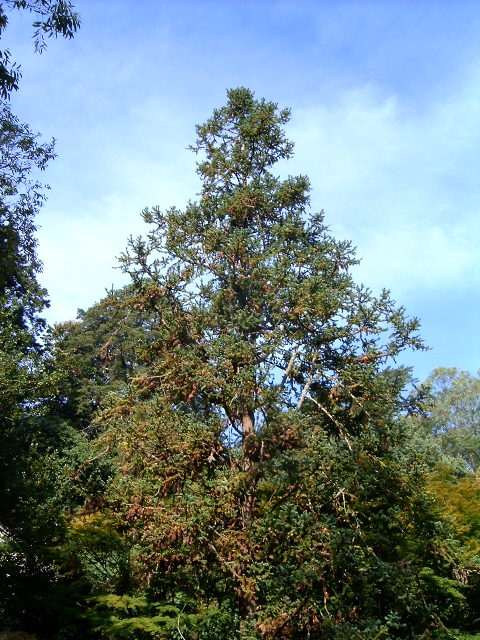
Chinese fir

The primary forests of the southeastern hilly and mountainous areas were evergreen broadleaf forests. From the late 17th century, people began developing these forests, turning them into Chinese fir plantations and ramie cultivation areas. The Qing implemented some artificial afforestation in mountainous areas, but the effectiveness of tree planting was far less than the area of logging and slash-and-burn reclamation. In the first half of the Qianlong era (1736–1796), provincial governors everywhere submitted memorials encouraging tree planting and once promoted a policy of "advising people to plant trees," but actual results were minimal. High officials such as Yan Ruyi, Lu Kun, and Tao Zhu pointed out the close relationship between forest destruction, erosion, floods, and poor soil quality. In the early 19th century, provincial officials began suggesting that further reclamation of southern and eastern hills should be prohibited to reduce damage from soil erosion. These suggestions particularly focused on the shed people problem. During the Daoguang (1821–1850) and Xianfeng (1851–1861) eras, the court repeatedly issued orders prohibiting mountain use, which finally reduced the area planted with maize in mountainous regions. However, the Qing government's power to prevent farmers from entering prohibited mountains was ultimately limited. Prohibition orders only delayed or obstructed the trend of development rather than thoroughly saving wilderness.

Official and private measures for maintaining and managing forest land included: 1. imperial hunting grounds such as the Mulan Paddock, 2. monastery forests, 3. clan and village public forests, 4. agricultural forests, 5. economic forests, 6. primary forests. But by the late 19th century, these forest management cases had almost all collapsed. The Mulan Paddock abolished autumn hunts after 1820 and allowed common people to enter for reclamation. Some monastery abbots and monks sold monastery timber to timber merchants. Primary forests were also logged. Two relatively successful examples in forest management were agricultural forests and economic forests. For example, forests in northern Jiangxi and Fujian were managed by wealthy merchants to supply fuel for the guan ware of Jingdezhen. Maintaining forests was more economically valuable than opening farmland. Species such as Chinese fir were protected because of their fast growth and fuel value. In the late Qing, residents in the Min River basin of Fujian logged and sold timber while replanting the most economically valuable Chinese fir and camphor trees. The only remaining forests were either in areas difficult for humans to reach, natural reserves prohibiting Han entry, ethnic minority areas, or small patches of woodland on mountain slopes belonging to temples or graveyards. The most precipitous and remote mountainous areas—such as western Fujian, Yunnan, southwestern Sichuan, and the Changbai Mountains along the border with Korea—retained forests the longest.

=== North China ===
North China may have been the region with the most severe environmental degradation nationwide during the Qing. Severe river channel siltation caused rivers in the region to tend toward flooding and course changes. Human encroachment on riverbanks and lakes caused lakes and ponds to shrink or disappear. Building dikes and opening canals altered the normal floodplains of rivers, making them more dangerous during high-water periods and causing frequent waterlogging disasters. After each flood breach, areas reached by river water turned into swamps. When they dried, the plain sometimes became a saline-alkali desert difficult to cultivate. Siltation of the water transport system made the entire region even more vulnerable during floods. Major drainage areas and shallow lake zones that had once served as floodplains gradually disappeared, so that even slightly excessive rainfall endangered local crops.

The lower Yellow River silted rapidly in the 1670s. Because floods could not reach the sea, the river channel split. The main channel to the sea was reduced to "a single thread," and deposition gradually thickened. The official in charge of river management, Jin Fu, built earthen dikes along the river to concentrate flow and scour sediment. The separated downstream channels reconverged. His river management plan was largely successful. Between 1645 and 1855, the southern course of the Yellow River experienced a flood once every 1.89 years on average. Siltation began in Hongze Lake along the Grand Canal. The lakebed continued to rise. In 1824 a major breach finally occurred, flooding eastern Jiangsu Province. The Daoguang Emperor exerted great effort to control the flood and repair the Grand Canal. In 1852 the main course of the Yellow River shifted north. Because new riverbanks in northern Shandong were still forming, major floods occurred in the second half of the 19th century, damaging the North China Plain. The Huai River's outlet to the sea was completely cut off. Huai River water could only enter the Yangtze via Hongze Lake, but this route was insufficient to absorb the Huai's flow, so the river frequently overflowed and caused flooding. At this time the Qing government was no longer able to manage the Huai River. It could not afford the high costs of water conservancy maintenance. Beset by internal and external troubles, it was unable to mobilize resources to solve the environmental deterioration in the Huai River basin and abruptly abandoned Huai River management. As a result, Huai River management completely collapsed. Periodic waterlogging and famine occurred, causing extreme economic chaos throughout the basin. As the court withdrew from Yellow River management, the water conservancy management system on the North China Plain severely shrank and ecological balance collapsed. Floods frequently occurred in the 19th century. The 1855 Yellow River course change was followed by continuous flooding and waterlogging, forming shallow, wide swamps in southern Zhili Province.

The Qing carried out several state-run large-scale swamp drainage projects, such as planting rice on state-owned land near Tianjin, with partial success. Opponents included owners of wasteland and users of lakes, who had long harvested reeds, caught birds, and hunted waterfowl there. However, officials considered grain production the most important. In the capital region, to solve siltation problems, the Qing dug diversion channels between the two large lakes "Dongdian" and "Xidian," which stretched about 130 kilometres (80 mi) between Tianjin and Baoding, as well as in areas about 32 kilometres (20 mi) to their north and south, to discharge silt while hoping to draw out clear lake water. Dongdian and Xidian were originally large, species-rich ecosystems and the most biodiverse areas on the North China Plain. They had once supported herds of deer, wolves, leopards, tigers, and various waterbirds, shellfish, fish, and turtles. The area was also a stopover on migratory bird routes. As Dongdian and Xidian gradually silted up, farmers began reclaiming them as farmland. By the late 19th century, wealthy locals were reclaiming and farming the fertile lakebed mud. Dongdian shrank to one-third its previous size and eventually disappeared. With the natural ecosystem of the lakes converted to single-crop agriculture, humans lost natural sources of dietary protein and could only rely on grain from cultivated land. Ecological degradation was an important cause of rural impoverishment.

In other parts of the North China Plain, as more vegetation and trees were cut, sediment continued to accumulate and floods became increasingly frequent and severe. After the Grand Canal was abandoned, fuel such as sorghum stalks became scarce. Once timber was used up, farmers were forced to burn livestock dung—a very inefficient fuel. On the Loess Plateau, the most serious consequence of local ecological change was soil erosion, leaving bare rocky mountains with no grass. Rivers not only washed away topsoil but also cut downward, making riverbeds lower and lower. The plateau had many non-perennial surface flows that were dry most of the time and only flowed during summer storms. These flows cut into the ground, forming gullies of various sizes that deepened and widened year by year. The originally vast plain was cut into fragmented small pieces. In the early Qing, the mountain valleys of Rehe originally had forests and shrub grasslands. Its south had wild animals such as tigers, deer, and bears, so early Chengde became an imperial hunting ground. From the 18th century, Han migrants logged for fuel and building materials. By the early 20th century, except for isolated deep old-growth forests such as Wuling Mountain and mountain ridges on the Mongolian Plateau, almost all primary forests had disappeared. Migrant mining and farming activities rapidly changed Rehe's forest environment. The Mulan Paddock was also opened to land buyers. By the late 19th century, the Qing finally decided to open the hunting ground to agriculture.

=== Central China ===
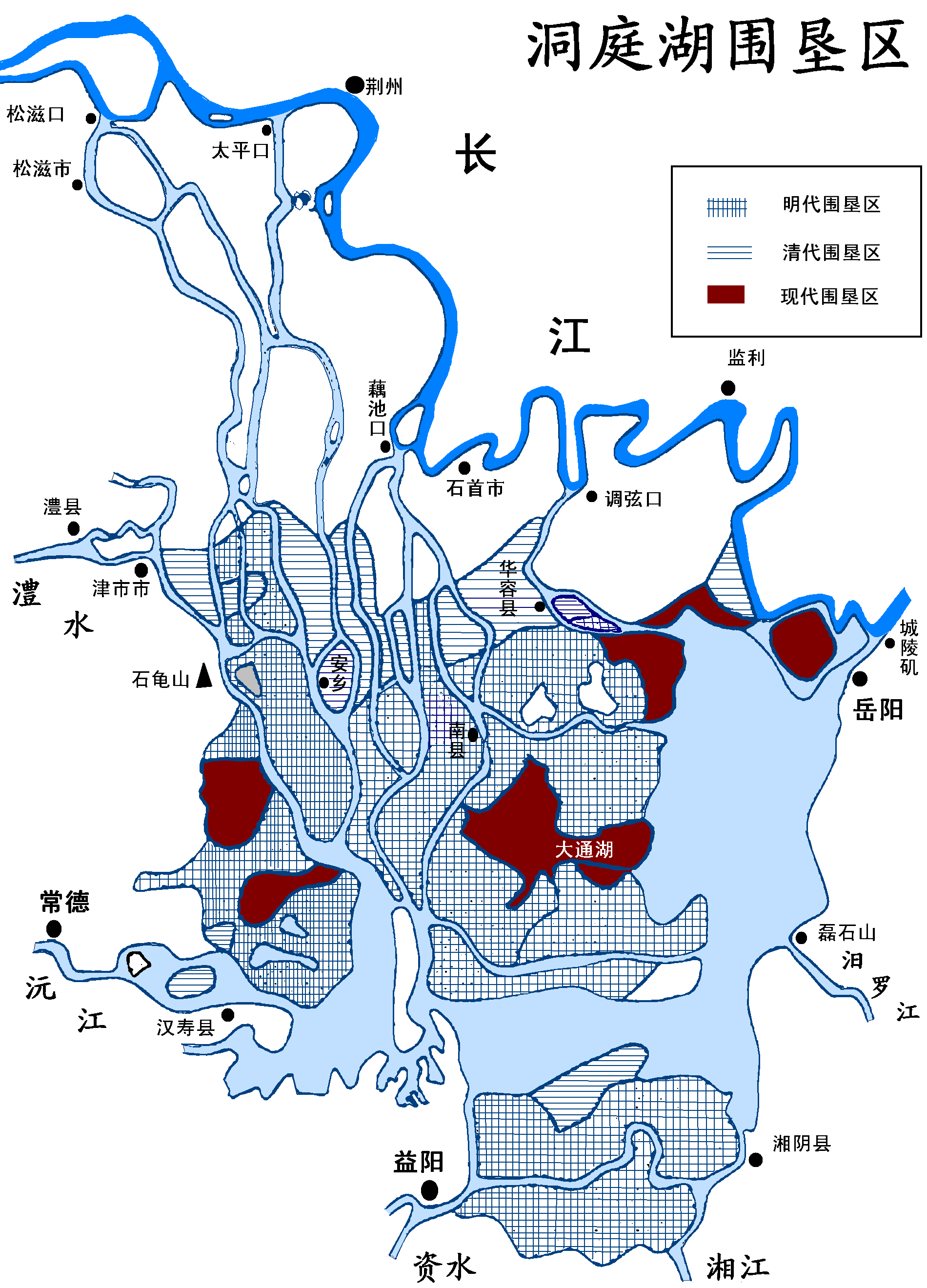
Reclamation area around Dongting Lake

Wars at the end of the Ming and beginning of the Qing made the water control system in Hubei difficult to maintain. Dikes were damaged and many areas were flooded for decades. From the 1680s, the Qing invested substantial resources to rebuild dikes along the Han River. Later, wealthy local families privately built dikes and polders, further restricting the natural flow of river water. In the Jianghan Plain, breaches caused by poor dike maintenance became increasingly common and floods more frequent. By the 18th century, some fields had become permanent waterlogged areas. In the 19th century, floods inundated more areas. Local farmers began planting crops that could mature before flood season or aquatic plants. Some simply abandoned farming and turned to fishing. In Hunan, Dongting Lake had long absorbed excess water from the Yangtze and some Hunan rivers, releasing it when Yangtze water levels dropped in autumn and winter. This function of Dongting Lake kept the Yangtze stable. The high tide of reclamation around Dongting Lake rose again in the Qing. During the Kangxi era (1662–1722), the government not only did not prohibit but encouraged development of polder fields, exempting new polders from tax. The resulting lake enclosure for fields caused flooding problems. Local officials repeatedly memorialized suggesting conversion of fields back to lakes. Thus in 1748 the Qing issued a prohibition on new polders, banning construction of new dike polders or enclosure of lakes on high ground. But the order was generally ignored and private reclamation continued. At the time there were many people but little land, so the prohibition on polders was difficult to enforce. Reclamation around Dongting Lake continued in a half-open, half-prohibited state.

In the 18th century, the population of Hunan Province surged, reaching 17 million by 1800. Large numbers of illegal private dikes were built. As a result, Dongting Lake became surrounded by dikes. There were 600 diked enclosures in the Qing, and the rate at which the lake surface shrank accelerated. In the 19th century, due to reclamation and increased siltation, Dongting Lake's surface became smaller and smaller while its lakebed rose higher and higher. Not only did the lake's capacity decline sharply and often become shallow, but sediment content surged. In flood season, water rushed down and caused disasters. This led to even more severe floods. By the 19th century, multiple major floods occurred. The Yangtze experienced a flood on average every four years. Although raising dikes could protect certain areas, it transferred the flood disaster to other places, especially the now lower-lying old polder fields. Because of the massive increase in silt deposition, by the second half of the 19th century most of the lake had been reclaimed. There were over a thousand plots totaling more than five million mu. By the Guangxu era (1875–1908), Dongting Lake's area had shrunk to only 5,400 square kilometers.

From the 16th century, shed people from Jiangxi gradually migrated to Hunan, logging forests in the mountainous areas around Dongting Lake and further exacerbating flooding in the lowlands. By the mid-19th century, clearing and reclamation in many parts of Hunan had approached its limit. To obtain arable land, people cut down all trees on mountains and drained all swamps. Forests were exhausted of all resources. In wild mountainous areas, tigers and leopards still roamed in the 1720s, but by the 1760s these wild animals had disappeared. Sediment slid from bare mountain slopes into rivers and continued flowing into Dongting Lake, causing the lakebed to rise and more floods. In the early 19th century, officials more clearly recognized the ecological crisis. Wei Yuan pointed out that although dike polders around Dongting Lake might protect local polders from flood disasters, the floodwater would continue flowing downward, endangering several of the most densely populated provinces in the lower Yangtze.

=== Jiangnan ===
In the lower Yangtze during the Qing, rice, silk, and cotton production all approached their limits. Increases in production and agricultural intensification often relied on encroaching on waterways and areas with slow water flow. People also developed hills. Initial returns were quite high, but mountain forest resources were soon exhausted and nature became irreversibly impoverished: forest destruction, topsoil erosion, and destruction of river systems made intensive agriculture unsustainable on hills in the long term and threatened the agricultural ecology of valleys. This environmental deterioration destroyed the resilience of both ecological and social systems. Until the 18th century, some steep slopes several hundred meters high and mountain peaks one or two thousand meters high in Jiangnan were still wilderness. Some basins and river valleys remained undeveloped. Although shed people had already migrated there in the Ming, their numbers were still small. But in the 18th century new ways of developing hills appeared that gradually impaired their recovery capacity. Due to population pressure, some Han people in river valleys were squeezed out and became shed people. Large numbers entered and reclaimed mountain land, greatly damaging the mountain environment in the lower Yangtze. They mainly planted maize, which required less labor. After cutting primary forests and selling the timber or using it as fuel, shed people began planting maize, which required large amounts of fertilizer. This exhausted the fertility accumulated in mountain soil over one or two hundred years, causing the soil to harden so it could no longer be cultivated. The shed people then migrated to another forest and repeated the process: reclaiming and burning another mountain area. Eastern and southern China became sparsely wooded. Hills eroded, while floods and droughts constantly threatened densely settled villages and crops in river valleys.

By the mid-18th century, there were so many shed people in mountainous areas that "mountains were full wherever one looked." "In the deep mountains, there is almost no uncultivated land." This production technique damaged soil and water resources in both local and downstream areas, leading to severe degradation of the mountain ecological environment. Soil lacked humus and became acidic, leading to podzolization or brick red soil formation. No crops could grow and land was frequently abandoned. As mountain soil erosion occurred, mud and sand washed down from the mountains, destroying good farmland on plains and in river valleys. Coal mines could alleviate fuel shortages, but mining caused forest disappearance and soil erosion. Open-pit shallow coal mining also spread mine waste into irrigation channels and farmland. Both soil erosion and water pollution increased risks to downstream agriculture. People created new fields through polder construction and opening terraced fields. Former wasteland was brought into production using new crops and new techniques. Even on hilly land, development had reached its limit. On hills, mines and handicraft workshops were widespread. People accelerated extraction of timber, bamboo, and other resources, while mountain slopes were cleared to plant dye and fiber crops and other cash crops, as well as new food crops such as maize and sweet potatoes. Exploitation of mountain resources exceeded nature's regenerative or reforestation capacity. Timber became less available and more expensive. Some merchants rented hillside land, hired workers to cut grass, and sold it as cooking fuel. In the early 19th century, it was said that firewood sold for as much as precious cinnamon wood. The decline of Jingdezhen in the 18th century can partly be attributed to the disappearance of forests in surrounding areas, severe shortages of charcoal and firewood, and the deterioration of water transport due to river siltation. Before the mid-19th century, papermaking also began to decline in some places due to overcutting of bamboo and paper mulberry.

After 1740, the government realized that overdevelopment of lowlands might further trigger floods. Many officials suggested controlling, suspending, or abandoning reclamation in areas with particularly high pressure on waterways. By the early 19th century, both locals and officials understood the damage to the environment. While land became increasingly barren, some large landlords continued converting lakes, ponds, and tidal flats into fields. In areas such as Tai Lake, South Lake (Jiaxing), and Jinghu Lake, dikes and polders were continuously built, causing lake areas to shrink and increasing the possibility of droughts and floods. Rice field reclamation had also reached its limit. In the early Ming there were 199 lakes on the Ning-Shao Plain. By the 20th century, except for 44 that had been completely filled, the remaining lakes had reduced area and water storage capacity, leaving almost no space for new polders. New water fields built along water edges meant other fields could no longer receive direct irrigation. Demand for irrigation water rose while storage capacity declined, increasing the risk of both flood and drought disasters. From the early 19th century, Qing officials began prohibiting further reclamation in mountainous areas and along waterways in the lower Yangtze. They prohibited planting maize and replaced it with crops that could maintain soil, while expelling short-term laborers who had moved into hilly areas. However, many orders could not actually be implemented and had little effect. Threatened shed people further intensified exploitation of mountain resources.

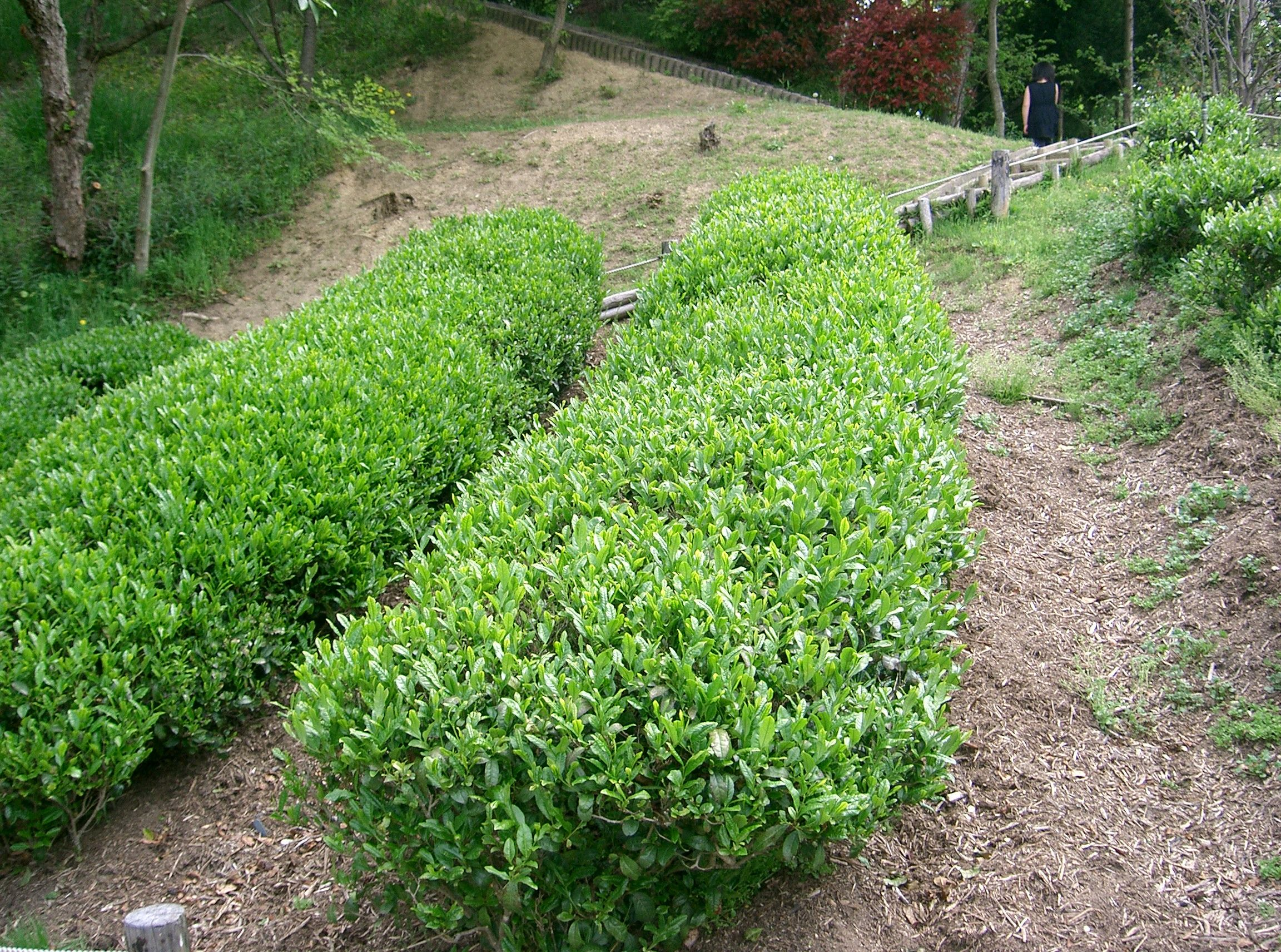
Tea bushes

People planted large amounts of tea in the mountains of Fujian, Zhejiang, and southern Anhui. Although tea had a milder environmental impact than annual crops, tea bushes could not hold soil like forest vegetation. Tea gardens were severely eroded by heavy rain. In fisheries, the Zhoushan Archipelago off Zhejiang was an important fish farming area. By the late 19th century, fish stocks were gradually depleted. Fishermen used increasingly fine-meshed nets and caught increasingly small fish.

=== Liangguang ===
Some areas of South China were among the most severely environmentally degraded places in China. After the mid-Ming, Hakka people migrated to mountainous areas across South China. They were aware of the fragility of mountain environments and would replant trees to compensate for timber that had been cut and sold to downstream regions. However, in the Qing, successive waves of Han people, squeezed out of lowlands by population pressure, moved into mountain areas. After cutting trees, they planted nutrient-demanding crops such as maize and tobacco. Official prohibitions had almost no effect in stopping forest logging and land degradation. In the Two Guang regions, it was difficult to find new arable land, so people began penetrating deep into mountains, burning forests, building dams, and constructing dikes at the Pearl River Delta to form new sand flats, quickly blocking the normal flow of rivers. Farmers across South China habitually set fire to nearby mountain slopes every dry season to drive away snakes, tigers, and bandits. This practice destroyed the vast majority of woody plants, turning forests into grasslands. A very tough cogongrass grew everywhere and choked out other vegetation. This grass also could not prevent landslides caused by heavy rain. In 1700, half of Lingnan was covered by forest, but thereafter reclamation and burning activities intensified and large areas of forest disappeared. In the early 19th century, only the northern Nanling region in Guangdong still had tigers. By the mid-19th century, there were almost no forests in inhabited areas. Only 10% of land in South China still had forest. People, seeking fuel and fodder, picked up every blade of grass and twig on the mountains: "The mountains were stripped until not a blade of grass remained; even grass roots were often dug up." Reduced forests increased flood disasters and caused greater damage.

On Hainan Island, Han people migrated slowly but steadily. By the 18th century, sugarcane and rice had become the island's two major exports. Han people left the Wuzhi Mountain area to the Li people, which became the last remaining wilderness rarely visited by humans.

=== Taiwan ===
The original vegetation on Taiwan Island was not all forest; there were also many grasslands, with deer herds everywhere. The local indigenous peoples could roughly be divided into two major groups: mountain (Gaoshan tribes) and plain (Pingpu tribes). They were not skilled at farming and mainly lived by hunting and gathering. Population density was very low. When necessary, they also practiced slash-and-burn agriculture.In the 17th century, Han people on Taiwan only settled in a corner of the southwest. The island's natural environment still retained its primitive appearance. In late 17th-century Taiwan, travelers in the countryside were completely submerged by wild plants. From the 18th century, Han immigrants gradually increased. Deer fields on the island were increasingly opened as farmland and deer numbers greatly decreased. Miasma was no longer a serious threat. Around 1720, plains south of Changhua had already been reclaimed, while north of Changhua most areas were still open woodland and wilderness. Most land development activities on Taiwan occurred in low-elevation areas—plains, basins, or river valleys. The reclamation movement did not touch the core of the forests. As the number of Han guest migrants increased, reclamation of arable land gradually expanded into mountainous areas. The Qing government attempted to separate Han and indigenous peoples. In 1722 it erected stone markers as boundaries, prohibiting Han from further migrating into the territory of Gaoshan indigenous peoples. It established a "fan boundary" separating Han and indigenous peoples. These boundaries were usually located at the junction of plains and mountains and were quite effective in blocking Han entry into mountains for logging.

Due to population pressure, the Qing government eventually conceded and no longer prohibited Han reclamation of indigenous land. At the time, the Qing court's logging targets were limited to camphor wood. There was no need to climb into high mountains, so Taiwan's forests were not heavily depleted. By the 19th century, the western plains of Taiwan had become very similar to those in Fujian and Guangdong. Large deer herds had disappeared, forests had been cleared, and Han settled agriculture had triumphed. In 1875, Shen Baozhen abolished the prohibition on crossing the fan boundary. In the following 20 years, ordinary Han people could, after paying a fee, freely use mountain forest resources. From the late 1880s, the Qing government implemented various "Opening up the Mountains and Pacifying the Aborigines" measures, breaking the previous separation between Han and indigenous peoples and allowing farmers to develop tea and camphor plantations. To produce camphor, Han people cut camphor trees in the mountains. Areas where camphor had been cut were usually converted to farmland, making forest loss irreversible. However, before the ceding of Taiwan in 1895, camphor production was not yet very large.

=== Southwest ===
Before and after the Qing occupied the southwest, merchants and the government caused great environmental damage through logging and mining (iron, copper, silver, tin, etc.). In the early 18th century, the Qing government adopted more active colonization policies and more Han people migrated into Yunnan. The Yongzheng Emperor sought to obtain mineral and timber resources in the southwest and implemented the gaitu guiliu policy. Han soldiers continued to acquire land from indigenous peoples. The introduction of American crops and reclamation techniques learned from Hakkas and shed people meant Han activities were no longer limited to river valleys but could penetrate the vast forests covering the mountains of the southwest. They rapidly cut trees. By the early 19th century, the deep mountains and dense forests of southern Yunnan had almost disappeared, replaced by dense crops and tea forests on the mountains. However, the short tea bushes were insufficient to block rainwater and protect soil. In the mid-18th century, copper mining in Yunnan reached its peak. Smelting copper required charcoal. At the height of Yunnan copper production, annual output exceeded ten million jin, requiring over 100 million jin of charcoal. As a result, forests near the mines were completely logged. Fuel exhaustion came faster than the depletion of ore deposits. Once old forests were exhausted, ecological damage further aggravated flooding.

=== Northeast ===
The Qing decided to seal off its ancestral homeland in the northeast to maintain Manchu military strength and ethnic identity. By building and planting the "Willow Palisade", it isolated Han people outside the northeast region. Although Manchus also engaged in some farming in river valleys, most of the northeast was covered with primary pine forests teeming with wild animals, including Siberian tiger, brown bear, mink, sturgeon, and stork, as well as ginseng growing in the forests. The Qing government purchased various foods from the northeast. By the early 18th century, supply shortages began to appear. Pine nuts and pine cones had once been easy to collect. By the late 18th century, the only way to obtain them was to cut down the trees. After 1822, bannermen could no longer catch bears and leopards to send to Beijing. After the Jiaqing era (1796–1820), Han migrant reclamation zones extended upstream along the Songhua River. Large-scale agriculture was already underway in Jilin. After 1860, the Qing changed policy to "migrate to strengthen the borders" in order to increase tax revenue. Large numbers of Han began migrating into the northeast. By the late Qing, the northeast population had surged to 17 million, leading to further development extending to Heilongjiang. Primary forests in the northeast were greatly depleted. When the northeast and Siberia were developed due to railway construction, China signed a treaty to supply railway ties and established two joint forestry companies. This marked the beginning of modern-style development of northeast forest resources, mainly carried out by Russian and Japanese companies.

=== Northwest ===
In the Qing northwest, grasslands shrank and were converted to farmland, with desertification accelerating. After the Kangxi era (1662–1722), reclamation expanded into mountainous areas, causing irreversible destruction of forests in Shaanxi, Gansu, Qinghai, and Ningxia. This led to soil erosion, ecological imbalance, species degradation, and even extinction. One consequence was desertification of grasslands in northern Shaanxi, Gansu, and Ningxia. Combined with warfare and burning, when the Qing used troops in the northwest it ordered the burning of pastures to defeat the enemy, severely damaging the ecological environment and forming the Mu Us Desert spanning Inner Mongolia, Shaanxi, and Ningxia. The Horquin Sandy Land and Ordos Plateau in Inner Mongolia were originally covered with grassland and forest. In the mid-Qing, large-scale land reclamation occurred and desertification began. In the mid-18th century, the Qing government introduced policies of "migrate to strengthen the borders" and "borrow land to support the people." Desert gradually formed within 100 li south of the Ming Great Wall in northern Shaanxi.In the late 19th and early 20th centuries, the Qing government and Mongol nobles sold natural grasslands originally used for grazing in the Horqin area to Han farmers. After several years of farming, the loose topsoil was blown away. Wind erosion turned farmland into desert and pastures deteriorated. Cattle herds could only be kept in constantly shrinking areas. Around 1900, the Qing court allowed and even encouraged Han colonization of Mongol regions to strengthen national defense and increase revenue. Many Mongols also became farmers.

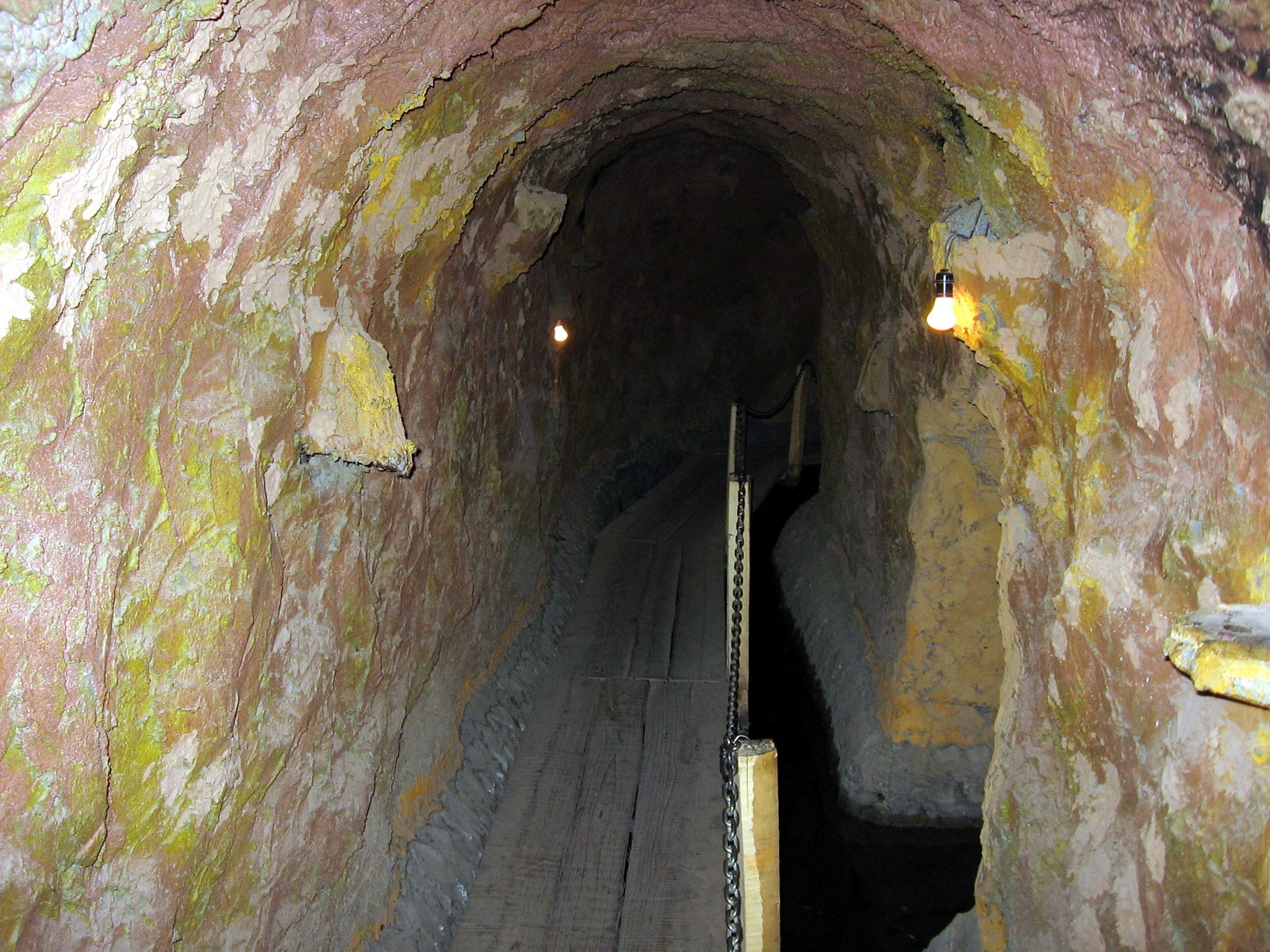
Karez in Xinjiang

In the northwest, the Qianlong Emperor defeated the Dzungar Khanate, nearly exterminating the Dzungars and leaving the Dzungar region as empty space to be filled by Han farmers, Manchu bannermen, and Hui people. Through military farms, Chinese armies transformed fertile, water-source grasslands into farmland. Where there were rivers formed by melting snow, desert land around oases in the Tarim Basin was also reclaimed. Between 1760 and 1820, more than one million mu of land were opened as fields. After these grasslands were plowed, they likely caused soil erosion and desertification of the grasslands, making recovery to their original state difficult. Natural forests in Xinjiang were distributed in the Altai Mountains and Tian Shan areas. Due to poor management and unrestricted logging, large areas of dense forest disappeared. In arid and semi-arid regions, land reclamation depended entirely on building irrigation channels. Although beneficial to farmland, these harmed neighboring water users. Xinjiang used the karez irrigation method, transporting snowmelt from the mountains to farmland, allowing deserts to prosper. In the early 1840s, Lin Zexu established irrigation channels in Xinjiang, directing water from the Tian Shan range to areas with well-organized irrigation for agricultural use. However, the project also restricted water resource use in the area, harming existing farmland and pastureland. In the Hexi Corridor region, during the mid-Qing many people entered the Qilian Mountains to log. After forests disappeared, mountain snow lost shade and melted immediately when spring warmed. Water had nowhere to be stored, causing floods. In autumn when water was needed, there was none. Thus, since the mid-Qing, the frequency of both floods and droughts in the Hexi region greatly increased.

=== West ===
In the Qing, the only human agricultural ecosystem that did not experience environmental degradation was the Sichuan Basin around Chengdu. Local agriculture was intensive and carefully cultivated trees, including bamboo, tung oil tree, mulberry, Chinese fir, lacquer tree, and various fruit trees. The local climate was humid with lush vegetation. The Chengdu Plain always had a good irrigation system. The Dujiangyan water conservancy project built in the Qin dynasty still operated well. Every farm had its own small patch of bamboo, Chinese fir, palm, tung oil tree, lacquer tree, or fruit tree forest. Many trees also grew along the Min River, creating lush greenery. Many places on the Tibetan Plateau originally had forests. Over thousands of years, these primary forests were cleared by Tibetans and replaced with low-growing plants with high regenerative capacity that could feed cattle and sheep, such as grasses, clump plants, and creeping plants. Under moderate grazing, they formed rich, knee-high low-grass vegetation. This vegetation could conserve soil and water. Although forests were cleared, mountain slopes did not become barren but became pastures for Tibetan herds, also avoiding soil erosion and ecological problems for the downstream Sichuan Basin.

== Republic of China ==
=== Mainland period ===
==== Resource problems ====
In the early 20th century, deforestation and the resulting severe soil erosion and land salinization became one of the main factors in China's underdeveloped agriculture. The Republic of China soon recognized the problem of forest resource depletion. In 1914 it promulgated the Forest Law of the Republic of China, calling on provinces to formulate afforestation plans, but the government at the time was unable to actually implement the plans. Chiang Kai-shek recognized the economic value of timber, established a national Arbor Day, and set up nurseries in Fujian to provide seedlings. The tree-planting policy had some success in greening along the Min River, but after the outbreak of the Second Sino-Japanese War in 1937, the Nationalist government's afforestation projects could not continue. The desert on the Ordos Plateau continued to expand, especially in the first decade of the Republic, when desert in Suiyuan increased fourfold. In the 1920s, large numbers of Han migrated to Mongolia. Game, pine trees, and sheep herds in the mountains became increasingly scarce, changing the grassland ecology. By the 1930s, Han people had reclaimed all land suitable for grazing. After the good topsoil was blown away by strong winds, only sand remained. In the 1930s, forests in the Lingnan region had also been completely logged. Only 1%–5% of the land was forested.

In the northeast, agricultural settlements expanded from the south. In 1914, one-quarter of northeast wasteland had been reclaimed. Most Han migrating to the northeast stayed in agricultural areas on the Liaodong Peninsula and did not penetrate further into the northern and mountainous wilderness and forests. By the 1930s, half of the northeast's cultivable land had still not been reclaimed, but Han people did not protect forests and only logged slowly. In the early 20th century, Russia and Japan carried out unprecedented widespread destruction of northeast forests. Under Japanese rule, many forests were cleared, including vast camphor forests. In the 1930s and 1940s, Japan plundered 70 million cubic meters of timber from the northeast, accounting for one-tenth of China's total timber reserves at the time. In East China Sea fisheries, in the early Republic fishermen repeatedly fished the same nearshore fishing grounds year after year, leading to local depletion of fishery resources and increasingly small and thin fish. Japanese trawlers overfished in the Yellow Sea, reducing catches for Chinese fishing boats. Fishermen used very fine-mesh nets, catching large numbers of juvenile fish and fish eggs, leading to the collapse of nearshore fish stocks. By the 1930s, productivity of the yellow croaker fishing grounds around the Zhoushan Archipelago had clearly declined. Facing Japanese competition, Chinese fishermen caught as much as possible without considering resource protection. During the 1940s War of Resistance, both Chinese and Japanese fisheries declined sharply, temporarily allowing fish stocks to recover.

==== Floods and river management ====
The Yellow River flooded area after the 1938 Huayuankou dike breach

In the early Republic, the frequency and scale of natural disasters far exceeded those of any previous Chinese dynasty. Environmental deterioration, especially siltation of major river systems, was unprecedented. The accumulated consequences of centuries of forest over-logging, intensive land reclamation, and excessive river control created unprecedented environmental problems. The death toll from large-scale natural disasters in the first half of the 20th century exceeded that of any period in recent centuries. The Yellow River dikes frequently breached. The Yangtze experienced a massive flood in 1931. Grain yields in the 1930s were lower than in the Qing. Further deterioration of the river system suppressed productivity growth. Dongting Lake's area shrank dramatically, while floods along the Yangtze increased, leading to the 1931 Yangtze Great Flood that inundated five provinces and killed millions. The Nationalist government attempted to establish a centralized unified agency to manage the Huai River and founded the Huai River Water Resources Commission in 1927. However, the Nationalist government's ability to implement Huai River water conservancy plans in the 1930s was constrained by difficulties in controlling local resources. Although some projects were completed, they were smaller and slower than originally envisioned. In 1938, Chiang Kai-shek ordered the breaching of the major dike on the south bank of the Yellow River near Huayuankou, exacerbating difficulties downstream on the Huai and destroying most of the previously built water conservancy projects.

In the early stage of the War of Resistance, to slow the Japanese army's advance, Chiang Kai-shek ordered the breaching of the Yellow River dike northeast of Zhengzhou on June 9, 1938, allowing floodwaters to pour over approximately 70,000 square kilometers of land in the Huai River, Hongze Lake, and Grand Canal basins. The flood rushed southeast, eventually dispersing into narrow, shallow branches that joined the Huai River, inundating land on both the east and west sides of the Huai. The flood submerged 45% of villages in eastern Henan, deposited about 100 million tons of silt, caused over 800,000 deaths in Henan, Anhui, and Jiangsu, and displaced nearly 4 million people. After the flood receded, silt buried large areas of farmland, making them uncultivable. In some flooded areas, Yellow River flooding raised the groundwater table, causing the covered land to undergo salinization. Salinization destroyed seedlings, hindered crop growth, and reduced harvests. During the famine, people ate tree leaves and bark, further reducing trees. Several years later, the Yellow River channel still shifted and large amounts of farmland remained silted with river water and sediment. By 1946, the Yellow River finally returned to its northern old course. After the war, people in Henan cut down all small trees and shrubs and collected all rice straw to sell as fuel. After the breach, many Henan refugees fled to Shaanxi. Both the Kuomintang and Communists tried hard to reclaim land there. From 1937 to 1945, forest cover in all of Shaanxi decreased from 25% to 16%. Under Nationalist government resettlement, 25,000 refugees went to the Huanglong Mountain area in Shaanxi to reclaim wasteland. In 1942–1943, another 200,000 people moved to the Huanglong Mountain reclamation zone. Refugees cleared local trees, shrubs, and grass to plant grain, maize, potatoes, and buckwheat. Within a few years, soil erosion and soil nutrient depletion appeared.

=== Taiwan period ===
==== Logging ====
The second half of the 20th century was the period of most severe depletion of Taiwan's forest vegetation area. Logging scale was largest between 1954 and 1972. From 1964 onward, the annual logged area exceeded 10,000 hectares—meaning the total logged area in two consecutive years exceeded the entire Japanese colonial era. At this time, large-scale logging aimed to earn foreign exchange, with timber exports focusing on high-value species such as red cypress, Taiwan cedar, and false cypress. The ability to carry out large-scale logging at this time relied on improvements in logging tools and changes in transportation. In the Japanese colonial era, railways were the main transport method, limiting the amount of timber that could be removed from forests. But after the Daxueshan Forestry Company began operations in 1958, forest roads were opened and large trucks were used to transport timber. This allowed far deeper penetration into forests than railways, not only causing faster forest depletion but also more severe damage to mountain soil and water conservation. In addition to logging, the government also engaged in afforestation, but due to limited seedling survival rates and the time required for trees to grow, forests still suffered net loss. Over the 18 years from 1954 to 1972, forest area lost more than 100,000 hectares, about 3% of the island's total area. In 1968, forest area was approximately 2.22 million hectares, accounting for about 55% of the island's total area. As the economy began to industrialize and no longer relied on the agricultural and forestry sectors to earn foreign exchange, logging speed slowed from 1972 onward. By the 1990s, logging had in principle stopped, and old forest farms were converted into forest recreation areas. In conservation, to protect mountain forests, in the 1980s the Taiwan government successively established national parks such as Kenting, Yu Shan, Yangmingshan, and Taroko. Civil conservation groups designated 1999 as the Year of Forest Culture and launched a forest protection movement. After 2000, illegal logging and reclamation still occurred, but the proportion of area affected was not high.

==== Water pollution ====
Taiwan's water pollution sources are mainly divided into three categories: municipal wastewater, industrial wastewater, and livestock wastewater. In the 1970s, industrial wastewater was the main source of water pollution. In early 1986, continuous mass die-offs of farmed oysters and tiger shripms fry occurred along Taiwan's southwestern coast. The root cause was water quality pollution. The government immediately legislated continuous daily fines for major polluting industries or factories in severely polluted river basins that frequently discharged sewage without improvement, to prompt polluters to improve anti-pollution equipment as soon as possible. Since 1993, total wastewater volume has gradually decreased. The proportions of industrial wastewater and livestock wastewater have relatively declined, while the proportion of municipal wastewater has relatively increased. Taking 2017 as an example, total sewage discharge was 657.47 million tons per day, of which municipal sewage reached 531.58 million tons per day (80.85%), industrial wastewater only 55.25 million tons per day (8.4%), and agricultural wastewater 70.65 million tons per day (10.75%). At present, industrial wastewater in Taiwan has been brought under considerable control. As for municipal wastewater treatment rates, the whole of Taiwan had only 33.7% at the end of 2006, showing that construction of sewage sewers urgently needs strengthening to reduce municipal wastewater. Various wastewaters are discharged or seep from pollution sources, polluting rivers, reservoirs, groundwater, and marine water bodies. In 1987, the length of severely polluted rivers accounted for 11.4%. In 2003, river pollution reached its peak, with severely polluted sections accounting for 15.8%. Thereafter, over the more than ten years from 2004 to 2017, river pollution levels improved, accounting for only 7.6–3.5%. However, improvements in river water quality, apart from pH value, are still far from ideal.

==== Environmental protection ====
From the 1970s, Taiwan began to pay attention to environmental pollution and ecological conservation issues, and from the 1990s onward placed greater emphasis on environmental protection and sustainable development. From the 1970s, environmental issues became openly discussed social problems. People began to believe that public hazards and pollution were important problems in Taiwan and that weak public authority was the main cause of environmental deterioration. In the 1980s, the environmental movement arose. Civil movements opposing government environmental policies continued to appear, repeatedly changing government development policies. From 1971 onward, the government successively formulated new environmental laws and regulations, including the National Park Law, Air Pollution Control Act, Slopeland Conservation and Utilization Regulations, etc. For coastal environmental protection, in the 1980s the government announced and implemented the "Taiwan Coastal Natural Environment Protection Plan" as the management basis for 12 protected areas including the Tamsui River mouth. After the establishment of the Environmental Protection Administration, Executive Yuan in 1987, the government made greater efforts in environmental protection. In the same year, the Executive Yuan issued the Current Stage Environmental Protection Policy Guidelines, setting the goal of "protecting the natural environment, maintaining ecological balance, and seeking sustainable use across generations" and stating that citizens and industries have the responsibility to work with the government on environmental protection. Environmental protection and economic development should be considered together. Before 1990, government enforcement of environmental regulations was low. Long-term low-level control meant businesses had no incentive to complete required matters according to law, leading to serious heavy pollution. Only after 1990 did enforcement improve. To prevent air pollution, Taiwan established 85 air quality monitoring stations and set air pollution indicators. In the 2000s, increases in the number of days with air quality monitoring and good ratios showed that air quality had improved. In wildlife protection, by 2009 Taiwan had established 85 nature reserves with a total area exceeding one million hectares, including 17 wildlife protection areas.

== People's Republic of China ==
=== Logging ===
In 1950, forest cover in China had shrunk to 5%–10% (one source says 8.19%). On a per capita basis, China's forest resources ranked 120th among 160 countries worldwide. Taking Hainan Island as an example, in 1950 25% of the island still had forest cover. In the following 20 years, government development plans reduced the forest proportion to 7%. After 1949, there were four large-scale forest logging episodes in China: 1. the Great Leap Forward; 2. the "Grain is the Key Link" and the "Learn from Dazhai" movement during the Cultural Revolution; 3. the 1980s dissolution of agricultural collectives and introduction of the household responsibility system; 4. state-owned forest farms and China's nature reserves profiting from forest resources in the 1990s. Mainland Chinese farmers called the first three logging episodes the "Three Great Loggings." During the Great Leap Forward, there were approximately 600,000 small steel furnaces, all requiring charcoal supplied by cutting local forests. To provide fuel for small iron-smelting furnaces, large areas of forest were destroyed. The backyard furnace policy consumed 10% of the forests in China. During the Cultural Revolution, the government openly viewed forests as an inefficient use of land that should give way to grain or fruit trees. It also proposed "take grain as the key link" and "ask grain from barren mountains," resulting in large areas of forest being destroyed, especially in southwestern provinces such as Yunnan and Sichuan. In the past the middle reaches of the Yangtze had clear water flow, but due to large-scale human damage to remaining woodlands in the Sichuan Basin, by the late 1960s the river was quite turbid year-round.

In the early reform and opening-up period, both farmland and forest land were transferred to contracting farm households. Serious illegal forest logging occurred in southern and southwestern provinces to obtain timber for house construction. Between 1981 and 1985, house construction alone consumed 195 million cubic meters of timber, equivalent to the entire annual growth of forest trees. In the 1980s and 1990s, due to huge demand for chopsticks, furniture, and paper, timber output rose sharply. In the mid-1990s, among 140 forest districts nationwide, 25 had completely exhausted their trees and 61 had logging rates exceeding recovery rates. Between 1992 and 1998, state-owned forestry companies used heavy machinery and chainsaws to log large areas in western Sichuan, the headwaters of the Yangtze, northwestern Yunnan, the Qinling, and the Heilongjiang basin, selling the timber. After the major 1998 Yangtze flood, the State Council of the People's Republic of China announced a ban on forest logging in western Sichuan. The ban was later expanded to other areas. However, China continued rapid development and consumption of forest resources, and the natural environment continued to deteriorate. At the end of the 20th century, per capita timber reserves were approximately 10 cubic meters per person—only one-eighth of the world average. After the People's Republic of China joined the World Trade Organization, some multinational companies from Japan and Taiwan also became involved in China's timber logging industry. In the early 21st century, the People's Republic of China became the world's largest exporter of wood products.

=== Afforestation ===
Beginning in 1900, China's governments mobilized labor and resources to plant trees. The People's Republic of China was the first to make significant progress in afforestation.

Forests in China mainly exist in northern Northeast China, southwestern Yunnan, the border of western Sichuan and eastern Tibet, the border of western Hubei and northeastern Sichuan, central-southern Fujian, and the Qinling mountain range. Buddhist temples preserved into the late 20th century mostly maintained a tranquil atmosphere and surrounding forests. In addition, there were two mountainous areas where people planted trees: in the border mountains of Zhejiang and Jiangxi, merchants planted trees to sell as fuel to Jingdezhen kilns; in the southern Hunan and northern Two Guang mountain areas, both Miao and Han would replant trees after logging.To solve environmental degradation problems, the People's Republic of China carried out many tree-planting afforestation projects. The government began planting trees on wasteland and mountain slopes, but results were not great. Actual seedling survival rates were below 30%. The earliest coastal shelterbelt system construction began in the 1950s, aimed at stabilizing barren coastal mountains in coastal provinces. During the Great Leap Forward, a soil and water conservation movement was carried out, planting large-scale windbreak forest belts, but only 30% of the windbreak forests survived. Due to afforestation campaigns or natural regeneration, forests slowly recovered somewhat after the Great Leap Forward. In the 1960s, most tree-planting plans were unsuccessful. More than half of the trees died due to lack of water. The trees that survived were often plundered by local farmers for fuel and building materials. Afforestation and protection work during the Mao Zedong era increased forest cover to 12.7%.

The Taihang Mountains greening project in the 1980s had little effect. Another afforestation project in the middle and upper reaches of the Yangtze began in the mid-1990s. Between 1980 and 2000, forest cover rose to 18%. This was because the establishment of private property rights promoted afforestation work and also due to the huge Three-North Shelter Forest project. The Three-North Shelter Forest is the largest greening project in China. It carried out afforestation work on 37 million hectares of arid grassland from Heilongjiang to Xinjiang, stretching from the western Kashgar region to the eastern Greater Khingan Range, covering an area of more than 4 million square kilometers. However, the actual forest area was far lower than officially published figures. For example, the 1979 actual figure was one-third less than published. Hundreds of thousands of mu of seedlings, whether dead or alive, were counted as forest cover. The Three-North Shelter Forest project hoped to stop the desert from continuing to spread southeastward into North China. But the newly planted trees had very low survival rates and groundwater levels were also dropping severely. Desertification continued in the Three-North Shelter Forest region, raising doubts about whether the project could ultimately succeed. From 1999, the People's Republic of China government implemented the "Grain for Green" measure, converting farmland to forest and providing subsidies and tree-planting fees to affected farmers. However, the plan sometimes failed due to inappropriate tree species selection. Overall, under the Grain for Green program, China's forest cover increased from 20% in 2000 to nearly 23% in 2020, with a reforestation area of approximately 24 million hectares.

Forests under People's Republic of China government statistics are often composed of single tree species rather than the multi-species mixtures of natural forests. Single-species forests, whether pine, poplar, eucalyptus, or rubber tree, are more like plantations and cannot support wild species survival. For example, in Yunnan, rubber plantations replaced tropical rainforest. Although they could supply valuable rubber, they destroyed the habitat of gibbons. Such vegetation can conserve soil and water and achieve carbon capture and storage, but few animals can grow healthily in it. The current situation is more trees but fewer forests. Various afforestation projects have planted large numbers of seedlings, but even when they successfully grow, they are more like farms than forests. It is reported that in the northeast state-owned forest region, approximately 3.5 million hectares of forest have been artificially planted. At the same time, due to mountain closure for natural regeneration, 4.1 million hectares of secondary forest have been restored. However, most of these forests are artificial plantations, making it difficult to achieve biodiversity protection. Measures rewarding farm households for planting trees mostly yield economic-type forests (such as fruit trees) rather than rebuilding healthy forests.

=== National nature reserves ===
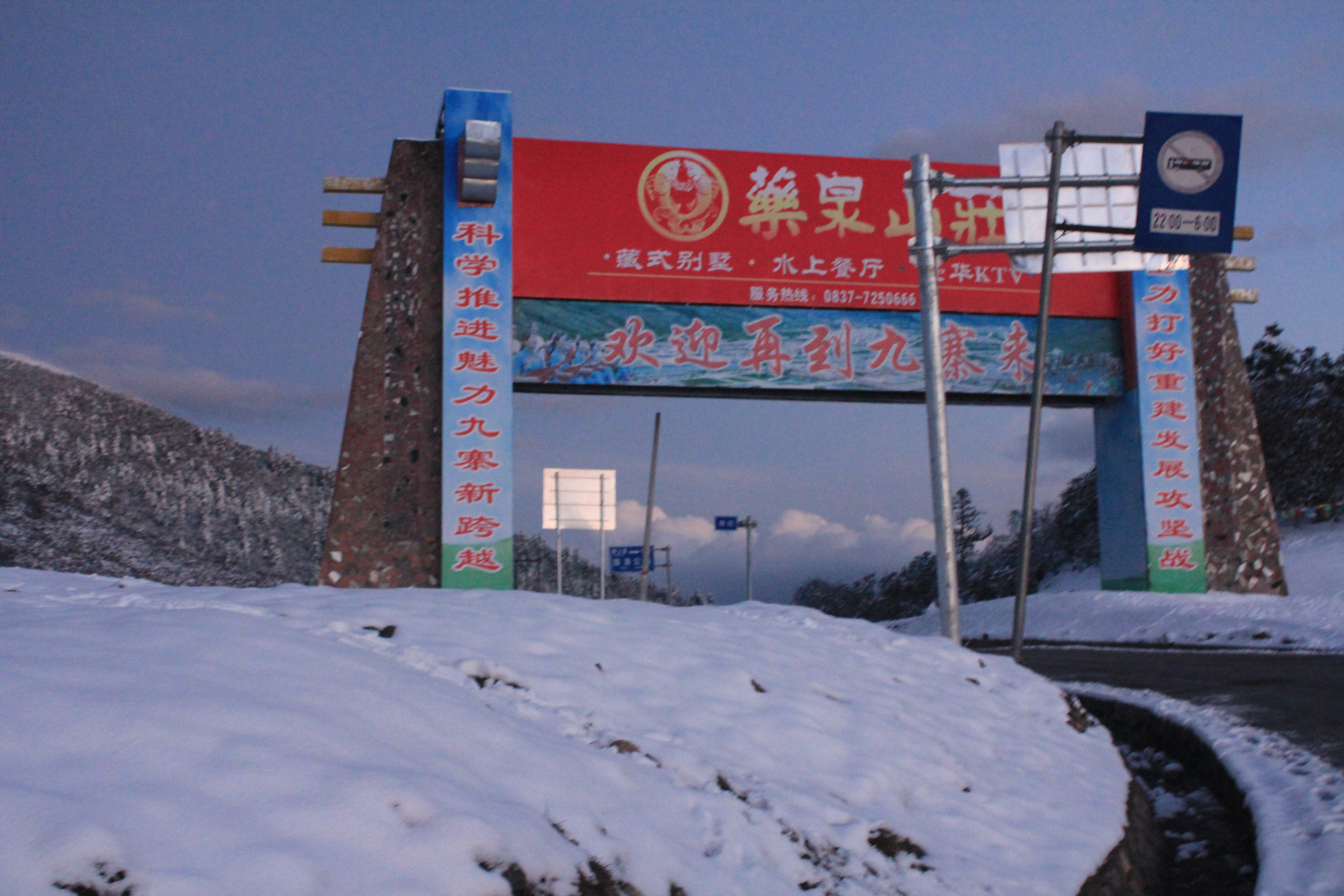
Wanglang National Nature Reserve

Some government officials intended to establish forest protection zones and wildlife protection zones. The earliest established Dinghu Mountain reserve in 1956 was located in Zhaoqing, Guangdong. In the 1980s, the number of reserves increased rapidly. From the 1990s, some primary or endangered species habitats were designated as nature reserves. By 2004 there were more than 2,000, accounting for nearly 14% of total land area. The most important forest protection zones were mostly Buddhist temples in the south. Among the People's Republic of China's nature reserves, the most internationally concerned are those dedicated to protecting giant pandas, such as the Wanglang National Nature Reserve in Pingwu County, Sichuan. Although China has established more than two thousand nature reserves and an increasing number of "national parks," many of them do not actually operate. Some national parks have no forest rangers at all. Nature reserves lack state supporting funds. One-third of them are only "parks on paper," with no actual markers or boundaries. Many officials responsible for managing reserves live in county towns rather than inside the reserves. Due to lack of funds, administrators "develop their own industries." Eco-tourism has attracted illegal harvesting and poaching of wild plants and animals. Road construction has interfered with local ecosystems. The limited funds are used to build hotels. Administrators even sign contracts with companies to develop resources in the reserves, such as converting lakes and swamps into fish and shrimp farming ponds. Forests continue to be logged and tigers are illegally hunted. Reserves prioritize protecting tourists and rarely catch poaching criminals. Protected areas are often set too small. Logging, road building, and fish farming fragment the reserve's ecosystem into isolated islands under siege.

=== Land degradation ===
What the Chinese Communist Party inherited was a severely degraded natural environment. In 1950, almost all cultivated land lacked some key nutrients, especially nitrogen. Farmers could no longer supplement nitrogen fertilizer to increase grain yields. They could not provide surplus funds for industrialization and even had problems feeding the growing population. During the Great Leap Forward, rural areas in places such as North China were extremely barren—even rats could not be found. The natural environment of the North China Plain was already extremely degraded and impoverished, with no habitat left to sustain any wild animals. The disappearance of wild species meant the complete collapse of the entire natural ecosystem. One reason agricultural productivity could not increase substantially was the shortage of chemical fertilizer. In 1949, China had only two chemical fertilizer plants. Several more were later built, but chemical fertilizer remained in short supply. After U.S. President Richard Nixon visited China in 1972, the first commercial agreement signed was to introduce 13 sets of the world's largest-scale synthetic ammonia plants for nitrogen-based fertilizer production to China. By the 1980s, the People's Republic of China had developed the ability to build its own chemical fertilizer plants. Large-scale use of chemical fertilizer greatly increased agricultural output. Before 1976, total grain output in China did increase, but at the cost of expanding agriculture into more marginal areas and further destroying forests, grasslands, and water bodies. From 1949 to 1980, total cultivated land in China increased by 50%, reaching 120–130 million hectares. New cultivated land mainly came from forests in the northeast and Yunnan, and grasslands in Inner Mongolia, Gansu, and Xinjiang. In these 30 years, the amount of newly reclaimed land almost equaled the total land reclaimed from the Han to the Song dynasties. Land reclamation led to environmental degradation.

Water conservancy construction during the Great Leap Forward was inefficient and triggered problems such as waterlogging and land salinization. The construction of reservoirs and irrigation canals hindered drainage. Due to soil water saturation, salt and other minerals were brought to the surface, bringing disastrous effects on soil fertility. Due to poor drainage, two-thirds of irrigated land on the North China Plain was threatened by salinization. Cultivated land in Hebei, Henan, and Shandong once experienced salinization on 1.9–3.2 million hectares. Desert and severely degraded land accounted for one-quarter of the country's land area. Since 1970, the rate of desertification had doubled. Through tree planting and returning farmland to grassland, the government tried to curb desertification, but results were unsatisfactory. 30% of the population lived in areas affected by desertification. In the late 1990s, North China experienced an average of 35 sandstorms per year.

=== Grassland ===
Agricultural collectivization and the Great Leap Forward in the 1950s both accelerated grassland degradation. In 1965, the area of degraded grassland reached more than one million hectares. During the Cultural Revolution, the government proposed "Grain is the Key Link." Even grasslands in North and Northwest China without irrigation facilities were used for cultivation. With wind erosion of soil, these newly reclaimed farmland quickly turned into desert. The "take grain as the key link" policy caused large areas of grassland to be destroyed by reclamation activities. Herders themselves also damaged grasslands. A five-person herder family burned 5–8 kilograms of sand sagebrush grass daily as domestic fuel. In one year this equaled the destruction of 10–16 mu of fixed grassland. It is estimated that 28% of the total desertified area in China resulted from herders burning grass. Compared with the 1950s, national grass yield in the 1980s declined by 30–50%. As a result, livestock suffered nutritional deficiencies and large numbers died. Severe desertification occurred in both the Hexi Corridor and the Ordos Plateau. Due to over-reclamation and overgrazing, grassland area continued to shrink. In the 1970s the annual loss was about 1,560 square kilometers; in the 1990s it increased to 2,460 square kilometers. By 2000, more than one-quarter of China's land had turned into desert. In the 1980s, international market demand for cashmere surged. Herders began replacing sheep with goats. Unlike sheep, which only eat grass, goats also eat the roots and stems of shrubs when grazing. This was a major cause of grassland desertification.

In 2002, the government promulgated the Grassland Law of the People's Republic of China to stop desertification, but results were limited. Mobile sand dunes continued to increase and wild animals decreased. After 2000, international market demand for ephedra grass surged. Grassland herders therefore expanded ephedra planting, even abandoning grazing. Ephedra planting aggravated vegetation consumption and desertification. In Inner Mongolia, the nomadic lifestyle is actually better adapted to the local mixed grassland and sandy terrain, but the traditional nomadic life of Mongols is disappearing. The vast majority no longer raise horses. Since 1950, environmental degradation has reduced grassland area by 30%–50%. In the early 21st century, of approximately 400 million hectares of grassland, more than 90% had degraded or been overgrazed, and more than 50% had moderate to severe degradation, leading to reduced biodiversity and lowered capacity to conserve water sources.

=== River management and water control ===
The first major river water conservancy plan proposed by the People's Republic of China government was the Huai River plan. From 1950, the plan involved digging upstream reservoirs, reinforcing dams in the middle and lower reaches, and improving flood storage and discharge capacity in the lower reaches. In the summer of 1950, a flood occurred on the Huai River. Mao Zedong called for the Huai River to be repaired well, launching a mass movement to control the Huai with the slogan "make high mountains bow their heads and rivers give way." In the following seven years, the government mobilized millions of farmers who used iron shovels to remove earth, clearing 170 kilometers of river channel leading to the sea, digging and building a new entrance for the Huai into the Yangtze, flood storage reservoirs, and flood control dikes. But in 1954 a major flood still occurred locally. The initial task of the project was only flood discharge, but later the government believed water should be stored for irrigation. Many earthen dams were added on Huai tributaries to form reservoirs. In the end, approximately 4,000 reservoirs were built throughout the Huai River basin. However, the quality of Huai River projects during and after the Great Leap Forward was poor. The 1975 collapse of two large dams built during the Great Leap Forward and the 1991 Huai River flood showed that some river facilities were below standard. In August 1975, the most destructive reservoir dam failure disaster in world history occurred in the Huai River basin. After heavy rain, dams on two Huai tributaries overtopped and breached. Floodwaters swept away villages. Downstream flood diversion zones could not absorb the huge volume of floodwater, and dikes collapsed one after another, forming a lake nearly 160 kilometres (100 mi) long. 11 million people were affected and more than 80,000 died.

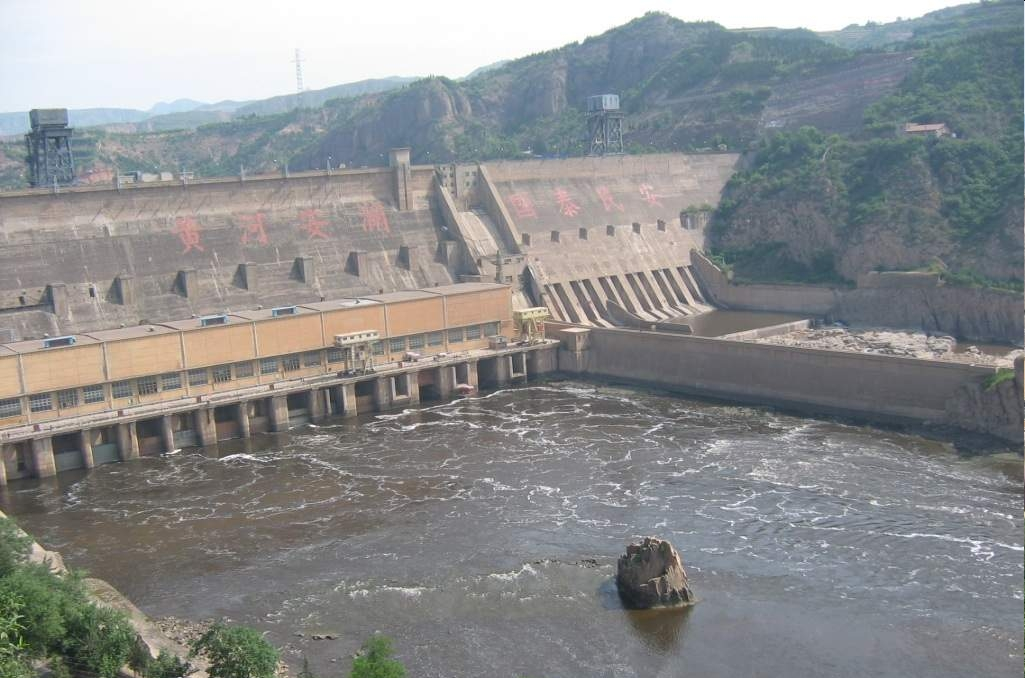
Sanmenxia Dam

The 1954–1955 Yellow River management plan had ambitious goals: building large and small reservoirs on the Yellow River main stream, tributaries, and gullies of the Loess Plateau to achieve flood control, irrigation, power generation, and sand control. In 1957, construction of the Yellow River Sanmenxia Dam began. The Sanmenxia project became a powerful symbol of the Party's ability to battle heaven and earth. By the end of 1961, serious problems occurred at the Sanmenxia Dam. Sediment siltation speed far exceeded expectations. Because the reservoir slowed upstream flow, sediment began depositing upstream. The dam was located on the river section after the Wei River joined the Yellow River. It began operating in 1962. Hundreds of thousands of mu of farmland on both banks of the lower Wei River were flooded, and nearly 300,000 farmers were relocated to poorer western areas. In the reservoir, Yellow River sediment rapidly accumulated, making generator sets unable to operate and further blocking the Wei River upstream, causing flooding around Xi'an. Wei River drainage capacity decreased, directly threatening the safety of Xi'an city. As a result, it was decided that during the rainy season flood period, all diversion gates would be fully opened to release flood peaks. This once again exposed the lower Yellow River region to threats of flood and sediment. The dream of a "clear Yellow River" was shattered. The dam eventually became riddled with holes and was almost worthless for both flood control and power generation.

Many lakes and ponds in China have disappeared, requiring the state to build artificial reservoirs to store rainwater and irrigate farmland. Due to the construction of large reservoirs in the middle and upper reaches of the Yellow River, large-scale water resource development and utilization occurred in the upper, middle, and lower reaches. There was a lack of unified coordination for water storage and diversion. Combined with dry weather, from 1990 the Yellow River began experiencing annual drying up. Increased water demand for agriculture, industry, and cities greatly reduced Yellow River water volume and slowed flow, accelerating sediment accumulation in the river. In the 1990s, about 90% of sediment deposited on the riverbed of the North China Plain. When the river dried, 100% of the sediment accumulated on the riverbed. The lower Yellow River formed a "suspended river". Near Kaifeng, the riverbed was 10 meters higher than the surrounding plain. The number of days the Yellow River ran dry increased year by year. In 1997 it reached 136 days. The dry riverbed extended more than 700 kilometers from the sea mouth, near Zhengzhou, Henan. In the 1980s, the four main tributaries of the Huai River experienced drying every year, with an average dry period of 200 days. River drying led to environmental deterioration at the sea mouth, accelerated sediment accumulation, seawater intrusion, and interrupted water supply. To repair the mistakes of the Sanmenxia Dam, the government built another dam, the Xiaolangdi Dam, about 130 kilometers downstream of Sanmenxia. It began operating in 2000. Through water and sediment regulation procedures, it effectively reduced sediment in the lower Yellow River. The Yellow River has not dried up again since 1999. The Three Gorges Dam on the Yangtze was completed and began storing water in 2009. It was regarded by the People's Republic of China government as the highest achievement in water resource utilization. The Three Gorges Dam was built west of Yichang, with a height exceeding 180 metres (600 ft) and width 2.4 kilometres (1.5 mi), forming the world's largest reservoir. The project's purpose was flood control for the Yangtze basin and power supply for 400 million residents in central China. However, the Three Gorges project caused environmental problems such as habitat fragmentation and species loss. Large carnivores in the area have all disappeared, and the Chinese paddlefish has become extinct.

In the 1950s, large-scale lake enclosure occurred around Dongting Lake, greatly reducing water area—at its peak more than 200 square kilometers per year. After 1958, enclosure activities stopped, but due to rapid silt accumulation in the lake, conditions continued to deteriorate. The Great Leap Forward movement also encouraged filling lakes and wetlands to create fields in areas such as Dongting Lake and Poyang Lake. In 1985, the entire water area of Dongting Lake was less than one-seventh of the early Ming and less than half of 1932. The 1950s lake destruction for farmland was not limited to Dongting Lake but affected the entire Jianghan Plain, with unprecedented destructive power. In Hubei Province, there were still 1,066 lakes in the early 1950s with a water area of 12.5 million mu. By 1977, 740 lakes had been filled and water area had decreased by 72%. By 1985, only 192 lakes remained.

=== Water resource problems ===
China faces water resource shortage and imbalance. There are major differences in water resources between North and South China. The annual runoff of rivers on the North China Plain accounts for only 6% of the national total, while cultivated land accounts for 41% of the national total. China's freshwater is only 6% of the world's freshwater supply. The North China Plain once had hundreds of lakes and swamps in ancient times. By the 1980s, only 20 remained. In the mid-Qing, there were still five large lakes in the imperial hunting ground south of Beijing. Today they have all disappeared. On the North China Plain, due to insufficient reservoir storage and irrigation capacity, from the 1960s the state dug mechanical wells everywhere in North China to extract groundwater. The Yellow River began drying in the early 1970s. With tight surface water supply, people turned to large-scale groundwater extraction. From the reform and opening period in 1978, China accelerated water resource utilization. By 1985, the number of electric wells had approached 700,000. Entering the 21st century, the number of wells increased to 3.6 million. However, this irrigation increased salt content in the soil. In the early 1980s it caused "secondary soil salinization" problems. Water resource shortage remains a serious problem in North China. Rivers are gradually drying up, lakes continue to shrink, and some can no longer support fish survival. The Yellow River's annual runoff to the sea is becoming smaller and smaller, frequently experiencing dry sections up to 800 kilometres (500 mi) long. In some areas, groundwater levels have dropped to 90 meters below the surface.

In the second half of the 20th century, as irrigation expanded in North China—especially the use of tube well irrigation—groundwater levels dropped, soil salinization intensified, and the environment further degraded. The People's Republic of China government carried out water conservancy construction campaigns. Irrigated area jumped from 16 million hectares in 1947 to 45 million hectares in 1977. From the 1960s to the 1980s, predatory use of surface water resources for irrigation occurred. The North China Plain faced near exhaustion of surface water, so large-scale groundwater extraction was used to maintain agricultural development. The government introduced and promoted small water pump technology for pumping. This high-intensity groundwater extraction is unsustainable. In the western part of the North China Plain, shallow groundwater levels dropped from about 1 meter in the 1950s to more than 20 meters in the 1980s and 30 meters in the 1990s. Irrigation channels leaked, losing large amounts of water and further raising nearby groundwater levels, making the water shortage even more severe. By 2009, excessive groundwater use had caused more than 40,000 square kilometers of land to subside.

To solve the North China water shortage problem, China implemented the South–North Water Transfer Project. Approved for construction in 2002, it plans to divert water from the south to the northwest and North China Plain through three routes, to be completed over 50 years. This is the largest water conservancy project in world history. Through eastern, central, and western routes, water resources from the Yangtze basin are pumped and transported to northern regions. The eastern route mainly uses the Grand Canal to lift water from Jiangsu northward. The central route first diverts water from the Danjiangkou Reservoir on the Han River (China), with long-term plans to divert from the Three Gorges Dam on the Yangtze. The western route diverts water from the Tibetan Plateau to the upper Yellow River to irrigate local farmland. In 2011, the South–North Water Transfer Project began supplying water to some midway locations on the eastern and central routes. Rising temperatures in the Himalaya region cause more ice and snow to melt, temporarily increasing water flow at the sources, but in the long term melting volumes will decline, further aggravating water shortages in areas such as the Yellow River basin.

=== Pollution ===
In the late 1980s and 1990s, the central government encouraged rural industrial development and township and village enterprises were established one after another. Although the People's Republic of China had formulated extensive environmental laws and regulations aimed at controlling pollution, the government placed economic development first and environmental regulations were rarely implemented. As a result, township and village enterprises became serious pollution sources. In the early 21st century, China became one of the most polluted economies in the world. Of the world's 30 most polluted cities, China accounted for 20. Acid rain affected one-third of the country's land. It is estimated that the cost paid for environmental pollution and deterioration in the 2000s accounted for 8%–12% of gross national product each year.

==== Water quality ====
In the 1980s–1990s, China underwent rapid industrialization, but due to lack of supervision, factories openly discharged sewage into rivers, causing serious environmental disasters. Industrial water use by township and village enterprises was extensive, with low water resource utilization efficiency and large amounts of pollutants discharged. The vast majority of sewage from township and village enterprises was discharged directly into lakes and rivers without treatment. In 2002, only 24% of China's 62 billion tons of sewage was treated. Conservative estimates put annual wastewater discharge from township and village enterprises at over 10 billion tons. Waterborne diseases were the leading cause of death for children under five. Even when local enterprises installed sewage control equipment under central government pressure, subsequent investment in equipment maintenance often did not follow. In rural areas, 500 million people drank polluted water. Many residents were infected and died from carcinogens produced and spread by industry, forming more than 600 "cancer villages" nationwide. Continuous expansion of inorganic chemical fertilizer use in agricultural production further aggravated water resource deterioration. Nitrogen fertilizer consumption grew from 2.865 trillion grams in 1998 to 24.8 trillion grams in 2008, polluting surface water and groundwater. Nitrogen flowing into rivers, lakes, and ponds accounted for 2%–5% of all nitrogen fertilizer. Waste slag from coal mine extraction was left in the open. Toxic and harmful components gradually seeped underground, also polluting water sources.

The Huai River is the most seriously polluted river in China. Sewage accumulated in reservoirs, becoming increasingly concentrated. In the upper Huai River, local officials constantly opened dam gates to let sewage drain downstream, poisoning downstream crops and fish. With more than 4,000 reservoirs built along the river, the Huai's pollution discharge capacity was limited, making the problem even more serious. River water in many areas along the banks was undrinkable. In July 2001, an environmental disaster occurred on the Huai River plain. Heavy rain on a Huai tributary discharged more than 90 billion liters of heavily polluted water into the Huai. The river was filled with garbage, yellow foam, and floating dead fish. This event caused the People's Republic of China's Huai River management efforts to come to nothing. Two years later, Huai River water quality was still unsuitable for drinking or fish farming. In the late 2000s, more than 60% of Huai River water was only Grade 4 or worse, unsuitable for drinking, fish farming, or even industrial water standards. In 2009, 25% of the Yellow River water system failed to meet Grade V standards (unsuitable for human drinking or agricultural irrigation). There were few living things in Shanghai's Huangpu River. The river water was mixed with large amounts of chemicals and emitted a foul odor in warm weather. In 2007, a chemical plant near Tai Lake discharged sewage, causing increased nitrogen and phosphorus content and eutrophication in the lake, resulting in large-scale blue-green algae pollution. More than 2 million residents lost their drinking water source.

==== Air ====
Rapid expansion of industrialization made air pollution in China possibly the most serious in the world. In the 2000s, seven of the world's ten cities with the most serious air pollution were in China. To promote industrialization, China needed to supply large amounts of electricity and once built coal-fired power plants at a rate of nearly one per week. In 1989, the People's Republic of China had already surpassed the Soviet Union to become the world's largest coal producer, burning nearly 1 billion tons of coal annually for power generation. Poor-quality, unwashed coal caused particulate pollution. Inefficient combustion emitted large amounts of carbon dioxide and sulfur dioxide. Air pollution from coal burning caused hundreds of thousands of premature deaths each year, including more than 600,000 premature infants. Fortunately, the proportion of coal in the national total power generation has declined from 75% in 1989 to 63% in 2015. The number of automobiles in China surged. In 2009 it surpassed the United States to become the world's largest automobile manufacturer. This increased harmful haze in cities and also accelerated global warming. The fuel quality used in Chinese trucks was very poor, containing large amounts of pollutants. Deposits of these exhaust particulates could be seen everywhere in cities. In 2009, the People's Republic of China surpassed the United States to become the world's largest carbon dioxide emitter and a major contributor to global warming. In recent years the People's Republic of China has made progress in limiting greenhouse gas emissions. In 2014, China and the United States reached an agreement on greenhouse gas reduction. For environmental protection, China has also rapidly developed oil-gas hybrid vehicles and electric vehicles.

=== Global warming ===
Global climate warming has reduced the area of glaciers on the Tibetan Plateau. Scholars predict that by 2100, glaciers in China will decrease by more than 45%. Glacier melting brings more water to Xinjiang oasises, temporarily allowing grasslands and lakes to recover vitality. But at the same time, the number of rivers around Qinghai Lake is decreasing. Rising temperatures and changes in rainfall patterns are causing further desertification in Tibet. The continuous light rain that once nourished grasslands has turned into short, torrential downpours. Grasslands are beginning to dry out. Rising temperatures are causing permafrost to begin melting. Previously, melting snow and rainfall would remain on the soil surface to keep grasslands moist. Now it seeps deep into the soil, lowering grassland water levels. Slowly advancing deserts and sandstorms have begun sweeping across the Tibetan Plateau.

=== Biodiversity ===
Despite long-term environmental degradation, China remains one of the world's most biodiverse regions and is one of the 12 countries with the greatest biodiversity. It currently has 30,000 species of seed plants, of which 13,000 live in Yunnan—second only to the Amazon rainforest. China also has 6,300 species of vertebrate, accounting for 14% of the world total. However, the mainland's environment is becoming homogenized. Agriculture and farming systems have shaped a very uniform ecological environment. Economic growth has further accelerated the depletion of wild plant and animal populations. Nearly 400 species face extinction risks, mainly due to habitat fragmentation. Only small amounts of forest remain in remote southwestern and northeastern areas. Biodiversity is under severe threat. Nationally, about 40% of animals and 70%–86% of plant species are endangered. Asian elephants live only in the most remote parts of the southwest. The South China tiger is an endangered species. The baiji is likely already extinct. The waters around the Zhoushan Archipelago were once one of the most productive marine ecosystems in the East China Sea. The main commercial fish species were large yellow croaker, small yellow croaker, hairtail, and cuttlefish. In the 1970s, populations of all four species showed signs of severe decline. Marine pollution caused by industrial development in coastal areas further reduced fish numbers. In the 1990s, these fish accounted for only 20% of total production. By the end of the 20th century, the fisheries for small and large yellow croaker and cuttlefish had collapsed, while hairtail was on the verge of exhaustion. From 2021, a "ten-year fishing ban" was launched in key waters of the Yangtze basin to ensure reproduction of rare species in the river. The plan has been quite effective—for example, the Yangtze finless porpoise population has increased. In early 2024, monitoring detected 193 fish species, an increase of 25 species from 2020.

=== Environmental protection policy ===
China's first national environmental protection program, developed in the 1970s, focused on the idea of "complete utilization" as one of its key elements. Complete utilization was a waste-recycling and production efficiency principle that had developed in the 1950s as a response to material scarcity in the early PRC; its underlying philosophy was expressed in the slogan "turning waste into treasure and harm into benefit."

In 1979, the central government formulated the Environmental Protection Law (Trial). In 1989 it formulated the Environmental Protection Law, establishing systems for environmental impact assessment, pollution discharge fees, and time-limited improvement. In 1989 the central government also established the National Environmental Protection Agency (later upgraded to the State Environmental Protection Administration and the Ministry of Environmental Protection), mainly responsible for implementing environmental laws and regulations. The National People's Congress passed many environmental protection laws, but local governments often failed to implement these orders. Local governments placed more emphasis on creating revenue to increase taxes and thereby obtain rewards or promotions than on environmental protection. By the 1990s, people began to understand sustainable development, the resilience of nature, and the importance of working with natural forces. Environmental protection departments focused on exposing illegal polluting enterprises, but many banned enterprises resumed operations after a period. When polluting enterprises accounted for a large part of government tax revenue, local cadres often did not take strict measures against them. If the environmental protection bureau director took strict measures, his own position might be threatened, leading to incomplete handling of polluting enterprises.
