= MEP =

MEP may refer to:

== Organisations ==
- Hollings Manufacturing Extension Partnership, an NIST network of centers, US
- Maison européenne de la photographie, a photography centre in Paris
- Massachusetts Environmental Police, US
- Mission Essential (formerly Mission Essential Personnel), an American defense contractor
- Paris Foreign Missions Society (French: Missions étrangères de Paris), a Catholic organization

=== Politics ===
- Mahajana Eksath Peramuna, a political party in Sri Lanka
- Mahajana Eksath Peramuna (1956), a former political alliance in Sri Lanka
- Member of the European Parliament
- Model European Parliament, a simulation for students
- Ministry of Environmental Protection (disambiguation)
- Hope for Portugal Movement (Portuguese: Movimento Esperança Portugal), a political party
- People's Electoral Movement (Aruba) (Papiamento: Movimiento Electoral di Pueblo), a political party
- People's Electoral Movement (Venezuela) (Spanish: Movimiento Electoral del Pueblo), a political party

== Science and technology ==
=== Science ===
- Mars Exploration Program, NASA
- Maximal expiratory pressure, using a respiratory pressure meter
- Megakaryocyte–erythroid progenitor cell, blood cells
- Melanophlogite, a silicate mineral
- Motor evoked potentials, in the nervous system
- 2-C-Methylerythritol 4-phosphate, an intermediate on the MEP pathway

=== Technology and engineering ===
- Mean effective pressure, of internal combustion engines
- Mechanical, electrical, and plumbing, in building design
- Media-embedded processor (MeP), by Toshiba
- Message exchange pattern, in software architecture

== Transportation ==
- Meopham railway station (station code: MEP), in England
- Mersing Airport (IATA airport code: MEP), an airport in Malaysia
- Multi-engine piston, a pilot's rating class

== Other uses ==
- Miriwoong language (ISO 639 code: mep), an Australian language
- Mogens E. Pedersen (1928–2014), Danish Journalist nicknamed MEP
