= Environmental issues in China =

Air pollution caused by industrial plants (a factory at Yangtze River)

Environmental issues in China had risen in tandem with the country's rapid industrialisation, as well as lax environmental oversight especially during the early 2000s. China was ranked 120th out of the 180 countries on the 2020 Environmental Performance Index.

The Chinese government has acknowledged the problems and made various responses, resulting in some improvements, but western media has criticized the actions as inadequate. In recent years, there has been increased citizens' activism against government decisions that are perceived as environmentally damaging, and a retired government official claimed that the year of 2012 saw over 50,000 environmental protests in China.

Since the 2010s, the government has given greater attention to environmental protection through policy actions such as the signing of the Paris climate accord, the 13th Five-Year Plan and the 2015 Environmental Protection Law reform From 2006 to 2017, sulphur dioxide levels in China were reduced by 70 percent, and air pollution has decreased from 2013 to 2018 In 2017, investments in renewable energy amounted to US$279.8 billion worldwide, with China accounting for US$126.6 billion or 45% of the global investments. China has since become the world's largest investor, producer and consumer of renewable energy worldwide, manufacturing state-of-the-art solar panels, wind turbines and hydroelectric energy facilities as well as becoming the world's largest producer of electric cars and buses.

From an international perspective, China is a party to most of the major treaties meant to address environmental issues. This includes the Antarctic-Environmental Protocol, the Antarctic Treaty, the Convention on Biological Diversity, the Climate Change treaty, the United Nations Convention to Combat Desertification, the Endangered Species treaty, the Hazardous Wastes treaty, the Law of the Sea, the International Tropical Timber Agreements of 1983 and 1994, the International Convention for the Regulation of Whaling, and agreements on Marine Dumping, Ozone Layer Protection, Ship Pollution, and Wetlands protection. China has signed, but not ratified, the Kyoto Protocol (but is not yet required to reduce its carbon emission under the agreement, as is India) and the Nuclear Test Ban treaty.

== Environmental problems ==
=== Background ===
Before the 1949 founding of the People's Republic of China, the environment was degraded. Beginning in the 1500s, farmers cleared upland land to increase agricultural acreage to plant crops, contributing to hundreds of years of deforestation. Erosion from denuded hillsides contributed to chronic flooding and resulted in sediment clogging waterways. The intensive farming systems of China had caused progressive loss of soil nutrients in the nineteenth and twentieth centuries. Polders encroached on lakes and wetlands.

According to academic Robert Marks, environmental degradation in China had become an ecological crisis by the end of the eighteenth century.

Decades of warfare had also damaged the environment in the period prior to the founding of the PRC.

=== Water resources ===
The water resources of China are affected by both severe water quantity shortages and severe water quality pollution. An increasing population and rapid economic growth as well as lax environmental oversight have increased water demand and pollution. China has responded by measures such as rapidly building out the water infrastructure and increased regulation as well as exploring a number of further technological solutions. Water usage by its coal-fired power stations is drying-up Northern China.

According to Chinese government in 2014 59.6% of groundwater sites are poor or extremely poor quality.

A 2016 research study indicated that China's water contains dangerous amounts of the cancer-causing agent nitrosodimethylamine (NDMA). In China, NDMA is thought to be a byproduct of local water treatment processes (which involve heavy chlorination).

=== Afforestation and deforestation ===
Between 1700 and 1949, more forests were destroyed in China than in the previous 5,000 years.

Beginning in 1900, China's governments mobilized labor and resources to plant trees. The PRC was the first to make significant progress in afforestation. Prior to the founding of the PRC, the country's forest cover had been reduced to 5-8% and its per capita forest resources ranked 120th out of 160 countries.

As of 2005, China's forest cover was about 20%.

Two large reforestation programs, the Natural Forest Protection Program and the Returning Farmland to Forest program, were announced in late 1998. The programs were piloted in Sichuan, Shaanxi, and Gansu in 1999. They became widely implemented in 2000. The Natural Forest Protection Program called for major reductions in timber harvest, forest conservation, and instituted logging bans in most of Sichuan, Yunnan, Guizhou, and Tibet. The program provided for alternative employment opportunities for former logging industry workers, including hiring them for reforestation work. The Returning Farmland to Forest program paid farmers to plant trees on less productive farmland and provided them with a yearly subsidy for lost income.

In 2001, the United Nations Environment Programme (UNEP) listed China among the top 15 countries with the most "closed forest," i.e., virgin, old growth forest or naturally regrown woods. 12% of China's land area, or more than 111 million hectares, is closed forest. However, the UNEP also estimates that 36% of China's closed forests are facing pressure from high population densities, making preservation efforts especially important. In 2011, Conservation International listed the forests of south-west Sichuan as one of the world's ten most threatened forest regions.

China had a 2018 Forest Landscape Integrity Index mean score of 7.14/10, ranking it 53rd globally out of 172 countries. By 2023, the Chinese government was encouraging deforestation in an attempt to gain food independence.

==== Tree cover extent and loss ====
Global Forest Watch publishes annual estimates of tree cover loss and 2000 tree cover extent derived from time-series analysis of Landsat satellite imagery in the Global Forest Change dataset. In this framework, tree cover refers to vegetation taller than 5 m (including natural forests and tree plantations), and tree cover loss is defined as the complete removal of tree cover canopy for a given year, regardless of cause.

For China, country statistics report cumulative tree cover loss of 12,766,739 ha (127,667.39 km^{2}) from 2001 to 2024 (about 7.8% of its 2000 tree cover area). For tree cover density greater than 30%, country statistics report a 2000 tree cover extent of 162,873,593 ha (1,628,735.93 km^{2}). The charts and table below display this data. In simple terms, the annual loss number is the area where tree cover disappeared in that year, and the extent number shows what remains of the 2000 tree cover baseline after subtracting cumulative loss. Forest regrowth is not included in the dataset.

Annual tree cover loss in China, 2001–2024. View chart definition.
Tree cover extent in 2000 minus cumulative tree cover loss in China, 2001–2024 (loss-only residual; does not account for gain). View chart definition.

Annual tree cover extent and loss
Year	Tree cover extent (km2) (Note: This residual measure does not include forest regrowth.)	Annual tree cover loss (km2)
2001	1,626,432.85	2,303.08
2002	1,623,941.00	2,491.85
2003	1,621,323.24	2,617.76
2004	1,616,307.43	5,015.81
2005	1,612,471.35	3,836.08
2006	1,606,718.53	5,752.82
2007	1,600,188.02	6,530.51
2008	1,592,807.11	7,380.91
2009	1,586,810.00	5,997.11
2010	1,580,531.45	6,278.55
2011	1,574,545.26	5,986.19
2012	1,568,494.92	6,050.34
2013	1,564,081.55	4,413.37
2014	1,558,764.53	5,317.02
2015	1,553,859.59	4,904.94
2016	1,546,671.85	7,187.74
2017	1,540,227.53	6,444.32
2018	1,534,529.85	5,697.68
2019	1,529,559.58	4,970.27
2020	1,525,335.96	4,223.62
2021	1,519,968.23	5,367.73
2022	1,513,848.14	6,120.09
2023	1,507,820.51	6,027.63
2024	1,501,068.54	6,751.97

=== Three Gorges dam ===
The Three Gorges Dam produces 3% of the electricity in China but has displaced houses and caused environmental problems within the local environment. Due to the construction of the dam over one million people have been displaced from their homes. The dam has also caused frequent major landslides due to the erosion in the reservoir. These major landslides included two incidents in May 2009 when somewhere between 20,000 and 50,000 cubic metres (26,000 and 65,000 cu yd) of material plunged into the flooded Wuxia Gorge of the Wu River.

=== Coastal reclamation ===
China's marine environment, including the Yellow Sea and South China Sea, are considered among the most degraded marine areas on earth. Loss of natural coastal habitats due to land reclamation has resulted in the destruction of more than 65% of tidal wetlands around China's Yellow Sea coastline in approximately 50 years. Rapid coastal development for agriculture, aquaculture and industrial development are considered the primary drivers of coastal destruction in the region.

In the South China Sea, coral reefs have been severely destroyed by land reclamation by several countries, with China being one of the top contributors. Of the 7,165 acres of destroyed reefs, China is responsible for 65% of the destruction, having destroyed about 4,648 acres since 2013. The "Great Wall of Sand" was one of the main contributors to the destruction of the reefs. As surrounding countries continue to battle for control over the South China Sea, land reclamation poses as a threat to surrounding environments.

=== Desertification ===
Desertification remains a serious problem, consuming an area greater than the area used as farmland. Although desertification has been curbed in some areas, it is still expanding at a rate of more than 67 km^{2} every year. 90% of China's desertification occurs in the west of the country. Approximately 30% of China's surface area is desert. China's rapid industrialization could cause this area to drastically increase. The Gobi Desert in the north currently expands by about 950 square miles (2,500 km^{2}) per year. The vast plains in northern China used to be regularly flooded by the Yellow River. However, overgrazing and the expansion of agricultural land could cause this area to increase. In 2009, it was estimated that over 200 high-altitude lakes in Zoigê Marsh, which provides 30% of the Yellow River's water, had dried up. In Inner Mongolia, to mitigate the financial impact on families from desertification, women are taught traditional embroidery techniques which they then use to create additional income. The scheme was started by local embroiderer Bai Jingying.

=== Climate change ===
Climate change had already impacted China. It increased mortality from extreme weather events, infectious disease, poor air and water quality. The effects of air pollutions are exacerbated by the rise in temperatures. In the future climate change may lead to "typhoons, floods, blizzards, windstorms, drought, and landslides" and to more severe damage from infectious diseases In the years 1970-2016 the occurrence of crop pest and diseases increased 4 times. 22% of that rise are due to climate change. By the year 2100 the occurrence will rise 243% under a low emission scenario and by 460% under a high emissions scenario. China is the biggest producer of wheat and rice in the world. It is in the second place in maize production.

According to one report, China is the country with the largest number of people who can be impacted by sea level rise.

One of the main problems is the melting of glaciers and permafrost in Tibet. These glaciers and permafrost supply water to approximately 2 billion people. The temperatures in the region rise 4 times faster than anywhere in Asia. According to Xinhua News Agency 18% of glaciers already melted from the middle of the 20th century. The water level in big rivers is lowering. This has an impact on the water supply of China because many rivers, including the Yangtze and Yellow River are getting water from the Tibet glaciers. According to China's Ministry of Water Resources 28,000 of rivers disappeared in China by the year 2013 and the melting of Tibet glaciers and permafrost can be one of the causes. The melting also has an impact on the water supply of others countries in eastern Asia, including India, Pakistan, Bangladesh and more, that can lead to conflicts over water. According to Chinese Academy of Science "more than 80 percent of Tibetan Plateau permafrost could be gone by the year 2100, and that almost 40 percent of it would be gone within the "near future." Some researchers predict that most of the Himalayan glaciers will disappear in 20 years.

=== Pollution ===
Various forms of pollution have increased as China has further industrialized, which has caused widespread environmental and health problems. China has responded with increasing environmental regulations and a build-up of pollutant treatment infrastructure which have caused improvements on some variables. As of 2013 Beijing, which lies in a topographic bowl, has significant industry, and heats with coal, is subject to air inversions resulting in extremely high levels of pollution in winter months. In response to an increasingly problematic air pollution problem, the Chinese government announced a five-year, US$277 billion plan to address the issue. Northern China will receive particular attention, as the government aims to reduce air emissions by 25 percent by 2017, compared with 2012 levels, in those areas where pollution is especially serious. According to a report published by Greenpeace and Peking University's School of Public Health in December 2012, the coal industry is responsible for the highest levels of air pollution (19 percent), followed by vehicle emissions (6 percent). Ambient air pollution is measured by the amount of particulate matter in the air. This is a result of burning fossil fuels. "Because coal is the primary fuel used to power China's industrial sector, it is responsible for about 40 percent of the deadly fine particulate matter found in China's atmosphere." In January 2013, fine airborne particulates that pose the largest health risks, rose as high as 993 micrograms per cubic meter in Beijing, compared with World Health Organization guidelines of no more than 25. The World Bank estimates that 16 of the world's most-polluted cities are located in China.

Coastal pollution is widespread, leading to declines in habitat quality and increasing harmful algal blooms. The largest algal bloom recorded in history occurred in China around the southern Yellow Sea in 2008, and was easily observed from space.

Rising affluence is another indirect cause of pollution. In particular, car ownership has skyrocketed. In 2014, China added a record 17 million new cars to the road and car ownership reached 154 million.

China is the biggest producer of single use plastic which causes severe pollution. The biggest landfill of the country was filled 25 years before it was planned.

==== Land pollution ====
In July 2015, Council on Foreign Relations Director of Asia Studies Elizabeth Economy writing in The Diplomat listed soil contamination as a "poor stepchild" of the Chinese environmental movement, and questioned whether or not recent measures from the Ministry of Environmental Protection would be adequate in combating the problem. In her 2004 book The River Runs Black, she wrote, "China's spectacular economic growth over the past two decades has dramatically depleted the country's natural resources and produced skyrocketing rates of pollution. Environmental degradation has also contributed to significant public health problems, mass migration, economic loss, and social unrest."

=== Population ===
China currently has the 2nd largest population in the world but population growth is very slow in part due to the one-child policy. The environmental issues are also negatively affecting the people living in China. Because of the emissions created from the factories, the number of people diagnosed with cancer in China has increased. Lung cancer is the most common form of cancer that is plaguing the population. In 2015, there were more than 4.3 million new cancer cases in the country and more than 2.8 million people died from the disease.

=== Animal welfare ===
The People's Republic of China has limited animal protections by international standards, and animal-rights activists have condemned the treatment of animals in the country. Protests and movement towards animal welfare and animal rights have expanded in China, but face resistance from the Chinese government.

=== Natural disasters ===
According to Jared Diamond, the six main categories of environmental problems of China are: air pollution, water problems, soil problems, habitat destruction, biodiversity loss and mega projects. He also explained that "China is noted for the frequency, number, extent, and damage of its natural disasters". Some natural disasters in China are "closely related to human environmental impacts", especially: dust storms, landslides, droughts and floods.

=== Environmental Injustice ===
China's rural population faces environmental challenges disproportionately as less developed, rural provinces often deal with larger polluting entities and looser environmental regulations. The environmental regulations in rural areas are less strict than the densely populated, urban areas allowing enterprises in industries that contribute greatly to pollution like energy producers move away from cities and continue polluting at levels that would be not be allowed had they remained there. These groups also lobby policy makers in the area to ensure regulations do not change and become stricter.

China's urban population has also been found to face greater environmental issues if they live in lower-priced housing. In a 2023 experiment the urban tree canopy (UTC) cover of Chinese cities was found to relate to nearby housing prices where the lower value the housing, the lower amount of UTC cover available. UTC cover is an important marker for sustainable development, providing many ecological benefits as well as improving the quality of life of residents. The distributions of these benefits is unequal, the areas with the highest housing prices have the most UTC cover, meaning residents are likely to have better mental health and live in an area with a greater degree of sustainable development. Those living in the lower priced housing receive much less benefit and likely live in areas with greater environmental issues.

== Response ==
=== General overview of the environmental policy ===
China's first national environmental protection program, developed in the 1970s, focused on the idea of "complete utilization" as one of its key elements. Complete utilization was a waste-recycling and production efficiency principle that had developed in the 1950s as a response to material scarcity in the early PRC; its underlying philosophy was expressed in the slogan "turning waste into treasure and harm into benefit."

In 2012 the Center for American Progress has described China's environmental policy as similar to that of the United States before 1970. That is, the central government issues fairly strict regulations, but the actual monitoring and enforcement is largely undertaken by local governments that are more interested in economic growth. Furthermore, due to the restrictive conduct of China's undemocratic regime, the environmental work of non-governmental forces, such as lawyers, journalists, and non-governmental organizations, is severely hampered.

Since 2002, the number of complaints to the environmental authorities increased by 30 percent every year, reaching 600,000 in 2004; meanwhile, according to an article by the director of the Institute of Public and Environmental Affairs Ma Jun in 2007, the number of mass protests caused by environmental issues grew by 29 percent every year since that time. The growing attention upon environmental matters caused the Chinese government to display an increased level of concern towards environmental issues and the creation of sustainable growth. For example, in his annual address in 2007, Wen Jiabao, the Premier of China, made 48 references to "environment," "pollution," and "environmental protection", and stricter environmental regulations were subsequently implemented. Some of the subsidies for polluting industries were cancelled, while some polluting industries were shut down. However, although the promotion of clean energy technology occurred, many environmental targets were missed.

After the 2007 address, polluting industries continued to receive inexpensive access to land, water, electricity, oil, and bank loans, while market-oriented measures, such as surcharges on fuel and coal, were not considered by the government despite their proven success in other countries. The significant influence of corruption was also a hindrance to effective enforcement, as local authorities ignored orders and hampered the effectiveness of central decisions. In response to a challenging environmental situation, General Secretary of the Chinese Communist Party Hu Jintao implemented the "Green G.D.P." project, whereby China's gross domestic product was adjusted to compensate for negative environmental effects; however, the program lost official influence in spring 2007 due to the confronting nature of the data. The project's lead researcher claimed that provincial leaders terminated the program, stating "Officials do not like to be lined up and told how they are not meeting the leadership's goals ... They found it difficult to accept this."

China included the target of achieving Ecological civilization in its constitution, but there are some concerns about implementation.

In March 2014, CCP General Secretary Xi Jinping "declared war" on pollution during the opening of the National People's Congress. After extensive debate lasting nearly two years, the parliament approved a new environmental law in April. The new law empowers environmental enforcement agencies with great punitive power, defines areas which require extra protection, and gives independent environmental groups more ability to operate in the country. The new articles of the law specifically address air pollution, and call for additional government oversight. Lawmaker Xin Chunying called the law "a heavy blow [in the fight against] our country's harsh environmental realities, and an important systemic construct". Three previous versions of the bill were voted down. The bill is the first revision to the environmental protection law since 1989.

In 2019, it launched the Belt and Road Initiative International Green Development Coalition.

In 2020, Chinese Communist Party general secretary Xi Jinping announced that China aims to peak emissions before 2030 and go carbon-neutral by 2060 in accordance with the Paris climate accord. According to Climate Action Tracker, if accomplished it would lower the expected rise in global temperature by 0.2 - 0.3 degrees - "the biggest single reduction ever estimated by the Climate Action Tracker".

In September 2021 Xi Jinping announced that China will not build "coal-fired power projects abroad". The decision can be "pivotal" in reducing emissions. The Belt and Road Initiative did not include financing such projects already in the first half of 2021.

During COP26 the United States and China agreed on a framework to reduce GHG emission by co-operating on different measures, including lowering the use of methane, phasing down the use of coal and increasing protection of forests.

=== Protecting and restoring ecosystems ===
==== Reforestation ====
According to the Chinese Academy of Forestry, between 1999 and 2002, China converted 7.7 million hectares of farmland into forest.

33.8 million hectares (338,000 km^{2}) of forest had been planted in China in the years 2013 - 2018. The Chinese government pledged to increase the forest cover of the country from 21.7% to 23% in the years 2016 - 2020 and to 26% by the year 2035 According to the government's plan, by 2050, 30% of China's territory should be covered by forests. According to the government's Xinhua News Agency one third of the population of China participated in tree planting in the first half on 2020. 1.69 billion trees were planted, increasing the forest cover by 4.43 million hectares.

In December 2020 China proposed a new Nationally Determined Contribution (but still not submitted it). According to it China will increase its forest stock volume by 6 billion cubic metres by 2030 (instead of 4.5 billion cubic metres before).

Ou Hongyi the single climate striker of China created an initiative named "Plant for survival". In 2 – 3 months, more than 300 trees were planted.

According to South China Morning Post reforestation in China increased the world tree canopy cover by 25%. The trees were first planted for stopping soil erosion and flooding but now can act as a tool to fight climate change.

In the years 2012-2022 China restored more than 70 million hectares (700,000 km^{2}) of forests. China committed to plant and conserve 70 billion trees by the year 2030 as part of the Trillion Tree Campaign.

Conserving and planting mangroves is an important part of the environmental policy of China. Mangroves store more carbon per acre than rainforests. 1 square kilometre of mangrove forests store the same amount of carbon that is emitted by 35,000 cars for an entire year. They also protect the population from storms and flooding in general and serve as important natural habitat for wildlife. Mangroves face considerable threats in China due to large scale development. China decided to increase its mangrove forests cover by 18,000 hectares by the year 2025 and created 52 protected areas covering 55% of its overall mangrove forest territory.

==== Stopping erosion and desertification ====
In 1994, China started the Loess Plateau Watershed Rehabilitation Project.

In 2001, China initiated a "Green Wall of China" project. It is a project to create a 2,800-mile (4,500 km) "green belt" to hold back the encroaching desert. The first phase of the project, to restore 9 million acres (36,000 km^{2}) of forest, will be completed by 2010 at an estimated cost of $8 billion. The Chinese government believes that, by 2050, it can restore most desert land back to forest. The project is possibly the largest ecological project in history. It has also been criticized on various grounds such as other methods being more effective.

==== Protecting rivers ====
In 2020, a sweeping law was passed by the Chinese government to protect the ecology of the Yangtze River. The new laws include strengthening ecological protection rules for hydropower projects along the river, banning chemical plants within 1 kilometer of the river, relocating polluting industries, severely restricting sand mining as well as a complete fishing ban on all the natural waterways of the river, including all its major tributaries and lakes.

=== Climate change mitigation ===
Since 2000, rising CO_{2} emissions in China and the rest of world have eclipsed the output of the United States and Europe.

Per person, the United States generates carbon dioxide at a far faster rate than other primary regions.

The position of the Chinese government on climate change is contentious. China is the world's current largest emitter of carbon dioxide although not the cumulative largest. China has ratified the Kyoto Protocol, but as a non-Annex I country was not required to limit greenhouse gas emissions under terms of the agreement.

In September 2020, General Secretary of the Chinese Communist Party Xi Jinping announced that China will "strengthen its 2030 climate target (NDC), peak emissions before 2030 and aim to achieve carbon neutrality before 2060". According to Climate Action Tracker if it will be accomplished it will lower the expected rise in global temperature by 0.2 - 0.3 degrees - "the biggest single reduction ever estimated by the Climate Action Tracker". The announcement was made in the United Nations General Assembly. Xi Jinping mentioned the link between the corona pandemic and nature destruction as one of the reasons for the decision, saying that "Humankind can no longer afford to ignore the repeated warnings of nature."

On the 27 September 2020, China's climate scientists presented a detailed plan how to achieve the target, described as "The most ambitious climate goal the world's ever seen". According to the plan GHG emission will begin to decline between 2025 and 2030, while total energy consumption will do so in 2035. By 2050 China will stop producing electricity with coal. By 2025, 20% of energy will be produced without fossil fuels. According to the plan GHG emissions will reach 10.2 billion tons between 2025 and 2030, decline to 9 billion by 2035, 3 billion by 2050 and 200 million by 2060. The emissions that will rest by 2060 will be mitigated with Carbon capture and storage, Carbon sequestration, Bioenergy.

In the 2021 Leaders' Climate Summit China pledged to strictly limit the growth in coal consumption by 2025 and reduce the use of coal from 2026.

In September 2021 Xi Jinping announced that China will not build "coal-fired power projects abroad". No details were added.

Global carbon dioxide emissions by country in 2023:
1. China (31.8%)
2. United States (14.4%)
3. European Union (4.90%)
4. India (9.50%)
5. Russia (5.80%)
6. Japan (3.50%)
7. Other (30.1%)

During COP26 the United States and China agreed on a framework to reduce GHG emission by co-operating on different measures. The framework includes commitments to:

- Working for achieving halt in temperature rise on 2 and preferably 1.5 degrees, global Carbon neutrality.
- Establishing environmental standards and policies needed for the transition to clean economy.
- Moving toward Circular economy.
- Control and reduce Methane emissions. China will adopt a national methane reduction plan as the USA has already done. In the first half of 2022 both countries will convene a meeting to accelerate the process.
- Increase Energy efficiency and usage of Renewable energy. The USA will make its electricity sector, carbon pollution-free by the year 2035.
- Working to stop globally the use of unabated thermal coal power generation. China will lower the use of coal how much it can during the 15th Five Year Plan.
- Working to stop illegal deforestation by stopping illegal imports.
- Giving financial and capacity building help to other countries.
- Submitting new NDC to the year 2035 by the year 2025.
- Create a special body: ""Working Group on Enhancing Climate Action in the 2020s," that will coordinate the implementation of this agreement.

In January 2022 the government of China called for a transition to "green consumption" and issued some guidelines how to do it. This includes different types of products, but especially transportation. It directed local authorities to encourage "consumers to buy light, small and low-emission vehicles".

=== Energy efficiency ===
According to a 2007 article, during the 1980 to 2000 period the energy efficiency improved greatly. However, in 1997, due to fears of a recession, tax incentives and state financing were introduced for rapid industrialization. This may have contributed to the rapid development of very energy inefficient heavy industry. Chinese steel factories used one-fifth more energy per ton than the international average. Cement needed 45 percent more power, and ethylene needed 70 percent more than the average. Chinese buildings rarely had thermal insulation and used twice as much energy to heat and cool as those in the Europe and the United States in similar climates. 95% of new buildings did not meet China's own energy efficiency regulations.

A 2011 report by a project facilitated by World Resources Institute stated that the 11th five-year plan (2005 to 2010), in response to worsening energy intensity in the 2002-2005 period, set a goal of a 20% improvement of energy intensity. The report stated that this goal likely was achieved or nearly achieved. The next five-year plan set a goal of improving energy intensity by 16%. In 2022 China published a plan of energy conservation for the 14th five-year plan (2021 to 2025) with a target of cutting energy consumption per unit of GDP by 13.5% by the year 2025 in comparison to the level of 2020. The plan regards 17 different sectors in the economy. In some sectors 20% - 40% of the capacities are not meeting the standards they need to meet by 2025. This policy expects to benefit the biggest companies who have the possibility to reach the targets.

=== Adaptation to climate change ===
Sponge cities in China are a way of adaptation to flooding exacerbated by climate change and urbanization. China has been noted for its effort in adopting the Sponge City initiative. In 2015, China was reported to have initiated a pilot initiative in 16 districts.

=== Animal welfare ===
There are currently no nationwide animal welfare laws in China. However, the World Animal Protection notes that some legislation protecting the welfare of animals exists in certain contexts, especially ones used in research and in zoos.

In 2006, Zhou Ping of the National People's Congress introduced the first nationwide animal-protection law in China, but it didn't move forward. In September 2009, the first comprehensive Animal protection law of the People's Republic of China was introduced, but it hasn't made any progress.

In 2016, the Chinese government adopted a plan to reduce China's meat consumption by 50%, for achieving more sustainable and healthy food system.

=== Reducing plastic pollution ===
In 2017 China banned the import of most types of plastic. In 2019 it announced a ban on single use plastic, but it should enter into force gradually, through 6 years. China's government is trying to replace it with biodegradable plastic, but it can work only in certain conditions. Refillable containers can solve the problem better.

In September 2020, the Ministry of Commerce announced a ban on single-use plastic bags and single-use cutlery in big cities by the end of the year, as well as a nationwide ban on single-use plastic straws.

=== Community activism ===
As a result of more incidents relating to natural disasters and negative health consequences tied to environmental issues, sociologists Deng Yanhua and Yang Guobin write that more people in China are "becoming increasingly environmentally concerned and may organize protests against anticipated pollution." According to Ronggui Huang and Xiaoyi Sun, "many environmental protests are tolerated by the Chinese authority, because protests are seen by the central government as an information-gathering channel to identify the dangerously discontented social groups and to monitor local officials." This increase in environmental action in the late 20th century has accomplished the growth of awareness which led to the rise of environmental non-governmental organizations (ENGOs). ENGOs have engaged in campaigns that have seen some success. The world and scholars all over have been interested in ENGOs given their existence in an authoritarian state and position that some expect will "counterbalance environment-unfriendly economic forces". Some of these scholars argue that ENGOs have become more legitimate given new environmental laws that aim to curb negative environmental practices in China.

Alongside the rise of ENGOs, the Ministry of Ecology and Environment (formerly known as the State Environmental Protection Administration or SEPA) began to rise in power since its creation in the 1970s. Bureaucratic constraints forced the Ministry to partner with organizations outside of the government to be more successful. The ENGOs with their vast networks and methods appeared to be a good choice in partner for the ministry.

Opposition to the Nujiang dam project was one campaign in which shows the partnership between the ENGOs and SEPA. The project introduced in 2003 intended to build reservoirs and dams along the Nujiang River. The movement against the project, which halted construction in 2016 was "a peak in the history of China's environmental movement." According to sociologists Yanfei Sun and Dingxin Zhao reasons for this was the higher risk involved following the environmental action and government response to the Three Gorges Dam. According to the South China Morning Post cooperation from different activist groups developed during the opposition to the project. Previously these groups "tended to work alone due to the strong personalities of their leaders." Wang Yongchen, founder of the ENGO Green Earth Volunteers has been a strong voice in this campaign against the dam project.

Organizers employ a variety of methods that have developed in response to potential issues that environmental action faces. Some of these issues include environmental science not being widely accessible and understood by the general population, bureaucratic constraints in legal channels, fear of government suppression, the difficulty in proving the health-related consequences of pollution, economic blackmail, and the antagonistic relationships between local governments and ENGOs.

Success in environmental action would also appear to depend on the organizers themselves and how effective they can be overall. Several scholars argue that framing environmental issues properly has been a successful method "used by environmental activists to mobilize citizens behind the protests". Deng Yanhua and Yang Guobin write that piggybacking onto other political issues is another successful method. For example, instead of following through with environmental claims, there has been success in piggybacking onto the issue of land claims in order "to maximize the vulnerability of their opponents." In order to work, the issue in question must be framed not as an environmental issue, but a land-related one. This happened during the 2005 Huashui protest targeting factory pollution that took place in Zhejiang Province where organizers framed the issue as illegal land acquisition.

The protests that began on June 28, 2019 in Wuhan against a proposed incinerator typify the anti-incinerator movement in China. People took to the streets to force the local government to move the location of the proposed incinerator. The protests were met with violence from the police. Other examples of environmental action include the China PX protest and the Qidong Protest of 2012. Residents of Qidong were successful in protesting a pipeline from the Japanese Oji Paper Company. The organizers framed "their collective actions in opposition to Oji Paper and even the Japanese." This played on the anti-Japanese sentiment in China. It also deflected blame away from the government. Shifting blame away from the government, "reduced the chance of activists' protest being repressed." Being aware of possible repression is important when engaging in any kind of action in China.

=== International action ===
A study published by the Grantham Research Institute on Climate Change and the Environment in London found "enormous opportunities for China to become a stronger leader in climate action and diplomacy" if it will lead the transition to sustainability.

On 1 April 2021 leaders from China and European Union met in a summit. Among other issues they decided to continue cooperation on climate issues, and creating strong policy for protecting biodiversity.

== See also ==
- Anti-incinerator movement in China
- Chinadialogue
- Dongtan, Chinese ecocity
- Elizabeth Economy (China environment expert)
- Environment of China
- Environmental history of China
- Environmentalism in China
- Environmental issues with the Three Gorges Dam
- Hydrogen economy
- Leapfrogging from natural gas to hydrogen
- Tan Kai
- Wu Lihong
