= Environmental policy of China =

Environmental policy of the People's Republic of China is set by the National People's Congress and managed by the Ministry of Ecology and Environment of the People's Republic of China. Under the ministry, the Department of Policies, Laws, and Regulations is in charge of establishing and strengthening basic laws and policies such as environmental laws, administrative policies and economic regulations. It is also responsible for the development of national environmental protection policy and macro strategy.

China's rapid economic expansion combined with the country's relaxed environmental oversight has caused a number of ecological problems. In response to public pressure, the Chinese government has undertaken a number of measures to curb pollution in China and improve the country's environmental situation. In and before the 2010s, the government's response was criticized as inadequate; encouraged by national policy that judged regions primarily by their economic development, corrupt and unwilling local authorities hampered enforcement. In April 2014, the government amended its environmental law to better fight pollution.

Since the 2010s, the government has given greater attention to environmental protection through policy actions such as the signing of the Paris climate accord, the 13th Five-Year Plan and the 2015 Environmental Protection Law reform. From 2006 to 2017, sulphur dioxide levels in China were reduced by 70 percent, and air pollution has decreased from 2013 to 2018. In 2017, investments in renewable energy amounted to US$279.8 billion worldwide, with China accounting for US$126.6 billion or 45% of the global investments. China has become the world's largest investor, producer and consumer of renewable energy worldwide, manufacturing state-of-the-art solar panels, wind turbines, and hydroelectric energy facilities as well as becoming the world's largest producer of electric cars and buses. Its commitment to reducing its greenhouse gas emissions has been a major force in decreasing the global cost of wind and solar power, in turn helping the use of renewable energy to rise globally.

== Policy jurisdiction ==
China's State Environmental Protection Agency was raised to ministry level in 2008, and renamed the Ministry of Environmental Protection (MEP). Until 2018, it was responsible for implementing environmental policies, as well as the enforcement of environmental laws and regulations. The Ministry was tasked with protecting China's air, water, and land from pollution and contamination. Complementing its regulatory role, it funded and organized research and development.

Until 2018, China's pollutant trading programs and carbon emissions trading programs were under different policy jurisdictions. Pollutant trading programs were administered under the MEP and local Environmental Protection Bureaus until 2018. China's carbon emissions trading pilot programs were under the National Development and Reform Commission (NDRC) as well as local Development and Reform Councils.

In 2018, the Ministry of Ecology and Environment (MEE) was established. A number of environmental policy functions were merged from other ministries into the MEE, including MEP functions, climate policy previously under the NDRC, and a number of environmental policy functions previously under the Ministry of Water Resources and the State Oceanic Administration. Pollutant and carbon emissions trading programs were also placed within the MEE's jurisdiction. The NDRC continues to have a role in the promotion of sustainable development goals.

As of 2020, China's pollution reduction targets have been set geographically. Based on goals set in China's operative Five-Year Plan, the central government sets yearly pollution reduction targets. These targets are then divided among provinces, which divide them further among cities and counties. Local government's primary environmental policy goals are to meet these reduction targets.

In China, draft laws are submitted to the public for consultation and comments. Environmental non-government organizations in China are active in the legislative process through this mechanism.

As of at least 2023, there is a trend towards increasing emphasis on environmental policy success in the evaluation of Communist Party cadre.

== History ==
China's first national environmental protection program, developed in the 1970s, focused on the idea of "complete utilization" as one of its key elements. Complete utilization was a waste-recycling and production efficiency principle that had developed in the 1950s as a response to material scarcity in the early PRC; its underlying philosophy was expressed in the slogan "turning waste into treasure and harm into benefit." Complete utilization was ideologically framed as a unique approach that only a socialist economy could develop. According to Zhou Enlai, "There is nothing that cannot be used. But capitalists are afraid of investing more and making less profit. We socialists must emphasize comprehensive utilization and waste utilization."

From 1949 to 1979, China's participation in international environmental policy bodies was slight. In 1972, Chinese representatives attended the first United Nations Conference on the Human Environment. The next year, the Environmental Protection Leadership Group was established. In 1983, the Chinese government announced that environmental protection would become a state policy. China began taking an active role in international environmental policy since the 1992 Rio Meeting on Environment and Development. It has been active in international environmental fora since.

Through the 1980s and early 1990s, China did not prioritize domestic environmental matters. In 1987, it enacted its first air pollution control law. State policy began changing further in the mid-1990s to become more protective of the environment, with the pace of change accelerating following the 1998 China floods. After investigating, government scientists attributed much of the cause for flooding to upstream deforestation that had occurred during logging booms in the previous two decades. State regulation of environmental issues became more active, with the State Environmental Projection Administration aggressively campaigning against deforestation, curbing excessive water use during irrigation, and emphasizing decarbonization of China's energy supplies.

Beginning in 1998, the Chinese Communist Party (CCP) began to shift from a focus on pure developmentalism towards eco-developmentalism. Responding both to scientific evidence on the environment and increasing public pressure, the CCP began to re-formulate its ideology to recognize that the developmentalist approach during reform and opening up was not sustainable. The CCP began to use the terminology of environmental culture (huanjing wenhua) and ecological civilization.

Two large reforestation programs, the Natural Forest Protection Program and the Returning Farmland to Forest program, were announced in late 1998. The programs were piloted in Sichuan, Shaanxi, and Gansu in 1999. They became widely implemented in 2000. The Natural Forest Protection Program called for major reductions in timber harvest, forest conservation, and instituted logging bans in most of Sichuan, Yunnan, Guizhou, and Tibet. The program provided for alternative employment opportunities for former logging industry workers, including hiring them for reforestation work. The Returning Farmland to Forest program paid farmers to plant trees on less productive farmland and provided them with a yearly subsidy for lost income.

According to the Chinese government website, the Central Government invested more than 40 billion yuan between 1998 and 2001 on protection of vegetation, farm subsidies, and conversion of farm to forests. Between 1999 and 2002, China converted 7.7 million hectares of farmland into forest.

China became one of the 17 founding members of the Like-Minded Megadiverse Countries in 2002. The group was established to promote consultation and cooperation on the preservation and sustainable use of biodiversity.

China implemented its first renewable energy law over 2005-2006, expanding the market for renewable technology.

From 2001 to 2005, Chinese environmental authorities received more than 2.53 million letters and 430,000 visits by 597,000 petitioners seeking environmental redress. Meanwhile, the number of mass protests caused by concerns over environmental issues grew steadily from 2001 to 2007. The increased attention on environmental matters caused the Chinese government to display an increased level of concern towards environmental issues. For example, in his 2007 annual address Wen Jiabao, the Premier of China, made 48 references to "environment," "pollution," and "environmental protection", and stricter environmental regulations were subsequently implemented. Subsidies for some polluting industries were cancelled, while other polluting industries were shut down. However, many internal environmental targets were missed.

After the 2007 address, the influence of corruption was a hindrance to effective enforcement, as local authorities ignored orders and hampered the effectiveness of central decisions. In response, CCP general secretary Hu Jintao implemented the "Green G.D.P." project, where China's gross domestic product was adjusted to compensate for negative environmental effects; however, the program quickly lost official influence due to unfavorable data. The project's lead researcher claimed that provincial leaders "do not like to be lined up and told how they are not meeting the leadership's goals ... They found it difficult to accept this." The government attempted to hold national No Car Days where cars were banned from central roads, but the action was largely ignored.

In 2007, the central government initiated the National Specially Monitored Firms program, through which it directly monitored 3,115 water-polluting firms, 658 sewage treatment plants, and 3,592 air-polluting firms.

Domestic and international pressure prompted policy responses to reduce China's carbon emissions in advance of the 2008 Beijing Olympics. Policy measures enacted by China's central government included closing more than 1,100 factories in the metropolitan area, banning trucks in Beijing, and restricting passenger vehicle usage to alternate days.

In 2008, the State Environmental Protection Administration was official replaced by the Ministry of Environmental Protection during the March National People's Congress sessions in Beijing.

In 2011, the State Council issued its "Decision on Accelerating the Regulation of Water Consumption." The document's introduction emphasizes the importance of water management given the growing impact of climate change. The Decision established a 670 billion cubic meters limit for annual water consumption, to be broken down in turn per industry, region, and products.

Also in 2011, China addressed sulfur dioxide pollution through the China IV gasoline standard, which limited sulfur in gasoline to 50 ppm.

Citizen activism regarding government decisions that were perceived as environmentally damaging increased in the 2010s. In April 2012, protests occurred in the southern town of Yinggehai following the announcement of a power plant project. The protesters initially succeeded in halting the project, worth 3.9 billion renminbi (£387m). Another town was selected for the location of the plant, but when the residents in the second location also resisted the authorities returned to Yinggehai. A second round of protests occurred in October 2012 and police clashed with protester, leading to 50 arrests and almost 100 injuries. In response to a waste pipeline for a paper factory in the city of Qidong, several thousand demonstrators protested in July 2012. Sixteen of the protesters were sentenced to between twelve and eighteen months in prison; however, thirteen were granted a reprieve on the grounds that they had confessed and repented. In total, more than 50,000 environmental protests occurred in China during 2012.

In response to an increasing air pollution problem, the Chinese government announced a five-year, US$277 billion plan to address the issue in 2013. Northern China will receive particular attention, as the government aimed to reduce air emissions by 25 percent by 2017, compared with 2012 levels.

In 2012, the 18th CCP National Congress made ecological civilization one of the country's five national development goals. It emphasized a rural development approach of "Ecology, Productivity, Livability." The ecological civilization concept was also added to the Communist Party's constitution. CCP general secretary Xi Jinping has identified environmental protection as a top five priority for national progress and has popularized the slogan clear waters and green mountains to emphasize that economic development policies must also address environmental protection.

2013–2014 was the low point for China's urban environment. This prompted numerous policy initiatives under the framing of ecological civilization, including mitigation for air pollution, water pollution, urban flooding, urban heat islands, and subsidence, among other policy measures. The 2013 State Council Air Pollution Control Action Plan required the phase-in of the China V gasoline standard. A significantly more stringent standard than the China IV standard, the China V standard allowed no more than 10 ppm of sulfur in fuel. The 2014 National New-Type Urbanization Plan requires 20% of municipal regions to be zoned as ecological protection areas.

In March 2014, Premier Li Keqiang "declared war" on pollution during the opening of the National People's Congress. The NPC amended the Environmental Protection Law, strengthening the MEP's enforcement powers, and emphasizing the government's responsibility for protecting the environment. The amended law allows for public interest litigation on environmental issues and permits non-governmental organizations to bring such lawsuits. Lawmaker Xin Chunying called the law "a heavy blow [in the fight against] our country's harsh environmental realities, and an important systemic construct". Three previous versions of the bill were voted down. The bill is the first revision to the environmental protection law since 1989. Public interest environmental litigation increased further after the Tengger Desert case consolidated this change.

In 2015, China established the Air Pollution Prevention and Control Law.

As part of its effort to prioritize environmental protection, the central government in 2016 re-ordered reporting lines for environmental agencies below the provincial level and put them into a vertical leadership structure at the provincial level. This change greatly reduced the influence of local governments on the environmental protection process.

During 2016–2017, the MEP temporarily shut down approximately 40% of all Chinese factories as part of an environmental protection campaign. Between those two years, environmental protection inspections resulted in the disciplining, prosecution, and conviction of 17,000 officials.

Low carbon development was emphasized during the 19th CCP National Congress in 2017. During the opening session of the Congress, CCP General Secretary Xi Jinping described pollution control as one of "Three Critical Battles" (along with poverty alleviation and de-risking).

After several years of regional experiments in emissions trading systems, China started its national system on December 19, 2017.

In 2018, the Constitution of China was amended to include the concept of ecological civilization building, as part of amendments that emphasized environmental conservation and the scientific outlook on development.

In 2019, the MEE established the Belt and Road Initiative International Green Development Coalition as a joint project with the environmental agencies of twenty-five other countries.

By the early 2020s, China's urban areas were significantly healthier and more sustainable than a decade earlier.

In 2020, Xi announced that China aims to peak emissions before 2030 and go carbon-neutral by 2060 in accordance with the Paris climate accord. According to Climate Action Tracker, if accomplished it would lower the expected rise in global temperature by 0.2–0.3 degrees, "the biggest single reduction ever estimated by the Climate Action Tracker".

In 2020, a sweeping law was passed by the Chinese government to protect the ecology of the Yangtze River. The new laws include strengthening ecological protection rules for hydropower projects along the river, banning chemical plants within 1 kilometer of the river, relocating polluting industries, severely restricting sand mining as well as a complete fishing ban on all the natural waterways of the river, including all its major tributaries and lakes.

In November 2025, China joined the COP30 Climate Coalition proposal.

== Policy measures ==
=== Planning measures ===
China's Five-Year Plans are an important means of policy organization in the area of environmental protection. With the 11th Five-Year Plan, China introduced binding administrative targets which have been especially used in non-economic policy areas like environmental protection and land management.

The Climate Change Special Plan which is part of China's Fourteenth Five-Year Plan emphasizes ecologically oriented urban planning, including through means like urban green rings, public transportation, and bicycle lanes and walking paths.

=== Policy support for electronic vehicles ===
Electronic vehicle production has been a major success for China. Policy support for electric vehicles in China includes both government procurement and efforts to stimulate the private market for EVs.

During 2009 and 2010, China adopted policy measures to stimulate demand for new energy vehicles in both the public and private sectors. From 2010 to 2012, the government subsidized 40-60% of the cost of buying an electric vehicle. Additionally, many local governments provided policy support, including tax breaks and "special license plates that exempted drivers from local traffic restrictions. China also set a zero emissions mandate, requiring companies that manufacture or import more than 30,000 vehicles in a year to include a set percentage of electric vehicles (for 2019, this was 10%; it was 12% in 2020). Similarly, regulations strongly discourage the building of new factories that can only produce vehicles with internal combustion engines; unless hard to meet criteria are satisfied, new factories must also be able to produce electric vehicles. The central government also funds and mandates vehicle charging infrastructure, including providing incentives for building owners to add charging infrastructure.

Various forms of local government policy support for electric vehicles also exist. In Beijing, drivers of fully electric vehicles have much greater odds to be selected in the city's highly competitive license plate lottery and can drive their vehicles at any time (whereas the days when conventionally-powered vehicles can be used are restricted for traffic and air pollution control purposes). In Shanghai, license plates for fully-electric vehicles or plug-in hybrid vehicles are free.

As a result of China's policy support for electric vehicles, sales have skyrocketed in China, going from less than 10,000 units to 330,000 units sold in just four years. By 2018, 1.1 million electric cars were sold in China, representing an 80% increase from the prior year.

=== Policy support for solar power ===
China leads the world in both the deployment of solar power (with more than one-third of global capacity) and in solar manufacturing.

China's Sixth Five-Year Plan (1981–1985) was the first to address government policy support for solar PV panel manufacturing. Policy support for solar panel manufacturing has been a part of every Five-Year Plan since.

The 2008 financial crisis prompted significant stimulus efforts by China to invigorate its then-struggling solar industry.

The China Development Bank provided $20 billion of financing to domestic solar manufacturers in 2010.

China has provided feed-in-tariffs for solar power since at least 2011.

The 13th Five-Year Plan established a goal of 153.6 GW of solar capacity in China by 2020, as well as individual targets by province.

The value of Chinese solar technology exports has risen sharply, accounting for 3% ($32 billion) of the total value of China's exports in 2020. The CCP views solar technology production as dovetailing with its ambitions to transform China's economy toward higher value-added goods and services. The government spends heavily on solar research and development, with much of the funding coming from the Ministry of Science and Technology.

For the first half of 2022, China's investments in large scale solar increased 173 percent from the prior year, amounting to US$41 billion.

=== Policy support for eco-cities ===
Following the start of the Eleventh Five-Year Plan in 2006, China introduced a series of policies designed to encourage the development of sustainable cities.

Eco-cities in China are a significant component of the country's efforts to address climate change and promote sustainable urban development. The government has launched three programs to encourage the construction of ambitious urban projects that integrate environmental considerations with urban planning, aiming to create environmentally-friendly, low-carbon, and livable urban environments. The 17th National Congress of the Chinese Communist Party introduced the idea of a "low-carbon eco-city model" as part of a broader "eco-culture" framework, describing it as part of an effort to encourage sustained peace and common prosperity.

China's rapid urbanization and industrialization have contributed to environmental challenges, including increased greenhouse gas emissions, higher energy consumption, and pollution. By leveraging green technologies, sustainable infrastructure, and eco-friendly practices, Chinese eco-cities seek to reduce carbon emissions, enhance resource efficiency, and improve the quality of life for urban residents. More than 90% of Chinese cities have adopted eco-city programs.

=== Pollution control ===
China's pollution control measures include pollutant and carbon emissions trading systems. Pollutant trading is a regional cap-and-trade program for the trading of emissions permits for pollutants like sulfur dioxide and nitrogen oxides in industrial waste air, and ammonia nitrogen and chemical oxygen demand in wastewater. Its carbon emissions trading programs developed first through pilot programs at the province and city levels before the establishment of its national program in 2017.

Although China uses various market-oriented pollution control policy measures, including emissions trading, its top-down enforcement and command-and-control measures have generally proven more effective and led to significant air and water improvements by 2020.

Some local environmental bureaus use real-time emissions monitoring to detect violators or classify companies as compliant with regulations. These mechanisms have been developed by local governments as part of "hierarchical and categorical management" systems following the State Council's Planning Outline for the Construction of a Social Credit System (2014-2020). Within the environmental protection context, these systems classify companies based on their track record of violations or compliance, increase supervision of companies with questionable environmental records, and decrease burdens on companies with good environmental records.

=== Other policy support ===
The Chinese government requires mining companies to restore the environment around exhausted mines by refilling excavated pits and planting crops or trees. Many mining companies use these recovered mines for ecotourism business.

== Current law ==
At the national level, China has more than 20 environmental laws adopted by the National People's Congress, there are also over 140 executive regulations issued by the state council, and a series of sector regulations and environmental standards set by the State Environmental Protection Agency (SEPA). In 2003, the government of China proposed a new development concept emphasizing humanism and attempting to achieve sustainable development and harmony between man and nature, as well as coordinated socio-economic progress among various regions and with foreign countries. At the international level, China has also participated in treaties such as the Convention on Biological Diversity and the UN Millennium Development Goals, which include poverty alleviation, environmental protection and sustainable development.

When the new environmental protection provisions go into effect in January 2015, the government's environmental agencies will be allowed to enforce strict penalties and seize property of illegal polluters. Companies that break the law will be "named and shamed", with company executives subject to prison sentences of 15 days. There will be no upper limit on fines; previously, it was often cheaper for companies to pay the meager fines provisioned by the law than install anti-pollution measures. In all, the new law has 70 provisions, compared to the 47 of the existing law. More than 300 different groups will be able to sue on the behalf of people harmed by pollution. It remains to be seen whether these changes to the law will overcome some of the traditional problems with environmental litigation in China, such as difficulty getting cases accepted by the court, trouble gathering evidence and interference from local government.

Under the new law, local governments will be subject to discipline for failing to enforce environmental laws. Regions will no longer be judged solely on their economic progress, but instead must balance progress with environmental protection. Additionally, local governments will be required to disclose environmental information to the public. Individuals are encouraged to "adopt a low-carbon and frugal lifestyle and perform environmental protection duties" such as recycling their garbage under the law.

In June 2017, the Chinese government made a second amendment to the Water Pollution Prevention Act. Based on the first regulation of Water Pollution Prevention Act in 1996, the amendment will increase the punishment for water pollution and the penalty ceiling may be raised to 1 million yuan. According to the statement of the Minister of Environmental Protection, the second revised version further strengthened the responsibilities of local governments, and refined and improved the drinking water safety protection system. Since the legislation in 1984, this law has made a significant and positive contribution to improving the water environment in China. However, the quality of water environment in China is still not promising.

China has imposed an environmental protection tax since 2018 (the measure was passed in 2016 and became effective later). The goal of the tax is to protect the environment, reduce the discharge of pollutants, and promote ecological development. Taxable pollutants include solid waste, atmospheric pollutants, water pollutants, and noise.

=== Protected areas ===
A number of different classes of protected areas are recognized under Chinese law. National, provincial, and local governments all have the power to designate areas as protected. Regardless of designation, most enforcement is made at the local level.

== Current issues ==
Air pollution caused by industrial plants

China has many environmental issues, severely affecting its biophysical environment as well as human health.

=== Water resources ===
China is facing water resources problems such as pollution, shortages, and inefficiencies.

The government began to address water resources problems in the 1970s, establishing water pollution control and environmental protection agencies. In the 1990s, the central government established the National Environmental Quality Monitoring Network-Surface Water Monitoring System in various rivers and lakes to report water pollution data directly to the central government.

The Chinese government implemented two policies to alleviate the water shortage issues; supporting the South-North Water Diversion Project and improving water use efficiency. The government has provided funding for the South-North Water Diversion Project, which aims to bring 44.8 billion cubic meters of water to Beijing and other northern parts of China. The project will cause disruption to local inhabitants forcing the migration of nearly one million people. The total cost of this project is estimated at $62 billion. In 2010, the CCP and the State Council set policies to change ways of using water and improve water use efficiency. The central government had invested 1.8 trillion yuan to enable efficient water use by upgrading both agriculture irrigation systems and clean water systems in rural areas.

Besides the water shortage, the water quality is also an issue which has influenced public health and led to political disputes. Only less than half of all water resources meets the safe drinking water standards in China. Besides political oppositions between regions, the current government structure is also a barrier for water pollution control.

The Ministry of Ecology and Environment of China is a relatively young ministry. It is assigned relatively less power and fewer employees than other existing ministries, which results in its heavy dependence on local environmental protection bureaus (EPB). The problem is that local EPBs do not only get controlled by higher EPBs but also by local governments whose performance is assessed mainly by economic development. Therefore, the local governments have loose policies on companies that produce water pollution. Additionally, the financial support of EPBs comes from pollution fines instead of the Ministry of Ecology and Environment, which makes it difficult for the ministry to manage local EPBs.

=== Air pollution ===
Various forms of pollution have increased as China has industrialized, causing widespread environmental and health problems. In January 2013, fine airborne particulates rose as high as 993 micrograms per cubic meter in Beijing, compared with World Health Organization guidelines of no more than 25. Heavy industry, dominated by state-owned enterprises, has been promoted since the beginning of central planning and still has many special privileges such as access to cheap energy and loans. The industry possesses considerable power to resist environmental regulation.

At the end of October 2018, the Chinese government has issued the Atmospheric Pollution Prevention and Control Law (2018 Amendment), which will be implemented starting immediately. Experts believe that although the law is inevitably flawed in some aspects, if 80% of the law can be implemented, it is going to significantly improve the air quality. This law has been scrutinized three times. The new amendment has clearly stated out that enterprises of iron and steel, building materials, non-ferrous metals, petroleum, and chemical industry that discharge dust, sulfide, and nitrogen oxides in the course of production shall adopt cleaner production processes, construct dust-removing, desulfurization, and denitrification equipment in a complete set, or adopt technological transformation and other measures to control the discharge of air pollutants. Compared to the revised Air Pollution Control Law in 2000, the new version doubled the entries.

Based on 2015's China Environmental Bulletin published by the Chinese government, in 2015 the national urban air quality is getting better. The first implementation of the new air quality standards has made the PM 2.5 average concentration decreased by 14.1% compared to the year of 2014. The Ministry of Finance established a fund of 10.6 billion Yuan to improve the air quality and to control the air pollution around the Beijing-Tianjin-Hebei and the surrounding areas, Yangtze River, and other key areas. The government is also actively promoting renewable energy vehicles with an annual production of 390,000, four times more than the production in 2014.

The amount of harmful particulates in the air in China fell 40% from 2013 to 2020.

=== Soil pollution ===
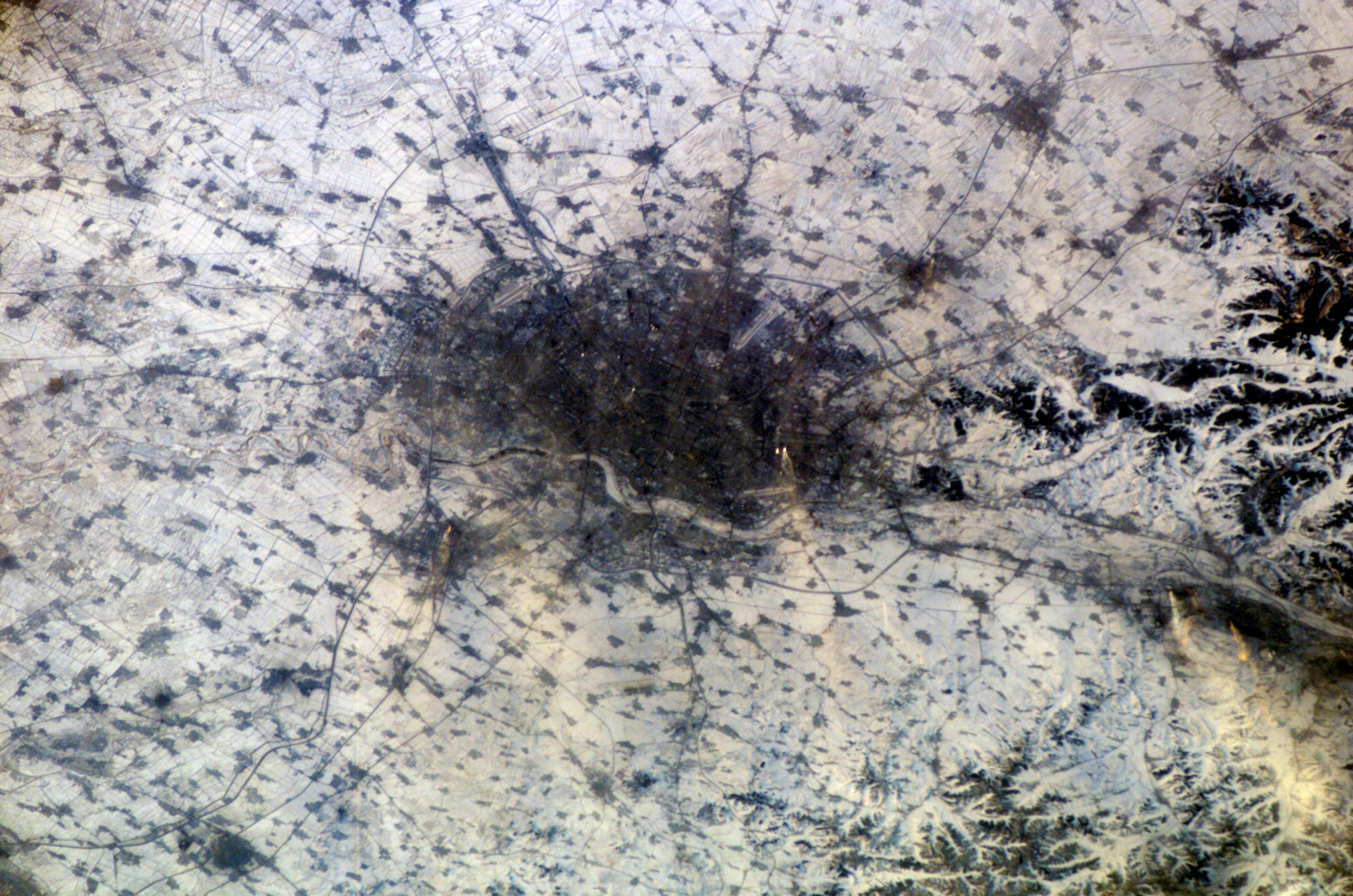
Soil pollution satellite image

Soil pollution problems, which is the land surface degradation caused by the abuse of resources and land caused by human activities, together with corresponding protection measures in China have occurred in recent decades. In total, nearly 16.1% of China's soil was polluted. These pollutions have caused a serious impact on the growth of crops and the health of the people. In terms of related policies, the Chinese government decided to draw on the successful examples of other countries and integrate China's national conditions to maintain long-term governance of soil pollution problems. From the 1980s to the 1990s, China began to work on soil environmental research by starting the Modern conservation tillage research with the support of Australia. From 2000 to now, the problem of soil pollution in China has become increasingly serious. The government has gradually put the prevention and control of soil pollution issues and other environmental protection issues in the first place by charging fines for polluted factories.

China conducted a large-scale soil quality sampling analysis nationwide from 2005 to 2013, and according to the National Soil Pollution Survey Bulletin promulgated by the Ministry of Environmental Protection of China in 2014, the total national soil exceedance rate (the percentage that exceeds the upper limit value) was 16.1%, of which slight, slight, moderate and heavy degree of pollution spot is 11.2%, 2.3%, 1.5% and 1.1%, respectively. From the point of view of pollution distribution, soil pollution in the south is heavier than in the north. The soil pollution problems in some regions such as the Yangtze River Delta, the Pearl River Delta, and the old industrial base in Northeast China are more severe. The soil in the southwest and south-central regions has exceeded the upper limit of heavy metals tolerance. The contents of the four inorganic pollutants such as cadmium, mercury, arsenic, and lead have gradually increased from northwest China to southeast China and from northeast China to southwest China.

In June 2017, the Ministry of Environmental Protection pointed out that China will establish a more refined working mechanism, continue to carry out investigation of soil pollution, promote the improvement of the legislative system, and fully cooperate with the National People's Congress in the legislation on soil pollution control law. In 2019, the Soil Pollution Prevention and Control Law of China came into effect. Under this law, regulators can require liable parties to remediate agricultural land (if the pollutants found in harvested crops exceed specified levels) and for construction land (pollutant concentrations exceed soil pollution risk management standards). The law also establishes government invested funds for agricultural land soil pollution prevention and control, and for soil risk management and remediation where the land user or liable party cannot be identified.

=== Desertification ===
Land desertification is another pressing environmental issue. A land survey conducted by the State Forestry Administration of China from 2013 to 2016 shows that 2.61 million km^{2} of the national land, accounting for more than a quarter of China's overall territory, is desertified. Arid, semi-arid, and sub-humid lands located in Northern and North-Western China make up for the majority of the affected territory. Desertification has long reaching consequences, resulting in ecological degradation, halting local economic development, as well as damaging the health of residents in the affected area. Desertified land facilitates the creation of sandstorms which threaten the health of residents in the nearby rural and urban areas alike. As the desert expands, it turns more and more land non-arable and unsuitable for development, creating poverty and food shortage. The current issue is a result of the combination of various anthropogenic and ecological factors. Devegetation brought about by unfavourable hydrologic conditions, climate change induced droughts, as well as unsustainable human activities such as overgrazing, agriculture, and deforestation, exposes the soil to frequent water and wind erosion, creating desert.

To combat land desertification, China has implemented a range of legislative policies as well as restorative programs. Laws are passed to prevent logging, agriculture, and animal grazing in locations of high desertification risk, establishing these areas as ecological function reserves. In areas surrounding desertified land, a large scale of protective forests and shelterbelts are created by programs such as the Three-Norths Shelter Forest Construction Program to reduce the effect of wind erosion. Since 1999, The Ministry of Forestry has been providing monetary rewards for farmers who plant trees instead of crops, as well as auctioning away national land to individuals to rehabilitate for economic gains. In 2002, The Sand Prevention and Control Law was introduced to encourage sustainable development in desertified areas, encouraging afforestation and establishment of green industries such as water efficient pasture and natural pharmaceutical production. This policy is met with wide support from the residents in these areas as it also stimulates local economic growth. Residents in the Kubuqi Desert, for example, have had their annual income increased from $56 to $2000 in less than 30 years.

=== Coal Over-Mining ===
Currently, China is the largest consumer and producer of coal worldwide. The energy endowment in China has long been characterized as coal-rich and gas-poor. This dependence on coal is caused by the abundant coal resources but limited resources in natural gas and petroleum. In 2006, 5.85% of China's GDP was directly attributed to coal.

The heavy demand leads to over-mining of coal. Ecological degradation is one of the greatest damage caused by coal mining in China. Over-mining causes land subsidence and land sliding. In areas with abundant coal resources such as Huainan city in Anhui Province, land subsidence persistently happens because of over-mining. Land subsidence destroys houses, roads, bridges, and electricity facilities in the coal mining areas. By December 3, 2006, the coral mine created 700,000 hectares of land subsidence nationwide and total damage worth 50 billion yuan.

To change the structure of energy consumption and alleviate the damage due to coal mining, the Chinese government came up with 2 policies: the Coal Law of the People's Republic of China and the West-East Gas Pipeline Project. The Coal Law of the People's Republic of China was formulated for the purpose of standardizing and legalizing China's coal industry. It helps to protect coal resources, regulate coal production and business activities, and promote and ensure the development of the coal industry. The Coal Law of the People's Republic of China was implemented since December 1, 1996.

The West-East Gas Pipeline Project focuses on transporting natural gas from western to eastern part of China through pipelines. The western part of China has 6 main petroliferous basins, including the Tarim Basin, the Junggar Basin, the Turpan Basin, the Qaidam Basin, the Ordos Basin and the Sichuan Basin. Since the 1990s, oil prospectors have successively discovered petroleum reservoirs of different sizes such as Kela 2, Hotanhe, Yaha, Yangtuke, Yingmai 7, Yudong 2, in the western part of the Tarim basin. A pipeline project was established in 2000, transporting natural gas from the Kuqa–Tabei region to China's industrial east. Located within the Tarim Basin, the region has a total of 393.522 billion cubic meters of natural gas reserves, in which 285.471 billion cubic meters could be exploited. Specifically, Kela 2, Yangtake, Yingmai 7, Yudong, Yaha, Jilac, and Yakela are the seven main supply reservoirs in the Kuga-Tabei region. The above seven gas fields have an aggregate volume of 380.534 billion cubic meters in reserves, of which 2704.02 billion cubic meters can be exploited from. This nationwide network provides a solution to the gas resource disparity in China and helped China to address its rapid-growing demand on energy. Since the implementation of this pipeline in February, 2000, this project efficiently reduced China's reliance on coal. By 2021, the West-East Gas Pipeline helped to reduce he use of standard coal by 932 million metric tons, lessened carbon dioxide emission by 1.02 billion tons, and lowered carbon dioxide dust by 508 million tons.

== Impact ==
China's lax environmental oversight had contributed to its environmental problems. Sixteen of the world's twenty most polluted cities were found in China in 2013, but has since reduced to just one at 19th place Government response has been criticized as inadequate. An official report released in 2014, found that 20% of the country's farmland, and 16% of its soil overall, is polluted. An estimated 60% of the groundwater is polluted.

According to the U.S. Environmental Protection Agency, China has shown great determination to "develop, implement, and enforce a solid environmental law framework" However, the impact of such efforts is not yet clear. The harmonization of Chinese society and the natural environment is billed as one of the country's top national priorities.

International groups called the law revision passed in April 2014 a positive development, but cautioned seeing the laws through to implementation would be a challenge.

Because China does not have a fully established legal system, enterprise executives base their environmental practices largely on perceptions about regulators rather than concerns for legal issues, according to a 2014 study published in Journal of Public Administration Research and Theory. One executive interviewed said that China's environmental regulations were "comprehensive" but yet "vague," leaving local officials with large discretion in terms of enforcement. If executives think local officials may arbitrarily target their enterprises for enforcement, they are likely to adopt proactive practices, such as "developing certifiable environmental management systems," but not basic ones, such as waste recycling.

== See also ==
- Belt and Road Initiative International Green Development Coalition
- Clear waters and green mountains
- Environmental history of China
- Environmentalism in China
- Climate change in China
- Climate policy of China
- Debate over China's economic responsibilities for climate change mitigation
- Yangtze River Economic Belt
