= 2005 Huashui protest =

Protest in Zhejiang

The 2005 Huashui protest took place in Huashui (画水) Town, Dongyang (东阳) County, Zhejiang Province (浙江省), China, in March and April 2005. The Huashui protest began as opposition to pollution from the Zhuxi Chemical Industrial Park (竹溪工业园), which had been affecting villages in the area since its construction in 2001. After the Dongyang County leadership intervened by sending in officials and police officers to disperse the protesters in what is known as the April 10th Incident, the protest developed to oppose the local government's repression, too.

The protest was notable for its participants, mostly elderly residents of the most seriously affected site Huaxi (花溪) No. 5 village, for the theatrical tactics employed by protestors, and for its success in shutting down 11 of the 13 factories in the chemical park.

== Background ==
=== October 2001 protest ===
Construction on the Zhuxi Chemical Industrial Park began in October 2001, with Dongnong Chemical Industry Company (东农化工), a pesticide factory, set to relocate to land belonging to Huaxi and Huangshan villages. The Huaxi No. 5 village Party secretary opposed this move, writing a pamphlet titled "A portrait of Dongnong Company" and disseminating it to villagers to inform them of the dangers of Dongnong's pollution to health and environment. Villagers took note of the damaging effects of the factory's pollution in the village of Luzhai and became additionally concerned with the effects of pollution on their families and lineages. In response, they questioned local officials whether Dongnong produced toxic waste, which officials countered by saying that Dongnong met all environmental criteria.

Dissatisfied with official responses, villagers forced the Huashui Town Party secretary to walk barefoot around the factory complex and smell the factory waste, and some also vandalized or stole property in what became known as the October 20th Incident. However, this early protest did not stop the relocation of Dongnong to Huaxi and Huangshan territory, and some villagers were prosecuted and imprisoned for disturbing social order.

=== Zhuxi Chemical Park expansion ===
The "October 20th Incident" deterred follow-up protests for the next two and a half years. The Zhuxi Chemical Park expanded to about 960 mu (64 ha (160 acres)) and included 13 factories, which mainly produced chemicals, pesticides, dyes, and pharmaceuticals. Many of these factories generated substantial air and water pollution; production of weedkillers and defoliators in particular killed much local vegetation and crops. In July 2003, residents of Xishan Village found that their entire green rice field had turned yellow and withered, and many other villagers who relied on agriculture as their main source of income had similar experiences. Many crops affected by pollution were also feared to be poisoned, so villagers in the Huashui Town region were not only unable to sell their cash crops, but were also forced to buy vegetables for personal use from other towns outside the polluted area, causing vegetable prices to surge.

=== Government policies on land regulation ===
In China, land-related regulations are more straightforward than environmental laws, and from 2003 to 2004, the central government became more committed to disciplining local governments that had violated such regulations. In December 2003, the central government stipulated that all developmental zones established by county officials or lower-ranking authorities should be shut down, and that lower-level government authorities that complied and carried out "self-checking and self-rectification" (自查自纠) would receive more lenient treatments. Most local governments, including those of Zhejiang province and Dongyang county, complied in order to avoid punishment and nominally revoked the licenses of the illegal industrial parks within their jurisdiction without actually halting factory activity. In April 2004, the Zhejiang provincial government listed the Zhuxi Chemical Park on a list of sites to be shut down, and in July 2004, the Dongyang county government issued documents instructing any illegally seized land to be returned to the Huaxi villagers.

==== Response ====
Villagers understood that their 2001 protest on the grounds of environmental pollution had failed, partly because not enough time had passed to prove the definitive relationship between pollution and illness or other health effects. As a result, they petitioned to remove the Zhuxi Chemical Park based on violation of land regulations and ownership rights since the park had been built on illegally seized land. This process included sending representatives to file complaints at government offices in Zhejiang Province and in Beijing, for which villagers fundraised for two years. Later on, villagers used the documents issued by the Zhejiang and Dongyang governments as evidence and fuel for their second round of protests, and during the 2005 action, much of the initial protesting was land-oriented.

== Protest ==
=== Events ===
On March 24, 2005, residents of Huaxi No. 5 village took peaceful direct action against the Zhuxi Chemical Park and set up a tent at the entrance, hoping to block deliveries of supplies to the factories. The following evening, local officials and police dismantled the tent, but the protesters immediately erected a second one, with this process occurring three times. Over the next 10 days, residents of 10 other nearby villages joined in the protest, and each village erected its own tent despite attempts of authorities to pull them down.

County leadership then employed a team of 60 people to conduct "thought work" to influence protesters to leave the encampment. Protesters responded to such repression tactics by pestering the "thought workers," calling them traitors acting against the villages' interests, and forcing local leaders to give speeches, then preventing them from leaving until they promised to halt pollution and gave a date for doing so. For most of late March and early April, protesters maintained moderate protest tactics like kowtowing to local officials and police officers, and the protest site became a center of entertainment, drawing many onlookers from nearby villages. Despite the detention of several protest leaders, the number of tents outside the chemical park continued to grow, reaching about two dozen by April 9.

At about 3 am on April 10, over 1,500 local officials and public security personnel were sent to dismantle the encampment. The protesters resisted and violence broke out, injuring over 100 officials or police officers and over 200 villagers and damaging 68 government vehicles. One villager recounted that several thousand officials drove up in 60 to 70 vehicles carrying knives, truncheons, and gas canisters. Local reports stated that the violence began after a police vehicle allegedly crushed an elderly woman, and that protesters responded by smashing windows, attacking police officers who had used tear gas, and overturning police cars and buses.

=== Aftermath ===
Villagers regarded such repression as excessive when dealing with mostly peaceful, elderly protesters. As a result, protesters turning to more aggressive tactics like mock funerals, big-character posters, interrogations of factory owners, and breaking into the homes of people deemed as traitors to the protest, which became part of an extensive "protest spectacle".

Over 50,000 people from beyond local towns came to the chemical park after the April 10th Incident, according to villager accounts. Many of these onlookers made financial contributions and offered moral support to the protesters, and the presence of such large crowds attracted media and higher level government attention to Huaxi.

Pressure from the villagers, central government, and widespread media attention eventually caused the Dongyang county government to close 11 of the factories in the park, and protesters finally took down their tents on May 20. An investigation after the protest revealed that pollution from the park had affected about 11,685 mu (779 ha (1,920 acres)) of land in the park's vicinity.

== Significance ==
=== Mobilization of elderly protesters ===
The group of protesters was mainly composed of elderly people, who were chosen as protesters because of their spare time and limited family responsibilities, local legal limitations on detaining individuals over 70 years old, and the general disapproval of state representatives using force on the elderly.

Elderly protesters were mobilized by the Societies of Senior Citizens (SSCs) of various villages in Huashui Town. While SSCs are generally non-political organizations focused on community service for the elderly, some SSCs promote economic growth and participate in determining land usage and development projects in their regions. At the time of the Huashui protests, the SSCs of Huashui Town were relatively autonomous from local politics and were able to engage in economic and political activities that other organizations like the Communist Youth League and Public Safety Committee, belonging to the village party committee, could not.

Prior to the 2005 protest, the Huaxi No. 5 village SSC worked to fundraise for protesters who had been imprisoned after the October 20th Incident in 2001 and was active in petitioning the local and central government regarding environmental and land rights. During the 2005 protest, the Huaxi No. 5 SSC encouraged elderly villagers to participate in the protests, offered salaries for participating, organized logistics for the protesters, and pressured SSC members that did not join the protest immediately. Additionally, the SSCs from Huaxi, Huangshan, and Xishan provided crucial assistance in recruiting additional participants to the protest from other nearby villages.

=== Protest tactics ===
Initially, protesters, who were mostly elderly women, brought various household items and cooking tools to the site to spend their time in the tents eating, sleeping, and socializing. They were instructed by protest leaders not to touch people or cars going into the factories, nor to enter the chemical park. As a form of protest, tent-sitting also attracted many people to the protest site, and after only a few days, the encampment took on the atmosphere of an open-air market with small crowds and food stands

Later on, many of the escalated tactics employed by elderly protesters were successful due to their connections to Chinese culture. While kowtowing to younger members of the "thought work" team, elderly protesters wore white robes, burned incense, chanted "We beg you to save us" (求求你么救救我们), and placed handfuls of dirt with incense onto officials' cars. Although these mock funeral proceedings began as ambiguous processes, protesters also held mock funerals specific individuals, like the county party secretary who had approved the repression. His "funeral," held on May 5, included big-character posters, an urn, a photograph of him, and burning incense, and attracted more than 10,000 people. These occurrences were regarded as inauspicious, and were perceived as wishing a shortened life on the government officials and police officers.

Protesters also used remnants of police uniforms, batons, helmets, shields, knives, tear gas shells, and red armbands from the violence on April 10 to decorate the protest site. These items served as evidence to prove the protesters' stories in the face of contradictory media reports, and also attracted additional spectators and attention to the protest site, adding pressure on the local government to resolve the situation.

== See also ==
- Environmental issues in China
- Environmental policy in China
- Environmental governance in China
- Protest and dissent in China
