= Wu Lihong =

Chinese environmentalist

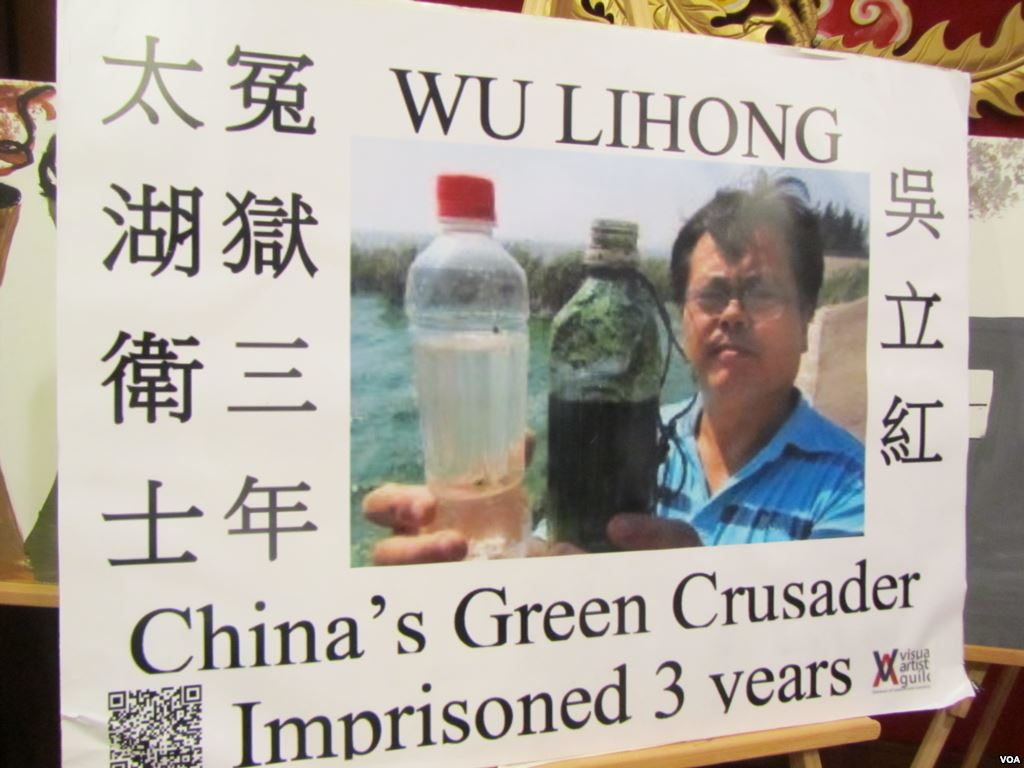

Wu Lihong (simplified Chinese: 吴立红; traditional Chinese: 吳立紅; pinyin: Wú Lìhóng; born 1968) is an environmental activist of the People's Republic of China. In August 2007, Wu was sentenced to prison by a local court in retribution for a 10-year crusade against pollution in Lake Tai. Ironically, the lake has been suffering from a "pond scum" outbreak since May, verifying Wu's claims that the government and big business were polluting and endangering the ecology of a water system that provides water for over 2 million people.

The New York Times ran an online article on his plight on 14 October 2007. An excerpt follows:

"Mr. Wu, a jaunty, 40-year-old former factory salesman, pioneered a style of intrepid, media-savvy environmental work that made Lake Tai, and the hundreds of chemical factories on its shores, the focus of intense regulatory scrutiny.

In 2005 he was declared an “Environmental Warrior” by the National People’s Congress. His address book contained cellphone numbers for officials in Beijing and the provincial capital of Nanjing who outranked the party bosses where he lived.

But Mr. Wu was far from untouchable. He lost his job. His wife lost hers. The police summoned, detained and interrogated him. The local government and factory owners also tried for years to bring him into the fold with contracts, gifts and jobs. When party officials offered him a chance to profit handsomely from a pollution cleanup contract, a friend warned him not to accept. Mr. Wu, who needed the money, said yes.

The country’s third largest freshwater body, Lake Tai, or Taihu in Chinese, has long provided the people of the lower Yangtze River Delta with both their wealth and their conception of natural beauty.

It nurtured a bounty of the “three whites,” white shrimp, whitebait and whitefish, and a freshwater crustacean delicacy called the hairy crab. Natural and man-made streams irrigated rice paddies, and a network of canals ferried that produce far and wide.

Along the lake’s northern reaches, near the city of Wuxi, placid waters and misty hills captured the imagination of Chinese for hundreds of years. The wealthy built gardens that featured the lake’s wrinkled, water-scarred limestone rocks set in groves of bamboo and chrysanthemum."

== Pollution of Lake Tai ==
In May 2007, the lake was overtaken by a major algal bloom. Authorities are blaming this on the lowest water levels in 50 years. However, low water levels alone did not cause these blooms. Increases in nutrients, from fertilizer for example, create conditions conducive to algae blooms, which has polluted the water with a toxic blue substance and a stink smell, making the water unusable. The Chinese government has called the lake a major natural disaster despite the clearly anthropogenic origin of this environmental catastrophe. With the average price of bottled water rising to six times the normal rate, the government has banned all regional water providers from implementing price hikes. Wuxi, which draws its tap water from the lake, has been particularly badly affected. As of October 2007, the Chinese government had shut down or given notice to over 1,300 factories around the lake. Some say that only unprofitable factories have been closed, others view the anti-pollution move as overkill. Despite Chinese authorities' increasing awareness of environmental problems, Wu Lihong was arrested and tried for alleged extortion of one of the polluters (see Economist article). He received a three-year prison sentence. Released on April 12, 2010, Wu Lihong told journalists that he suffered brutal treatment during his three-year detention.

== See also ==
- Environment of China
- Environmental issues in China
- Tan Kai, a computer technician and an environmental activist from Zhejiang
