= Clear waters and green mountains =

Political slogan

- Traditional Chinese: 綠水青山
- Simplified Chinese: 绿水青山
Transcriptions
Standard Mandarin
- Hanyu Pinyin: lǜ shuǐ, qīng shān

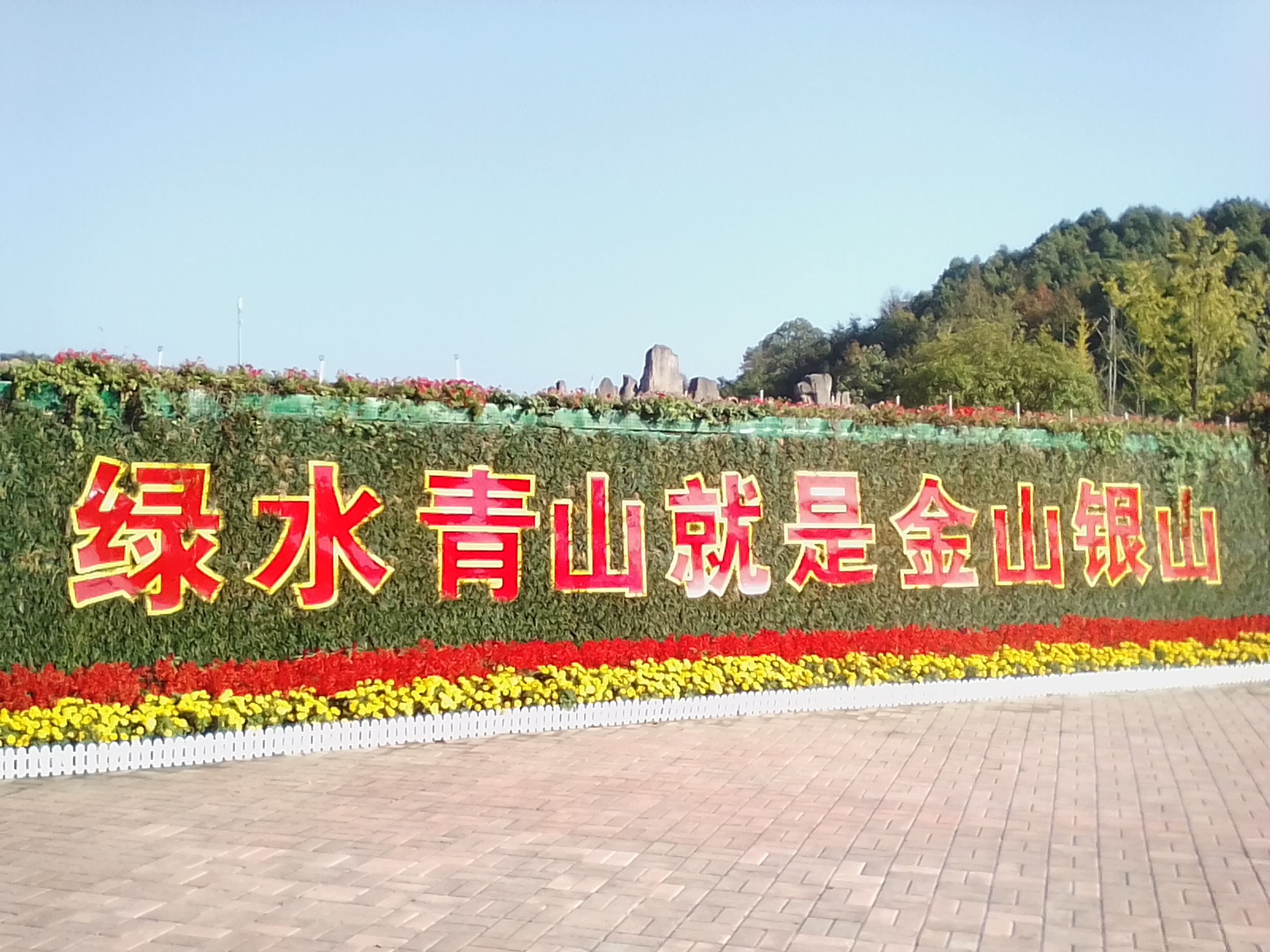
Clear waters and green mountains slogans at the Changsha Ecological Zoo

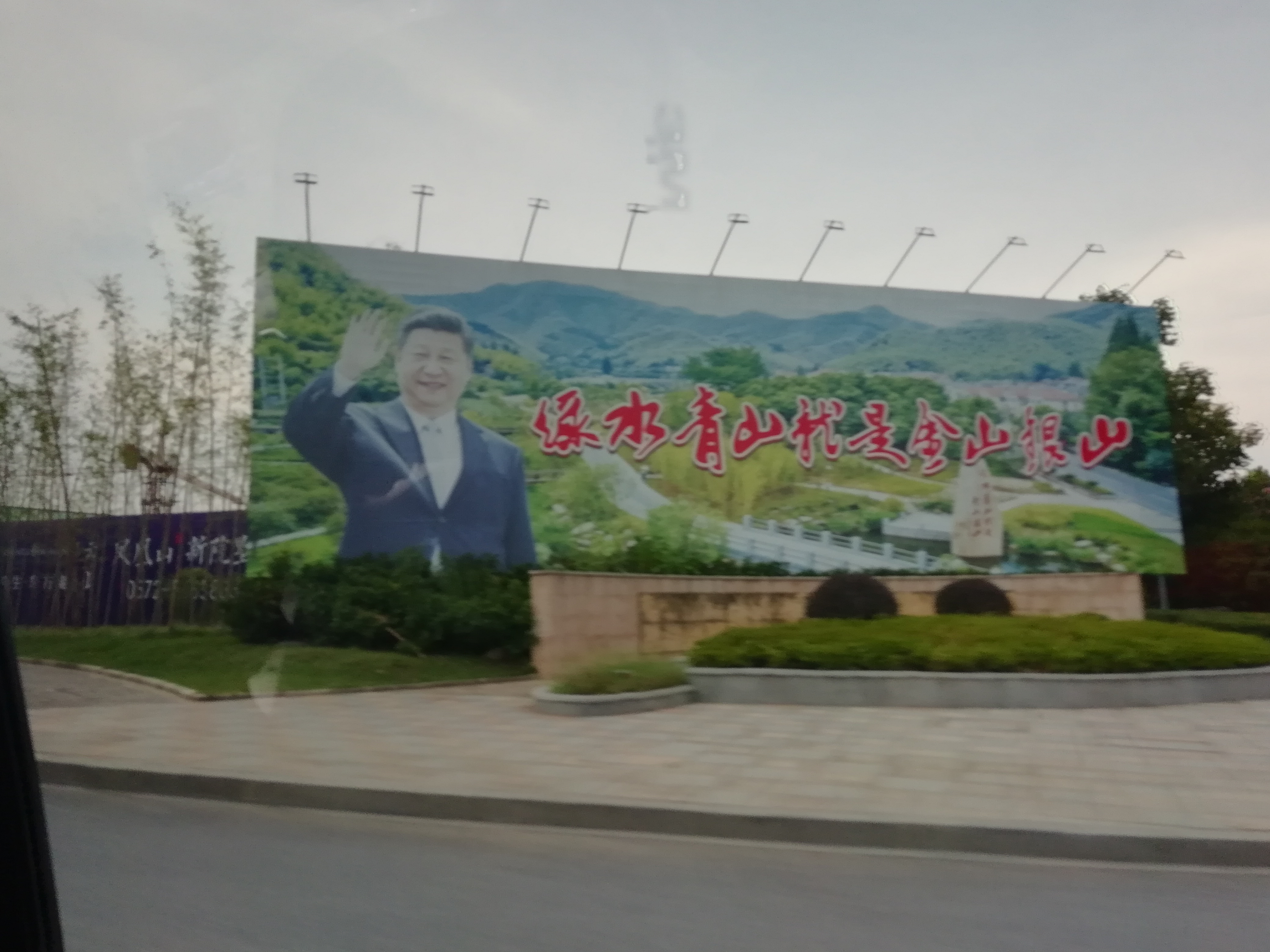
"Clear waters and green mountains are [as valuable as] gold and silver mountains" shown on a billboard in Anji County

Clear waters and green mountains, alternatively green mountains are gold mountains or two mountain theory, refers to a political slogan on environmental policy formulated by Chinese Communist Party (CCP) general secretary Xi Jinping. The full slogan is "clear waters and green mountains are as valuable as gold and silver mountains" (Chinese: 绿水青山就是金山银山). (Note: The literal translation is "green waters and green mountains are gold mountains and silver mountains.")

== History and usage ==
Anji County is a county under the jurisdiction of Huzhou, Zhejiang Province, where the local economy was once in a relatively underdeveloped state, and the people of the whole county hope to accelerate the county's economic development. However, local people have always been confused about whether economic development must be at the expense of the environment. In particular, villagers in Yucun (Chinese: 余村), which Xi visited, have opened mines and cement factories to promote economic development, capitalizing on natural resources. In the 1990s, Yucun's collective economic income amounted to more than 3 million yuan per year, making it Anji's "richest village," and more than half of the village's 280 families worked in the mines. However, local villagers have been worried about the explosions, air pollution and water pollution caused by mining, which has led to a decrease in the production of bamboo shoots in the area, and the ecosystem of the whole village has been seriously damaged. Similar problems were encountered in Miaoxi Township (Chinese: 妙西镇) of Huzhou, as well as in the whole of Zhejiang Province. In 2003, Huzhou proposed the goal of creating an eco-municipality, and Anji County under the jurisdiction of Huzhou also proposed the goal of creating the country's first eco-county, and decided to shut down mines, cement factories and other high-polluting enterprises. However, after the closure of the highly polluting enterprises, the local economic indicators declined, and the local people initiated a discussion on whether to continue mining.

On August 15, 2005, Xi Jinping, then secretary of the Zhejiang Provincial Committee of the Communist China Party, made his second visit to Anji County, Huzhou City, where he held a meeting in a modest conference room in Yu Village, Tianhuangping Township. When Bao Xinmin, then secretary of the Yu Village Party branch, reported on the closure of the mines, Xi recognized the local villagers' determination to shut down the quarry and cement factory, calling it a "brilliant move." Xi also devoted a major portion of his speech to systematically explaining the theory that "green water and green mountains are golden mountains and silver mountains". On August 24, 2005, Xi Jinping published the commentary "Green water and green mountains are also golden mountains and silver mountains" in the Zhejiang Daily's New Words of Zhijiang column.

Following the 2012 ascension of Xi as the CCP general secretary (paramount leader), the slogan has been invoked in various contexts domestically and internationally by Chinese officials, complementing existing emphasis on the achievement of ecological civilization. It was given greater emphasis in Chinese state media beginning in 2015, after Xi began to focus more on environmental issues.

On March 24, 2015, Xi Jinping presided over a meeting of the Politburo of the Chinese Communist Party and adopted the Opinions on Accelerating the Promotion of Ecological Civilization Construction, in which the concept of "green water and green mountains is golden silver mountains" was formally written into the Opinions for the first time in a central document.

In May 2016, the United Nations Environment Programme (UNEP) published the report "Green Water and Green Mountains are Golden Mountains: China's Ecological Civilization Strategy and Action" based on the "Two Mountains Theory", and on October 18, 2017, the "Two Mountains Theory" was written into the report of the 19th National Congress of the Chinese Communist Party. The report pointed out that "adhering to the harmonious coexistence of human beings and nature, we must establish and practice the concept that green water and green mountains are golden silver mountains", citing that China fully focus on sustainable development.

On March 30, 2020, Xi Jinping, as the General Secretary of the Chinese Communist Party, once again visited Yucun Village in Anji County, and affirmed the practice of Yucun Village of practicing this theory, developing a green economy, and driving the villagers to increase their income and become rich, and said that the concept of the two mountains has become the consensus and action of the whole party and the whole society, and has become an important part of the new concept for development.

== Theory ==
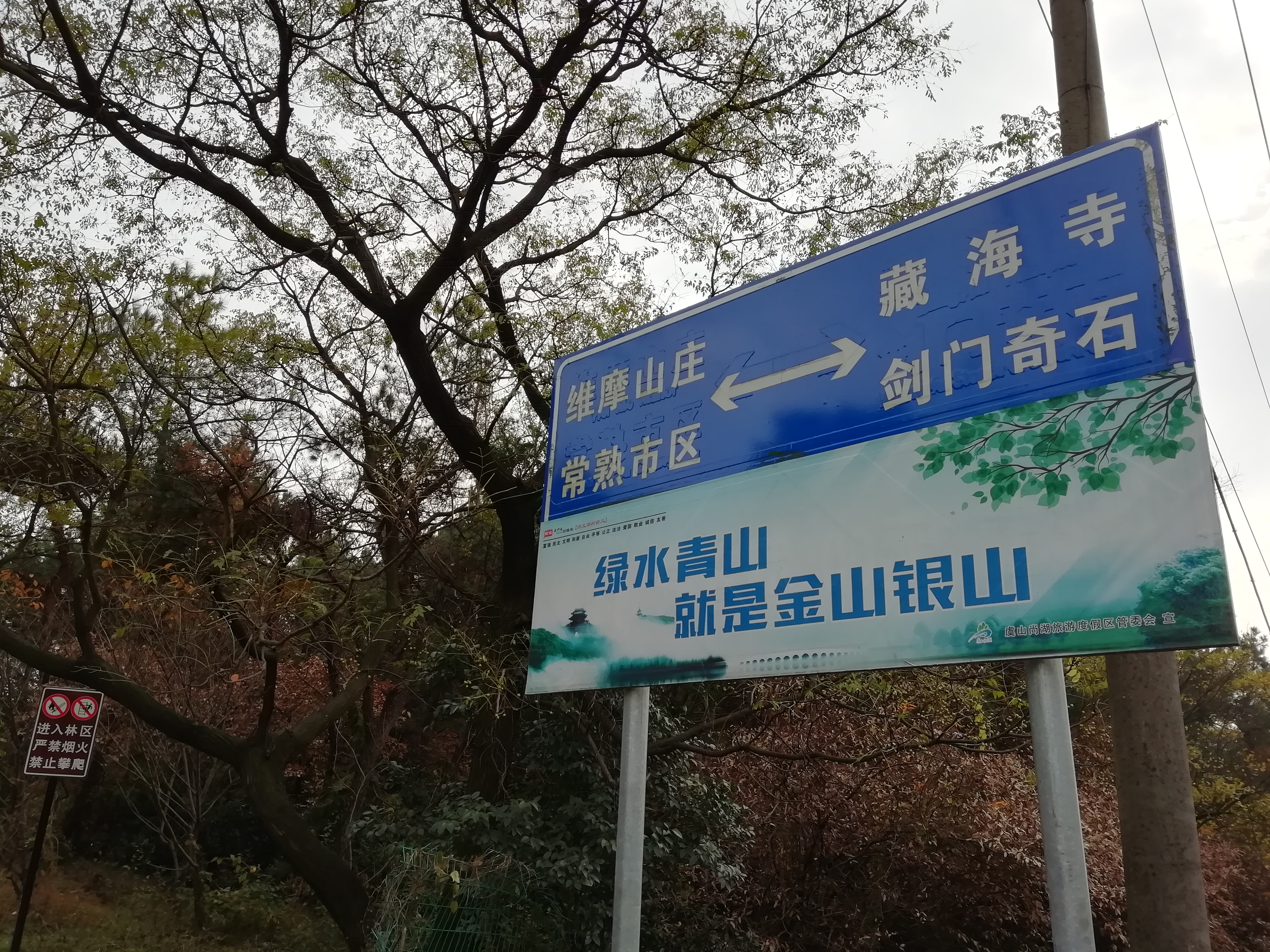
"Green Water and Green Mountain is Gold Mountain and Silver Mountain" slogan, taken in Yushan, Changshu, China.

The Beijing Review maintains that the slogan "reflects a people-centered approach to people's wellbeing, an approach that emphasizes the importance of harmony between man and nature, and embodies the unwavering resolve of the Party and the government to preserve and protect the natural environment."

"Clear waters and green mountains" alludes to what Xi observed as phases of economic development in relation to environmentalism. In the first phase, initial industrialization, little regard is given to the environment, which is sacrificed in pursuit of economic growth. As people become more aware of the importance of the environment, they call for its preservation and protection in second phase. Finally, society realizes that "clear waters and green mountains" and "gold and silver mountains" are not mutually exclusive, and in fact the former can bestow the latter.

The slogan implies that economic development must accommodate economic protection.

== Television Production ==
- Documentary "Green Water and Green Mountain is Golden Silver Mountain", produced by the Publicity Department of Zhejiang Provincial Committee of the Chinese Communist Party and Zhejiang Radio and Television Group, aired on Zhejiang Television from August 11 to 13, 2015
- The TV series "Green Love" (Chinese: 青恋), which centers on the "Two Mountains Theory" and tells the inspirational story of a new generation of young creators who are striving to build a new countryside, was aired on CCTV-1 and Zhejiang Television in 2017.

== See also ==
- Anji County
- Grain for Green (Chinese: 退耕还林)
- Ideology of the Chinese Communist Party
- Environmental policy in China
