= Environmentalism in China =

Environmentalism in China uses philosophical concepts, governmental policies and local movements in order to address environmental issues. The Chinese government establishes policies to grow its economy sustainably, while environmental protests raises awareness for climate change.

Within the governing Chinese Communist Party (CCP), the concepts of ecological Marxism, eco-socialism, and ecological civilization are key elements of national environmental policy. Ecological Marxism has many interpretations in which it is generally criticizing capitalist driven environmental degradation and it involves both environmental sustainability and socialist ideals.This concept can be defined as the thought that capitalism accumulation has led to the eventual collapse of the environment through commodifying aspects of nature. Eco-socialism is like ecological Marxism but differs in the fact that it infuses traditional socialism with the environmental movement. Ecological civilization is the current term used by the Chinese government to explain their new environmental policy, yet whether it is considered radical or conservative is determined by who is analyzing the policy. While all these theories share similar foundations and views of the future, they are all theoretically different and view the methods to obtain their future differently. These theories have made an impact on China and the CCP in general on how they implement environmental protection and the language they use to describe the policies.

== Theoretical overview ==
=== Ecological Marxism in China ===
Ecological Marxism emerged in 1979 in the book Western Marxism: An Introduction, Classical and Contemporary sources by Ben Agger. Though it has been discussed since then by a wide array of thinkers, there is no set definition of the term, but more a collection of varying ideas. The term is based on the idea that the effects of capitalist accumulation and growth on the environment will lead to eventual collapse and that commodifying nature is unmanageable. John Foster explains how the term ecological Marxism can be misleading since Marxism was not written in terms that benefit nature and therefore the scientific influences might not be accommodating to ecology. Rather, ecology in this theory is referring to movements and ideas about nature and how capitalism relates to it. It discusses the failure of capitalists in understanding of nature and seeing its sources as inexhaustible and the relentless pollution and degradation of these natural resources. James O'Connor explains that ecological Marxism is "the drive for the endless accumulation of capital—and the state system that support that drive—leads to the undermining of the very processes that enable the reproduction of capital." Capitalism is naturally opposed to ecological balance because it rests upon the destruction of the surrounding environment for the sake of accumulation. This accumulation rests upon having an outlet of unethical actions, such as dumping, and pollution with no end in sight. Since capitalism sees its future as endless growth, the surrounding environment itself must create an endless access to extract resources and dump waste. Furthermore, the resources that allow capitalism to produce more are treated as commodities, yet these aren't real commodities. Described as 'fictitious commodities', nature cannot be given a money value and this absence of exchange value creates a violent appropriation of resources by the state and capitalists.

China incorporates Ecological Marxism into its policy rhetoric in order to insert into its framework for sustainable development and create an environmental governance. While this theory may provide a foundation for a new method of building China and protecting its environment, it has led to self-criticism of government policy or other nations' complicity in China's environmental record. Ecological Marxism is supposed to be the antidote to capitalist logic about endless accumulation and reveal the destructive policies capitalism has on the environment. Critics argue that ecological Marxism in China faces challenges when implemented in practice. One issue is balancing environmental reforms with economic growth because there are many industries that assist with China's economic growth that contribute to the environmental crisis. Another issue would be the global economic framework that depends on China's industries that creates external pressures that hinder China's ability to improve its environmental state. Additionally, there is question to whether or no ecological Marxism can address modern environmental concerns, such as tech pollutions and renewable energy transitions. Although ecological Marxism can offer criticisms on capitalist driven degradation of the environment, these limitations suggest that China's shift to improve climate change and maintain the economy requires more innovative and flexible policy adaptations. While some scholars may argue that China (as a socialist state) is better positioned to adopt these policies, others focus on the contradictions in the country's reliance on market driven growth

=== Ecological civilization ===
One main avenue ecological Marxism dives into is the creation of an ecological civilization. This concept is being promoted in China and the CCP as a potential way to solve the climate crisis. Ecological civilization tries to clarify the true meaning of civilization without the structure of capitalism. Because ecological civilization does not have a set definition that is universally agreed upon, it has multiple interpretations of its meaning and the way it is implemented. This enables China and other nations to claim ecological civilization based on their own criteria, even if some scholars debate on the extent of their progression. China engages in certain aspects of neoliberalism, but they do not adhere completely to neoliberal economic policy. This puts China at odds with their projected image as a socialist country while raising questions about whether the Chinese government is genuine in promoting ecological civilization or just using the concept for national public relations purposes.

Though the term emerged first in the Soviet Union in 1984, it was in China under Pan Yue, the vice-minister of China's state environmental protection administration, that it was promoted within the CCP and Chinese society. The idea of ecological civilization has been embraced by the government, as central policy objective, but this has been more surface level support. Under Pan Yue, he promoted the idea of "green GDP", which takes into account environmental damage to show that economic growth is really false. However, the green GDP initiative faced backlash from local officials and business leaders, who were concerned that it would slow economic growth and expose environmental violations. Pan Yue's vision exposes the tension between China's environmental goals and economic realities. Failing to fully incorporate the green GDP metric shows the continuous preference for policies over environmental accountability. Although ecological civilization guides policy for China, green GDP initiatives still face resistance which shows how China still struggles to balance development and environmental protection without facing political and economic challenges. He goes on to further argue that to solve the global climate crisis, people need to be engaged and mobilized in public decision-making of how to solve it. Pan Yue believed the state is responsible in mobilizing its resources in fixing the climate crisis, with the public in control of the government to control the economy. Pan Yue was able to garner support with his use of Chinese traditional thought and history by "assert[ing] that Chinese tradition is eco-centric, endorsing ideas about an intrinsic harmony between humankind and nature." He uses this interpretation of Chinese tradition to contrast with the West, arguing, "Western tradition is essentially anthropocentric, placing humans in a dominant position vis-à-vis nature." By using traditional Chinese thought, particularly Confucianism, he claims that ecological civilization is in line with Chinese tradition that has been forgotten.

==== Ecological civilization in terms of China ====
Since 2007, ecological civilization has been incorporated into the CCP rhetoric, with Secretary General Jintao Hu's working report to the 17th National Congress naming ecological civilization as a main policy objective for the government. This would bleed into the 18th National Congress report by Secretary General Jintao Hu, where the implementation of an ecological civilization must be accelerated. This included reversing environmental pollution trends, more environmentally sustainable production systems, and ensuring global ecological security. To obtain the goals previously mentioned, implementation requires: revamping land-use patterns, promoting resource conservation, enhancing ecosystem protection, and supporting the growth of an eco-civilization system. Within five years, the CCP moved from language of support to policy objectives on how to implement ecological civilization. To the CCP, ecological civilization has become the logical next step in supporting the growth of socialism overall, while meeting the objectives of leading environmental reform in the world. For the Chinese government, "Eco-civilization emerged as a result of the political leadership's recognition of the magnitude of environmental and climate-related challenges that China is facing," and seeks to bring Chinese culture with socialism to address the problems of the climate crisis. Finally, while the Chinese government and intellectuals frame eco-civilization as a Chinese project, they also offer it as a solution for the rest of the world. Its focus on solving the climate crisis with continued economic growth, is appealing to any country that wishes to take the climate crisis seriously.

===== General Secretary Xi Jinping's relationship with ecological civilization =====
China has positioned itself as a global leader in climate governance, particularly through initiatives such as the Belt and Road Initiative's Green Development efforts. The nation's investments in renewable energy and diplomacy in United Nations climate summits have strengthened its influence in global environmental policy. Since becoming General Secretary in 2012, Xi Jinping has focused ecological civilization as a core policy direction, integrating environmental concerns into China's long-term developmental strategies. His place in office has promoted policies like the "ecological redline" system, which is used to set clear limits on environmental degradation. Despite this, critics reveal how economic priorities and industrial expansion can often complicate the reality of these initiatives.

To make this theory a real-life system, 5 reforms need to be taken as required by Xi Jinping. First, "an ecological cultural system to enhance the whole society's scientific and moral capability of ecological civilization under the guidance of ecological values." Secondly, the new economic system created should incorporate environmental assessment into the development of industrialization, forming the two into one being. Third, targets for ecological quality that sets a minimum of requirement. Fourth, the streamline of environmental law, legislation, and policy into one structure that complements the government. Fifth, a security of the environment that focuses on the prevention of disasters.

=== Eco-socialism in China ===
Ecological Marxism also spreads into the domain of ecological socialism, or eco-socialism, which seeks to be the antithesis to neoliberalism. Its critique of capitalism explores the way "capitalist production relationships influence or otherwise shape the productive forces (defined as land, energy, raw materials, technology, machinery, labor skills, work organization, and other means and objects of production and also as housing, transport, and other means and objects of reproduction or consumption). Eco-socialism takes traditional socialism and reforms it to include environmental issues, describing a utopian society of direct democracy, decentralization, communal ownership, and focus on the local stakeholder.

Research into eco-socialism in China started in 1980s and has evolved since around three main concepts: Marx and Engles conceptualization of nature-society relationships, Western eco-socialist interpretations, and the application of these theories to China's unique socio-political landscape. Ecological civilization in China has become the future utopia once industrial civilization has ended. Though it only can be thought of as the technical term for how to solve ecological problems with technological solutions, similar to the method the West has taken. Yet it can take a radical view that the centralization of the government by capitalism should be challenged by institutions that subordinate markets and empower individuals at the local level. Despite strict governmental control, environmental activism has grown in China, particularly through local protests against industrial pollution and urban expansion projects. Movements like the anti-incinerator protests in Guangdong and Zhejiang illustrate growing public engagement in ecological issues, albeit within state-imposed limits.

== Ecological Marxism in use ==
To address environmental issues within a theoretical framework, Ecological Marxism draws upon three major political ecologies: national environmental protection policy, the sustainable development strategy, and the scientific concept of development. These concepts serve as the basis for shaping China's approach to balancing economic growth with environmental sustainability, guiding the implementation of policies aimed at long-term ecological stability.

Zhou Enlai was a major influence on environmental protection in China; Chinese histories of environmentalism often describe Zhou as the "father" of environmental protection in China.

=== Environmental protection national policy 1978–1991 ===
In 1978, under the leadership of Deng Xiaoping, China underwent a significant shift in its political and economic focus. The country moved away from the emphasis on class struggle, which had dominated the preceding decades, and adopted a new agenda centered on economic modernization and development. This shift, known as the "Opening Up and Reform" period, marked the beginning of China's transition towards a market-oriented economy.

During this period, environmental protection began to gain more attention as part of China's broader development strategy. However, economic goals—such as industrialization, urbanization, and rapid economic growth—continued to take precedence over environmental concerns. As a result, while environmental issues were recognized, they were often sidelined or compromised in the face of the country's drive for economic modernization. The rapid industrial growth led to significant environmental challenges, including air and water pollution, deforestation, and the depletion of natural resources, issues that would later become central to China's environmental policy discussions.

Despite these challenges, the late 1970s and early 1980s saw the initial foundations being laid for environmental protection in China, including the establishment of environmental institutions like the State Environmental Protection Administration (SEPA) in 1988. Yet, during this time, environmental protection remained secondary to the broader priority of economic development.

=== Sustainable development strategy 1992–2001 ===
In the early 1990s, as China prepared to attend the United Nations Conference on Environment and Development (the Rio Summit) in 1992, the country began to embrace a more comprehensive approach to environmental protection. The Rio Summit, also known as the Earth Summit, was a landmark international conference where global leaders committed to addressing environmental issues through the adoption of sustainable development principles. In line with this global shift, China began to align its national policies with international environmental standards, leading to the creation of new laws and regulations designed to safeguard the environment.

To meet the expectations of international treaties, China introduced national policies aimed at improving environmental governance. Among these were laws such as the Environmental Protection Law (1989) and other sector-specific regulations. These legal frameworks were meant to facilitate China's integration into global environmental efforts, such as the Rio Declaration on Environment and Development, which emphasized the need for sustainable development that balanced economic growth with environmental preservation.

This period also marked the development of a new philosophy regarding China's economic development and environmental protection. The central idea was that economic growth and environmental protection were not mutually exclusive. Rather, it became increasingly clear that both could be achieved simultaneously if economic goals were framed in ways that considered environmental sustainability. This philosophy of green growth began to take root, emphasizing that economic development could be pursued through environmentally safe practices, such as energy efficiency, renewable resources, and eco-friendly technologies.

As a result, this strategy laid the groundwork for China's long-term commitment to sustainable development, marking a shift away from the earlier, more environmentally damaging model of industrialization.

=== Scientific concept of development/ecological Modernization, 2002 onwards ===
To ensure the Chinese economy remains competitive and experiences sustained long-term growth, it is essential for the country to implement a transformation focused on scientific development and environmental sustainability. This shift is necessary to address the ecological challenges posed by rapid industrialization and urbanization, which have led to environmental degradation. The foundation for this change lies in the concept of ecological civilization, introduced by Hu Jintao in his addresses to the National Congress in 2007 and 2012.

Ecological civilization calls for a departure from traditional growth models that prioritize economic expansion at the expense of the environment. Instead, it advocates for a balance between economic development and ecological health, recognizing that environmental damage undermines long-term prosperity. Hu's working papers emphasized that sustainable development must be the central focus, integrating energy efficiency, renewable resources, and eco-friendly technologies into China's industrial strategy.

This vision for green growth aligns with China's broader political goals, including improving public health and ensuring a sustainable future. It has influenced national environmental policies and guided China's approach to international climate agreements, positioning the country as a leader in global climate governance. By embracing ecological civilization, China seeks to secure both economic and environmental prosperity for future generations.

=== Forest conservation in the Greater Khingan Range, China ===
The Greater Khingan Range has become a key area for forest conservation under the Natural Forest Conservation Program, which seeks to lower commercial logging amounts along with illegal logging. In the article "Eco-socialism and the political ecology of forest conservation in the Greater Khingan Range, China" by Kevin Lo Liyuan Zhu, he explores the effects that state-owned enterprises have over forest conservation through the lens of eco-socialism. By looking at conservation practices through an eco-socialist or political ecology lens, a cost–benefit analysis for the environment and the political social dynamics of the area can be evaluated. While it successfully reduced deforestation rates, the program also had unintended social economic consequences which included job losses in communities that were dependent on logging. State owned enterprises (SOE) played a major role in implementing conservation policies, but the transition to sustainable forestry and eco-tourism faced economic and logistical challenges. Political ecology "seeks to reveal the politics at work in distributing, managing, and redistributing access to natural resources, political ecology has been influential in explaining socio-ecological crises—especially in the developing world," Because nature has become commoditized, looking at the ways the forest has become politicized by different actors explains how nature and the government can either become a positive or negative feedback loop. Political ecology helps explain this phenomenon, coining the term political forest, which expresses "the nature of the denaturalized forest and reveal how different groups of actors compete for access to and benefit from natural resources."

The forestry sector is heavily populated with SOE. With the passing of the Natural Forest Conservation Program (NFCP) in 1998, this slowly changed how this area could make a profit from the SOE's. The program wished to put small incremental regulations that would allow the SOE to continue but not add to any existing environmental problems or disasters. Environmental problems in rural areas are seen by the government as caused by rural backwardness, and the use of SOEs as needed to mitigate these inefficiencies. Prior to the NFCP, large scale deforestation in the Greater Khingan Range had significantly decreased China's boreal forests, leading to heightened flood risks and biodiversity losses. Government led conservation policies have now shifted from exploited logging practices to sustainable forest management, integrating local community participation and ecological compensation strategies. The SOEs can use land enclosure and resettlement policies to enact programs in sync with government policies. The local community has become resistant to the new changes due to their trickle-down effect. Studies see the change from traditional practices to the market-based conservation intervention as hazardous to the resident's culture with nominal environmental benefits. But local officials are found to have greater control over the projects even if they are directed by the central government and SOEs on the overarching theme.

These SOEs are relics of the Mao era but have gone through changes in principles and structure. SOEs are more in tune with the market, being government-affiliated organizations that are focused on profits. Though they are affiliated with the government, not all SOEs function the same regarding environmental protections and reformation. SOEs that are in resource-based industries located in remote areas can exhibit the most control over government management regarding environmental policy. With China's move towards environmental protection and the forestry, SOEs have been restructured to hit the targets that the central government has put forth. Because they are sponsored by the state, they are given more benefits by the government to stay in business even through the restructuring process. The four reorganization processes the Liyuan Zhu identifies are "(1) declining timber sales and increasing central subsidies; (2) restructuring of work-units; (3) creating redundancies; and (4) developing new sustainable economic activities."

With the SOE in the area being the main employer, those that have been dismissed faced large issues in being able to stay in the area and contribute. Those that were still employed by the Huzhong Forestry Bureau took a pay cut but were able to improve on work conditions overall. Those that lost their job joined other millions in becoming migrant workers, which continued their financial instability. Additionally, eco-restructuring of the company became negatively viewed.

==== Declining timber sales and increasing central subsidies ====
The SOE focused on the article is Huzhong Forestry Bureau (HFZB) which, under the new guidelines by the government regarding forestation, received subsidies for the loss of revenue and to carry over forest conservation. They received 1666.6 million yuan from the central government from 2011 to 2017. These subsidies ensured that the company remained financially stable, allowing them to maintain profitability despite declining timber sales.

==== Restructuring of work units ====
During China's transition towards more sustainable environmental policies, particularly in the late 20th century, significant restructuring took place within the country's work units, or "danwei," which were the basic organizational structures for employment and social services. Previously, work units were primarily focused on tasks related to logging, storage, management, delivery, and processing of timber and other forest products. These units played a central role in China's rapid industrialization and resource extraction.

However, as the environmental awareness grew and policies shifted towards ecological conservation, the focus of these work units was restructured. Workers who had been employed in the traditional industries of logging and timber processing were gradually transferred to new roles in teams that emphasized forest conservation and protection. Forest supervision teams were assigned the responsibility of managing and safeguarding forests, ensuring adherence to newly implemented conservation policies, and actively monitoring and preventing illegal logging activities.

Afforestation teams were dedicated to reforesting depleted areas by planting and cultivating new forests to restore ecological balance. Their work was essential in mitigating the adverse effects of deforestation, including soil erosion, desertification, and the decline of biodiversity, making afforestation a key priority in China's environmental strategy.

Social welfare and fire protection teams played a dual role in both ecological conservation and community well-being. They worked to enhance the living and working conditions of local forestry-dependent communities while implementing fire prevention measures and emergency response strategies to reduce the risk of wildfires in forested regions.

==== Redundancies ====
While the government provides subsidies to help with the restructuring of the company, this still affects the employment of workers. Many were laid off, starting with the contract workers, due to lack of job security protection. But with each new period of more stringent forest protection, job layoffs would follow. Contract workers originally had no compensation until 2008, when they received a one-off compensation of 341 yuan per service year compared to permanent workers that received 800 yuan per service year, with an additional 5000 yuan per person.

==== New economic activities ====
Since the company could no longer operate under its original purpose following the central government's adoption of new forestry laws, it shifted its focus toward eco-tourism and the cultivation of non-timber forest products. By developing eco-tourism, the company aimed to promote sustainable economic growth while preserving forest ecosystems. Additionally, the collection and planting of non-timber forest products became a key initiative, providing alternative sources of income for local communities while reducing reliance on traditional logging practices. This transition aligned with broader national efforts to balance economic development with environmental conservation.

=== 13th Five Year Plan 2016–2020 ===
One of the main policies is a national zoning plan to determine land use functions, with one of the subsidiaries of the ecological redline policy "whereby governments designate and enforce regulatory targets on ecosystem. This policy operates at a landscape level, that serves as a "lifeline" for maintain ecological integrity. Despite the ambitious scope of the ecological redline policy, its enforcement has faced significant barriers, including discrepancies in local governance, industrial resistance, and the economic dependencies of regions reliant on resource extraction. While national-level directives emphasize environmental conservation, local governments often prioritize economic growth, leading to uneven policy implementation. While China has over 10,000 protected areas that cover around 18% of the country, the ecological conservation redline areas will designate areas that are the bottom line of the area to keep them healthy and biodiverse. To ensure that the ecological conservation redlines are successful, reforms need to be made, including new legal mechanisms of protection, ecological assessments, conversation with local stakeholders, and performance targets with benchmarks and monitoring systems to determine the success of actions. At the moment, 15 provinces have created their ecological conservation redlines, accounting for about 25% of the total area of the provinces.

== See also ==
- Ministry of Ecology and Environment
- Environmental history of China
- Environmental policy in China
- Anti-incinerator movement in China
- Ecovillages in China
