= Bai Jingying =

Embroiderer from Inner Mongolia

- Born: 1963 (age 62–63)
- Occupation: Embroiderer
- Known for: Leading the development of women's embroidery training in Inner Mongolia
- Awards: National Poverty Alleviation Model Award

Bai Jingying (born 1963) is a Chinese embroiderer from Inner Mongolia. She teaches Wangfu embroidery, which she learned from her mother as a seven-year old and has historic significance for the region. The style was listed in 2009 as part of Inner Mongolia's intangible cultural heritage. Bai has established a scheme to train women to embroider and the finished pieces, such as slippers, are sold in cities and online. Since 2016, over 26,000 women have received training across Inner Mongolia, which has led to increased in income for 3000 women. The programme also targets women with disabilities providing them with a way to earn an income from home. This is important since Inner Mongolia has one of the lowest incomes in China, due to the impact of the climate crisis creating desertification and increasing the frequency of sandstorms, disturbing agriculture.

In 2021 Bai was one of ten people to receive the National Poverty Alleviation Model Award.
