= Zoigê Marsh =

Wetlands in Sichuan province, China

Coordinates: 33°42′N 102°38′E

Designations

Ramsar Wetland
- Official name: Sichuan Ruo'ergai Wetland National Nature Reserve
- Designated: 2 February 2008
- Reference no.: 1731

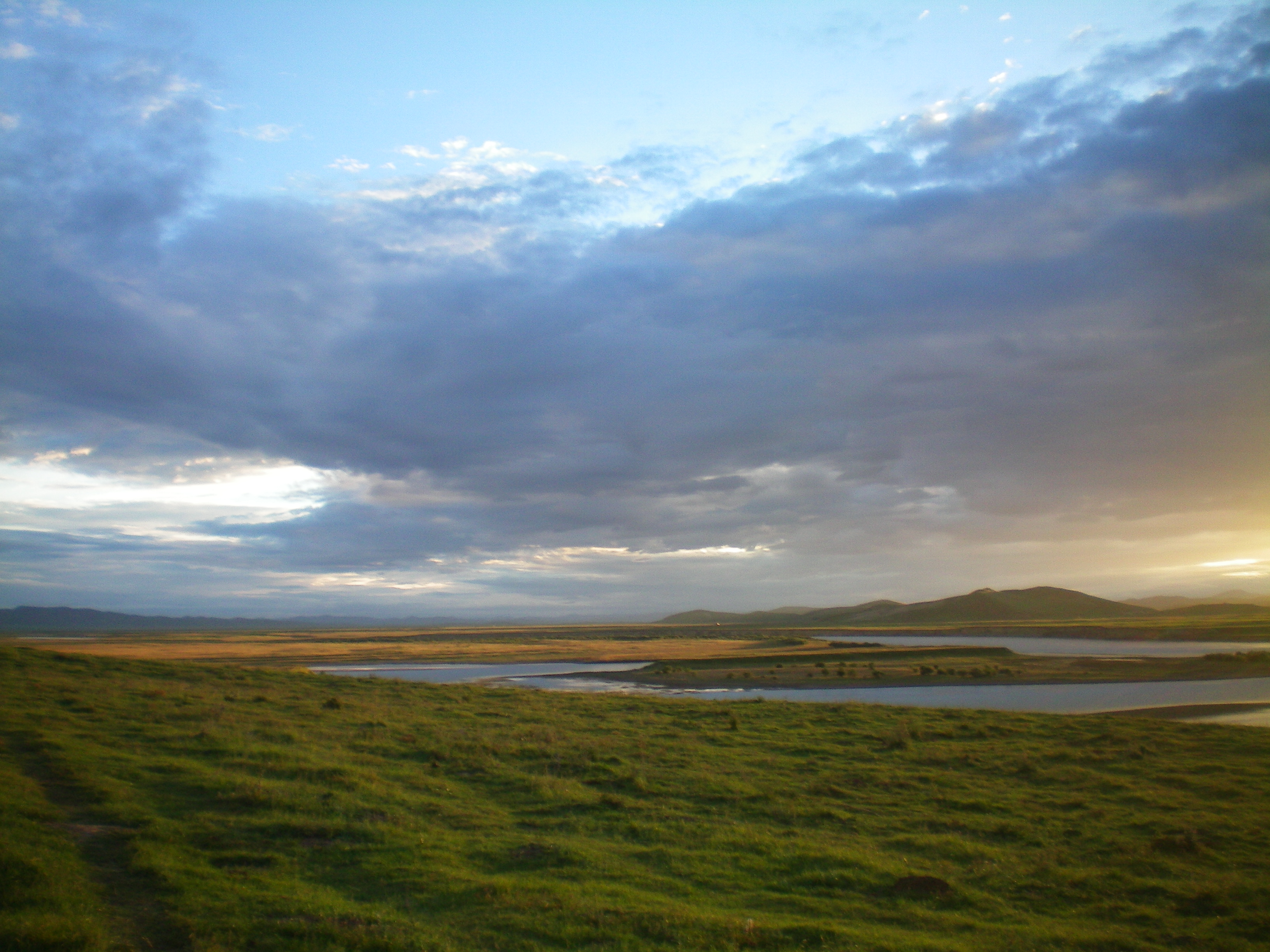
The peat bog landscape alongside the Yellow River

The Zoigê Marsh (Chinese: 若尔盖湿地; pinyin: Ruò'ěrgài Shīdì), also known as the Ruo'ergai Marsh or the Songpan Grasslands, is located in the eastern part of the Tibetan Plateau and forms the largest high-altitude marsh area in the world.

== Location ==
The marsh areas are mainly located in northern Sichuan Province, but extend into southern Gansu and southeastern Qinghai. The marshes are formed in a region of poor drainage that is located between the watersheds of the Yellow and Yangtze Rivers. The marshes are located at an altitude of about 3,600 meters above sea level and cover an area of about 2,600 square kilometers. To east, they are bordered by the Min Mountains and to the west by the Amne Machin mountain range.

== Geology ==
The marshes can be divided into four geomorphological regions: the Zoigê plateau plain, the Hong Yuan plateau mound, the A Ba plateau mountain, and the Songpan-Lixan Alp. The soil of the marshes contains a layer of peat that is about 2 to 3 meters thick in most places, but can reach up to 7 meters in thickness.The wetland is a low-level developed herbaceous swamp since the Quaternary Himalayan orogeny. It is also an important water conservation area in the upper reaches of the Yellow River, accounting for 29-45% of the water supply of the total upstream inflow.

== History ==
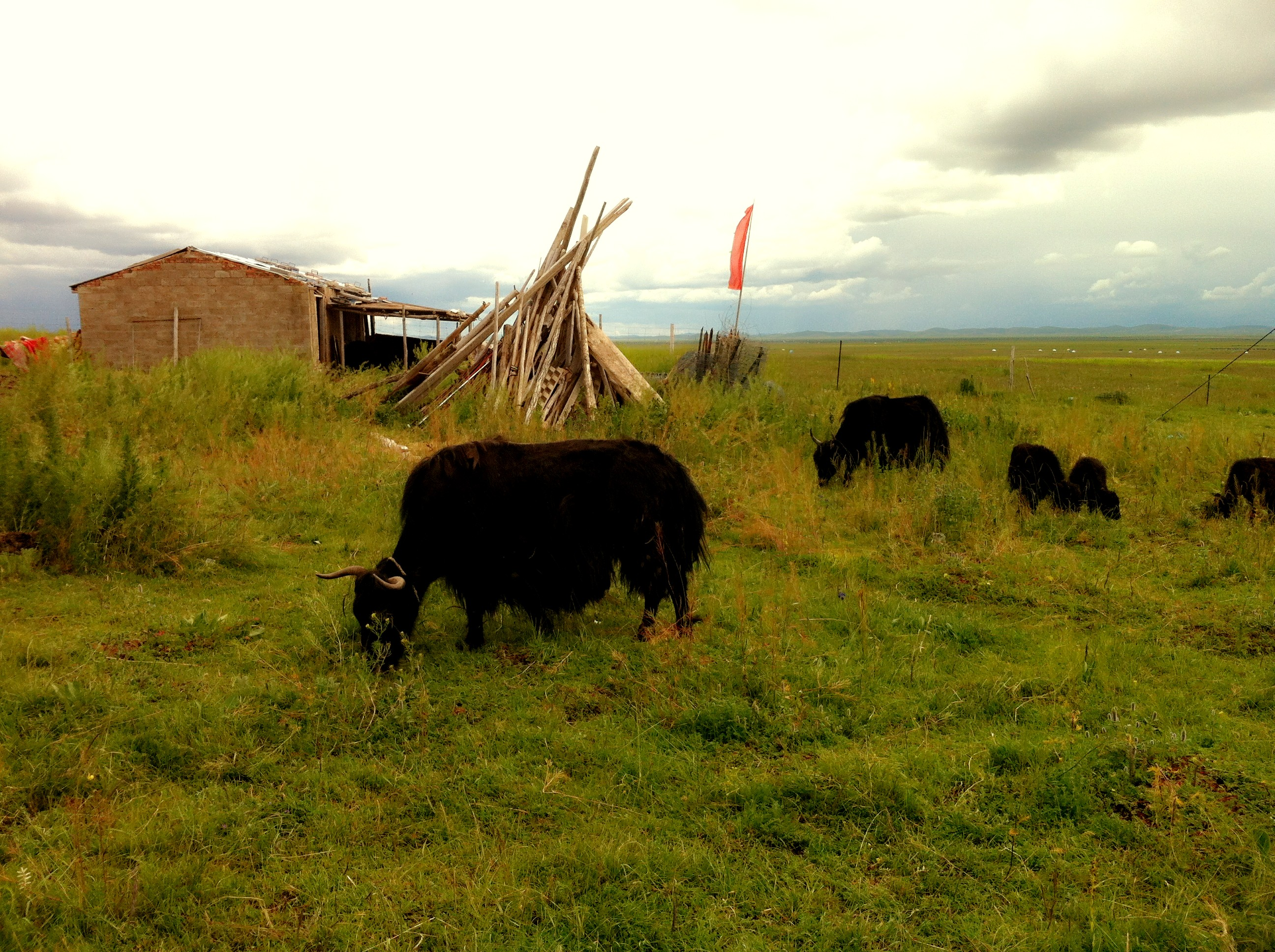
Yak graze on the Zoigê Grassland.

The Long March passed through the Zoigê Marsh in August 1935. The marshes were partially drained for grazing of cattle, sheep, and horses in the 1970s. This involved digging 200 km of ditches to drain 1,400 km^{2} of marshland. The project continued until the 1990s and exacerbated desertification problems. Herders reported that gold miners have also used cloud-seeding cannons to prevent rainfall, which has caused die-offs in vegetation.

In 1994, a nature preserve was established in the marshes. From 2010, community efforts to replant local grasses have been underway, with light grazing by yak allowed, so that the animals can tread the seeds down and stimulate regrowth.

On 10 November 2023, the National Forestry and Grassland Administration issued List of Important Habitats for Terrestrial Wildlife(first batch), with the Zoigê Marsh being listed as a major habitat of the black-necked crane.
