= Respiratory pressure meter =

Device used to measure respiration rate

A respiratory pressure meter measures the maximum inspiratory and expiratory pressures that a patient can generate at either the mouth (MIP and MEP) or inspiratory pressure a patient can generate through their nose via a sniff maneuver (SNIP). These measurements require patient cooperation and are known as volitional tests of respiratory muscle strength. Handheld devices displaying the measurement achieved in centimetres of water pressure (cmH_{2}O) and the pressure trace created, allow quick patient testing away from the traditional pulmonary laboratory and are useful for ward-based, out-patient and preoperative assessment, as well as for use by pulmonologists and physiotherapists.

The principal advantage of volitional tests is that they give an estimate of inspiratory or expiratory muscle strength, are simple to perform, and are well tolerated by patients.

== Causes of respiratory muscle impairment ==
Impairment of inspiratory and expiratory respiratory muscles is a common clinical finding, not only in patients with neuromuscular disease but also in patients with primary disease of the lung parenchyma or airways.

Patients with neuromuscular or metabolic diseases are at risk of developing skeletal and respiratory muscle weakness. In neuromuscular diseases close attention should be paid to the involvement of both the inspiratory and the expiratory muscles. In patients with multiple sclerosis for example, abdominal (and hence expiratory) muscle weakness is a hallmark of the disease, and is related to clinical problems such as mucus retention. In lung diseases, such as cystic fibrosis and COPD, inspiratory muscle weakness is often present. When patients are malnourished or exposed to corticosteroids, weakness of the respiratory muscles is also seen in these diseases.

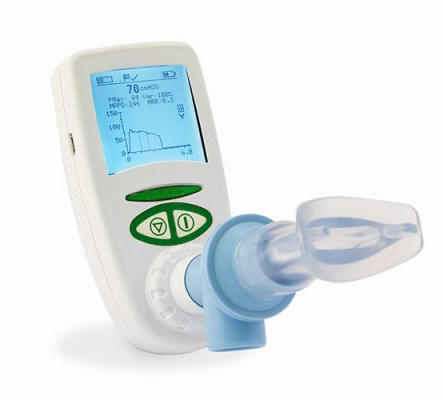
Respiratory pressure meter

Measuring respiratory muscle strength is a long-established method of assessing the mechanics of breathing. Respiratory muscle dysfunction (i.e., reduced strength or endurance) should be distinguished from lung function abnormalities and measured separately. Measurement of respiratory muscle function is important in the diagnosis of respiratory muscle disease or respiratory muscle dysfunction. It may also be helpful in the assessment of the impact of chronic diseases or their treatment on the respiratory muscles.

== Types of tests ==
=== Maximal inspiratory pressure (MIP), also called PImax ===
Maximal inspiratory pressure (MIP), also known as negative inspiratory force (NIF), is the maximum pressure that can be generated against an occluded (closed or obstructed) airway beginning at functional residual capacity (the volume of air present in the lungs at the end of passive expiration). It is a marker of respiratory muscle function and strength, represented by cmH_{2}O and measured with a manometer. MIP is an important and noninvasive index of diaphragm strength and an independent tool for diagnosing many illnesses. Typical MIPs in adult males can be estimated from the equation M_{IP} = 142 - (1.03 x Age) cmH_{2}O, where age is in years.

This test is performed at RV (Residual Volume), the amount of air remaining in the patient's lungs after fully exhaling. The patient then inhales as hard and as fast as possible with maximal sustained effort for longer than 1 second, and the pressure is the highest achieved during that time.

=== Maximal expiratory pressure (MEP), also called PEmax ===
This test is performed at TLC (total lung capacity). The patient inhales fully to prepare, and then exhales as hard and as fast as possible with maximal sustained effort for longer than 1 second. The exhaled pressure is the highest achieved during that time.

=== Sniff nasal inspiratory pressure (SNIP) ===
Sniff nasal inspiratory pressure (SNIP) refers to short, sharp voluntary inspiratory maneuver (inhalation) through one or both un-occluded (not closed or obstructed) nostrils. The tests are performed at FRC (functional residual capacity), at the end of tidal expiration. The measurement recorded is the peak pressure. This test is particularly suited to neuromuscular weakness because it doesn't require a mouthpiece and because it is easily mastered by the vast majority of patients.
