= Tan Kai =

Tan Kai (Chinese: 谭凯; born 1973) is a Chinese computer technician and an environmental activist from Zhejiang province. He operated his own company, called Lanyi Computer Repair, and co-founded an environmental advocacy and monitoring NGO called Green Watch (绿色观察). He was convicted in May 2006 for "illegally obtaining state secrets."

== Activism ==
Tan became interested in environmental issues following April 2005's violent struggles over pollution and corruption in the town of Huashui, Zhejiang, where many residents believe that releases of toxic substances from chemical plants into the water supply are destroying crops and causing birth defects. Further riots in Dongyang, in Xinchang (over a pharmaceutical factory), and at a battery factory in Changxin, convinced Tan to set up an environmental monitoring group, which he did informally in the summer of that year, together with five other individuals: Mr. Lai Jinbiao, Mr. Gao Haibing, Mr. Wu Yuanming, Mr. Qi Huimin, and Mr. Yang Jianming.

Because in order to operate lawfully as a local organization China requires a large staff, an office, and a large sum of money, in October 2005 Tan opened an account at a branch of Bank of China in Hangzhou with the sum of 500 yuan. When all six members of Green Watch were detained and released on October 19, Tan was charged and kept in custody. Although Tan was ostensibly arrested and charged with "illegally obtaining state secrets" after performing a routine backup on a computer belonging to a member of the Zhejiang Communist Party committee, Green Watch was declared illegal and banned one month later. Tan's friend and fellow activist Lai Jinbiao believes Tan was held because his name was the one on the bank account. On November 15, 2005, the Zhejiang provincial government declared Green Watch an illegal organization.

== Imprisonment ==
Tan was held incommunicado for nearly seven months until May 9, 2006. During this time, his father engaged two Beijing-based lawyers, Li Heping and Li Xiongbing, to defend Tan, but the Hangzhou Public Security Bureau denied permission to engage counsel because the case involved state secrets. The elder Tan persisted with another application, and Li was finally able to meet with Tan for one hour at the West Lake Detention Centre in Hangzhou.

== Trial ==
Although Tan pleaded innocent and no evidence of any crime was presented (the person from whom the secrets were supposedly taken did not appear), he was convicted in a three-hour trial at the Xihu District Court in Hangzhou, on the morning of May 15, 2006, which was closed to the public. He was sentenced to 18 months in prison for "illegally obtaining state secrets" by the Hangzhou Municipal People's Intermediate Court on August 11, 2006. His lawyer Li Heping raised concerns about Tan's health condition in prison, as he suffers from a liver disease.

== Release ==
Tan was released in 2007 following the serving of his full 18-month sentence.

== See also ==
- Environment of China
- Wu Lihong
