= Ministry of Environmental Protection =

Ministry of Environmental Protection may refer to:

- Ministry of Environmental Protection (Israel)
- Ministry of Environmental Protection (Serbia)
- Ministry of Environmental Protection of the People's Republic of China

== See also ==
- Ministry of Environmental Protection and Agriculture of Georgia
- Ministry of Environmental Protection and Energy (Croatia)
- List of environmental ministries
