= Anti-incinerator movement in China =

Environmental movement in China

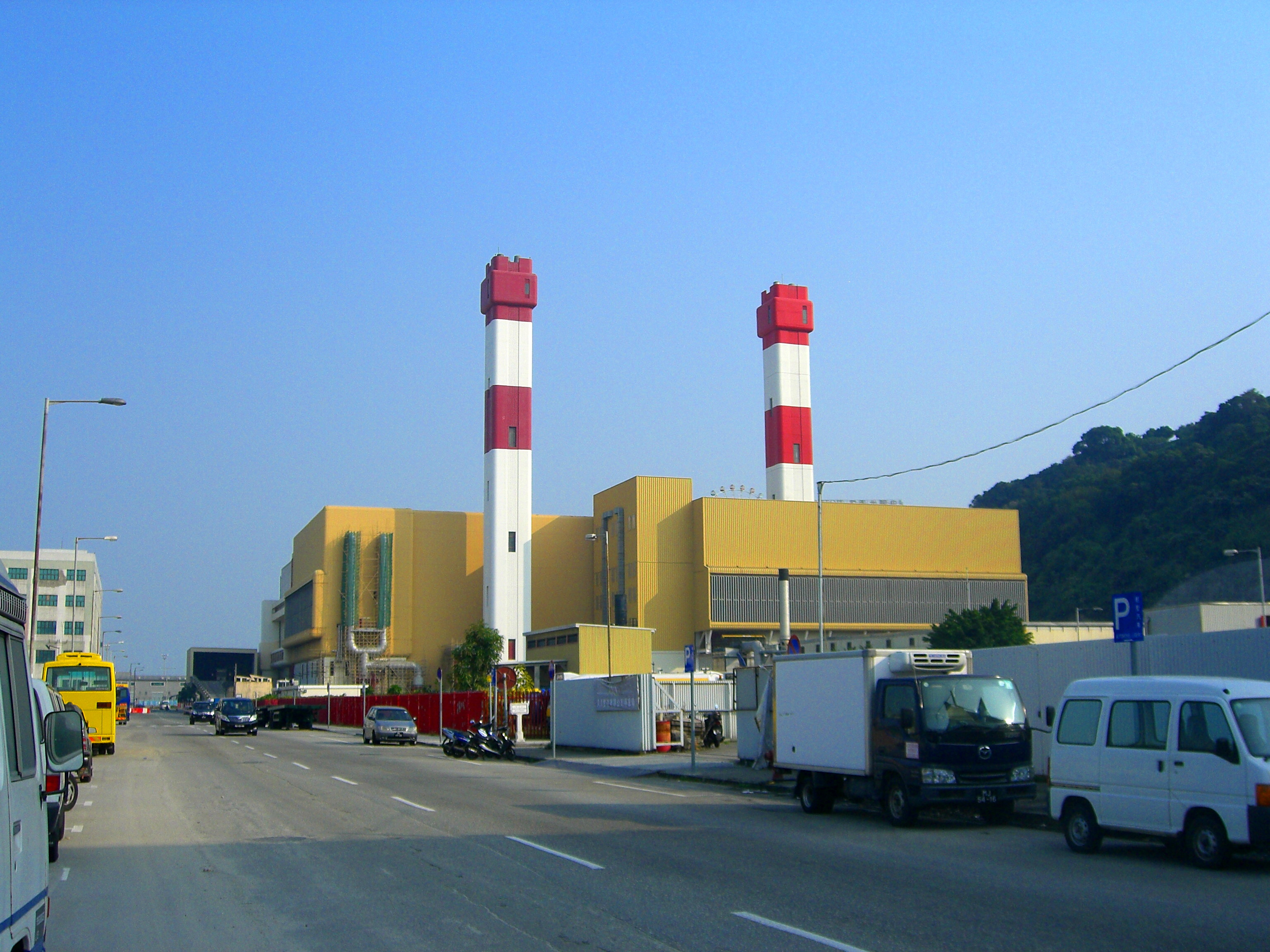
A waste incinerator in the Macao Special Administrative Region of the People's Republic of China

The anti-incinerator movement in China refers to the series of environmental protests that have occurred in opposition to China's numerous planned and operating industrial waste incinerators. The construction of these waste-to-energy facilities, which has prompted the ensuing protest movement, operates as part of China's ongoing efforts to restructure its waste disposal system in regard to its status as the largest producer of municipal solid waste worldwide since 2004. Described by some as being a new type of NIMBY protest, the roots of the anti-incinerator movement can be traced back to the early 1990s, following the introduction of China's first generation of incinerator plants. The movement, however, began in earnest with the benchmark 2006 Liulitun protest taking place in Beijing.

Since the success of the Liulitun plant protest, in which the proposed incinerator in Beijing's Haidian district was indefinitely postponed, numerous other instances of dissent surrounding China's incinerator plants have transpired, with particularly notable examples occurring in Guangzhou, Wujiang and Panguanying. While the individual protests have differed in terms of participants, tactics used and government response, each has been demonstrably oriented around environmental and health concerns emanating from the pollution and potential human cost associated with operating waste-to-energy incinerators.

Despite various successes occurring for protests of this type, China's national government has continued to acknowledge incineration as a viable solution for managing municipal waste, and as such, has continued to plan and develop numerous incinerator plants throughout the country.

== History ==
The first instances of dissent aimed at China's waste incinerators occurred as early as 1994, when the nation's first incinerator plant was implemented on the mainland. Since that time as many as 54 cases of incinerator-related disputes have been reported. The protests however did not begin achieving their current prominence and scope until the Liulitun protest in Beijing, which began in 2006 and extended into early 2011, ending with the ultimate cancellation of the incinerator project at its original location.

From these events in Beijing's Haidian district stemmed a series of other like-minded protests, led by individuals who had become empowered by the success of the protest in China's capital. Amongst these were protests in Guangzhou, Wujiang and Panguanying, all of which began during or around the time of 2009. In Guangzhou inhabitants of the residential Panyu district began opposing plans to construct a municipal waste incinerator in their area after coming across a posting on a government website. Eventually, by the end of 2011, protesters were able to get the project cancelled at its proposed site, with the government electing to move the plant elsewhere.

Similarly, in Pingwang, a town located outside Wujiang city in China's Jiangsu province, residents began opposing the construction of a nearby incinerator plant that was already nearing completion. Their collective efforts, which culminated in a large-scale peaceful demonstration occurring in late 2009, resulted in the plant's construction being halted pending further review. In the same year, in Panguanying, a small rural village in China's Hebei province, villagers utilized assistance from environmental NGOs and urban activists from Beijing to repeatedly halt the project, leading to the proposed plant being shelved after negotiations broke down.

In recent years, as China has continued to develop new waste incinerators, protests have occurred in such places as Lubo town, Zhaoqing city and Sihui city, all in China's Guangdong province. In 2017 there was another notable protest in the south-eastern city of Shenzhen opposing the development of the city's Shenzhen East Waste-to-Energy Plant, which would become one of the largest waste incinerators nationwide upon completion.

== Key issues and participants ==
In each anti-incinerator protest, despite the variety of individuals involved, the common goal of protesters has consistently been the prevention or postponement of a planned or operational incinerator facility in their area. Moreover, given their localized nature, each protest has been mainly directed at the local government, though those that were able to transcend local bounds, through media coverage and intervention from activist groups, have been shown to adopt a broader context.

In the 2006 Beijing Liulitun protest, participants were largely made up of scholars and science or engineering professionals from nearby universities and businesses who resided the Haidian district. Given the academic backgrounds of these individuals and their prior objection of a noxious landfill already present in the area, the ensuing anti-incinerator protest was particularly conscious of the potential health risks associated with waste incineration. As research suggested to the protesters, incinerator plants, especially those from earlier generations, produce a variety of noxious byproducts containing dioxins, such as fly ash. Production of such harmful chemicals and concerns over how nearby communities would be affected has become the defining issue of the anti-incinerator movement.

During the Panyu protest in Guangzhou, participants consisted of long-time residents as well as recent migrants to the newly developed district, a majority of whom were unaware or felt they were not properly informed of the plans to construct an incinerator. As with the Liulitun protest, protesters in Panyu showed concern for their health as well the potential environmental impact of the proposed plant if it were constructed. As such, their demands ranged from a more accessible environmental impact assessment (EIA) to having the project be canceled outright. Like in Beijing, protesters were uniquely assisted by the occupations of professionals residing in the area, many of whom, in this case, were journalists, members of the local media and retired government bureaucrats.

In the protest of an incinerator plant being built in the town of Pingwang, which is located near the city of Wujiang, a majority of protesters were local residents. Being inspired by the successful Liulitun protest in Beijing, protesters aimed to prevent the completion of their own nearby plant, citing amongst their concerns the proven detrimental effects of waste incinerators.

Unlike previous protests of its kind, the 2009 Panguanying protest, which took place China's Hebei Province, exhibited participation which extended significantly beyond the local sphere. While initially only consisting of residents of the rural Panguanying village, protesters eventually garnered the support of urban environmental activists and legal professionals from Beijing. Participants in the Panguanying protest shared the environmental and health-related motivations of other similar demonstrations, however, they also aimed to expose the malpractice and deceit inherent in the planning and flawed environmental impact assessment of their town's incinerator plant.

Throughout the reported protests, various environmentalist groups have gotten involved and supported protesters including the Beijing-based Nature University, Friends of Nature and the Guangzhou-based Eco Canton, the creation of which stemmed directly from the Panyu protest.

== Protest strategy and tactics ==
Tactics employed during anti-incinerator protests have included appealing to local officials, communicating over online services, conducting public demonstrations and utilizing media attention. Another shared factor of many of these protests has been their recognition and, in some cases, direct consultation or imitating of their predecessors.

During the Liulitun protest in Beijing, protesters, in emphasis of their concerns regarding the harmful health effects of waste incineration, drew up signs and T-shirts with phrases referencing the potential human cost of incinerators and assembled on World Environment Day, June 5, 2007, to express their objection. Protesters also sought legal help from environmental lawyers and produced a lengthy report articulating their opposition to the project, actions which were later emulated by protesters in Panguanying.

In Guangzhou, during the Panyu district protest, residents began by exploring the ramifications of municipal waste incinerators by conducting online research and visiting a nearby incinerator plant for reference. Protesters also visited the nearby village of Likeng where villagers had been conducting protests against their own incinerator since 2000, and thus had first-hand experience living close to a waste-to-energy plant. Eventually concluding that the proposed plant would be detrimental to their community, protesters in Panyu began writing letters to government officials and later took to the streets to publicly express their concerns. On October 25, 2009, in one such case, protesters marched near a supermarket wearing surgical and gas masks and carrying signs depicting various anti-incinerator messages. These actions eventually resulted in the police being called in and some arrests being made. A month later, following the government's announcement of a public reception to discuss community issues, protesters mobilized via online blogs and social media sites and arrived at the event in such numbers that the venue was incapable of accommodating everyone present.

Protesters in Pingwang similarly utilized the internet and various online bulletin boards to criticize their town's incinerator plant and mobilize protests against it. When online methods proved ineffective thousands residents took to the streets during October 2009 and occupied the planned incinerator facility for 2 days, leading to police being brought out and the protest being peacefully dispersed.

In the village of Panguanying protesters began by making a series of appeals to local government officials. When their concerns were rebuffed protesters began visiting other nearby villages to ask for their support, and, using the Liulitun protest as reference, produced their own report articulating their discontent for the development of an incinerator. Eventually a group of protesters traveled to Beijing and sought the help of prominent environmental lawyers who in turn connected them with various environmental activist groups and assisted in having their case be heard in the Qiaoxi District People's Court.

In cases such as Panguanying the role of media proved significant in bringing wider attention to the innately localized issue of the town's incinerator plant. Moreover, through connecting with the environmental NGO, Nature University, in Beijing, villagers were able to receive necessary educational and planning support.

In more recent years protesters have utilized modern communications and social media services such as Twitter and WeChat to organize their efforts and share information.

== Government response ==
Given the marked success of protests in places such as Beijing and Guangzhou, it can be observed that the government has been notably responsive to the anti-incinerator movement. While in many cases police were dispatched to break up any public demonstrations, local governments have ultimately acknowledged protesters’ concerns and, in some cases, made such accommodations as canceling proposed incinerator projects or agreeing to relocate construction to less-populated areas. This can especially be seen in the case of Pingwang town, where the mass-mobilization of protesters forced the government to re-evaluate their initial dismissal of the residents' concerns. In cases such as the Panguanying protest, the local government responded first by assuring residents that pollution levels would not increase as a result of the proposed plant, though when protesters remained unswayed officials eventually relented and postponed the project.

=== Future developments ===
Despite various concessions having been made with regard to anti-incinerator protests, the Chinese government has maintained its commitment to waste-to-energy incinerators as a means to lessen the nation's ongoing waste burden. Following the cancellation of the Panyu plant in Guangzhou, the government, in a press conference during April 2012, affirmed its plans to build 4 new incinerators throughout the city to deal with growing amounts of municipal waste. Similarly, in Beijing, despite the success of the Liulitun protest, various incinerator plants have since been constructed, including the original Liulitun plant which was, in 2010, relocated to the nearby village of Dagong. Additionally, the national government has continued to implement various policies and initiatives to support incineration. Presently the number of waste incinerators operating in China has reached nearly 300 with 249 being in cities and 50 near small towns. Accordingly, there are plans to increase this number to meet the state sponsored goal of having nearly one third of the nation's garbage disposed of via incineration by 2030.
