= Ma Jun (environmentalist) =

Chinese environmentalist, environmental consultant, and journalist

- 马军
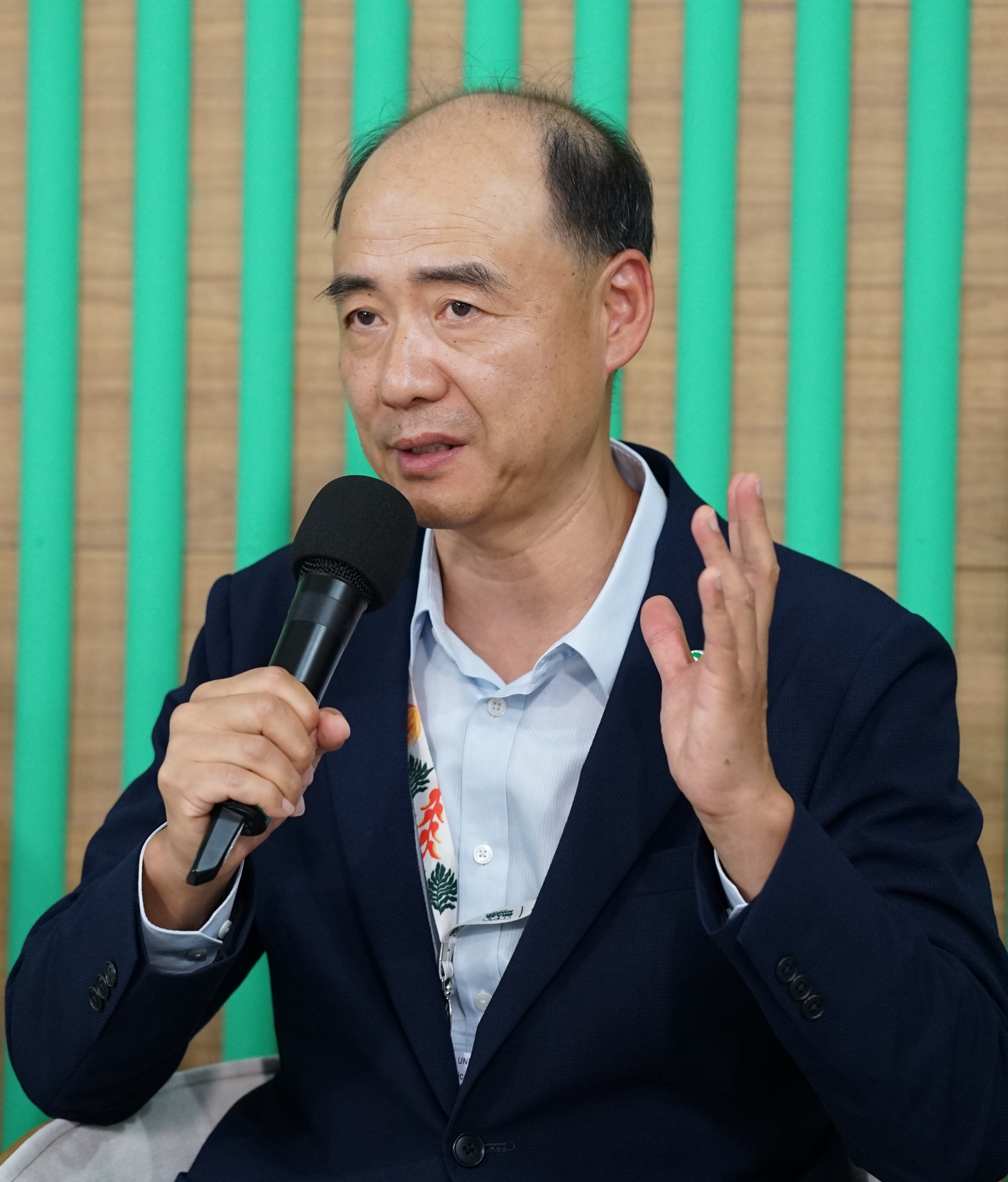
- Ma at COP30 in 2025
- Born: 22 May 1968 (age 58); Qingdao, Shandong, China

Ma Jun (simplified Chinese: 马军; traditional Chinese: 馬軍; pinyin: Mǎ Jūn; born 22 May 1968) is a Chinese environmentalist, environmental consultant, and journalist. He is the director of the Institute of Public & Environmental Affairs (IPE).

== Biography ==
In the 1990s Ma became known as an investigative journalist, working at the South China Morning Post from 1993 to 2000. There, he began to specialize in articles on environmental subjects. He eventually became the Chief Representative of SCMP.com in Beijing.

Ma's 1999 book China's Water Crisis (Zhongguo shui weiji) has been compared to Rachel Carson's Silent Spring – China's first major book on the subject of that nation's environmental crisis.

He directs the IPE (Institute of Public and Environmental Affairs), which developed the China Water Pollution Map (中国水污染地图), the first public database of water pollution information in China. He also serves as environmental consultant for the Sinosphere Corporation.

Ma said: "Water pollution is the most serious environmental issue facing China. It has a huge impact on people's health and economic development. That is why we have begun to build this database. To protect water resources, we need to encourage public participation and strengthen law enforcement. In some places, polluting factories and companies are being protected by local governments and officials."

In 2010, Ma, addressing air pollution particularly in the wake of efforts made at the time of the Beijing Olympics, said "many of the government's efforts to curtail pollution had been offset by the number of construction projects that spit dust into the air and the surge in private car ownership."

In 2016, Ma Jun appeared in the National Geographic film, Before the Flood, directed by Fisher Stevens and narrated by Leonardo DiCaprio.

== Recognition ==
He was named as one of the 100 most influential people in the world by Time magazine in May 2006, in an article written by Hollywood film star Ed Norton. He was awarded the Ramon Magsaysay Award in 2009. In 2012, Ma received the Goldman Environmental Prize. In 2015, Ma Jun became the first Chinese social entrepreneur to win the Skoll Award. In 2021, Jun was selected as a Bloomberg New Economy Catalyst.

== Selected publications ==
Books

- China's Water Crisis (中国水危机; 2004)

Articles

Ma Jun has written for the online journal chinadialogue since 2006. Articles are available in Chinese and English.

- "Tackling China's water crisis online" (21 September 2006)
- "A path to environmental harmony" (30 November 2006)
- "How participation can help China's ailing environment" (31 January 2007)
- Jun, Ma (9 May 2007). "The environment needs freedom of information". Chinadialogue.net.
- "Getting involved" (24 May 2007)
- "Disaster in Taihu Lake" (8 June 2007)
- "After green GDP, what next?" (8 August 2007)
- "Tackling pollution at its source" (14 August 2007)
- "Ecological civilisation is the way forward" (31 October 2007)
- "Your right to know: a historic moment" (1 May 2008)

Ma Jun wrote for Hong Kong's South China Morning Post from 1993 to 2000.

- Green Choice Apparel Supply Chain Investigation - Draft Report (PDF, 41 p., April 9., 2012)

== See also ==
- China Pollution Map Database
- Environment of China
- Ministry of Environmental Protection of the People's Republic of China
- Scientific publishing in China
