= Pollution in China =

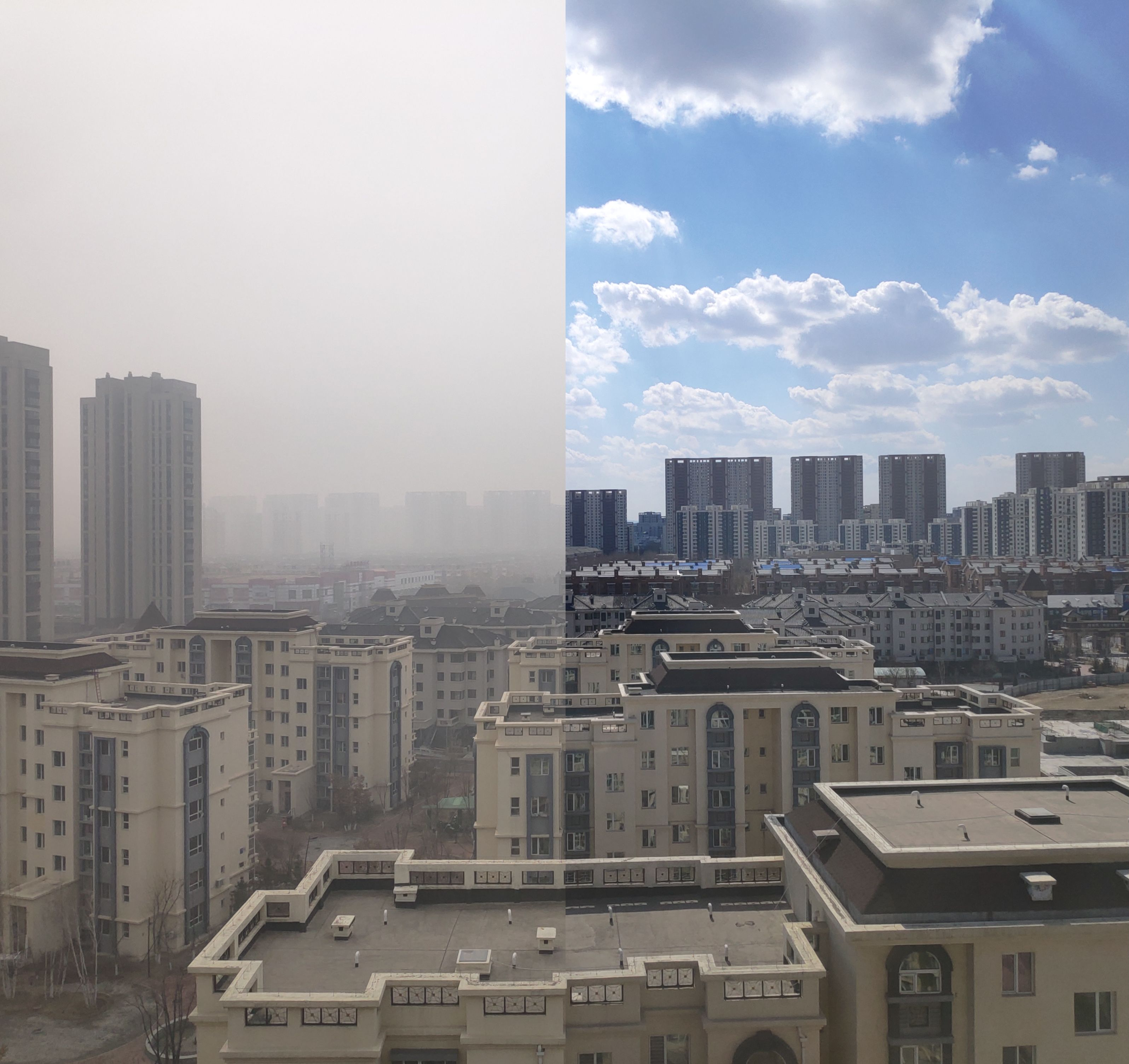
Comparison of haze and sunny days in Liaoning, China. The two images were taken 10 days apart.

Pollution in China is one aspect of the broader topic of environmental issues in China. Various forms of pollution have increased following the industrialisation of China, causing widespread environmental and health problems.

== Pollution statistics ==
=== Soil ===
The immense population and industrial growth in the People's Republic of China since the 1980s has resulted in increased soil pollution. The State Environmental Protection Administration believes it to be a threat to the environment, food safety and sustainable agriculture. 38,610 square miles (100,000 km^{2}) of China's cultivated land have been polluted, with contaminated water being used to irrigate further 31.5 million acres (21,670 km^{2}.), and another 2 million acres (1,300 km^{2}) have been covered or destroyed by solid waste. In 2014, following a longtime refusal to release accurate data regarding soil pollution, the Chinese government issued a report which revealed that an estimated 16.1% of soils in the country, and 19.4% of agricultural soils specifically, were contaminated with heavy metals, chemicals, and organic waste. Chinese officials have stated that a mass of land, estimated to be the size of Taiwan in total, is so severely polluted that agriculture should be banned there. An estimated 6 million tonnes of food grain are contaminated by heavy metals every year, causing direct losses of 29 billion yuan (US$2.57 billion).

Much of China's soil contamination problem relates to heavy metals. Cadmium has been shown to be the most common heavy metal pollutant in China's soil, followed by nickel, arsenic, copper, mercury, lead, chromium, and zinc, many of which are found in high concentrations in and around cities. Heavy metal pollution in China's soils is often caused by the mining industry. Increased mining in recent decades has resulted in a large buildup of tailings and waste materials, which leach heavy metals and other toxins into surrounding agricultural soils, affecting the quality of the produce. This is a particular problem on the Liaodong Peninsula, which is rich in mineral deposits (and thus it has an intense mining industry), and also the Tianjin-Henan-Shendong corridor in northeast China. Soil in areas near smelting plants have also shown elevated levels of heavy metals. The presence of heavy metals in the contaminated soil have adverse health effects on human metabolism. Ingestion, contact through the skin, diet through the soil-food chain, respiratory intake, and oral intake can deliver toxic substances to humans. High sulfates, nitrates, and other inorganic contaminants are also a problem in China's soils and, thus, food, due to widespread pesticide and chemical fertilizer use, which can also negatively impact consumers. The presence of untreated (or partially-treated) sewage in rivers used to irrigate crops also contributes to long-term buildup of heavy metals and other toxins in the soil.

=== Waste ===
As China's waste production increases, insufficient efforts to develop capable recycling systems have been attributed to a lack of environmental awareness. In 2012, the waste generation in China was 300 million tons (229.4 kg/cap/yr).

A ban came into effect on 15 June 2008 that prohibited all supermarkets, department stores and shops throughout China from giving out free plastic bags, therefore encouraging people to use cloth bags. Stores must clearly mark the price of plastic shopping bags and are banned from adding that price onto the price of products. The production, sale and use of ultra-thin plastic bags—those less than 0.025 millimeters (0.00098 in) thick—are also banned. The State Council called for "a return to cloth bags and shopping baskets." This ban, however, does not affect the widespread use of paper shopping bags at clothing stores or the use of plastic bags at restaurants for takeout food. A survey by the International Food Packaging Association found that in the year after the ban was implemented, 10 percent fewer plastic bags found their way into the garbage.

A particularly significant source of waste is the agricultural sector. In fact, Chinese farms generate more pollution than factories, according to a large survey by the government. Pesticides and fertilizer residues, packaging associated, bags and mulch film are largely left untreated in landfills, often due to a lack of waste management infrastructure.

==== "White pollution" ====
The term "white pollution" (Chinese: 白色污染; pinyin: báisè wūrǎn, less often "white garbage" Chinese: 白色垃圾; pinyin: báisè lājī) appears local to China and later South Asia, far less used and recognized outside of the region. It refers to the white plastic shopping bags, Styrofoam containers, and other light-colored materials that began turning up in visible volume in agricultural fields, the landscape, and waterways in the mid-to-late 1990s. The first references to the term "white pollution" appeared in official language at least as early as 1999 when the first bans were imposed by the State Council.

==== Electronic waste ====
In 2024, China produced 12.1 million tons of electronic waste. The annual amount is expected to increase as the Chinese economy grows. In addition to domestic waste production, large amounts of electronic waste are imported from overseas. Legislation has banned the importation of electronic waste. Requiring proper disposal of domestic waste has recently been introduced but has been criticized as insufficient and susceptible to fraud. There have been local successes, such as in the city of Tianjin, where 38,000 tons of electronic waste were disposed of properly in 2010, though much electronic waste is still improperly handled.

=== Industrial pollution ===
Air pollution caused by industrial plants

In a 1997 report targeting China's policy towards industrial pollution, the World Bank stated that "hundreds of thousands of premature deaths and incidents of serious respiratory illness have been caused by exposure to industrial air pollution". Since the Industrial Revolution, air pollution has been a major source of worry for human growth. Using an original survey in China, a first causal estimate of pollution's impact on political opinions was given. The survey further stated that dueorms have had some effect. It was determined that continued environmental reforms were likely to have a large effect on reducing industrial pollution.

In its 2007 article about China's pollution problem, The New York Times stated that "Environmental degradation is now so severe, with such stark domestic and international repercussions, that pollution poses not only a major long-term burden on the Chinese public but also an acute political challenge to the ruling Communist Party." The article's main points included:

1. According to the Chinese Ministry of Health, industrial pollution has made cancer China's leading cause of death.
2. Every year, ambient air pollution alone kills hundreds of thousands of citizens.
3. 500 million people in China are without safe and clean drinking water.
4. Only 1% of the country's 560 million "city people" breathe air considered safe by the European Union, because all of its major cities are constantly covered in a "toxic gray shroud". Before and during the 2008 Summer Olympics, Beijing was "frantically searching for a magic formula, a meteorological deus ex machina, to clear its skies for the 2008 Olympics."
5. Lead poisoning or other types of local pollution continue to kill many children.
6. A large section of the ocean is without marine life because of massive algal blooms caused by the high nutrients in the water.
7. The pollution has spread internationally: sulfur dioxide and nitrogen oxides fall as acid rain on Seoul, South Korea, and Tokyo; and according to the Journal of Geophysical Research, the pollution even reaches Los Angeles in the US.
8. The Chinese Academy of Environmental Planning in 2003 produced an unpublished internal report which estimated that 300,000 people die each year from ambient air pollution, mostly of heart disease and lung cancer.
9. Chinese environmental experts in 2005 issued another report, estimating that annual premature deaths attributable to outdoor air pollution were likely to reach 380,000 in 2010 and 550,000 in 2020.
10. A 2007 World Bank report conducted with China's national environmental agency found that "[...] outdoor air pollution was already causing 350,000 to 400,000 premature deaths a year. Indoor pollution contributed to the deaths of an additional 300,000 people, while 60,000 died from diarrhea, bladder and stomach cancer and other diseases that can be caused by water-borne pollution." World Bank officials said that "China's environmental agency insisted that the health statistics be removed from the published version of the report, citing the possible impact on 'social stability'".

A draft of a 2007 combined World Bank and SEPA report stated that up to 760,000 people die prematurely each year in China due to air and water pollution. High levels of air pollution in China's cities cause 350,000–400,000 premature deaths. Another 300,000 die because of poor-quality indoor air. There are an additional 60,000 premature deaths each year because of poor water quality. Chinese officials asked that some of the results should not be published in order to avoid social unrest.

China has made some improvements in environmental protection in recent years. According to the World Bank, 'China is one of a few countries in the world that have been rapidly increasing their forest cover. It is managing to reduce air and water pollution.

Vennemo et al., in a 2009 literature review in Review of Environmental Economics and Policy, noted the wide discrepancy between the reassuring view presented in some Chinese official publications and the exclusively negative view in some Western sources. The review stated that "although China is starting from a point of grave pollution, it is setting priorities and making progress that resemble what occurred in industrialized countries during their earlier stages of development." Environmental trends were described as uneven. The quality of surface water in the south of China was improving and particle emissions were stable. However, NO_{2} emissions were increasing rapidly, and SO_{2} emissions had been increasing before decreasing in 2007, the last year for which data was available.

Conventional approaches to air quality monitoring in China are based on networks of static and sparse measurement stations. However, there are drivers behind current rises in the use of low-cost sensors for air pollution management in cities.

The immense urban growth of Chinese cities has substantially increased the need for consumer goods, vehicles and energy. This in turn increases the burning of fossil fuels, resulting in smog. Exposure to Smog poses a threat to the health of Chinese citizens. A study from 2012 showed fine particles in the air, which cause respiratory and cardiovascular diseases were one of the key pollutants that accounted for a large fraction of damage on the health of Chinese citizens.

=== Water pollution ===
The water resources of China are affected by both severe water shortages and severe water pollution. The rapid population increase and rapid economic growth, as well as lax environmental oversight, resulted in increased water demand and pollution. China has 20% of the world's population, but only 6-8% of its water, with most of northern China being arid, and much of southeastern China being a wetter climate. As nearly half of China's population lives in the northern part of the country, which only has up to 14% of the country's water resources, this has led to major challenges. The Chinese government has launched projects to combat this issue, including the South-North Water Transfer Project, a major aqueduct system which cost an excess of 500 billion yuan ($70 billion USD).

The lack of water in the northeastern regions, which are also home to 60% of cultivated lands due to the prevalence of river floodplains, has led to water recycling, which means that millions of farmers end up using raw or partially-treated sewage and industrial effluents to irrigate their crops. While sewage can provide many beneficial nutrients for plants, it and the industrial products used in recycled irrigation water also lead to widespread heavy metal, pathogen, and chemical contamination of food and soil.

It was estimated in a 2018 article that up to 90% of domestic sewage and around 30% of industrial waste was dumped untreated into rivers and lakes in China as well as the ocean due to lack of waste treatment facilities. Not only that, but extensive farming and husbandry also accounts for significant amounts of pollution due to the majority of farmers ignoring waste disposal regulations put in place by the Chinese government. In March 2013 for example, over 16,000 dead pigs floated down the Huangpu River into Shanghai, which had been illegally dumped upstream in Jiaxing by farmers. This caused temporary contamination of Shanghai's drinking water, as well as the need for a local cleanup operation and much public unease. Even though the government had previously slashed the amount of land in Jiaxing available for farming, the number of pigs in the region continued to increase, leading to overcrowding and disease. After a government investigation, it was said that high costs of proper burial or cremation incentivized the farmers to simply dump the dead animals into the river.

Three-quarters of China's rivers and lakes are so polluted that they are seen as unfit for fishing and drinking. The Yangtze River alone receives billions of tons of wastewater annually from the cities along its course. This has led to widespread pollution of surface water resources, particularly in the lower reaches of the river watershed, and the Yangtze has been found to be the largest contributor to ocean plastic pollution out of all the world's rivers. The Hai River basin, which runs through the Northeast China Plain through Hebei and Tianjin, has been estimated to be the most polluted river basin in the country. Its flow rate has significantly been reduced due to diversions for agriculture and industry, and more than half of the remaining surface water is too contaminated to drink. The Yellow River, like the Yangtze, has seen similar pollution problems from unregulated dumping, as well as drying up completely at times due to overuse.

Industrial failure has also led to contamination of China's surface water. In 2005, an explosion at the Jilin Petrochemical Plant in Jilin Province led to 100 tons of toxic chemicals, mainly benzene and nitrobenzene, being poured into the Songhua River. The contaminants traveled downstream, shutting off drinking water supply to the city of Harbin for 5 days until the chemicals reduced enough to match government standards. In 2014, a Lanzhou Petrochemical Company factory leaked benzene into the Yellow River and groundwater from a broken pipeline, contaminating Lanzhou's only source of drinking water and leaving the residents without any running water for 2 days. Lanzhou Petrochemical Company paid 100 million yuan ($16 million USD) to the government of Lanzhou to make up for the damage.

Lakes in China have also seen high levels of pollution. Chao Lake, the 13th largest lake in China, became known as one of the world's most polluted lakes due to excessive sewage and agricultural discharge, which resulted in extreme eutrophication. Following intensive cleanup efforts by the Chinese government beginning in 2011, the lake's situation has seen some improvements. Lake Tai, the third-largest freshwater lake in China, has also been severely polluted by decades of industry and sewage dumping, which has caused major algal blooms and fish die-offs, and which has forced the millions of nearby residents to find other sources of drinking water. This lake became known as a "sewage sink" in 2007 after a widespread blue-green algae bloom. The government has spent billions of dollars dredging the lake and adding new sewer lines to properly treat household waste, which had improved the lake from Stage V ("Worst quality") to Stage III ("Fairly good") in China's water quality rating system by 2025.

Microplastics, from both domestic and industrial waste, are also a major problem, with widespread contamination of rivers, lakes, the Yellow Sea, and the South China Sea being observed. Many animal species in Chinese rivers and lakes, including the Baiji (Yangtze River Dolphin), have been driven to extinction due in large part to water pollution.

In 1980, the entire country has 440 billion cubic meters of total water consumption. Consumption by agriculture, forestry, husbandry, and country residents was about 88 percent of the total consumption. However, an investigation shows that 19 percent of water in main rivers has been polluted with a total length of 95,000 kilometers. In addition, a survey of 878 rivers in the early 1980s shows that 80 percent of them were polluted to some extent and that fish became extinct in more than 5 percent of the total river length throughout the country. Furthermore, there are over 20 waterways unsuitable for agricultural irrigation due to water pollution. In response, China has taken measures such as rapidly building out the water infrastructure and increased regulation as well as exploring a number of further technological solutions.

China's aquifers are also under major threat from pollution. It is estimated that 80-90% of China's groundwater is unsuitable for drinking without treatment, with 50% being too polluted even for use in agriculture. The mining industry, in addition to polluting the soil, also leaches many unwanted toxins, mainly heavy metals, into China's aquifers and rivers. Industrial plants, particularly from the textiles industry, have been secretly drilling into aquifers and injecting their waste underground to avoid having to use proper disposal methods. This behavior is strictly against Chinese law and yet it continues to lead to widespread groundwater contamination, which takes a very long time to dissipate, and which affects local populations who depend on it for everyday use. The North China Plain, as well as southwest China, have a problem with arsenic groundwater contamination (much of which comes from natural minerals in underground rock) which poses severe health risks.

A 2025 study titled Lithium Levels in Umbilical Cord Blood from Two Cities in China found unexpectedly high lithium concentrations in newborns.

March 2025, The Thallium Pollution Incident in Leishui, Hunan. Thallium (Tl) has caused increasingly serious environmental pollution in China due to industrial activities and illegal discharges.

To fight back against these issues, the Chinese government has made water cleanup a high priority. In 2020, the Ministry of Ecology and Environment enacted a plan to restrict agriculture near major rivers to lower the runoff pollution. China's chemical fertilizer use fell 5% from 2020-2025, after stricter regulations, which in turn has led to some improvement in surface water and soil quality. According to the Ministry of Agriculture and Environment, recycling of livestock waste had reached 80% by 2026. In 2021, China enacted the Yellow River Protection Law, to help clean up the river, limit groundwater pumping, ban mining and fishing near the upper reaches of the river, and to set standards for pollution discharge. By 2024, after this law was put in place, the river's water quality had seen improvement. However, solving groundwater pollution remains a significant long-term challenge for China.

=== Air pollution ===
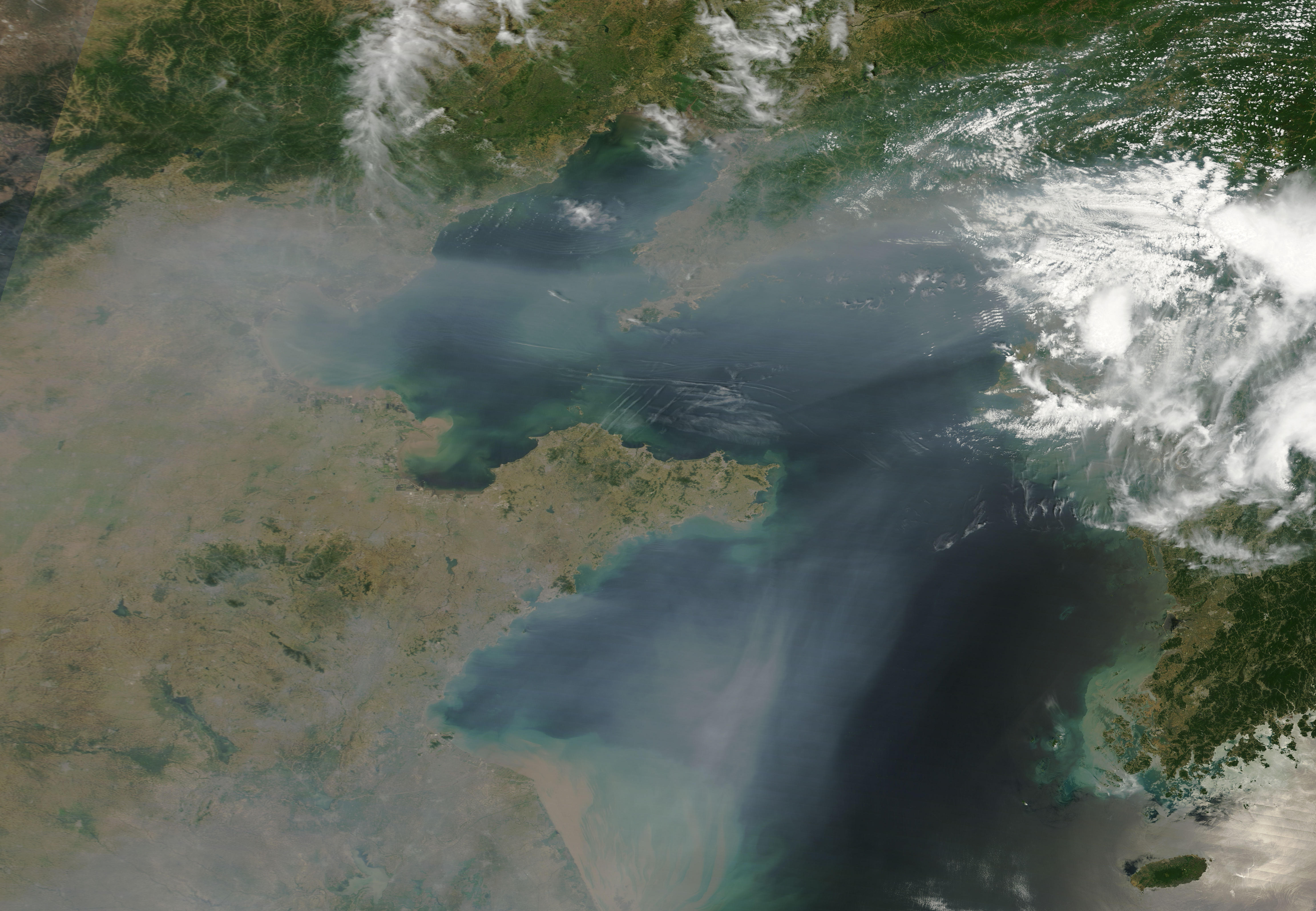
North-Eastern China from space, 2009. Thick haze blown off the Eastern coast of China, over Bo Hai Bay and the Yellow Sea. The haze might have resulted from urban and industrial pollution.

In northern China, air pollution from the burning of fossil fuels, principally coal, is causing people to die on average 5.5 years sooner than they otherwise might.

— Tim Flannery, Atmosphere of Hope, 2015.

Map of PM2.5 pollution over China from April to August 2014

Air pollution is a major public health issue in China. Over the past three decades, the rapid development of China has resulted in excessive emissions of greenhouse gases. Among the 337 cities, more than 40 percent of the major air pollutant concentrations exceeded Chinese standards. In the last few years, however, China has made significant progress in reducing air pollution. In 2016, only 84 out of 338 prefecture-level (administrative division of the People's Republic of China (PRC), ranking below a province and above a county) or higher cities attained the national standard for air quality. However, by 2018, those 338 cities enjoyed good air quality on 79% of days. The amount of harmful particulates in the air in China fell by 40% from 2013 to 2020.

Average PM2.5 concentrations fell by 33% from 2013 to 2017 in 74 cities. The overall pollution in China fell further 10% between 2017 and 2018. Another study shows that China reduced PM2.5 by 47% between 2005 and 2015. In August 2019, Beijing experienced the lowest PM2.5 on record—a low of 23 micrograms per cubic meter. Beijing was on track to drop out of the Top 200 most polluted cities by the end of 2019, and it did so in 2020. However, several times in 2026, Beijing made it back to the top 10 most polluted cities on earth (on June 19 for example), due to smog episodes, even though on average in 2025 it had been far below the national air pollution limit. The reasons for the average improvements are many fold: (1) Millions of homes and businesses are switching from coal to natural gas and (2) Afforestation measures. China is also the world's largest producer of electric cars.

Global carbon dioxide emissions by country in 2023:
1. China (31.8%)
2. United States (14.4%)
3. European Union (4.90%)
4. India (9.50%)
5. Russia (5.80%)
6. Japan (3.50%)
7. Other (30.1%)

Air pollution levels dropped in early 2020 due to quarantines addressing the coronavirus pandemic. By early 2021, however, the levels had risen again.

In more recent years, as the air quality in heavily-populated eastern China has continued to improve due to the government's crackdowns, many areas in western and southwestern China have seen worsening air pollution. This was particularly the case in 2025 in the autonomous regions of Guangxi and Xinjiang, as well as Yunnan Province, in both rural and urban settings. PM2.5 levels in these regions rose by 32%, 8%, and 14%, respectively, from 2024-2025. The expansion of the coal, steel, and non-ferrous metal industries, and resulting factories, in the west is largely responsible for this increase. This has occurred because the Chinese government has taken a particular interest, beginning in 2020, in industrially developing these areas, as southwestern China is particularly rich in energy resources.

Fireworks displays in Guangxi during the Chinese New Year have been a major seasonal contributor, particularly in 2025, in which stagnant weather conditions prevented the resulting smoke from dissipating, leaving cities such as Nanning and Yuling in a state of severe air pollution. On January 29, Nanning recorded a PM2.5 level of 1,632 μg/m^{3}, which is more than 46 times the national standard for air quality. Crop stubble burning in western China, in which farmers burn fields to get them ready for planting, contributes to springtime smoke pollution as well. The Chinese government has implemented some limits on when crop stubble burning can occur, but nonetheless this activity is still a major contributing factor to China's air quality problems. The government in central China has set a goal of lowering the PM2.5 levels to 25 μg/m^{3} or less by 2035, an even higher goal than the national standard of 35 μg/m^{3}, which will require much intentional planning and regulation.

China has invested significant sums into efforts to reduce air pollution. An example of this is that in 2013, China's Academy for Environmental Planning pledged $277 billion to combat urban air pollution. In the first batch of 74 cities that implemented the 2012 Environmental Air Quality Standards, the average concentration of PM2.5 and sulfur dioxide dropped by 42 percent and 68 percent, respectively, between 2013 and 2018.

Zhong Nanshan, the president of the China Medical Association, warned in 2012 that air pollution could become China's biggest health threat. Measurements by Beijing municipal government in January 2013 showed that highest recorded level of PM2.5 (particulate matter smaller than 2.5 micrometers in size), was at nearly 1,000 μg per cubic meter. PM_{2.5}, consisting of K^{+}, Ca^{2+}, NO_{3}^{−}, and SO_{4}^{2-}, had the most fearsome impact on people's health in Beijing throughout the year, especially in cold seasons. Traces of smog from mainland China has been observed to reach as far as California.

Sulfur dioxide emission peaked in 2006, after which it began to decline by 10.4% in 2008 compared to 2006. This was accompanied by improvements on related phenomenons such as lower frequency of acid rainfall. The adoption by power plants of flue-gas desulfurization technology was likely the main reason for reduced SO_{2} emissions.

With the rapid development of AI, and China's efforts to be a leader in this area, the country is dramatically increasing its semiconductor manufacturing. Sulfur hexafluoride (SF_{6}), a compound used in electrical insulators, has been increasingly emitted as a byproduct of these processes, particularly in and around Beijing. This gas is 24,300 times more effective at warming the atmosphere than carbon dioxide, the latter of which has continued to steadily decline in the Beijing area. The World Semiconductor Council, of which China is a member, committed in June 2026 to find ways to reduce the production of this gas in semiconductor manufacturing.

Large-scale use of formaldehyde in producing home building products in construction and furniture also contributes to indoor air pollution.

Air pollution in China is not just caused by human activity, but also by natural means, mainly dust storms blowing in from the area of Inner Mongolia, which can affect Chinese cities especially in the northern areas, most notably Beijing.

==== Particulates ====
Particulates are formed from both primary and secondary pathways. Primary sources such as coal combustion, biomass combustion and traffic directly emit particulate matter (PM). The emissions from power plants are considerably higher than in other countries, as most Chinese facilities do not employ any flue gas treatment. High secondary aerosol (particulates formed through atmospheric oxidation and reactions of gaseous organic compounds) contribution to particulate pollution in China is found. According to the U.S. Environmental Protection Agency, such fine particles can cause asthma, bronchitis, and acute and chronic respiratory symptoms such as shortness of breath and painful breathing, and may also lead to premature death.

According to the World Bank, the Chinese cities with the highest levels of particulate matter in 2004 of those studied were Tianjin, Chongqing, and Shenyang. In 2012 stricter air pollution monitoring of ozone and PM2.5 were ordered to be gradually implemented from large cities and key areas to all prefecture-level cities, and from 2015 all prefecture-level or higher cities were included. State media acknowledged the role of environmental campaigners in causing this change. On one micro-blog service, more than a million mostly positive comments were posted in less than 24 hours, although some wondered if the standards would be effectively enforced.

The US embassy in Beijing regularly posts automated air quality measurements at @beijingair on Twitter. On 18 November 2010, the feed described the PM2.5 AQI (Air Quality Index) as "Crazily bad" after registering a reading in excess of 500 for the first time. This description was later changed to "beyond index", a level which recurred in February, October, and December 2011.

In June 2012, following strongly divergent disclosures of particulate levels between the Observatory and the US Embassy, Chinese authorities asked foreign consulates to stop publishing "inaccurate and unlawful" data. Officials said it was "not scientific to evaluate the air quality of an area with results gathered from just only one point inside that area", and asserted that official daily average PM2.5 figures for Beijing and Shanghai were "almost the same with the results published by foreign embassies and consulates".

By January 2013 the pollution had worsened, with official Beijing data showing an average AQI of over 300 and readings of up to 700 at individual recording stations; the US Embassy recorded over 755 on 1 January and 800 by 12 January 2013.

On 21 October 2013, record smog in Northeast China temporarily closed all primary and middle schools in Harbin, as well as Harbin Airport. Daily particulate levels of more than 50 times the World Health Organization recommended daily level were reported in parts of the municipality.

In 2016, Beijing's yearly average PM2.5 was 73 μg/m^{3}, a 9.9% improvement compared to 2015. In total, 39 severely polluted days were recorded, 5 fewer compared to 2015.

2016 Air pollution in Beijing as measured by Air Quality Index (AQI) Severely polluted Heavily polluted Moderately polluted Lightly polluted Good Excellent

Analysis of the PM2.5 sources of some Chinese cities / regions (click "show" to expand the table)

Location	Main Sources of PM2.5	Sampling Time Period	Method
Ningbo	Urban dust (20.42%), coal dust (14.37%) and vehicle exhaust (15.15%)	15–24 Mar 2010; 31 May–9 June 2010; 10–19 Dec 2010	CMB
Urumchi	Urban dust (24.7%), coal dust (15.6%) and secondary particles (38.0%)	19–30 Jan 2013	CMB
Qizhou	Dust (21–35%), secondary particles (25–26%) and vehicle exhaust (21–26%)	Sep 2013; Feb–Mar 2014; May 2014	CMB
Ningbo	Urban dust (19.9%), coal dust (14.4%), secondary sulfate (16.9%), vehicle exhaust (15.2%), secondary nitrate (9.78%) and secondary organic carbon (8.85%)	25–31 Jan 2010; 31 May–6 June 2010; 10–16 Oct 2010	CMB
Tianjin	Open source (urban dust, soil dust and construction cement dust, total contribution of 30%), Secondary particles (secondary sulfate/nitrate, secondary carbon, total contribution of 28%), coal dust (19.6%) and vehicle exhaust (15.9%)	13–20 May 2010; 20–27 Oct 2010; 19–26 Dec 2010	CMB
Chongqing	Secondary particles (30.1%) and moving source (27.9%)	6–28 Feb 2012; 6–28 Aug 2012; 19–27 Oct 2012; 7–29 Dec 2012	CMB
Beijing	Secondary inorganic salts (36%), organic matter (20%), vehicle/fuel (16%), coal burning (15%), soil dust (6%) and others (7%)	Aug 2012–July 2013, continuous for 5 to 7 days per month	CMB
Xining	Urban dust (26.24%), coal dust (14.5%), vehicle exhaust (12.8%), secondary sulphate (9.0%), biomass burning (6.6%), secondary nitrates (5.7%), steel dust (4.7%), construction dust (4.4%), soil dust (4.4%), food and beverage emissions (2.9%) and other unidentified sources (5.2%)	26 Feb–4 Mar 2014; 22–28 Apr 2014; 19–25 Sep 2014	CMB
Xingtai	Coal dust (25%), secondary inorganic particles (sulfate and nitrate, 45%), vehicle exhaust (11%), dust (9%), soil dust (3%), construction and metallurgical dust (1%) and other unidentified sources (3%)	24 Feb–15 Mar 2014; 22 Apr–19 May 2014; 15–28 July 2014	CMB
Wuhan	Vehicle sources (27.1%), secondary sulphates/nitrates (26.8%), manufacturing emissions (26.4%) and biomass combustion (19.6%)	July 2011–Feb 2012	CMB
Chengdu	Soil dust and raise dust (14.3%), biomass combustion (28.0%), vehicle sources (24.0%) and secondary nitrates/sulfates (31.3%)	29 Apr–17 May 2009; 6 July–6 Aug 2009; 26 Oct–26 Nov 2009; 1–31 Jan 2010	CMB
Shenzhen	Secondary sulphate (30.0%), vehicle sources (26.9%), biomass combustion (9.8%) and secondary nitrates (9.3%)	Jan–Dec 2009	CMB
Suburbs of Shanghai	Secondary aerosol (50.8%), fuel combustion (17.5%), biomass combustion/sea salt (17.2%), raise dust/construction dust (7.7%), and coal-burning/smelting dust (6.9%)	23 Dec 2012–18 Feb 2014	CMB
North China	Coal combustion (29.6%), biomass combustion (19.3%) and vehicle sources (15.9%)	3 Jan–11 Feb 2014	CMB
Lanzhou	Steel industry, secondary aerosols, coal combustion, power plants, vehicle emissions, crustal dust, and smelting industry contributed 7.1%, 33.0%, 28.7%, 3.12%, 8.8%, 13.3%, and 6.0%, respectively, in winter, and 6.7%, 14.8%, 3.1%, 3.4%, 25.2%, 11.6% and 35.2% in summer	Winter 2012 and summer 2013	PMF
Chongqing	Secondary inorganic aerosols (37.5%), coal combustion (22.0%), other industrial pollution (17.5%), soil dust (11.0%), vehicular emission (9.8%) and metallurgical industry (2.2%)	2012–2013	PMF
Yellow River Delta National Nature Reserve (YRDNNR)	Secondary sulphate and nitrate (54.3%), biomass burning (15.8%), industry (10.7%), crustal matter (8.3%), vehicles (5.2%) and copper smelting (4.9%)	Jan–Nov 2011	PMF
Shanghai	Coal burning (30.5%), gasoline engine emission (29.0%), diesel engine emission (17.5%), air-surface exchange (11.9%) and biomass burning (11.1%)	Oct 2011–Aug 2012	PMF
Zhengzhou	Coal burning (29%), vehicle (26%), dust (21%), secondary aerosols (17%) and biomass burning (4%)	Apr 2011–Dec 2013	PMF
Qingshan District, Wuhan	Traffic exhaust (28.60%), industry (27.10%), road dust (22%), coal combustion (13.20%) and building dust (9.5%)	15 Nov–28 Dec 2013	PMF
Beijing	Industrial dust and human activities (40.3%), biomass combustion and building dust (27.0%), soil and wind induced dust (9.1%), fossil fuel sources (4.9%), electronic waste sources (4.8%) and regional migration sources (4.6%)	16 Jan–28 Feb 2013	FA
Hangdan	Secondary aerosol source, transportation, fossil fuel and biomass burning (46.5%), soil and construction dust (19.5%), steel industry (19.5%) and transportation (9%)	Jan, Apr, July and Oct 2015	PCA
Hangdan	Industry and coal burning (33.3%), secondary aerosol and biomass burning (21.7%), vehicle (12.8%) and road dust (9.1%),	Oct 2012–Jan 2013	PCA
Guangzhou	Moving sources (37.4%), industrial emissions (32.2%), electricity emissions (12.2%), residential emissions (6.6%) and others (11.6%)	Jan–Dec 2013	WRF/Chem+ observation data analysis
Heze	Secondary inorganic salt (32.61%), vehicle emissions (22.60%), raise dust (19.64%), coal dust (16.25%) and construction cement dust (9.00%)	13–22 Aug 2015; 21–30 Oct 2015; 14–23 Jan 2016 7–16 Apr 2016	PMF and backward trajectory model
Tianjin	Secondary sources (30%), crustal dust (25%), vehicle exhaust (16%), coal combustion (13%), SOC (7.6%) and cement dust (0.40%)	Apr 2014–Jan 2015	Chemical mass balance gas constraint-Iteration (CMBGC-Iteration)
Tianjin	Secondary sources (28%), crustal dust (20%), coal combustion (18%), vehicle exhaust (17%), SOC (11%) and cement dust (1.3%)	Apr 2014–Jan 2015	Ensemble-average of CMB, CMB-Iteration, CMB-GC, PMF, WALSPMF, and NCAPCA
25 Chinese provincial capitals and municipalities	Power plants (8.7–12.7%), agriculture NH3 (9.5–12%), windblown dust (6.1–12.5%) and secondary organic aerosol (SOA) (5.4–15.5%)	2013	Community Multiscale Air Quality (CMAQ) model
Xinzhen District, Beijing	Coal burning (29.2%), vehicle exhaust and waste incineration (26.2%), construction industry (23.3%), soil (15.4%) and industry with chlorine (5.9%)	19 May 2007 – 19 July 2013	Particle Induced X-ray Emission(PIXE), X-Ray Fluorescence (XRF), and PMF
Beijing	Coal (28.06%), vehicle (19.73%), dust (17.88%), industry (16.50%), food (3.43%) and plant (3.40%)	2012	Inventory-Chemical Mass Balance (I-CMB)

The above results are summarised from multiple research papers. Methods used; CMB: chemical mass balance method; PMF: positive matrix factorization; FA: factor analysis; PCA: principal component analysis; WRF: Weather Research and Forecasting; WALSPMF: Weighted Alternating Least Squares Positive Matrix Factorization; NCAPCA: Non-negative Constrained Absolutely Principle Analysis.

==== Government's response to the air pollution ====
In an attempt to reduce air pollution, the Chinese government decided to enforce stricter regulations. After record-high air pollution in northern China in 2012 and 2013, the State Council issued an Action Plan for the Prevention and Control of Air Pollution in September 2013. This plan aimed to reduce PM2.5 by over 10% from 2012 to 2017. Twelve west-east air pollution control transmission corridors are also being developed, per the Action Plan.

The most prominent government response has been in Beijing, aiming to reduce PM2.5 by 25% from 2012 to 2017. As the capital of China, Beijing suffers from high levels of air pollution. According to Reuters, the Chinese government published the plan to tackle the air pollution problem on its official website in September 2013. The main goal of the plan is to reduce coal consumption by closing polluting mills, factories, and smelters and switching to other eco-friendly energy sources.

These policies have been taking effect, and in 2015, the average PM2.5 in 74 key cities under the monitoring system was 55 μg/m^{3}, showing a 23.6% decrease as of 2013. Despite the reduction in coal consumption and polluting industries, China still maintained a stable economic growth rate from 7.7% in 2013 to 6.9% in 2015.

On 20 August 2015, ahead of the 70th-anniversary celebrations of the end of World War II, the Beijing government shut down industrial facilities and reduced car emissions in order to achieve a "Parade Blue" sky for the occasion. This action resulted in PM2.5 concentration lower than the 35 μg/m^{3} national air quality standard, according to data from Beijing Municipal Environmental Protection Monitoring Centre (BMEMC). The restrictions resulted in an average Beijing PM2.5 concentration of 19.5 μg/m^{3}, the lowest that had ever been on record in the capital.

China's strategy has been mainly focused on the development of other energy sources such as nuclear, hydro and compressed natural gas. The latest plan entails closing the outdated capacity of the industrial sectors like iron, steel, aluminum and cement and increasing nuclear capacity and other non-fossil fuel energy. It also includes an intention to stop approving new thermal power plants and to cut coal consumption in industrial areas.

According to research, substituting all coal consumption for residential and commercial use to natural gas requires additional 88 billion cubic meters of natural gas, which is 60% of China's total consumption in 2012, incurring a net cost of 32–52 billion dollars. Substituting the share of coal-fired power plants with renewable and nuclear energy also requires 700GW of additional capacity, which costs 184 billion dollars. Therefore, the net cost would be 140–160 billion dollars considering the value of saved coal. Since all the above policies have been already partially implemented by national and city governments, some believe that they can lead to substantial improvements in urban air quality.

In northern China, air pollution from the burning of fossil fuels, principal [sic] coal, is causing people to die on average 5.5 years sooner than they otherwise might.

— Tim Flannery, Atmosphere of Hope, 2015.

==== Four-color alert system ====
Beijing launched the four-color alert system in 2013. It is based on the air quality index (AQI), which indicates how clean or polluted the air is.

The Beijing government revised their four-color alert system at the start of 2016, increasing the levels of pollution required to trigger orange and red alerts. The change was introduced to standardize the alert levels across four cities including Tianjin and four cities in Hebei, and perhaps in direct response to the red alerts issues the previous December.

AQI	Description
101–150	Slight pollution
151–200	Moderate pollution
201–300	Heavy pollution
301–500	Hazardous

Color	Condition
Blue	"Heavy pollution" in the next 24 hours
Yellow	"Hazardous" in the next 24 hours; or "heavy pollution" for three consecutive days
Orange	Alternate "heavy pollution" and "hazardous" days for three consecutive days
Red	Average of "heavy pollution" for four consecutive days, "hazardous" for two consecutive days or average AQI over 500 for one day and can be very dangerous.

=== Light pollution ===
With active economic growth and a huge number of citizens, China is considered the largest developing country in the world. Due to urbanization, light pollution generally is an environmental factor that significantly influences the quality and health of wildlife. According to Pengpeng Han et al., "In the 1990s, the increasing trend in light pollution regions mostly occurred in larger urban cities, which are mainly located in eastern and coastal areas, whereas the decreasing trend areas were chiefly industrial and mining cities rich in mineral resources, in addition to the central parts of large cities". In the 2000s, nearly all urban cities were dominated by an uprising trend in light pollution.

== Common pollutants ==
=== Lead ===
Lead poisoning was described in a 2001 paper as one of the most common pediatric health problems in China. A 2006 review of existing data suggested that one-third of Chinese children suffer from elevated serum lead levels. Pollution from metal smelters and a fast-growing battery industry has been responsible for most cases of, particularly high lead levels. In 2011, there were riots in the Zhejiang Haijiu Battery Factory from angry parents whose children received permanent neurological damage from lead poisoning. The central government has acknowledged the problem and has taken measures, such as suspending battery factory production, but some see the response as inadequate and some local authorities have tried to silence criticisms.

A literature review of academic studies on Chinese children's blood lead levels found that the lead levels declined when comparing the studies published during the 1995–2003 and 2004–2007 periods. Lead levels also showed a declining trend after China banned lead in gasoline in 2000. Lead levels were still higher than those in developed nations. Industrial areas had higher levels than suburban areas, which had higher levels than urban areas. Controlling and preventing lead poisoning was described as a long-term mission.

=== Persistent organic pollutants ===
China is a signatory nation of the Stockholm Convention, a treaty to control and phase out major persistent organic pollutants (POP). A plan of action for 2010 includes objectives such as eliminating the production, import and use of the pesticides covered under the convention, as well as an accounting system for PCB containing equipment. For 2015, China plans to establish an inventory of POP-contaminated sites and remediation plans. Since May 2009, this treaty also covers polybrominated diphenyl ethers and perfluorooctanesulfonic acid. Perfluorinated compounds are associated with altered thyroid function and decreased sperm count in humans. China faces challenges in controlling and eliminating POPs, since they often are cheaper than their alternatives or are unintentionally produced and then released into the environment to save on treatment costs.

=== Yellow dust ===
The Yellow dust or Asian dust is a seasonal dust cloud that affects Northeast Asia during late winter and springtime. The dust originates in the deserts of Mongolia, northern China and Kazakhstan where high-speed surface winds and intense dust storms kick up dense clouds of fine, dry soil particles. These clouds are then carried eastward by prevailing winds and pass over Northern China into Korea and Japan.

Desertification has intensified in China. 1,740,000 square kilometres of land is classified as "dry", and desertification disrupts the lives of 400 million people and causes direct economic losses of 54 billion yuan ($7 billion) a year. Sulfur (an acid rain component), soot, ash, carbon monoxide, and other toxic pollutants including heavy metals (such as mercury, cadmium, chromium, arsenic, lead, zinc, copper) and other carcinogens, often accompany the dust storms, as well as viruses, bacteria, fungi, pesticides, antibiotics, asbestos, herbicides, plastic ingredients, combustion products and hormone mimicking phthalates.

=== Coal ===
The increasing number of air pollutants can cause incidents of low visibility for days and acid rain. According to the article "Air Pollution in Mega Cities in China", "Coal accounts for 70% of the total energy consumption, and emissions from coal combustion are the major anthropogenic contributors to air pollution in China." The Proceedings of the National Academy of Sciences also highlights the Huai River Policy established during China's central planning period between 1950 and 1980. The policy provided homes and offices with free coal for winter heating but was limited solely to the Northern region due to budget limitations. The policy led to a dramatic increase in coal consumption and production. Coal production alongside rapid economic growth has increased the emission of harmful pollutants such as carbon dioxide, sulfur dioxide, nitrogen oxide, and small particle matter known as PM2.5 and PM10. Long-term exposure to pollutants can cause health risks such as respiratory diseases, cancer, cardiovascular and cerebrovascular diseases. Coal is a huge issue because of the SO2 emissions from coal factories. According to the article, "SO2 exceeded the Chinese Grade-II standards in 22% of the country's cities and caused acid rain problems in 38% of the cities."

=== Medical Waste ===
Since 2019, China has been reported to have observed an increase in the capacity of medical waste it was expected to get rid of. According to China's "Ministry of Ecology and Environment," as of 2022, "447 000 tonnes of medical waste" was expected to be disposed of. The country is suggested to be on the right track regarding the disposal of waste produced medically since its capacity is expected to handle approximately 2M tonnes of waste annually. Compared with 2019, China, as of 2021, reported a 39% increase in their performance, which led to the conclusion that the country is doing well as far as the management and control of harmful and toxic chemicals such as microplastics, antibiotics, endocrine disruptors, and organic pollutants persistent in medical waste are concerned.

Medical waste falls under hazardous materials. In doing so, the government has stricter policies and regulations for disposing of this waste. Many Providences in China, especially in Wuhan, had to create a solution to improve medical waste collection and disposal.

In the new era of China's green development, China has worked hard to ensure the safe and effective disposal of solid, hazardous, and medical waste. It has created a greener environment by building a system of environmental infrastructure that facilities, monitors, and supervises the treatment and proper disposal of sewage, garbage, and hazardous waste.

Beyond its boundaries, China has been a part of projects such as one with Nepal's Narayani Hospital, which, in 2022, opened a medical waste management center. In conjunction with UNDP and with financial help from China through the GDF, the Nepali hospital acquired waste management tools and equipment such as segregation chambers, waste bins, medical trolleys, protective gears, needle cutters, and more. China's waste management project involves reducing pollution and improving living and health standards for the patients, the general hospital, and its neighbors. Other nations benefiting from China's expertise in medical waste disposal include Myanmar, the Philippines, Laos, and Cambodia.

During the program, specific training was provided on standard operations regarding medical waste disposal. Twenty officials and 45 others from different hospitals were used to control waste management. After the program's positive outcome, Narayani Hospital became one of the few hospitals to have proper disposal of medical waste and an adequate waste treatment system.

Even so, the Chinese government's involvement does not end with the GDF projects. In 2021, according to customs, China recovered 189.9M U.S. dollars' worth of smuggled goods in 404 cases. Among the smuggled goods were "imported waste," which included psychotropic drugs and precursor chemicals in a total of 33 reported cases. Though the cases are concerning, they communicate China's ability to dispose of waste.

=== Other pollutants ===
In 2010, 49 employees at Wintek were poisoned by n-hexane in the manufacturing of touchscreens for Apple products.

In 2013, it was revealed that portions of the country's rice supply were tainted with the toxic metal cadmium.

== Impact of pollution ==
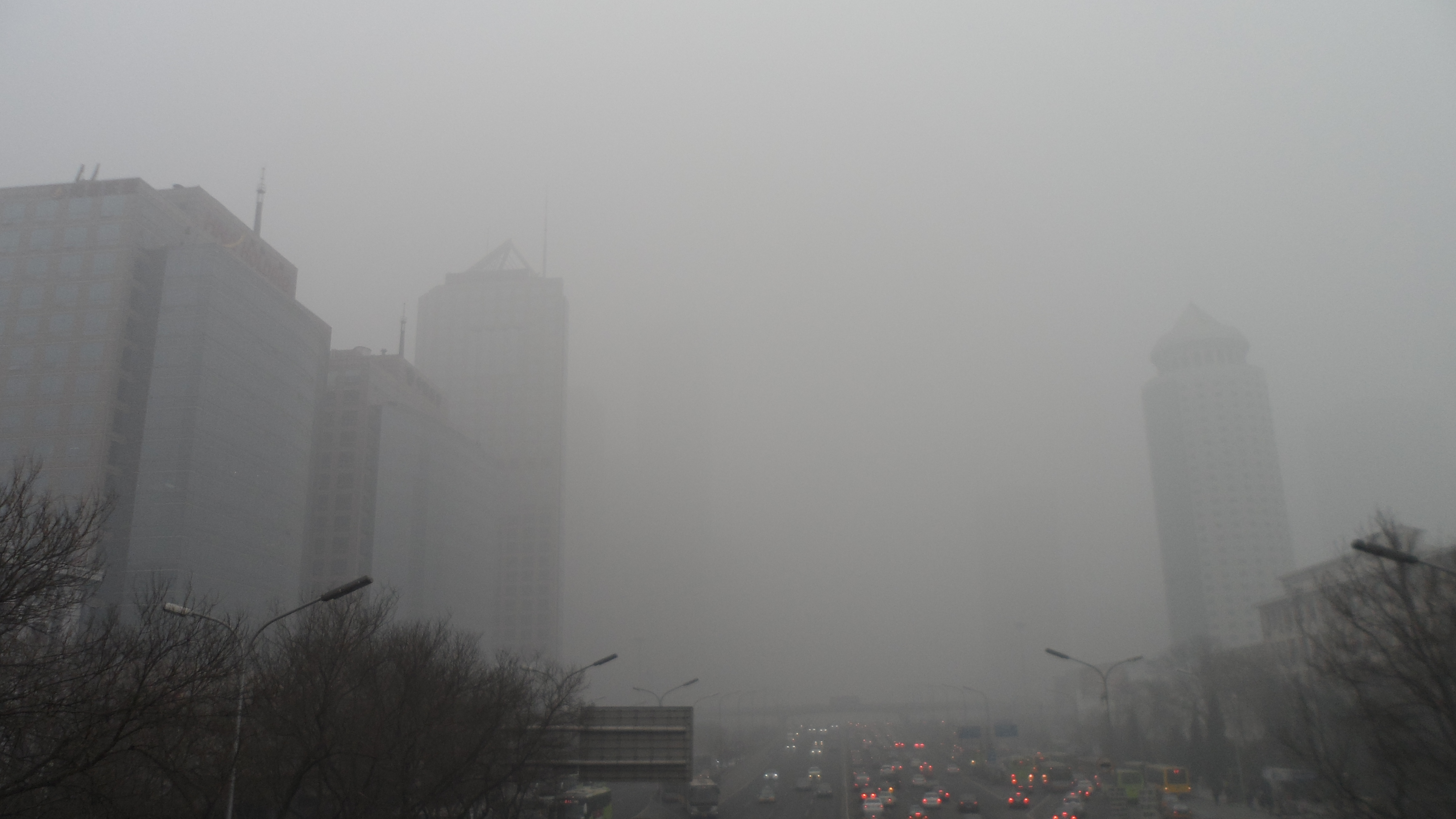
Smog in Beijing, 2013

A 2006 Chinese green gross domestic product estimate stated that pollution in 2004 cost 3.05% of the nation's economy.

A 2007 World Bank and SEPA report estimated the cost of water and air pollution in 2003 to be 2.68% or 5.78% of GDP depending on the use of either a Chinese or a Western method of calculation.

A 2009 review stated a range of 2.2–10% of GDP.

A 2012 study stated that pollution had little effect on economic growth, which in China's case was largely dependent on physical capital expansion and increased energy consumption due to the dependency on manufacturing and heavy industries. China was predicted to continue to grow using energy-inefficient and polluting industries. While growth may continue, the rewards of this growth may be opposed by the harm from the pollution unless environmental protection is increased.

A 2013 study published in the Proceedings of the National Academy of Sciences found that severe pollution during the 1990s cut five and a half (5.5) years from the average life expectancy of people living in northern China, where toxic air has led to increased rates of stroke, heart disease and cancer.

A 2015 study from the non-profit organization Berkeley Earth estimated that 1.6 million people in China die each year from heart, lung and stroke problems because of polluted air.

Ironically, a 2024 study found that precipitous declines in pollution, following the 2013 clean air action plan, may have contributed to the anomalous Blob, an immense and intense patch of warming in the Pacific Ocean. Said pollution appears to have scattered and blocked heat from the sun. However, experts stress that there were many factors causing the Blob, not the least of which was greenhouse gas emissions.

== Pollution ratings ==
As of 2019:

- The top five cities with the best air quality: Lhasa, Haikou, Zhoushan, Xiamen, Huangshan
- The 10 cities with the worst air quality: Anyang, Xingtai, Shijiazhuang, Handan, Linfen, Tangshan, Taiyuan, Zibo, Jiaozuo, Jincheng

According to the National Environmental Analysis released by Tsinghua University and The Asian Development Bank in January 2013, seven of the ten most air polluted cities in the world are in China, including Taiyuan, Beijing, Urumqi, Lanzhou, Chongqing, Jinan and Shijiazhuang.

== National Sword Policy ==
The Operation National Sword (ONS) was a policy initiative the government of China launched in 2017 to monitor and more stringently review imports of recyclable waste. By 1 January 2018, China had banned 24 categories of solid waste and had also stopped importing plastic waste with a contamination level of above 0.05 percent, which was significantly lower than the 10 percent that it had previously allowed. Before the policy, China was importing the vast majority of recyclables from North America and Europe for two decades. This practice of buying recyclables brought raw materials for the growing industrial capacity of China, but also brought a lot of contaminated recyclables which ended up accumulating in China, causing other environmental concerns such as air and water pollution.

China first brought awareness of its intention to limit its imports of contaminated waste and recyclables back in 2013, through its Operation Green Fence program, which consequently impacted Western waste exporters negatively. The latter ONS policy was interpreted as an international relations move by China against Western countries. The policy caused a ripple effect in the global recyclables market, causing major pile ups in Western countries who had been collecting lower quality recyclables in single-stream recycling, and displacing some of those recyclable to other countries, mostly in South East Asia, like Vietnam and Malaysia.

Since 2026, China has gradually restarted the import of foreign waste due to increased recycling capacity.

== See also (some in only original Chinese) ==
- 2009 Chinese lead poisoning scandal
- 2013 Eastern China smog
- 2013 Northeastern China smog
- Automotive industry in China
- China Energy Conservation Investment Corporation
- China Pollution Map Database
- Clear waters and green mountains
- Climate change in China
- Construction
- Environment of China
- Environmental issues in China
- Heavy metal
- Joss paper
- Phase-out of lightweight plastic bags
- Brother Nut
- List of power stations in China
- Low-carbon economy
- Peak oil
- Renewable energy in China
- Renovation
- Soot
- List of countries by energy consumption and production
- Category:Energy by country
- Haze
- Smog
1. Air Pollution Prevention and Control Law (1987)
2. Air Pollution Prevention and Control Law (1995)
3. Air Pollution Prevention and Control Law (2000)
4. Air Pollution Prevention and Control Law (2015)
5. Air Pollution Prevention and Control Law (2018)
6. Soil Pollution Prevention and Control law
7. Solid Waste Pollution Prevention and Control law
8. Radioactive Pollution Prevention and Control law
