= Environment of China =

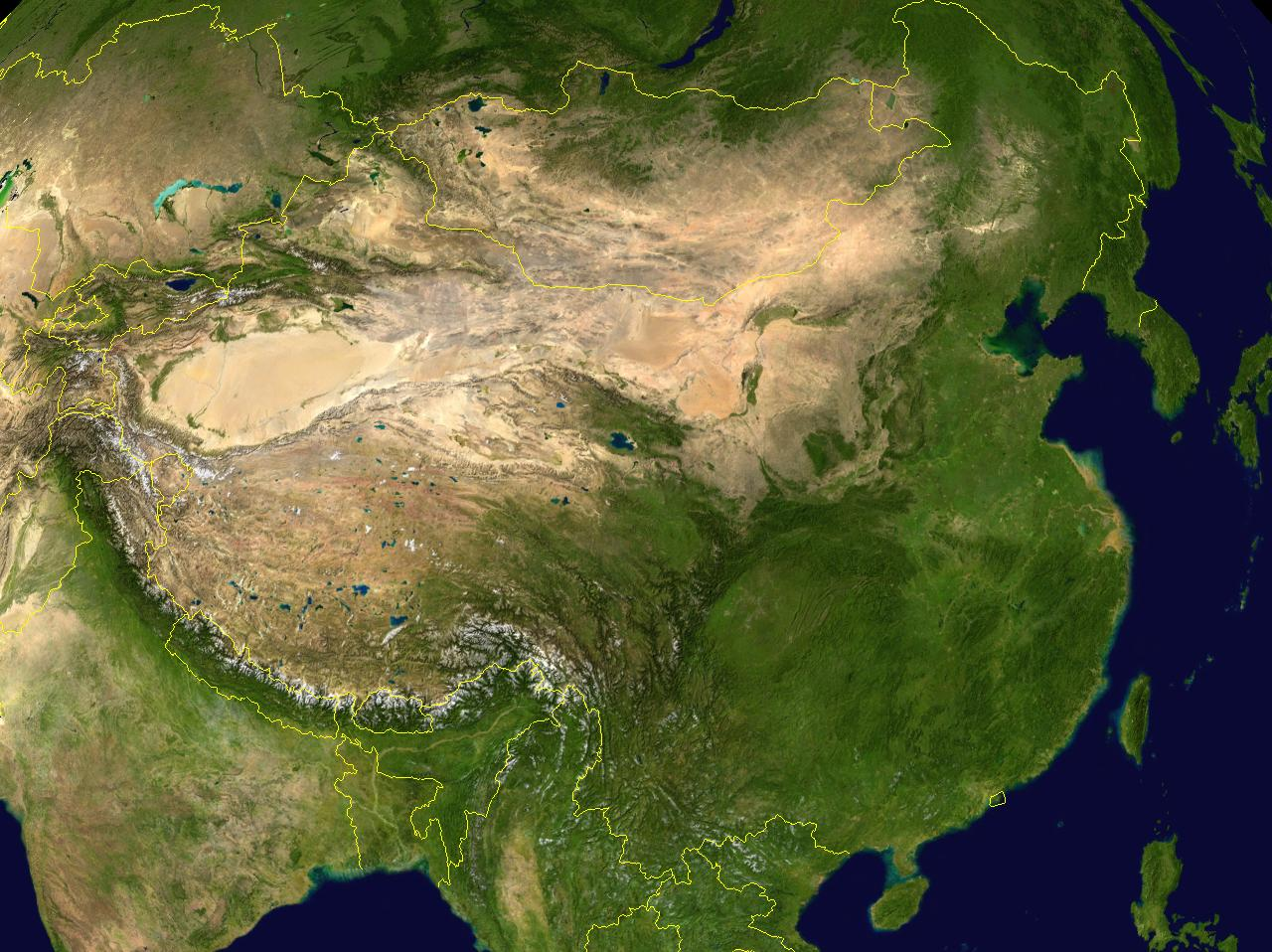
Satellite image of China

The environment of China (Chinese: 中国的环境) comprises diverse geology, rich biota, and varied climates, ranging from arid deserts to subtropical forests. However, rapid industrialization and lax environmental oversight have caused many environmental issues and large-scale pollution, including severe air pollution.

China faces critical issues such as some of the highest levels of air pollution globally, with fine particulate matter (PM_{2.5} and PM_{10}) linked to adverse health effects and increased mortality. Additionally, climate change has intensified extreme weather events, rising temperatures, further impacting ecosystems and human populations. In response, the Chinese government has implemented extensive environmental policies, such as the Air Pollution Prevention and Control Action Plan and the Ecological Civilization Initiative, along with carbon neutrality goal to combat climate change.

== Geology ==
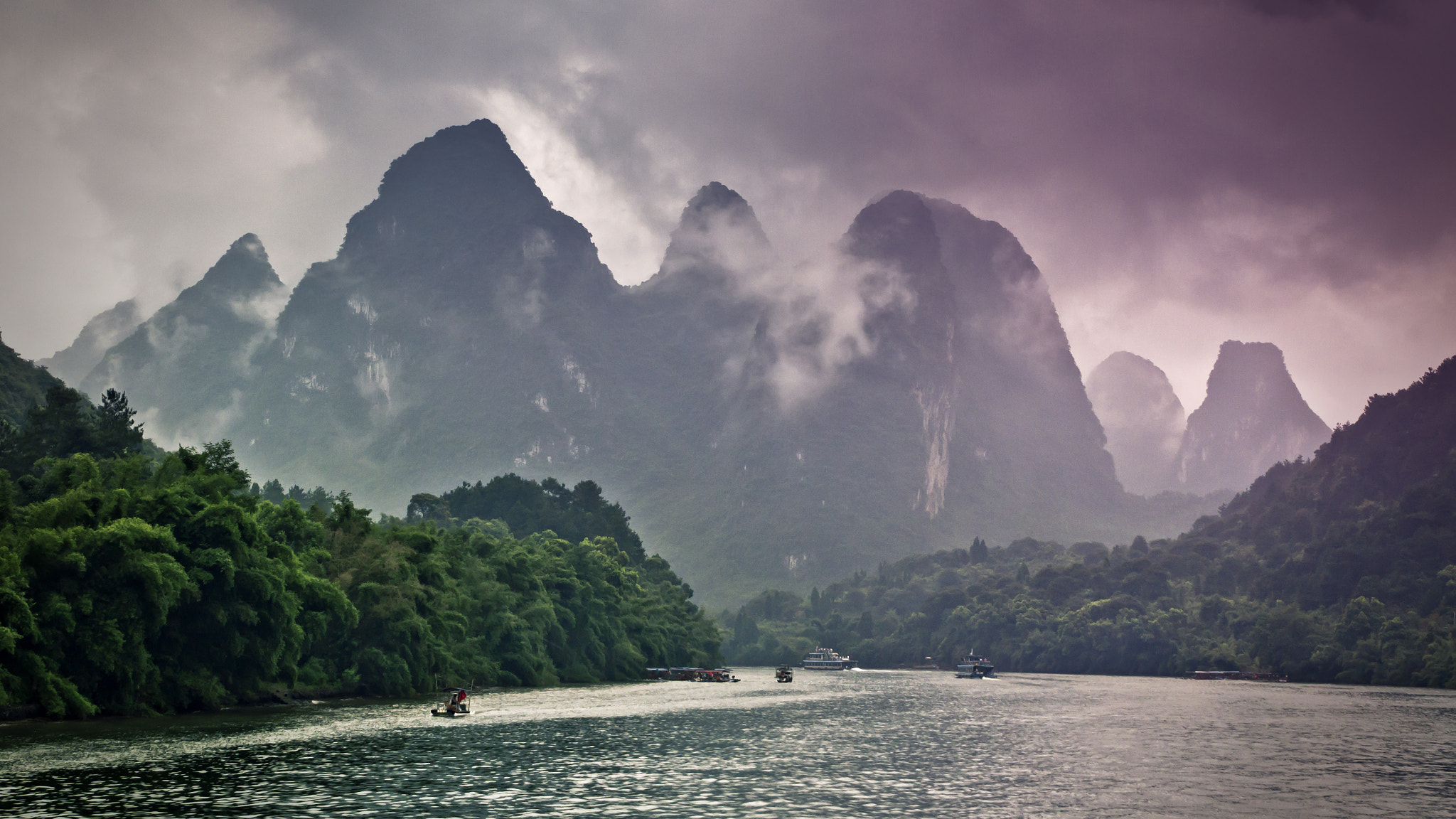
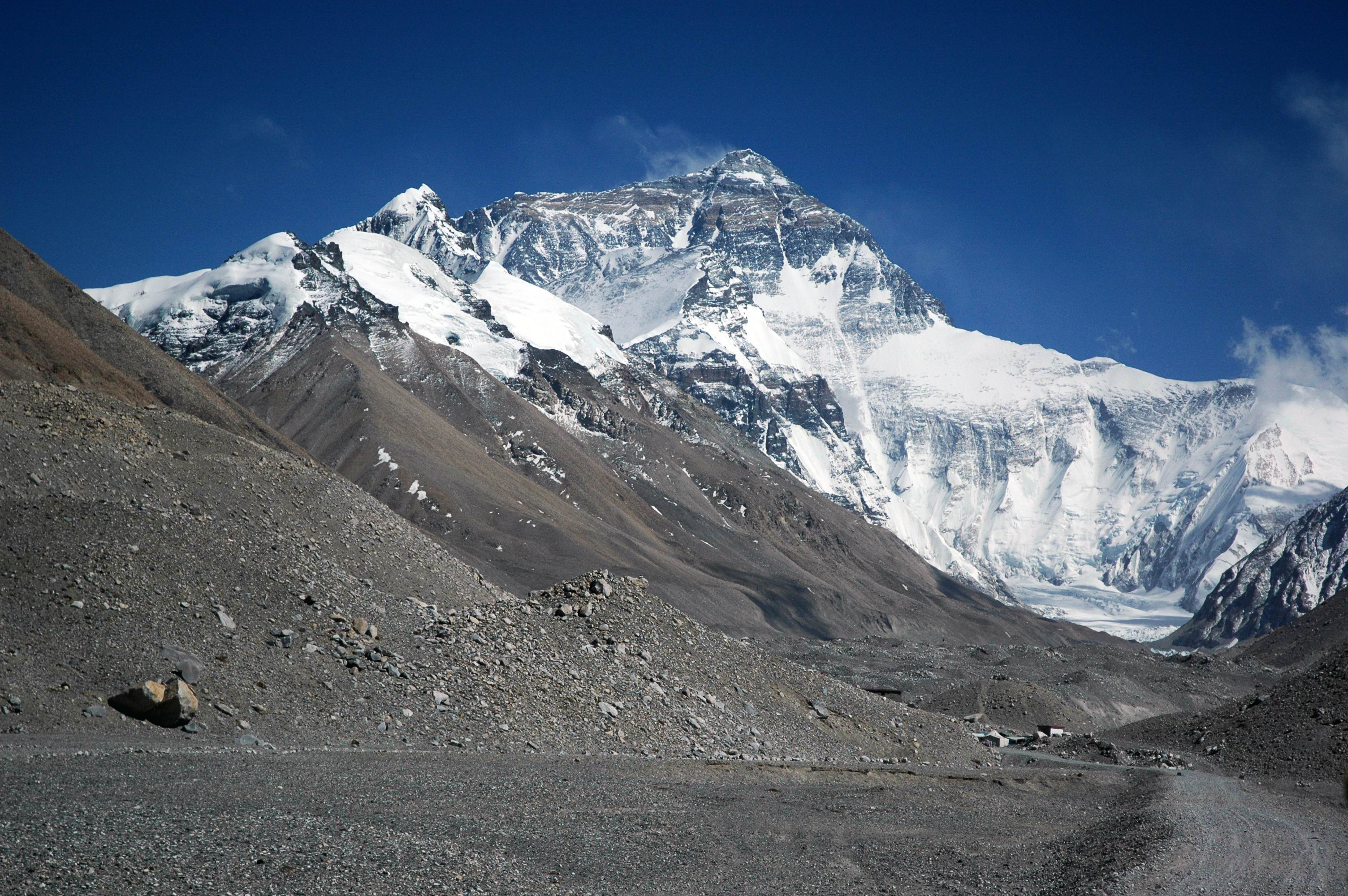
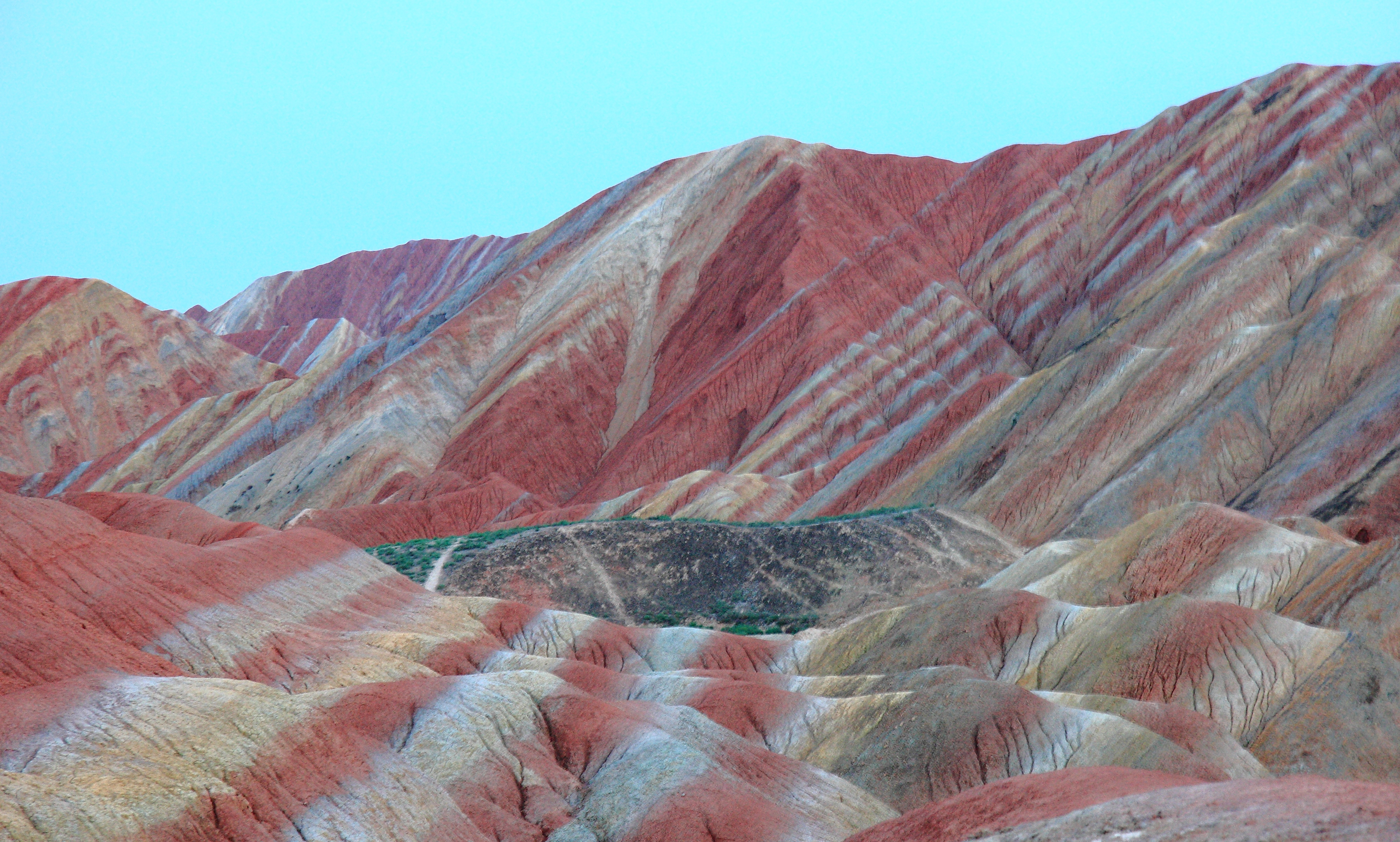
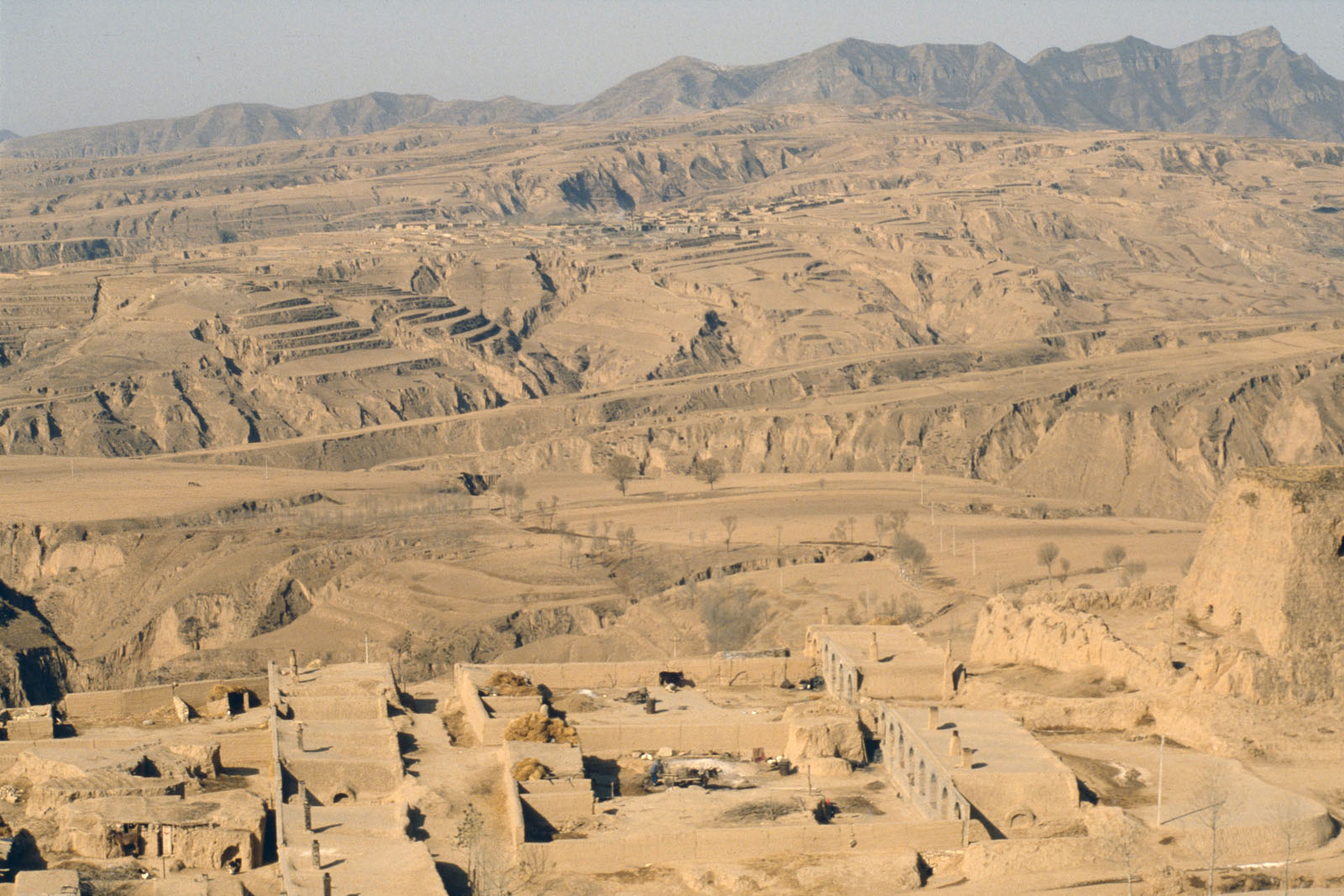
Clockwise from upper left: Li River karst, Mount Everest's north face, loess landscape in Datong and Zhangye National Geopark.

The geology of China (or the geological structure of the People's Republic of China) consists of three Precambrian cratons surrounded by a number of orogenic belts. The modern tectonic environment is dominated by the continued collision of India with the rest of Asia starting 40–50 million years ago. This has formed the Himalayas and continues to deform most of China. China has vast mineral reserves, a significant earthquake risk in its western regions and rare isolated active volcanoes throughout the country.

Many geological concepts were discovered very early in China's history. However, it was not until the adoption of European natural science in the late 19th century that geology became a science in China.

== Biota ==
=== Wildlife ===
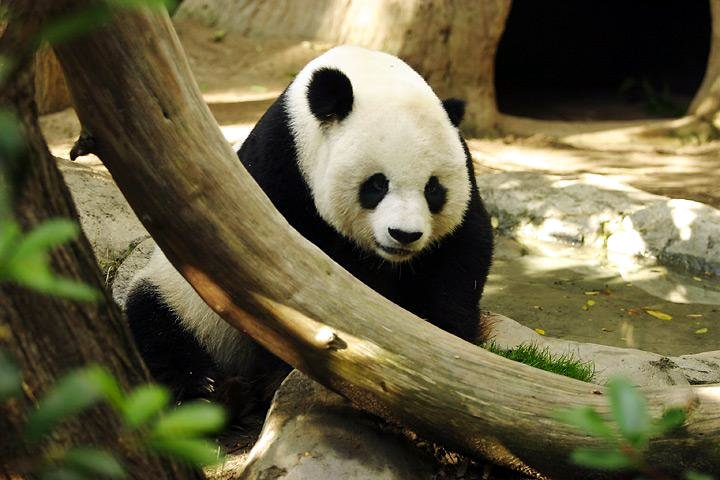
The giant panda is endemic to China, where it is an endangered and protected species.

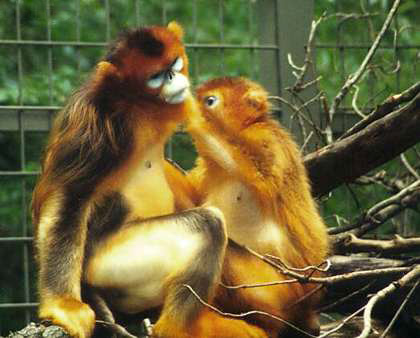
The snub-nosed monkey, another endangered and endemic species

China's vast and diverse landscape is home to a profound variety and abundance of wildlife. As of one of 17 megadiverse countries in the world, China has, according to one measure, 7,516 species of vertebrates including 4,936 fish, 1,269 bird, 562 mammal, 403 reptile and 346 amphibian species. In terms of the number of species, China ranks third in the world in mammals, eighth in birds, seventh in reptiles and seventh in amphibians.

Many species of animals are endemic to China, including the country's most famous wildlife species, the giant panda. In all, about one-sixth of mammal species and two-thirds of amphibian species in China are endemic to the country.

Wildlife in China share habitat with and bear acute pressure from the world's second largest population of humans. At least 840 species are threatened, vulnerable or in danger of local extinction in China, due mainly to human activity such as habitat destruction, pollution and poaching for food, fur and ingredients for traditional Chinese medicine. Endangered wildlife is protected by law, and as of 2005, the country has over 2,349 nature reserves, covering a total area of 149.95 million hectares (578,960 square miles), about 15 percent of China's total land area.

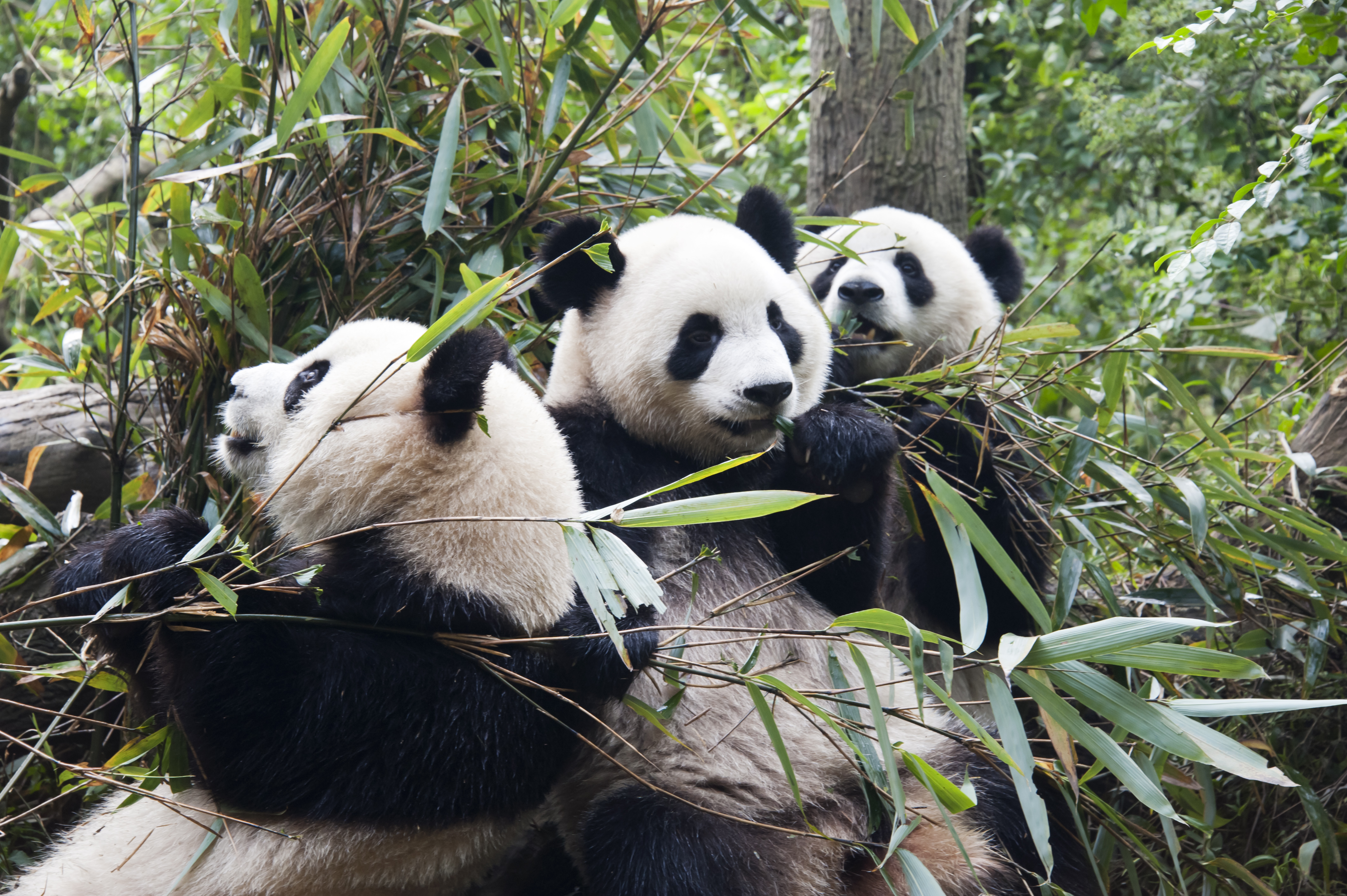
Panda in Sichuan

=== Flora ===
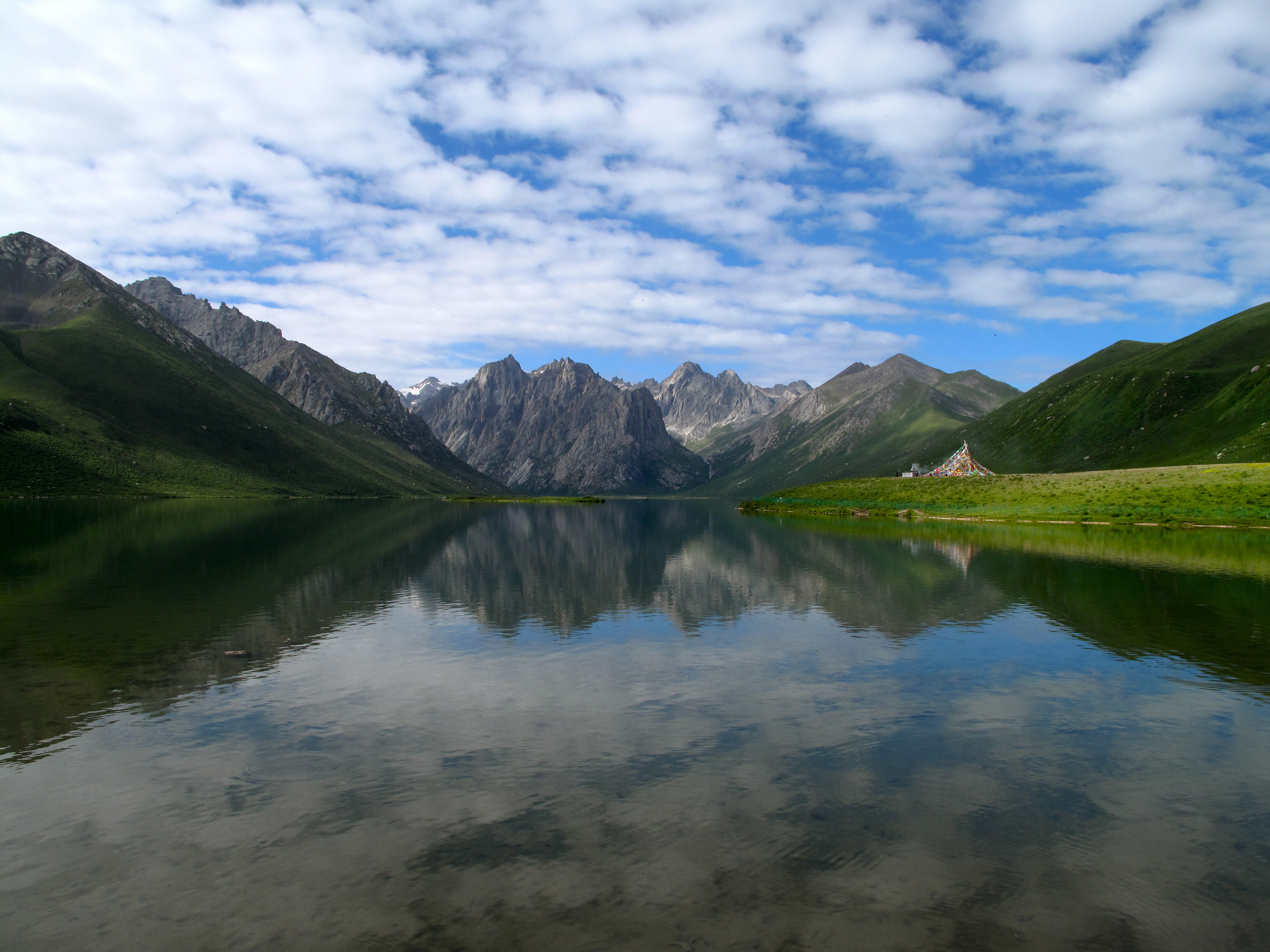
Overlooking Lake Ximencuo on the Tibetan Plateau

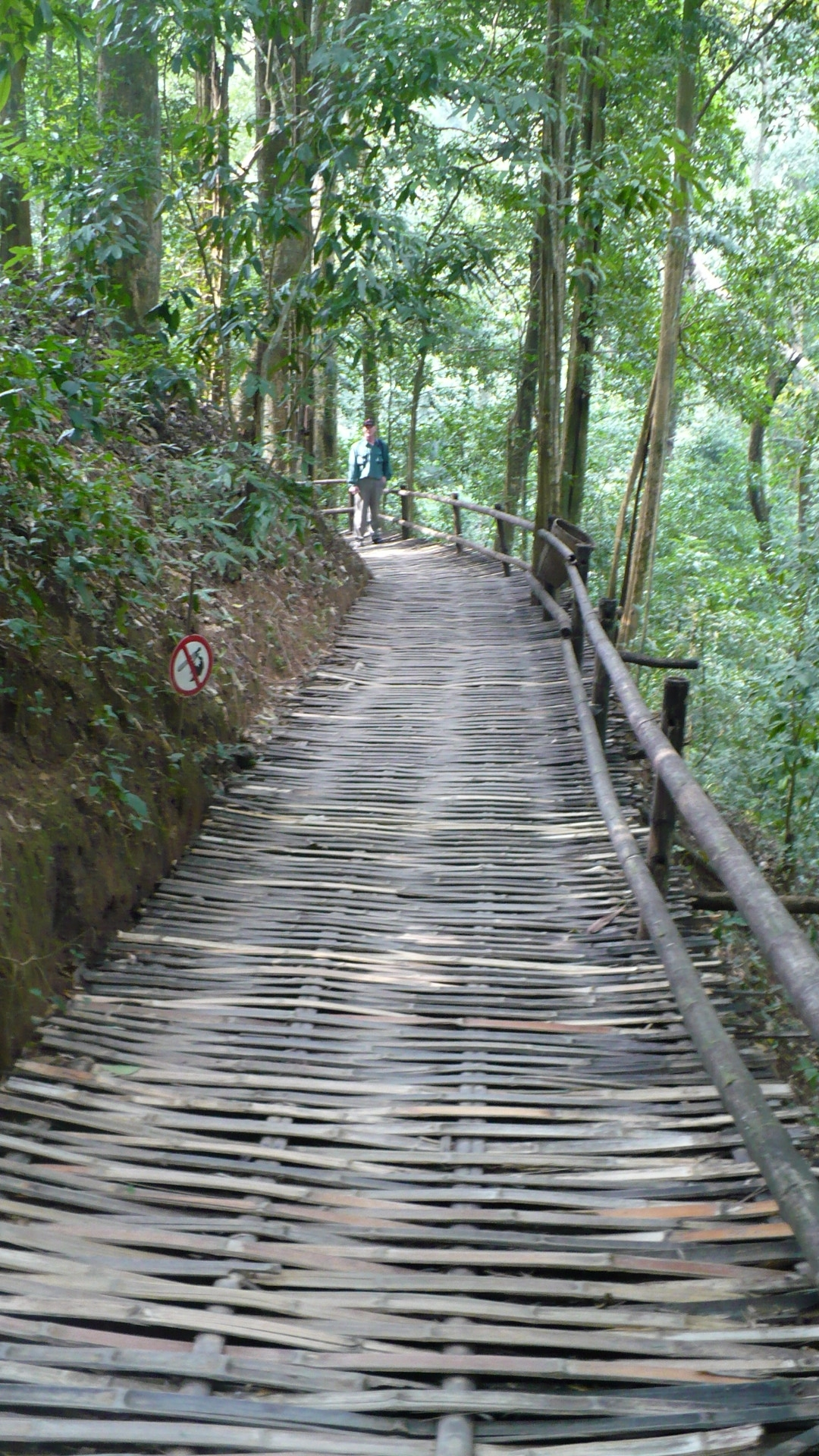
Xishuangbanna Primeval Forest Park

The flora of China consists of a diverse range of plant species including over 39,000 vascular plants, 27,000 species of fungi and 3000 species of bryophytes. More than 30,000 plant species are native to China, representing nearly one-eighth of the world's total plant species, including thousands found nowhere else on Earth. China's land, extending over 9.6 million km, contains a variety of ecosystems and climates for plants to grow in. Some of the main climates include shores, tropical and subtropical forests, deserts, elevated plateaus and mountains. The events of the continental drift and early Paleozoic Caledonian movement also play a part in creating climatic and geographical diversity resulting in high levels of endemic vascular flora. These landscapes provide different ecosystems and climates for plants to grow in, creating a wide variety of different flora spanning over not just China, but different parts of the world.

== Climate ==
Köppen climate types of China

Owing to tremendous differences in latitude, longitude, and altitude, the climate of China is extremely diverse, ranging from tropical in the far south to subarctic in the far north and alpine in the higher elevations of the Tibetan Plateau. Monsoon winds, caused by differences in the heat-absorbing capacity of the continent and the ocean, dominate the climate. During the summer, the East Asian monsoon carries warm and moist air from the south and delivers the vast majority of the annual precipitation in much of the country. Conversely, the Siberian anticyclone dominates during winter, bringing cold and comparatively dry conditions. The advance and retreat of the monsoons account in large degree for the timing of the rainy season throughout the country. Although most of the country lies in the temperate belt, its climatic patterns are complex.

The northern extremities of both Heilongjiang and Inner Mongolia have a subarctic climate; in contrast, most of Hainan Island and parts of the extreme southern fringes of Yunnan have a tropical climate. Temperature differences in winter are considerable, but in summer the variance is considerably less. For example, Mohe County, Heilongjiang has a 24-hour average temperature in January approaching −30 °C (−22 °F), while the corresponding figure in July exceeds 18 °C (64 °F). By contrast, most of Hainan has a January mean in excess of 17 °C (63 °F), while the July mean there is generally above 28 °C (82 °F).

Precipitation is almost invariably concentrated in the warmer months, though annual totals range from less than 20 millimetres (0.8 in) in northwestern Qinghai and the Turpan Depression of Xinjiang to easily exceeding 2,000 millimetres (79 in) in Guangdong, Guangxi, and Hainan. Only in some pockets of the Dzungaria region of Xinjiang is the conspicuous seasonal variation in precipitation that defines Chinese (and, to a large extent, East Asian) climate absent.

Annual sunshine duration ranges from less than 1,100 hours in parts of Sichuan and Chongqing to over 3,400 hours in northwestern Qinghai. Seasonal patterns in sunshine vary considerably by region, but overall, the north and the Tibetan Plateau are sunnier than the south of the country.

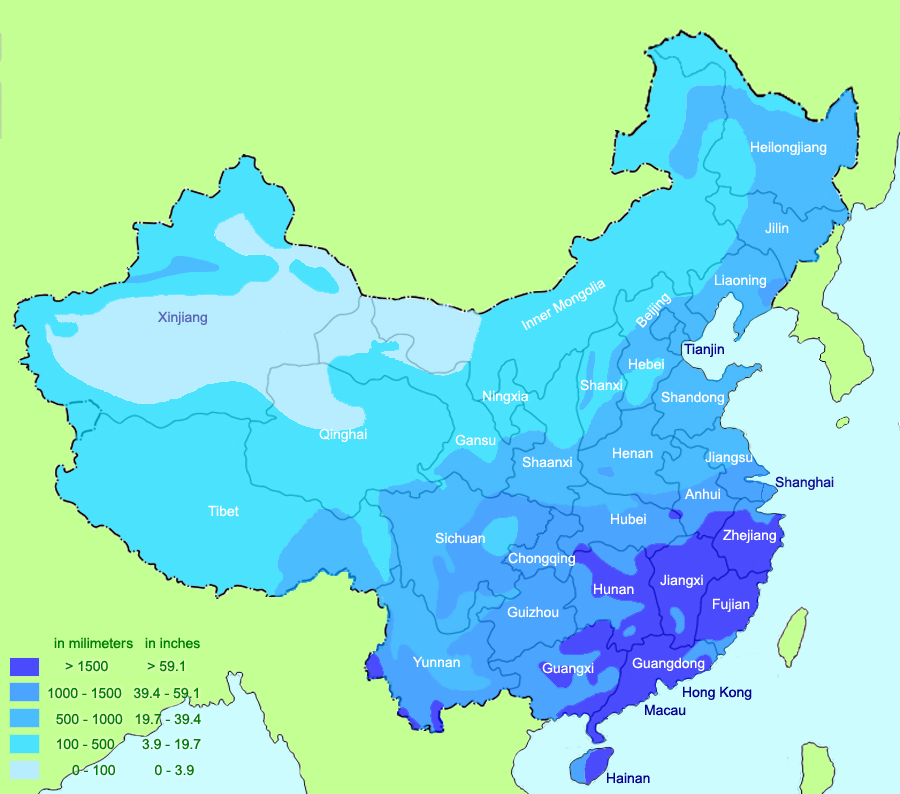
The average annual precipitation in China and Taiwan

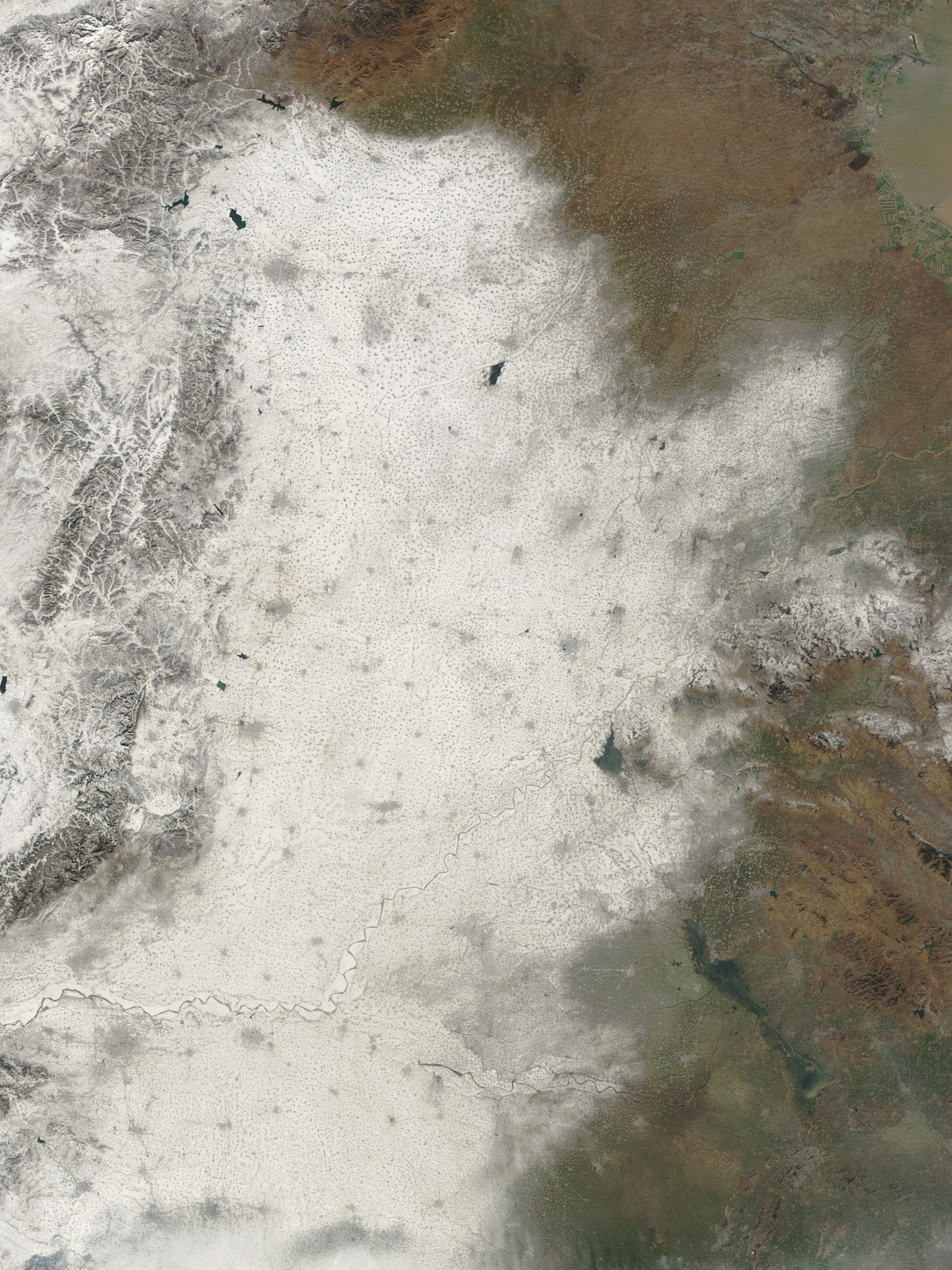
Early-season snow covering part of the North China Plain near Shijiazhuang, Hebei

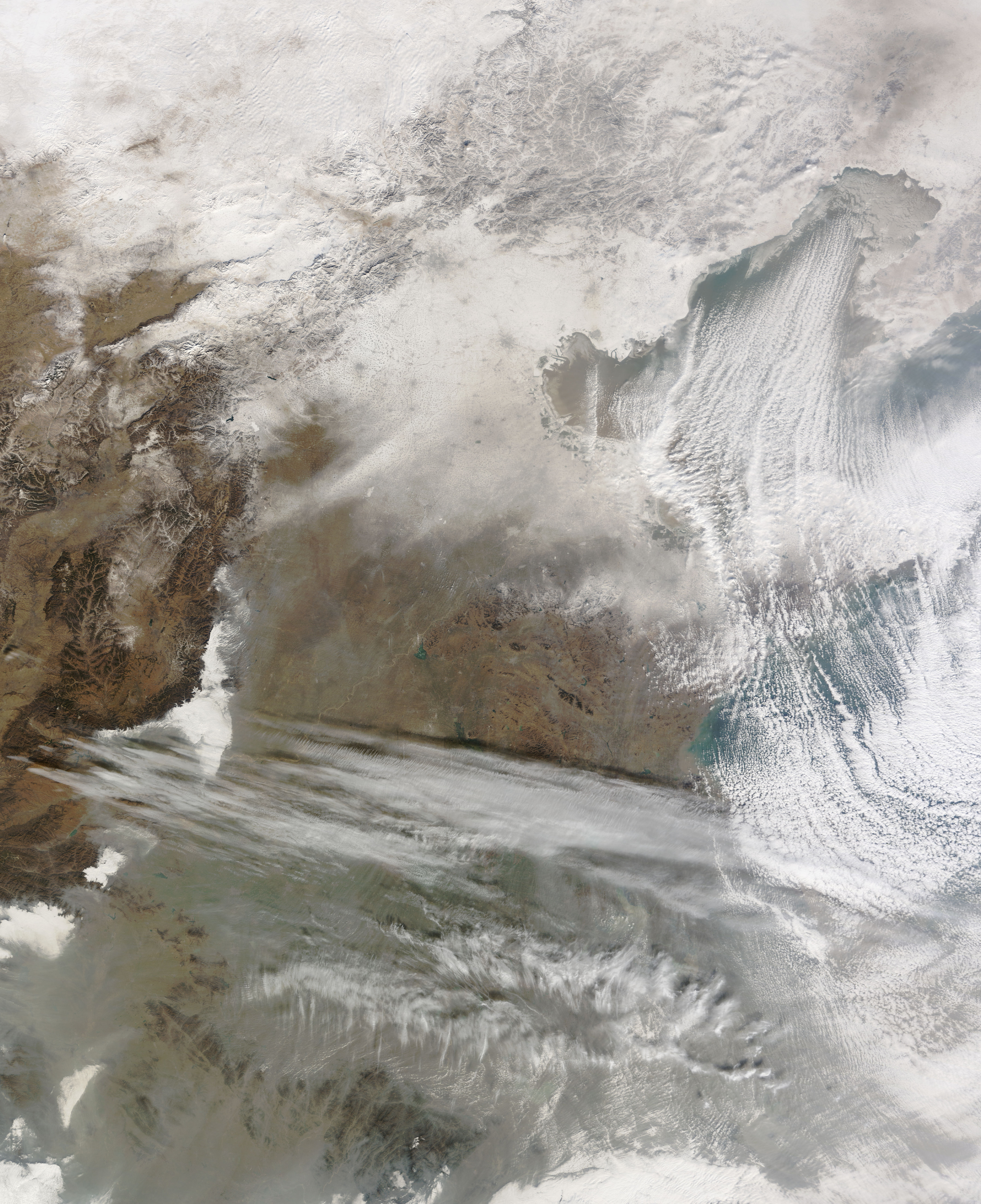
Snow encircling the area around the Bo Hai

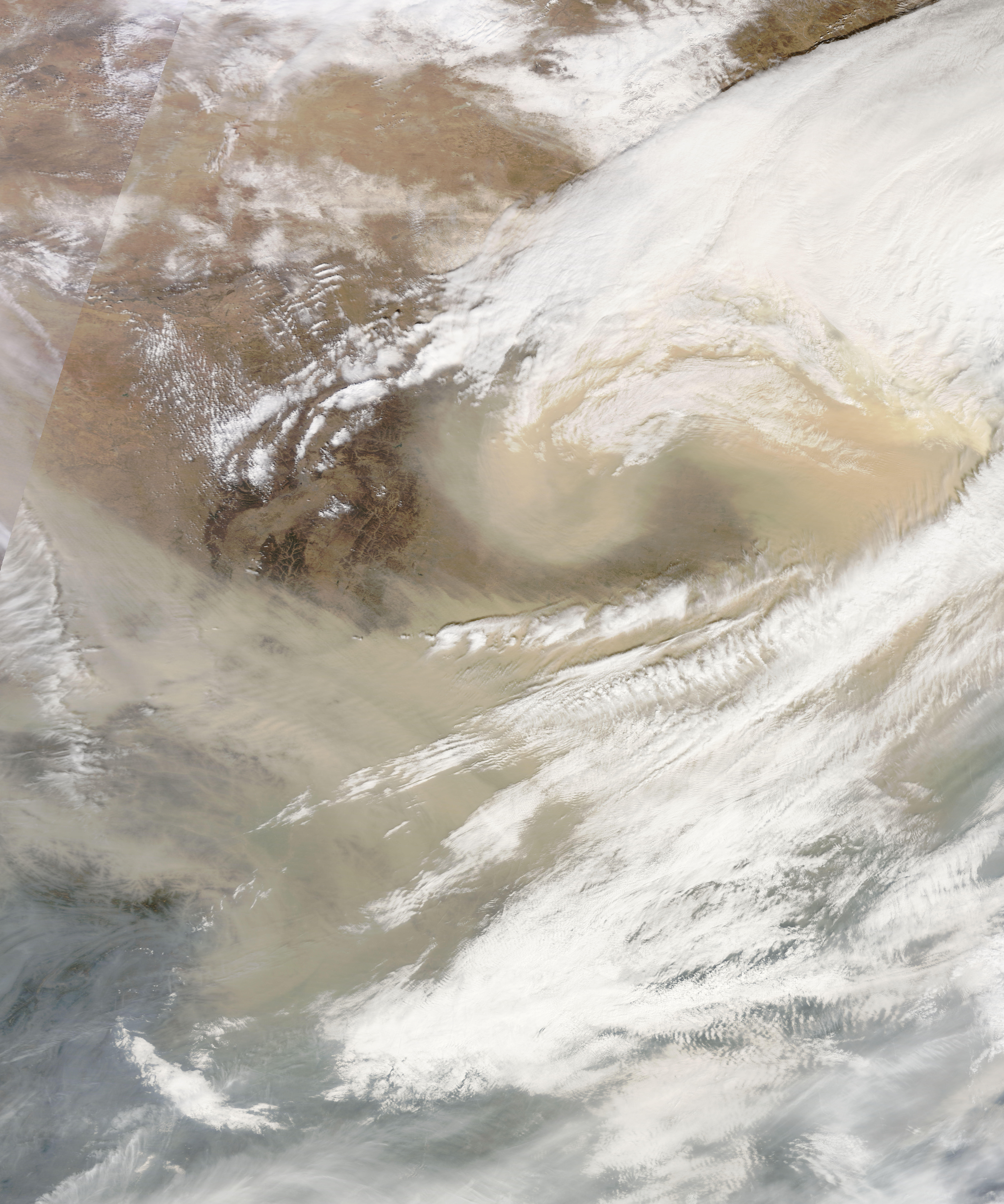
The first day of spring 2010 brought a massive sandstorm blowing from Inner Mongolia

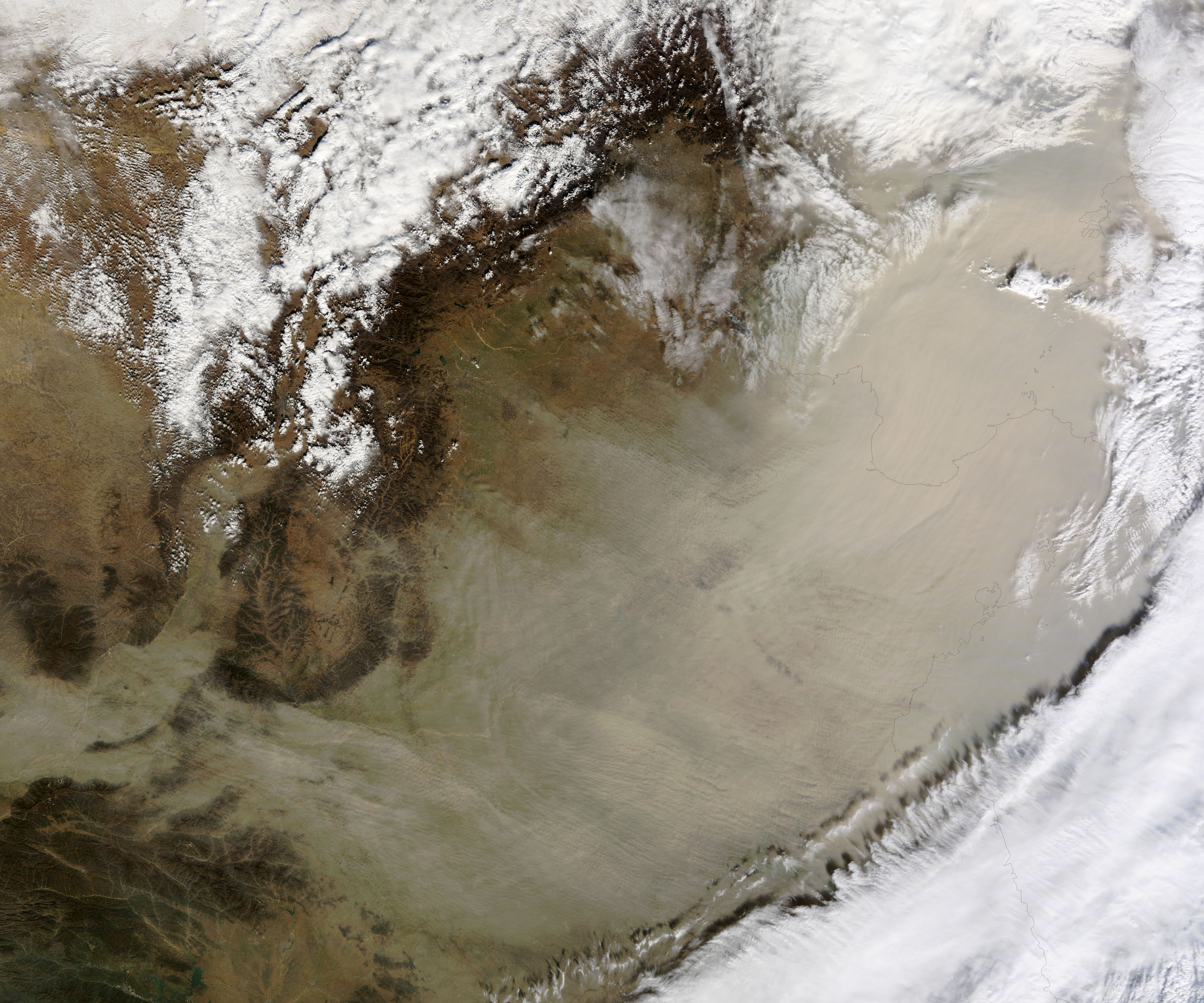
On November 11, 2010, a wall of sand blew across northern China, covering much of the North China Plain and Shandong Peninsula.

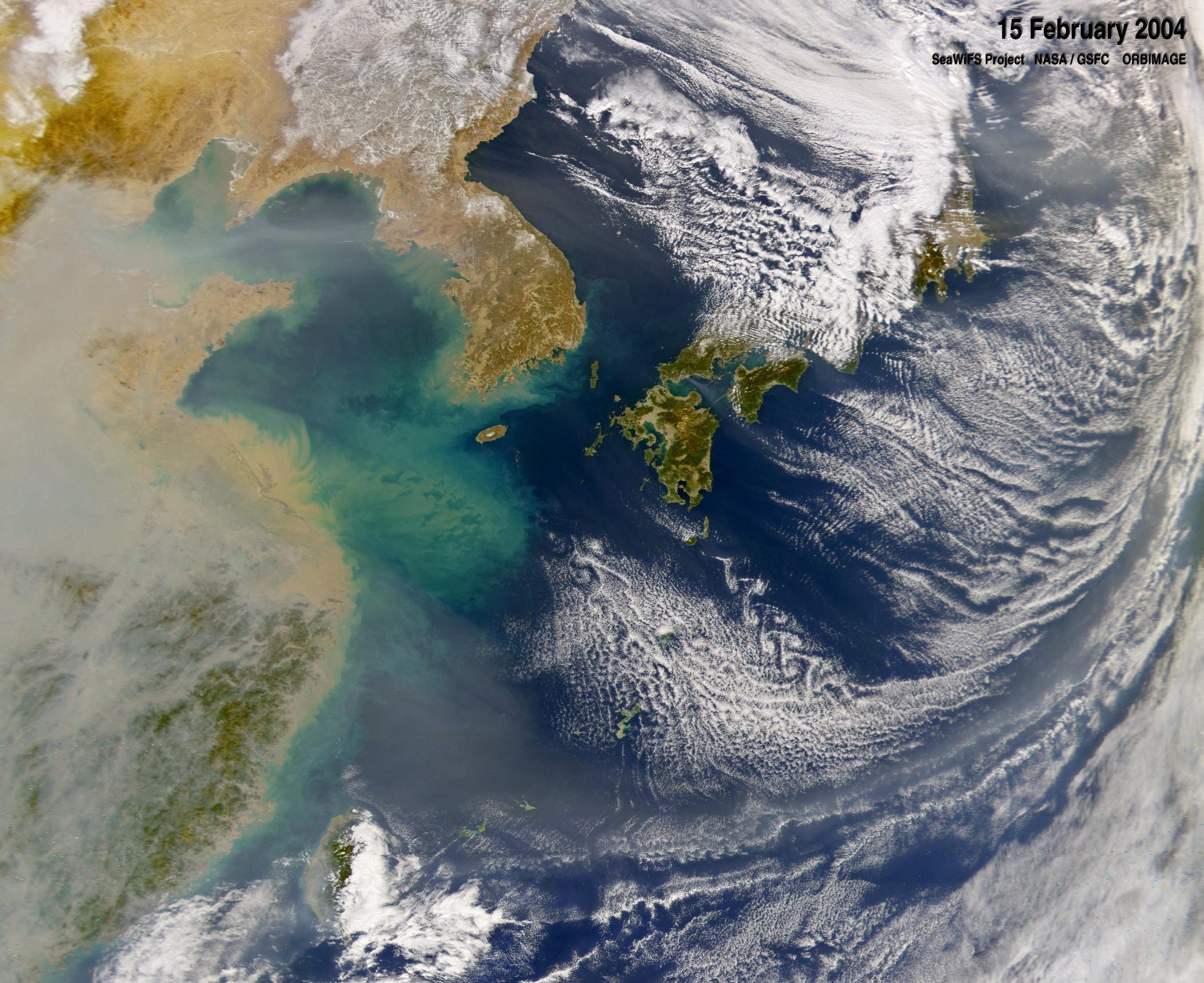
Smog from Eastern China spread over neighboring areas in February 2004.

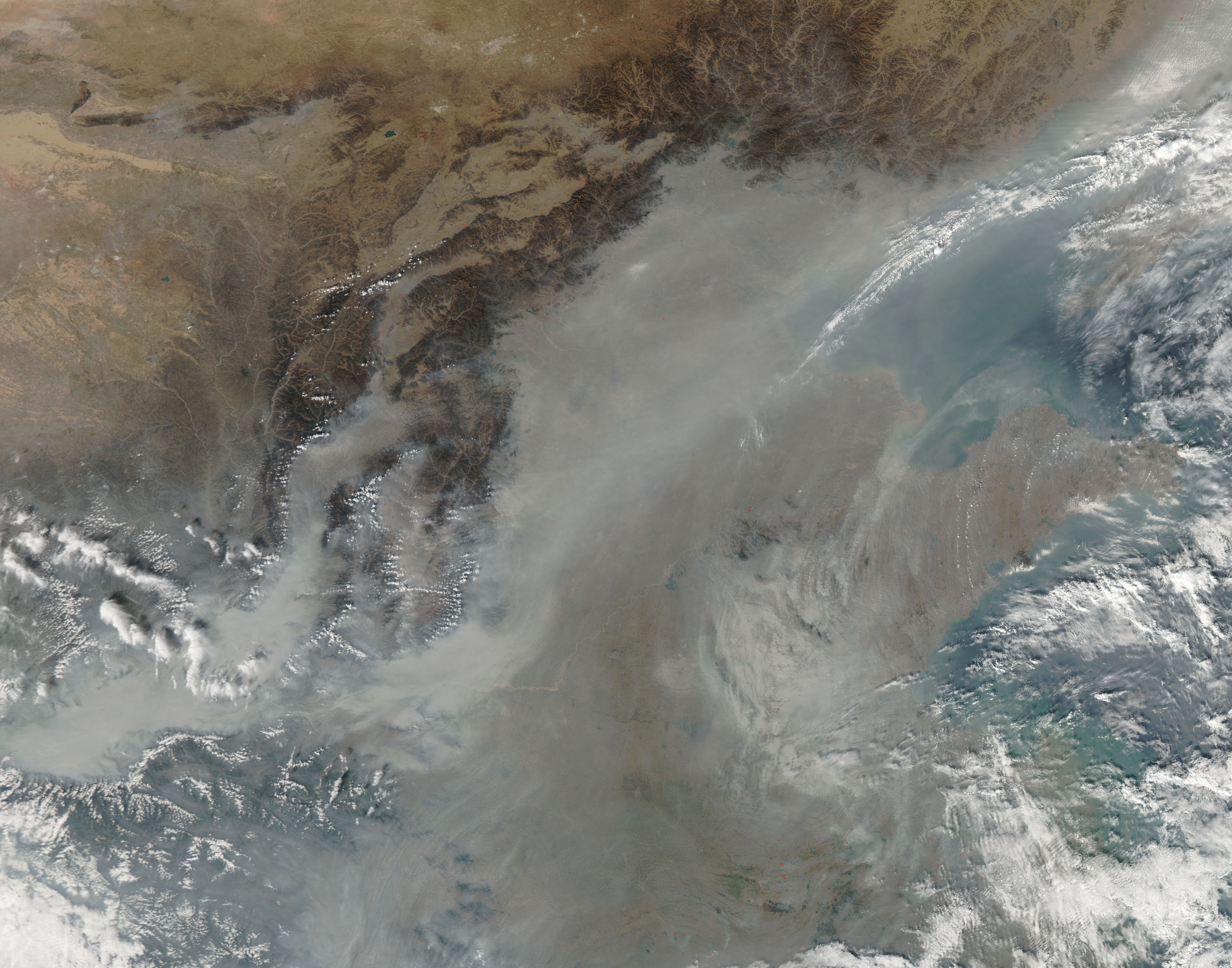
Haze over the North China Plain and the Lüliang Mountains of Shanxi

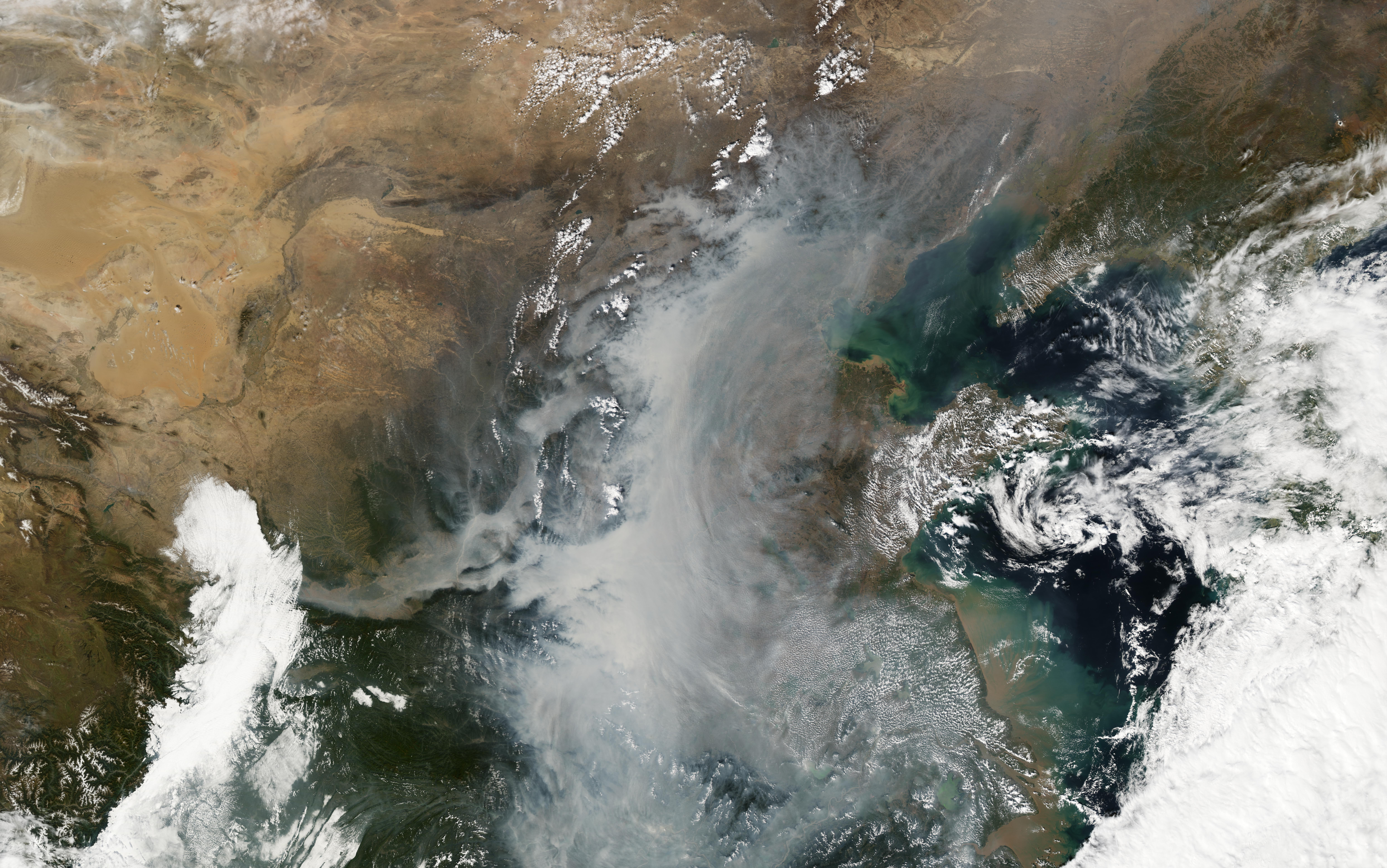
Natural color satellite image of a smog event in the heart of northern China

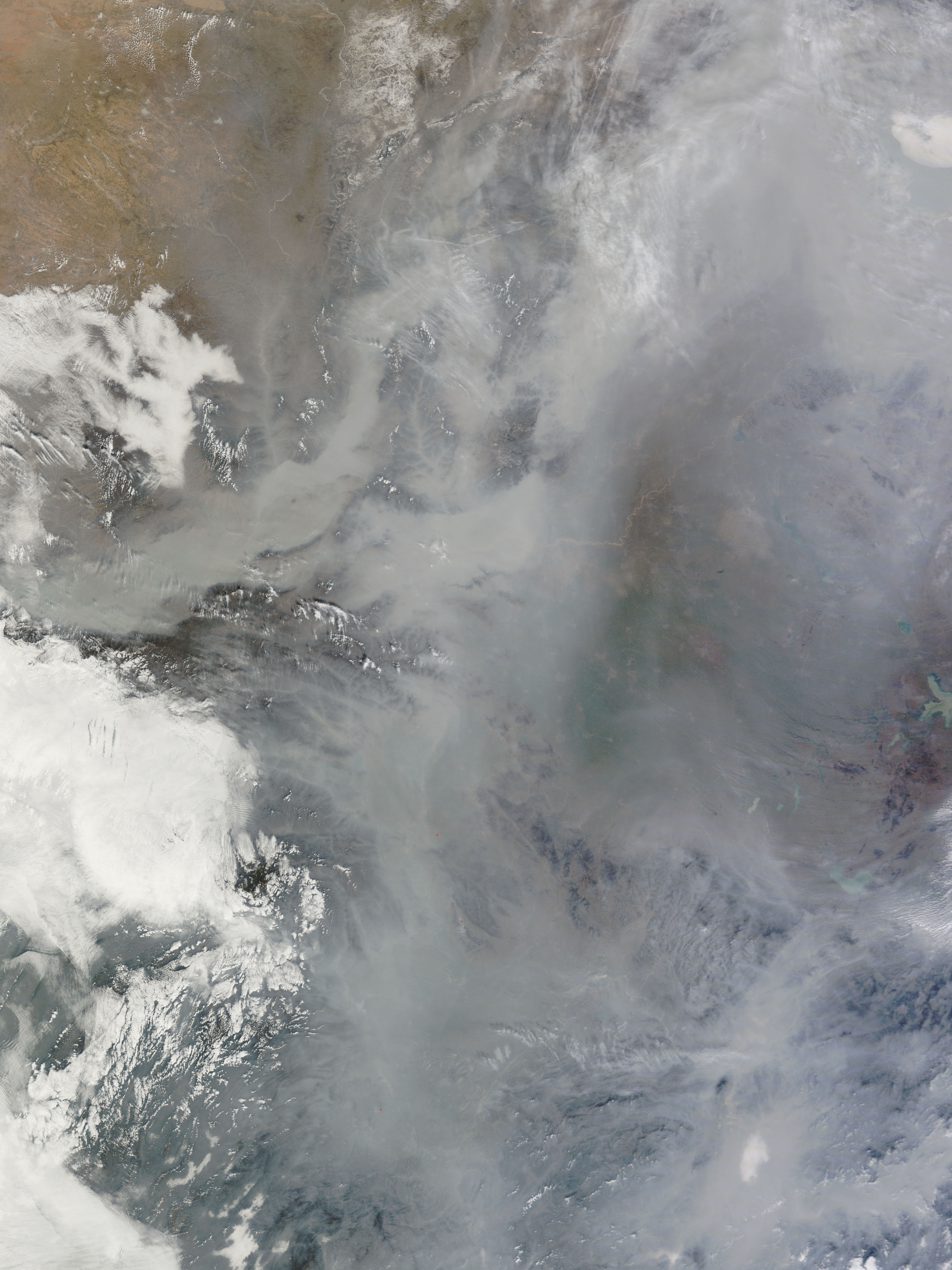
Dense smog settled over the North China Plain on February 20, 2011.

=== Climate change ===
Climate change is having major effects on the Chinese economy, society and the environment. The People's Republic of China is the world's largest emitter of carbon dioxide, through an energy infrastructure heavily focused on coal. China's per capita emissions are greater than the world and European Union averages but less than Australia, Canada, and the U.S. China recorded its hottest year on record in 2025, with an annual average temperature of 11.0 °C (51.8 °F). On the basis of cumulative CO_{2} emissions measured from 1751 through to 2017, China is responsible for 13% of global and about half of the United States' cumulative emissions. According to the Carbon Majors Database, Chinese state coal production alone accounts for 14% of historical global emissions.

A burgeoning construction industry and industrial manufacturing contribute heavily to carbon emissions. It has also been noted that higher-income countries have outsourced emissions-intensive industries to China.

China is suffering from the negative effects of global warming in agriculture, forestry and water resources, and is expected to continue to see increased impacts. China's government is taking some measures to increase renewable energy, and other decarbonization efforts, vowing to hit peak emissions before 2030 and be carbon neutral by 2060 by adopting "more vigorous policies and measures." In 2022, China's GHG emissions were expected to peak in 2025 and return to 2022 levels by 2030. However, such a pathway will still lead to a 3 degrees Celsius temperature rise.

== Protected areas of China ==
China has more than 10,000 protected areas, covering eighteen percent of the country's land. There are many forms of protected areas in China. Based on their relative importance, each type of protected area can be further graded into two to three levels (national, provincial and prefectural/county level). Nevertheless, the highest rank for "pocket nature preserve" (social and mass-based), "no-hunting area", "no-fishing area", "no-logging area", "wild medicinal material resources conservation area", "crop germplasm resources conservation area", "forest tree germplasm resources conservation area" or "source water protection area" is practically restricted to provincial level. The local government at county level is also responsible for the delimitation and declaration of "basic farmland protection area" and "basic grassland".

Many protected areas (PAs) in China have multiple official designations, and the statutory boundaries of these multi-designated PAs may be identical or may vary from one another. For instance, the boundaries of Huangshan NSHA coincide with those of the Huangshan NGP, whereas Fujian province's Wuyi Mountains NNR, NSHA and NFP are adjacent to each other. In Heilongjiang, 27,642.14 hectares out of 115,340.27 hectares of Huzhong NFP are intersected with the experiment zone of Huzhong NNR.

Following is a list of the protected areas designated by the State Council or its subordinated ministries, and the administrations under the ministries.

=== UNESCO World Heritage Sites ===
Within China's protected areas are some United Nations Educational, Scientific and Cultural Organization (UNESCO) World Heritage sites. According to the UNESCO World Heritage website, these sites are “designation for places on Earth that are of outstanding universal value to humanity and as such, have been inscribed on the World Heritage List to be protected for future generations to appreciate and enjoy.”

China alone has 59 sites, including, but not limited to: The Great Wall of China, The Imperial Palace, and The Temple of Heaven. These are cultural sites, and are protected because of their significant contributions to China's culture. Fifteen of these fifty nine sites, or 23.7% of these sites are categorized as “natural” sites, as opposed to “cultural” or “mixed” sites. These natural sites include famous rivers (Three Parallel Rivers of Yunnan), animal sanctuaries (Sichuan Giant Panda Sanctuary), and “historic and interest areas” (Jiuzhaigou Valley Scenic and Historic Interest Area). Fujian's Wuyi Mountains, as listed above, are categorized as “mixed.”

The UNESCO World Heritage Site list is always being updated, as countries can nominate additional sites to be included as a UNESCO World Heritage Site. As per the UNESCO page dedicated to the nominations process, the process requires countries to be signatories on the “World Heritage Convention, pledging to protect their natural and cultural heritage.” China has 59 additional sites that are on the “tentative list” as of March 2025. These sites include the natural reserves like the Dongzhai Port National Reserve and the Alligator Sinensis Nature Reserve, scenic zones like the Lijiang River Scenic Zone at Guilin, and historically relevant cultural relics like the City Walls of the Ming and Qing Dynasties.

UNESCO World Heritage also offers a “State of Conservation” section, in which any threats to these environments can be reported and monitored. More specifically: “The Information System offers you a trove of reliable data on the state of conservation of World Heritage properties since 1979 and the threats they have faced in the past, or are currently facing.” China has 28 properties that are listed under “concerned.” Many of the sites China has listed under “concerned” include threats of tourist impact, management systems, housing, and legal frameworks.

== Environmental issues ==
A factory in China at the Yangtze River

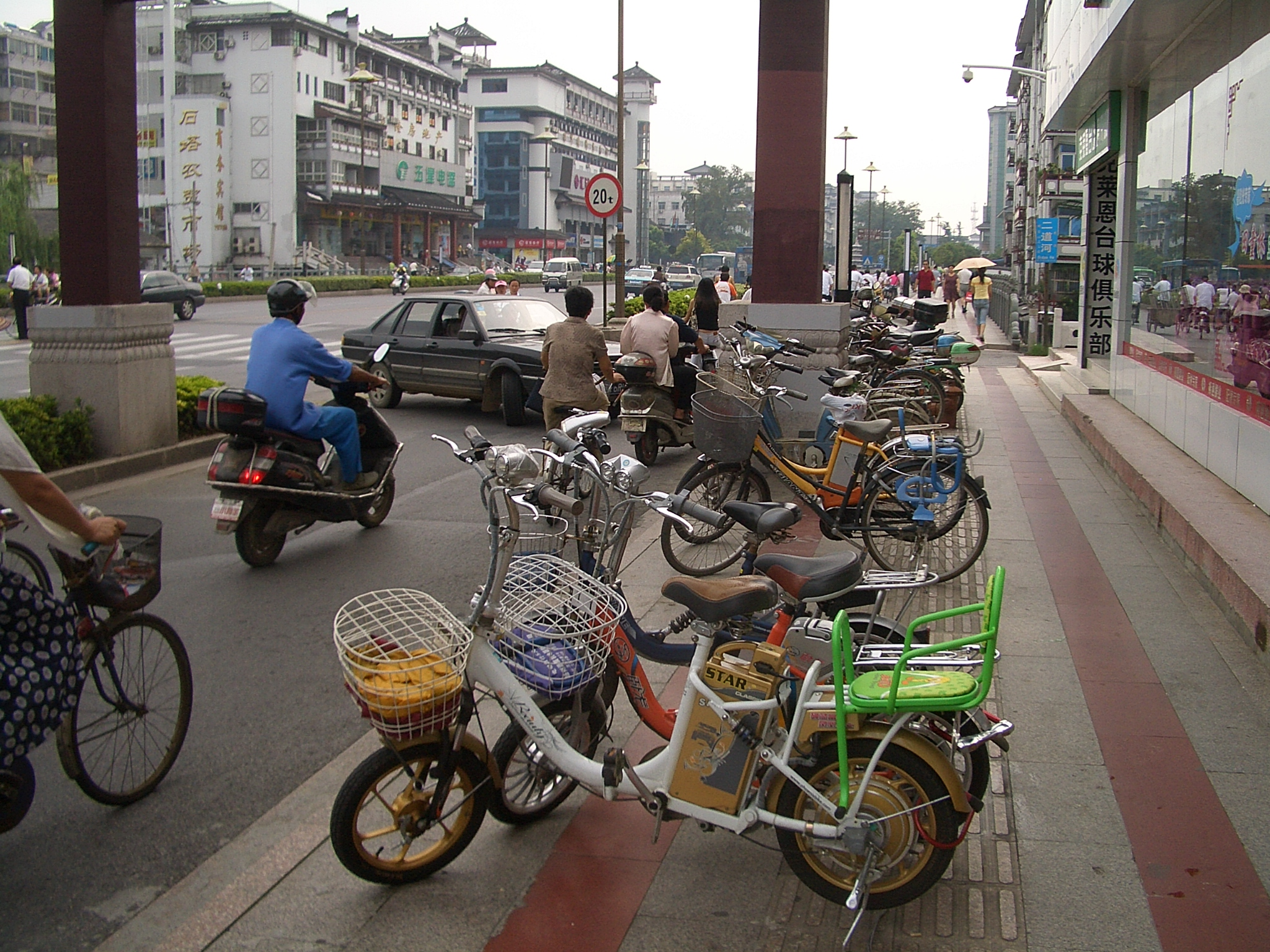
A large proportion of motor vehicles now sold in the cities of the Yangtze Delta are electric bicycles.

Rapid industrialization, population growth, and lax environmental oversight have caused many environmental issues, such as large-scale pollution in China.

According to Jared Diamond, the six main categories of environmental problems of China are: air pollution, water problems, soil problems, habitat destruction, biodiversity loss and mega projects. Diamond also states that, "China is noted for the frequency, number, extent, and damage of its natural disasters".

Studies show that particulate like PM10 and PM2.5 levels in China are among the highest in the world, which post significant public health risks. By analyzing 16 cities, Research found that a 10 g/m^{3} increase in PM10 was associated with a 0.35% rise in total mortality, a 0.44% increase in cardiovascular mortality, and a 0.56% increase in respiratory mortality. In January 2013, fine airborne particulates that pose the largest health risks, rose as high as 993 micrograms per cubic meter in Beijing, compared with World Health Organization guidelines of no more than 25. The World Bank estimates that 16 of the world's most-polluted cities are located in China. As of 2013, Beijing, which lies in a topographic bowl, has significant industry, and heats with coal, is subject to air inversions resulting in extremely high levels of pollution in winter months.

A study by Wenqi Wu use a difference-in-difference-in-difference model to analyze air pollution across 290 Chinese cities from 2007 to 2021. They found that joint regional pollution control measures significantly reduced PM2.5 and industrial sulfur dioxide emissions, particularly in the Yangtze River Delta and the Pearl River Delta. However, the Beijing-Tianjin-Hebei region showed less improvement, possibly due to economic disparities and governance challenges.

An effort made by the government aim to address this problem was the implementation of the Air Pollution Prevention and Control Action Plan (APPCAP), which was implement between 2014 and 2018. This policy led to significant improvements in Beijing's air quality, reducing key pollutants such as PM2.5, PM10, NO_{2}, SO_{2}, and CO. A study of 35 monitoring sites in Beijing found that PM2.5 levels declined significantly. It contribute to a 5.6% decrease in pollution-related mortality. However, during the same period, ozone (O3) levels increased. Additional policies such as the Best Available Control Technologies (BACT) and Advanced Coal Gasification Technologies (ACGT) have been proposed. Research suggest that implementing these policy could reduce pollution related health damages by 20–50%.

Public perception of air pollution in China remains a critical force in china Environmental policy. Many Chinese citizens have expressed concerns over whether air pollution is responsible for increasing lung cancer. This question began to rise because the citizens in China must constantly wear face masks to avoid breathing in the hazardous particles from their polluted skies. Some experts agree that it is the reason, but others say there isn't enough evidence. Wang Ning, deputy director of the Beijing Office for Prevention and Control, says he has seen a rise in a certain cancer called adenocarcinoma, which is a mucus that is seen as a side effect from pollution. China's lung cancer rate is 32% of the entire world's lung cancer patients. Meanwhile, as lung cancer increases, gastric, esophageal, and cervical cancer have all decreased in China. In particular, elderly, women, and individuals with lower education levels, are disproportionately affected. Regional disparities also highlight inequalities in environmental health as cities with higher baseline pollution levels tend to exhibit lower per-unit health impacts, possibly due to physiological adaptation, while cities with lower pollution levels with greater health effects per unit increase in pollution. A survey of Nanchang residents found that 69% believed air quality had deteriorated. They identify that motor vehicles, waste burning, and industrial facilities are the main contributors. The survey also suggested strong public demand for stricter regulations, with 96.8% of respondents supporting increased government investment in air pollution control.

== See also ==
- Environmental history of China
- Environmental policy in China
- Environmentalism in China
- Geographic Information Systems in China
- Hot summer cold winter zone
- Land use in China
