= China Pollution Map Database =

The China Pollution Map Database has been developed by the Institute of Public & Environmental Affairs (IPE), a registered non-profit organization based in Beijing, China, since its founding in May 2006. Its purpose is to monitor corporate environmental performance, pinpoint geographical locations of pollution sources and to act as an informational platform on regional pollution status, such as water and air quality, and pollutant discharge rankings. This publicly available information resource brings together over 97,000 environmental supervision records from government departments, at all levels and regions, throughout mainland China. These records, dating back as far as 2004, allow for the expansion of environmental information disclosure, enabling communities to fully understand the hazards and risks in the surrounding environment, thus promoting widespread public participation in environmental governance.

With the improvements made to the IPE website and thus China Pollution Map Database, over the last two years the number of official government-sourced violation records, from all regions in China, added to the China Pollution Map Database, has grown by over 40,000, each having its own particular circumstances and need for a prompt and effective resolution.

This important publicly available resource allows stakeholders, at all levels, to be informed, providing opportunities for individual and community inclusion, as well as NGO and media engagement. The IPE hopes this societal supervision of corporate and regional environmental performance and the external pressure on government will promote greater efforts towards enforcement and compliance, and in turn will provide a safer, cleaner and healthier environment for all.

When developing and updating the China Pollution Map Database, the IPE pays special attention to the annually published, government authored, List of Key State Monitored Enterprises, which according to set selection principles and methods, identifies those companies that occupy 65% of China's industrial discharge volume, in traditionally heavy polluting industries. Through research and field visits, the IPE aims to continue the geographical positioning of the location of these companies.

== See also ==
- Pollution in China
