= Climate of China =

National climate

Köppen climate types of mainland China

Owing to tremendous differences in latitude, longitude, and altitude, the climate of China is extremely diverse. It ranges from tropical or subtropical in the far south to subarctic in the far north, and alpine in the higher elevations of the Tibetan Plateau.

Each region has dominant weather events. During the summer, the East Asian monsoon carries warm and moist air from the south and delivers the vast majority of the annual precipitation in much of the country. Conversely, the Siberian anticyclone dominates during winter, bringing cold and comparatively dry conditions. The advance and retreat of the monsoons account, in large degree, for the timing of the rainy season throughout the country.

Access to weather is very geographically separated, with significant more rain in the South and South East, and drier regions on the interior of the country. These extremes are being amplified by multiple environmental issues. For example, agricultural and land use policies during the middle of the 20th century accelerated desertification in the Gobi Desert. Other environmental issues, such as climate change and pollution, are effecting large parts of the country, significantly altering landscapes and their climate.

== Conditions ==
=== Temperature ===
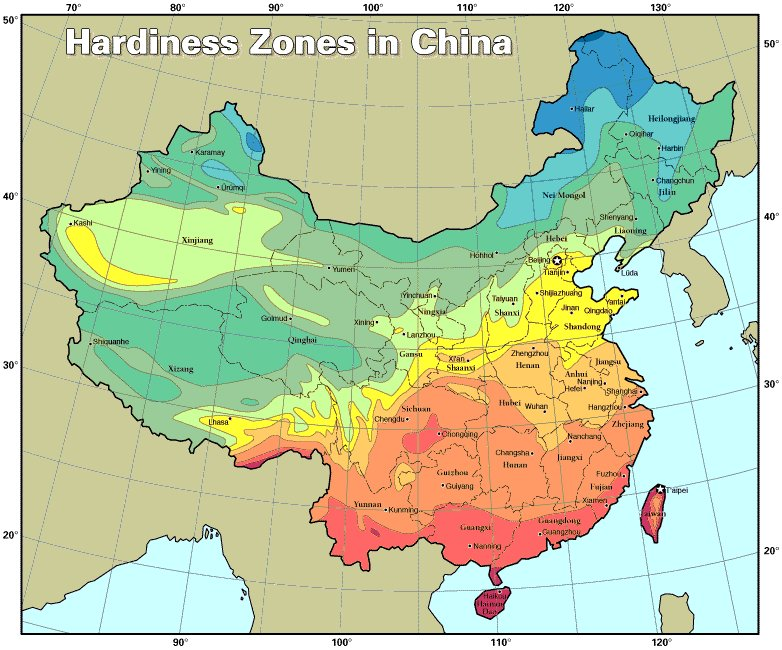
Hardiness zones in China

The northern extremities of both Heilongjiang and Inner Mongolia have a subarctic climate with long, severe winters, and short, warm summers. In contrast, most of Hainan Island and parts of the extreme southern fringes of Yunnan have a tropical climate although places like Guangdong and Fujian have a more subtropical climate. Temperature differences in winter are considerable, but in summer, the variance is considerably less. For example, Mohe County, Heilongjiang, has a 24-hour average temperature in January approaching −30 °C (−22 °F), while the corresponding figure in July exceeds 18 °C (64 °F). By contrast, most of Hainan, including the city of Haikou, has a January mean over 18 °C (64 °F), while the July mean there is generally around 29 °C (84 °F).

Sanbao Township in Xinjiang currently holds the highest recorded temperature in China, at 52.2 °C (126.0 °F) on 16 July 2023. Mohe City, Heilongjiang, holds the record for the lowest temperature in China, at −53.0 °C (−63.4 °F) on 22 January 2023.

In summer, temperatures can be very hot and humid, and the cities of Chongqing, Wuhan, and Nanjing are sometimes referred to as the Three Furnaces (simplified Chinese: 三大火炉; traditional Chinese: 三大火爐; pinyin: sān dà huǒlú). Other cities are also known by this name. Even so, the hottest temperatures nationwide are recorded in the Turpan Depression, where the climate is much drier and temperatures often exceed 40 °C (104 °F).

Permafrost can be found at high elevations in the Tibetan Plateau and the Tian Shan mountains, as well as other mountainous areas in Northern China.

=== Precipitation ===
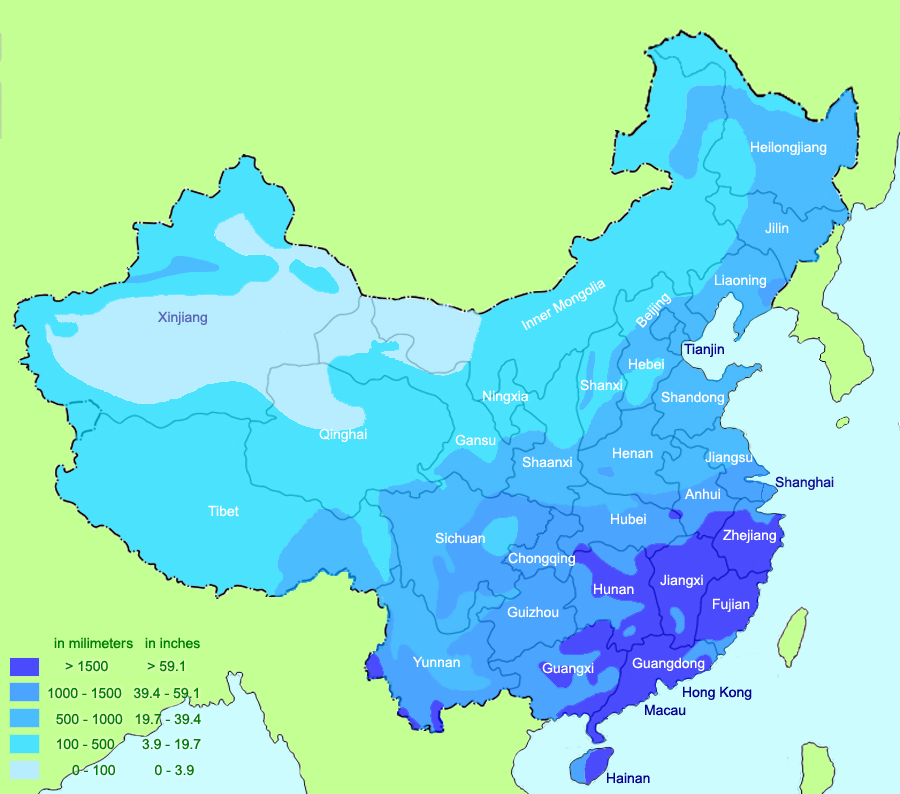
The average annual precipitation in Mainland China

In the winter, northern winds coming from high-latitude areas are cold and dry, while in summer, southern winds from coastal areas at lower latitudes are warm and moist. Precipitation is almost always concentrated in the warmer months, though annual totals range from less than 20 millimetres (0.8 in) in northwestern Qinghai and the Turpan Depression of Xinjiang, to over 2,000 millimetres (79 in) in areas of southeast China, such as Hong Kong and Guangdong. Toksun County, located in the Turpan Depression, has an average rainfall of just 3.9 mm (0.15 in) annually, the lowest precipitation in any area in China. High pressure cells create cold, dry conditions in the Gobi Desert in winter. Only in some pockets of the Dzungaria region of Xinjiang is the conspicuous seasonal variation in precipitation that defines Chinese (and, to a large extent, East Asian) climate absent. The East Asian monsoon, which controls the seasonal precipitation, varies from year to year. It has historically been known as the plum rain. Scientists have used pollen and dust to track its movements.

==== Typhoons and flooding ====
Typhoons can affect China. In 1975, Typhoon Nina struck China, and may have killed up to 230,000 people as a result of the subsequent Banqiao Dam failure and famines. Other death estimates remain below 100,000. In 2006, Typhoon Saomai became one of the strongest typhoons to hit China when it made landfall in Zhejiang. In 2013, Typhoon Haiyan caused extensive damage in China, causing economic losses of ¥4.58 billion (US$752 million). That same year, Typhoon Fitow became one of the costliest typhoons to strike China, with several places setting rainfall records. It was the costliest Chinese typhoon on record and caused several billion dollars in damage before it was beaten 10 years later by Typhoon Doksuri. In 2018, Typhoon Mangkhut caused $1.99 billion in damage within China. In 2021, Typhoon In-fa caused record-breaking rainfall in parts of China, and over 12,000 temporary shelters had to be set up in Zhejiang. In 2022, Typhoon Muifa became the strongest typhoon to landfall in Shanghai.

During the wet season, typhoons and heavy rainfall can cause rivers to flood. The 1931 China floods are considered to be the worst Chinese natural disaster of all time, with estimates of fatalities ranging widely but going up to as high as four million people. 15% of wheat and rice crops were destroyed in the Yangtze Valley, leading to famines. Almost 800,000 in Wuhan were left homeless after a dike failure in July 1931. The city was flooded under water for nearly three months. The city of Nanjing was also severely affected, and tens of thousands of people died in Gaoyou alone. Other major floods include the 1954 Yangtze River Floods, which killed around 30,000 people, the 1998 China floods, which caused significant damage and affected 180 million people, and the 2020 China floods, which caused US$32 billion in damage.

==== Tornadoes ====
Tornadoes occur frequently across China. Over 400 are recorded each year, with some reaching EF3 intensity. On 23 June 2016, a violent EF4 tornado ripped through the city of Yancheng in Jiangsu, killing 98 people and injuring 846, many of them critically. Tornadoes occur most frequently in the eastern regions of China, but activity is also prevalent in the southern and central regions.

=== Sunshine ===
Annual sunshine duration ranges from less than 1,000 hours in parts of Sichuan and Chongqing to over 3,000 hours in parts of Xinjiang and Qinghai, including Golmud. Some areas of Tibet, including Lhasa, are also sunny. Seasonal patterns in sunshine vary considerably by region, but overall, the north and the Tibetan Plateau are sunnier than the south of the country. In some cities in southern China, such as Hong Kong, spring is the cloudiest season and autumn is the sunniest.

== Environmental issues ==
Air pollution caused by industrial plants (a factory at the Yangtze River)

In 2020, China ranked 120th out of 180 countries in the Environmental Performance Index. The government has taken actions to mitigate environmental issues, but some media has criticized the actions as inadequate. China now ranks at 130th out of 180.

A major environmental issue in China is the continued expansion of its deserts, particularly the Gobi Desert. Although barrier tree lines planted since the 1970s have reduced the frequency of sandstorms, prolonged drought and poor agricultural practices have resulted in dust storms plaguing northern China each spring, which then spread to other parts of East Asia, including Japan and Korea. China's environmental watchdog, SEPA, stated in 2007 that China is losing 4,000 km^{2} (1,500 sq mi) per year to desertification. Water quality, erosion, and pollution control have become important issues in China's relations with other countries. Melting glaciers in the Himalayas could potentially lead to water shortages for hundreds of millions of people. According to academics, in order to limit climate change in China to 1.5 °C (2.7 °F), electricity generation from coal in China without carbon capture must be phased out by 2045. Official government statistics about Chinese agricultural productivity are considered unreliable, due to exaggeration of production at subsidiary government levels.

Much of China has a climate very suitable for agriculture and the country has been the world's largest producer of rice, wheat, tomatoes, eggplant, grapes, watermelon, spinach, and many other crops.

=== Climate change ===
Climate change is having major effects on the Chinese economy, society and the environment. The People's Republic of China is the world's largest emitter of carbon dioxide, through an energy infrastructure heavily focused on coal. China's per capita emissions are greater than the world and European Union averages but less than Australia, Canada, and the U.S. China recorded its hottest year on record in 2025, with an annual average temperature of 11.0 °C (51.8 °F). On the basis of cumulative CO_{2} emissions measured from 1751 through to 2017, China is responsible for 13% of global and about half of the United States' cumulative emissions. According to the Carbon Majors Database, Chinese state coal production alone accounts for 14% of historical global emissions.

A burgeoning construction industry and industrial manufacturing contribute heavily to carbon emissions. It has also been noted that higher-income countries have outsourced emissions-intensive industries to China.

China is suffering from the negative effects of global warming in agriculture, forestry and water resources, and is expected to continue to see increased impacts. China's government is taking some measures to increase renewable energy, and other decarbonization efforts, vowing to hit peak emissions before 2030 and be carbon neutral by 2060 by adopting "more vigorous policies and measures." In 2022, China's GHG emissions were expected to peak in 2025 and return to 2022 levels by 2030. However, such a pathway will still lead to a 3 degrees Celsius temperature rise.

== Regional differences ==
=== Northeast China ===
Climate data for Beijing, elevation 31 m (102 ft), (1991–2020 normals, extremes 1951–present)
Month	Jan	Feb	Mar	Apr	May	Jun	Jul	Aug	Sep	Oct	Nov	Dec	Year
Record high °C (°F)	14.3 (57.7)	25.6 (78.1)	29.5 (85.1)	33.5 (92.3)	41.1 (106.0)	41.1 (106.0)	41.9 (107.4)	38.3 (100.9)	35.9 (96.6)	31.0 (87.8)	23.3 (73.9)	19.5 (67.1)	41.9 (107.4)
Mean daily maximum °C (°F)	2.3 (36.1)	6.1 (43.0)	13.2 (55.8)	21.0 (69.8)	27.2 (81.0)	30.8 (87.4)	31.8 (89.2)	30.7 (87.3)	26.5 (79.7)	19.3 (66.7)	10.3 (50.5)	3.7 (38.7)	18.6 (65.4)
Daily mean °C (°F)	−2.7 (27.1)	0.6 (33.1)	7.5 (45.5)	15.1 (59.2)	21.3 (70.3)	25.3 (77.5)	27.2 (81.0)	26.1 (79.0)	21.2 (70.2)	13.8 (56.8)	5.2 (41.4)	−1.0 (30.2)	13.3 (55.9)
Mean daily minimum °C (°F)	−6.9 (19.6)	−4.2 (24.4)	1.9 (35.4)	9.0 (48.2)	15.1 (59.2)	20.0 (68.0)	23.0 (73.4)	22.0 (71.6)	16.3 (61.3)	8.8 (47.8)	0.7 (33.3)	−5.0 (23.0)	8.4 (47.1)
Record low °C (°F)	−22.8 (−9.0)	−27.4 (−17.3)	−15 (5)	−3.2 (26.2)	2.5 (36.5)	9.8 (49.6)	15.3 (59.5)	11.4 (52.5)	3.7 (38.7)	−3.5 (25.7)	−12.3 (9.9)	−18.3 (−0.9)	−27.4 (−17.3)
Average precipitation mm (inches)	2.2 (0.09)	5.8 (0.23)	8.6 (0.34)	21.7 (0.85)	36.1 (1.42)	72.4 (2.85)	169.7 (6.68)	113.4 (4.46)	53.7 (2.11)	28.7 (1.13)	13.5 (0.53)	2.2 (0.09)	528 (20.78)
Average precipitation days (≥ 0.1 mm)	1.6	2.3	3.0	4.7	6.0	10.0	11.9	10.5	7.1	5.2	2.9	1.6	66.8
Average snowy days	2.8	2.5	1.3	0.1	0.0	0.0	0.0	0.0	0.0	0.0	1.7	2.8	11.2
Average relative humidity (%)	43	42	40	43	47	58	69	71	64	58	54	46	53
Mean monthly sunshine hours	188.1	189.1	231.1	243.2	265.1	221.6	190.5	205.3	206.1	199.9	173.4	177.1	2,490.5
Percentage possible sunshine	62	62	62	61	59	50	42	49	56	59	59	61	57
Average ultraviolet index	2	3	4	6	8	9	9	8	6	4	2	1	5
Source 1: China Meteorological Administration
Source 2: Extremes (Note: All-time record high; February record high; May record high; June record high) and Weather Atlas

==== Note ====
Climate data for Tianjin (Dongli District) (1991–2020 normals, extremes 1951-present)
Month	Jan	Feb	Mar	Apr	May	Jun	Jul	Aug	Sep	Oct	Nov	Dec	Year
Record high °C (°F)	14.3 (57.7)	20.8 (69.4)	30.5 (86.9)	33.1 (91.6)	40.5 (104.9)	40.6 (105.1)	40.5 (104.9)	37.4 (99.3)	34.9 (94.8)	30.8 (87.4)	23.1 (73.6)	14.4 (57.9)	40.6 (105.1)
Mean daily maximum °C (°F)	2.1 (35.8)	5.8 (42.4)	12.8 (55.0)	20.8 (69.4)	26.8 (80.2)	30.2 (86.4)	31.6 (88.9)	30.7 (87.3)	26.9 (80.4)	19.8 (67.6)	10.7 (51.3)	3.7 (38.7)	18.5 (65.3)
Daily mean °C (°F)	−2.8 (27.0)	0.4 (32.7)	7.0 (44.6)	14.8 (58.6)	21.0 (69.8)	25.0 (77.0)	27.2 (81.0)	26.3 (79.3)	21.7 (71.1)	14.3 (57.7)	5.7 (42.3)	−0.9 (30.4)	13.3 (56.0)
Mean daily minimum °C (°F)	−6.5 (20.3)	−3.7 (25.3)	2.4 (36.3)	9.6 (49.3)	15.8 (60.4)	20.6 (69.1)	23.6 (74.5)	22.7 (72.9)	17.4 (63.3)	9.9 (49.8)	1.8 (35.2)	−4.3 (24.3)	9.1 (48.4)
Record low °C (°F)	−18.1 (−0.6)	−22.9 (−9.2)	−17.7 (0.1)	−2.8 (27.0)	4.5 (40.1)	10.1 (50.2)	16.2 (61.2)	13.7 (56.7)	6.2 (43.2)	−2.2 (28.0)	−11.7 (10.9)	−17.9 (−0.2)	−22.9 (−9.2)
Average precipitation mm (inches)	2.6 (0.10)	6.0 (0.24)	6.1 (0.24)	22.8 (0.90)	37.7 (1.48)	78.0 (3.07)	141.2 (5.56)	122.3 (4.81)	54.8 (2.16)	32.8 (1.29)	13.5 (0.53)	3.1 (0.12)	520.9 (20.5)
Average precipitation days (≥ 0.1 mm)	1.3	2.3	2.5	4.5	6.2	9.0	11.1	9.8	6.4	4.8	3.0	2.0	62.9
Average relative humidity (%)	54	54	49	48	53	64	73	75	67	62	60	56	60
Mean monthly sunshine hours	167.6	175.9	227.7	243.8	267.8	233.9	202.2	203.3	212.3	199.8	165.2	160.9	2,460.4
Percentage possible sunshine	55	58	61	61	60	53	45	49	58	59	55	55	56
Source: China Meteorological Administration

Climate data for Shenyang (1991–2020 normals, extremes 1905–present)
Month	Jan	Feb	Mar	Apr	May	Jun	Jul	Aug	Sep	Oct	Nov	Dec	Year
Record high °C (°F)	8.6 (47.5)	17.2 (63.0)	22.6 (72.7)	30.0 (86.0)	35.7 (96.3)	39.3 (102.7)	38.3 (100.9)	38.4 (101.1)	32.9 (91.2)	29.4 (84.9)	21.7 (71.1)	14.1 (57.4)	39.3 (102.7)
Mean daily maximum °C (°F)	−4.8 (23.4)	0.1 (32.2)	7.5 (45.5)	17.1 (62.8)	23.9 (75.0)	27.6 (81.7)	29.5 (85.1)	28.8 (83.8)	24.4 (75.9)	16.3 (61.3)	5.8 (42.4)	−2.5 (27.5)	14.5 (58.0)
Daily mean °C (°F)	−11.4 (11.5)	−6.3 (20.7)	1.7 (35.1)	10.8 (51.4)	17.8 (64.0)	22.3 (72.1)	24.9 (76.8)	23.8 (74.8)	17.9 (64.2)	9.8 (49.6)	0.3 (32.5)	−8.4 (16.9)	8.6 (47.5)
Mean daily minimum °C (°F)	−17.0 (1.4)	−12.0 (10.4)	−3.9 (25.0)	4.3 (39.7)	11.5 (52.7)	16.9 (62.4)	20.6 (69.1)	19.4 (66.9)	12.1 (53.8)	4.0 (39.2)	−4.7 (23.5)	−13.5 (7.7)	3.1 (37.7)
Record low °C (°F)	−33.1 (−27.6)	−28.4 (−19.1)	−25.0 (−13.0)	−12.8 (9.0)	0.2 (32.4)	3.9 (39.0)	12.0 (53.6)	5.7 (42.3)	−2.6 (27.3)	−8.3 (17.1)	−22.8 (−9.0)	−30.2 (−22.4)	−33.1 (−27.6)
Average precipitation mm (inches)	6.0 (0.24)	9.7 (0.38)	16.7 (0.66)	35.2 (1.39)	63.6 (2.50)	92.5 (3.64)	167.0 (6.57)	167.1 (6.58)	50.8 (2.00)	44.1 (1.74)	22.8 (0.90)	12.0 (0.47)	687.5 (27.07)
Average precipitation days (≥ 0.1 mm)	3.7	3.4	4.8	6.6	9.0	11.7	12.2	10.6	6.5	7.0	5.8	4.8	86.1
Average snowy days	4.8	4.5	4.3	1.1	0	0	0	0	0	0.6	4.3	5.8	25.4
Average relative humidity (%)	63	57	52	49	54	67	77	79	72	66	63	64	64
Mean monthly sunshine hours	172.4	192.0	227.3	228.7	250.3	218.4	191.8	204.3	219.9	204.8	158.5	153.0	2,421.4
Percentage possible sunshine	58	64	61	57	55	48	42	48	59	60	54	54	55
Source: China Meteorological Administration all-time extreme temperature

Climate data for Harbin (1981–2010 normals, extremes 1961–2000)
Month	Jan	Feb	Mar	Apr	May	Jun	Jul	Aug	Sep	Oct	Nov	Dec	Year
Record high °C (°F)	4.2 (39.6)	9.9 (49.8)	20.7 (69.3)	29.4 (84.9)	34.6 (94.3)	36.7 (98.1)	39.2 (102.6)	35.6 (96.1)	31.0 (87.8)	26.5 (79.7)	17.2 (63.0)	8.5 (47.3)	39.2 (102.6)
Mean daily maximum °C (°F)	−12.0 (10.4)	−6.3 (20.7)	2.8 (37.0)	14.0 (57.2)	21.5 (70.7)	26.5 (79.7)	27.8 (82.0)	26.5 (79.7)	21.2 (70.2)	12.3 (54.1)	−0.1 (31.8)	−9.2 (15.4)	10.4 (50.7)
Daily mean °C (°F)	−17.6 (0.3)	−12.4 (9.7)	−2.8 (27.0)	7.8 (46.0)	15.3 (59.5)	21.0 (69.8)	23.1 (73.6)	21.6 (70.9)	15.1 (59.2)	6.4 (43.5)	−4.9 (23.2)	−14.3 (6.3)	4.9 (40.7)
Mean daily minimum °C (°F)	−22.9 (−9.2)	−18.3 (−0.9)	−8.5 (16.7)	1.4 (34.5)	8.8 (47.8)	15.2 (59.4)	18.6 (65.5)	16.9 (62.4)	9.3 (48.7)	0.9 (33.6)	−9.5 (14.9)	−19.0 (−2.2)	−0.6 (30.9)
Record low °C (°F)	−38.1 (−36.6)	−33.7 (−28.7)	−28.4 (−19.1)	−12.8 (9.0)	−3.8 (25.2)	4.6 (40.3)	9.5 (49.1)	6.6 (43.9)	−4.8 (23.4)	−16.2 (2.8)	−26.5 (−15.7)	−35.7 (−32.3)	−42.6 (−44.7)
Average precipitation mm (inches)	4.2 (0.17)	4.9 (0.19)	11.9 (0.47)	20.1 (0.79)	39.3 (1.55)	88.2 (3.47)	147.8 (5.82)	122.6 (4.83)	56.3 (2.22)	23.0 (0.91)	12.7 (0.50)	6.9 (0.27)	537.9 (21.19)
Average precipitation days (≥ 0.1 mm)	5.8	5.7	5.7	6.7	10.3	13.5	14.2	12.3	9.9	7.1	6.0	7.2	104.4
Average relative humidity (%)	71	66	55	48	51	62	76	78	69	61	63	69	64
Mean monthly sunshine hours	155.9	179.9	230.9	231.4	264.1	260.2	254.2	247.2	230.5	206.8	170.2	139.9	2,571.2
Percentage possible sunshine	56	62	63	57	58	56	54	57	61	61	60	52	58
Average ultraviolet index	1	2	3	4	6	7	8	7	5	3	1	1	4
Source 1: China Meteorological Administration (sunshine data 1971–2000), Weather China (precipitation days 1971–2000)
Source 2: Weather Atlas

=== Northwest China and Tibet ===
Climate data for Lanzhou, elevation 1,517 m (4,977 ft), (1991–2020 normals, extremes 1951–present)
Month	Jan	Feb	Mar	Apr	May	Jun	Jul	Aug	Sep	Oct	Nov	Dec	Year
Record high °C (°F)	17.1 (62.8)	21.0 (69.8)	26.0 (78.8)	34.6 (94.3)	35.5 (95.9)	36.8 (98.2)	39.8 (103.6)	37.3 (99.1)	34.4 (93.9)	30.5 (86.9)	20.3 (68.5)	16.5 (61.7)	39.8 (103.6)
Mean daily maximum °C (°F)	2.3 (36.1)	7.6 (45.7)	14.1 (57.4)	20.7 (69.3)	24.9 (76.8)	28.6 (83.5)	30.2 (86.4)	28.8 (83.8)	23.6 (74.5)	17.5 (63.5)	10.3 (50.5)	3.5 (38.3)	17.7 (63.8)
Daily mean °C (°F)	−4.1 (24.6)	0.6 (33.1)	7.0 (44.6)	13.2 (55.8)	17.7 (63.9)	21.7 (71.1)	23.4 (74.1)	22.2 (72.0)	17.2 (63.0)	10.7 (51.3)	3.5 (38.3)	−2.9 (26.8)	10.9 (51.5)
Mean daily minimum °C (°F)	−8.4 (16.9)	−4.3 (24.3)	1.6 (34.9)	7.2 (45.0)	11.5 (52.7)	15.8 (60.4)	17.9 (64.2)	16.9 (62.4)	12.6 (54.7)	6.1 (43.0)	−0.9 (30.4)	−7.0 (19.4)	5.7 (42.4)
Record low °C (°F)	−21.1 (−6.0)	−17.6 (0.3)	−11.6 (11.1)	−5.7 (21.7)	−0.1 (31.8)	5.7 (42.3)	9.8 (49.6)	8.6 (47.5)	1.6 (34.9)	−7.1 (19.2)	−12.3 (9.9)	−19.7 (−3.5)	−21.1 (−6.0)
Average precipitation mm (inches)	1.7 (0.07)	3.0 (0.12)	6.7 (0.26)	16.3 (0.64)	39.0 (1.54)	44.0 (1.73)	63.5 (2.50)	66.0 (2.60)	43.7 (1.72)	21.7 (0.85)	2.7 (0.11)	0.7 (0.03)	309 (12.17)
Average precipitation days (≥ 0.1 mm)	2.4	2.4	3.7	5.8	7.8	8.9	10.7	10.1	9.9	6.5	2.1	1.0	71.3
Average snowy days	4.9	4.4	3.3	0.9	0.1	0	0	0	0	1.0	3.1	2.9	20.6
Average relative humidity (%)	51	46	42	40	44	48	55	58	63	63	58	54	52
Mean monthly sunshine hours	149.7	173.1	210.3	226.0	245.1	234.0	239.6	226.6	173.2	173.6	155.5	143.1	2,349.8
Percentage possible sunshine	48	56	56	57	56	54	54	55	47	51	51	48	53
Source 1: China Meteorological Administration
Source 2: Weather China

Climate data for Xining, elevation 2,295 m (7,530 ft), (1991–2020 normals, extremes 1951–present)
Month	Jan	Feb	Mar	Apr	May	Jun	Jul	Aug	Sep	Oct	Nov	Dec	Year
Record high °C (°F)	13.9 (57.0)	20.8 (69.4)	26.2 (79.2)	31.8 (89.2)	31.2 (88.2)	31.9 (89.4)	36.5 (97.7)	34.0 (93.2)	29.9 (85.8)	25.2 (77.4)	19.3 (66.7)	13.3 (55.9)	36.5 (97.7)
Mean daily maximum °C (°F)	2.1 (35.8)	5.8 (42.4)	11.0 (51.8)	16.6 (61.9)	20.2 (68.4)	23.2 (73.8)	25.1 (77.2)	24.2 (75.6)	19.6 (67.3)	14.5 (58.1)	8.6 (47.5)	3.4 (38.1)	14.5 (58.2)
Daily mean °C (°F)	−7.9 (17.8)	−3.6 (25.5)	2.2 (36.0)	8.3 (46.9)	12.3 (54.1)	15.6 (60.1)	17.5 (63.5)	16.6 (61.9)	12.2 (54.0)	6.2 (43.2)	−0.7 (30.7)	−6.3 (20.7)	6.0 (42.9)
Mean daily minimum °C (°F)	−14.6 (5.7)	−10.4 (13.3)	−4.4 (24.1)	1.4 (34.5)	5.7 (42.3)	9.2 (48.6)	11.6 (52.9)	11.1 (52.0)	7.4 (45.3)	0.9 (33.6)	−6.5 (20.3)	−12.6 (9.3)	−0.1 (31.8)
Record low °C (°F)	−24.9 (−12.8)	−20.7 (−5.3)	−16.9 (1.6)	−12.5 (9.5)	−2.3 (27.9)	0.2 (32.4)	4.2 (39.6)	3.7 (38.7)	−1.1 (30.0)	−12.5 (9.5)	−19.0 (−2.2)	−26.6 (−15.9)	−26.6 (−15.9)
Average precipitation mm (inches)	1.8 (0.07)	1.9 (0.07)	8.8 (0.35)	20.7 (0.81)	53.8 (2.12)	64.5 (2.54)	81.5 (3.21)	87.0 (3.43)	68.0 (2.68)	23.3 (0.92)	5.2 (0.20)	1.2 (0.05)	417.7 (16.45)
Average precipitation days (≥ 0.1 mm)	3.2	2.9	4.9	7.1	11.7	14.4	15.4	14.5	14.4	7.7	3.2	2.1	101.5
Average snowy days	5.1	5.8	7.0	3.4	0.4	0	0	0	0.1	1.5	4.2	4.0	31.5
Average relative humidity (%)	48	45	46	47	55	61	66	69	72	67	58	52	57
Mean monthly sunshine hours	196.7	200.3	223.9	232.8	240.5	230.1	223.8	215.8	181.4	200.0	201.8	192.6	2,539.7
Percentage possible sunshine	63	65	60	59	55	53	51	52	49	58	67	64	58
Source: China Meteorological Administration

Climate data for Ürümqi, elevation 935 m (3,068 ft), (1991–2020 normals, extremes 1951–present)
Month	Jan	Feb	Mar	Apr	May	Jun	Jul	Aug	Sep	Oct	Nov	Dec	Year
Record high °C (°F)	9.9 (49.8)	13.5 (56.3)	25.6 (78.1)	32.5 (90.5)	37.0 (98.6)	40.9 (105.6)	41.0 (105.8)	42.1 (107.8)	37.0 (98.6)	30.5 (86.9)	22.0 (71.6)	15.6 (60.1)	42.1 (107.8)
Mean daily maximum °C (°F)	−7.4 (18.7)	−4.3 (24.3)	5.3 (41.5)	17.4 (63.3)	23.4 (74.1)	28.2 (82.8)	30.1 (86.2)	29.0 (84.2)	23.1 (73.6)	14.2 (57.6)	3.3 (37.9)	−4.8 (23.4)	13.1 (55.6)
Daily mean °C (°F)	−12.2 (10.0)	−8.9 (16.0)	0.4 (32.7)	11.5 (52.7)	17.3 (63.1)	22.4 (72.3)	24.2 (75.6)	22.9 (73.2)	17.2 (63.0)	8.8 (47.8)	−0.9 (30.4)	−9.2 (15.4)	7.8 (46.0)
Mean daily minimum °C (°F)	−15.7 (3.7)	−12.3 (9.9)	−3.2 (26.2)	6.6 (43.9)	12.2 (54.0)	17.4 (63.3)	19.3 (66.7)	17.9 (64.2)	12.3 (54.1)	4.6 (40.3)	−4 (25)	−12.6 (9.3)	3.5 (38.4)
Record low °C (°F)	−34.1 (−29.4)	−41.5 (−42.7)	−33.4 (−28.1)	−14.9 (5.2)	−2.4 (27.7)	4.6 (40.3)	8.8 (47.8)	5.0 (41.0)	−5.0 (23.0)	−12.4 (9.7)	−36.6 (−33.9)	−38.3 (−36.9)	−41.5 (−42.7)
Average precipitation mm (inches)	19.0 (0.75)	13.6 (0.54)	18.8 (0.74)	38.3 (1.51)	41.3 (1.63)	48.8 (1.92)	35.4 (1.39)	30.4 (1.20)	29.8 (1.17)	23.8 (0.94)	23.7 (0.93)	25.3 (1.00)	348.2 (13.72)
Average precipitation days (≥ 0.1 mm)	8.1	7.3	5.5	6.7	6.8	7.2	8.0	6.3	4.4	4.8	6.6	9.6	81.3
Average snowy days	13.6	12.6	7.6	2.8	0.3	0	0	0	0.1	2.1	8.4	14.8	62.3
Average relative humidity (%)	77	77	68	45	41	41	43	42	43	54	72	78	57
Mean monthly sunshine hours	101.8	129.7	203.2	261.4	301.9	300.8	306.1	301.1	275.2	234.5	137.0	90.5	2,643.2
Percentage possible sunshine	35	43	54	64	66	65	66	71	75	71	48	33	58
Source: China Meteorological Administration

Climate data for Lhasa, elevation 3,649 m (11,972 ft), (1991–2020 normals, extremes 1951–present)
Month	Jan	Feb	Mar	Apr	May	Jun	Jul	Aug	Sep	Oct	Nov	Dec	Year
Record high °C (°F)	20.5 (68.9)	21.3 (70.3)	25.1 (77.2)	25.9 (78.6)	29.4 (84.9)	30.8 (87.4)	30.4 (86.7)	27.2 (81.0)	26.5 (79.7)	24.8 (76.6)	22.8 (73.0)	20.1 (68.2)	30.8 (87.4)
Mean daily maximum °C (°F)	8.3 (46.9)	10.4 (50.7)	13.4 (56.1)	16.5 (61.7)	20.5 (68.9)	23.9 (75.0)	23.3 (73.9)	22.3 (72.1)	21.1 (70.0)	17.9 (64.2)	13.3 (55.9)	9.7 (49.5)	16.7 (62.1)
Daily mean °C (°F)	0.6 (33.1)	3.1 (37.6)	6.5 (43.7)	9.8 (49.6)	13.8 (56.8)	17.5 (63.5)	17.5 (63.5)	16.7 (62.1)	15.2 (59.4)	10.8 (51.4)	5.4 (41.7)	1.7 (35.1)	9.9 (49.8)
Mean daily minimum °C (°F)	−7.1 (19.2)	−4.2 (24.4)	−0.5 (31.1)	3.1 (37.6)	7.1 (44.8)	11.1 (52.0)	11.7 (53.1)	11.1 (52.0)	9.3 (48.7)	3.7 (38.7)	−2.5 (27.5)	−6.3 (20.7)	3.0 (37.5)
Record low °C (°F)	−16.5 (2.3)	−15.4 (4.3)	−13.6 (7.5)	−8.1 (17.4)	−2.7 (27.1)	2.0 (35.6)	4.5 (40.1)	3.3 (37.9)	0.3 (32.5)	−7.2 (19.0)	−11.2 (11.8)	−16.1 (3.0)	−16.5 (2.3)
Average precipitation mm (inches)	0.9 (0.04)	1.9 (0.07)	3.5 (0.14)	8.3 (0.33)	31.1 (1.22)	84.0 (3.31)	140.5 (5.53)	129.8 (5.11)	64.8 (2.55)	6.5 (0.26)	0.9 (0.04)	0.7 (0.03)	472.9 (18.63)
Average precipitation days (≥ 0.1 mm)	0.6	1.2	2.4	5.2	9.5	14.4	19.8	19.1	13.5	3.5	0.6	0.5	90.3
Average snowy days	1.3	2.2	5.5	5.6	0.9	0	0	0	0.1	1.1	1.3	0.7	18.7
Average relative humidity (%)	25	24	27	36	41	48	59	61	57	43	32	27	40
Mean monthly sunshine hours	250.0	234.4	256.0	254.3	279.8	260.4	227.5	223.5	238.4	280.6	266.2	256.5	3,027.6
Percentage possible sunshine	77	74	68	65	66	62	54	55	65	80	84	81	69
Source: China Meteorological Administration all-time extreme temperature

Climate data for Turpan, elevation 39 m (128 ft), (1991–2020 normals, extremes 1951–present)
Month	Jan	Feb	Mar	Apr	May	Jun	Jul	Aug	Sep	Oct	Nov	Dec	Year
Record high °C (°F)	8.5 (47.3)	19.5 (67.1)	31.7 (89.1)	40.9 (105.6)	43.6 (110.5)	47.6 (117.7)	49.1 (120.4)	47.8 (118.0)	43.4 (110.1)	34.3 (93.7)	23.0 (73.4)	9.6 (49.3)	49.1 (120.4)
Mean daily maximum °C (°F)	−2.3 (27.9)	7.0 (44.6)	17.9 (64.2)	27.8 (82.0)	33.9 (93.0)	38.8 (101.8)	40.5 (104.9)	39.0 (102.2)	32.6 (90.7)	22.5 (72.5)	10.3 (50.5)	−0.4 (31.3)	22.3 (72.1)
Daily mean °C (°F)	−6.7 (19.9)	1.3 (34.3)	11.6 (52.9)	20.7 (69.3)	26.6 (79.9)	31.6 (88.9)	33.1 (91.6)	31.2 (88.2)	24.6 (76.3)	14.5 (58.1)	4.4 (39.9)	−4.4 (24.1)	15.7 (60.3)
Mean daily minimum °C (°F)	−10.3 (13.5)	−3.5 (25.7)	5.9 (42.6)	14.2 (57.6)	19.8 (67.6)	24.7 (76.5)	26.5 (79.7)	24.6 (76.3)	18.4 (65.1)	9.1 (48.4)	0.3 (32.5)	−7.6 (18.3)	10.2 (50.3)
Record low °C (°F)	−34 (−29)	−24.5 (−12.1)	−20.4 (−4.7)	−3.5 (25.7)	1.8 (35.2)	10.7 (51.3)	15.1 (59.2)	11.6 (52.9)	1.3 (34.3)	−5.7 (21.7)	−17.8 (0.0)	−26.1 (−15.0)	−34 (−29)
Average precipitation mm (inches)	0.9 (0.04)	0.5 (0.02)	0.7 (0.03)	0.9 (0.04)	1.0 (0.04)	2.6 (0.10)	2.0 (0.08)	2.0 (0.08)	1.4 (0.06)	1.2 (0.05)	0.6 (0.02)	0.9 (0.04)	14.7 (0.6)
Average precipitation days (≥ 0.1 mm)	1.0	0.3	0.3	0.7	1.1	2.0	2.3	1.9	0.9	0.8	0.5	1.1	12.9
Average snowy days	2.5	0.9	0	0	0	0	0	0	0	0	0.2	2.6	6.2
Average relative humidity (%)	56	40	25	23	25	27	30	31	35	45	50	56	37
Mean monthly sunshine hours	121.8	172.0	234.2	263.7	308.4	301.6	303.3	299.6	273.5	238.6	163.7	108.2	2,788.6
Percentage possible sunshine	41	57	62	65	67	66	66	71	74	71	57	39	61
Source 1: China Meteorological Administration
Source 2: NOAAextremes

Climate data for Turpan (Dongkan Station), elevation −49 m (−161 ft), (1991–2020 normals)
Month	Jan	Feb	Mar	Apr	May	Jun	Jul	Aug	Sep	Oct	Nov	Dec	Year
Mean daily maximum °C (°F)	−1.9 (28.6)	7.6 (45.7)	18.6 (65.5)	28.5 (83.3)	34.5 (94.1)	39.3 (102.7)	40.8 (105.4)	39.3 (102.7)	33.2 (91.8)	23.2 (73.8)	10.9 (51.6)	0.0 (32.0)	22.8 (73.1)
Daily mean °C (°F)	−8.0 (17.6)	0.5 (32.9)	11.1 (52.0)	20.7 (69.3)	26.8 (80.2)	31.9 (89.4)	33.3 (91.9)	31.4 (88.5)	24.8 (76.6)	14.8 (58.6)	3.8 (38.8)	−5.7 (21.7)	15.5 (59.8)
Mean daily minimum °C (°F)	−12.8 (9.0)	−5.5 (22.1)	4.5 (40.1)	13.8 (56.8)	19.7 (67.5)	24.9 (76.8)	26.6 (79.9)	24.7 (76.5)	18.3 (64.9)	8.6 (47.5)	−1.3 (29.7)	−9.9 (14.2)	9.3 (48.8)
Average precipitation mm (inches)	0.8 (0.03)	0.4 (0.02)	0.6 (0.02)	1.0 (0.04)	1.0 (0.04)	2.5 (0.10)	2.0 (0.08)	1.9 (0.07)	1.3 (0.05)	0.9 (0.04)	0.4 (0.02)	0.6 (0.02)	13.4 (0.53)
Average precipitation days (≥ 0.1 mm)	1.0	0.3	0.3	0.8	1.0	2.1	2.4	2.1	1.0	0.6	0.4	0.8	12.8
Average snowy days	2.2	0.6	0	0	0	0	0	0	0	0	0.1	2.0	4.9
Average relative humidity (%)	56	41	26	24	25	28	32	33	34	41	48	57	37
Mean monthly sunshine hours	161.9	193.2	246.9	267.1	307.9	304.8	306.1	302.3	282.0	254.7	186.0	140.0	2,952.9
Percentage possible sunshine	55	64	66	66	67	67	67	71	77	76	65	50	66
Source: China Meteorological Administration

=== Central China ===
Climate data for Wuhan (1991–2020 normals, extremes 1951–present)
Month	Jan	Feb	Mar	Apr	May	Jun	Jul	Aug	Sep	Oct	Nov	Dec	Year
Record high °C (°F)	25.4 (77.7)	29.1 (84.4)	32.4 (90.3)	35.1 (95.2)	36.1 (97.0)	37.8 (100.0)	39.7 (103.5)	39.7 (103.5)	38.6 (101.5)	37.9 (100.2)	30.4 (86.7)	24.2 (75.6)	39.7 (103.5)
Mean daily maximum °C (°F)	8.3 (46.9)	11.4 (52.5)	16.3 (61.3)	22.7 (72.9)	27.3 (81.1)	30.4 (86.7)	33.2 (91.8)	32.8 (91.0)	28.9 (84.0)	23.3 (73.9)	17.1 (62.8)	10.8 (51.4)	21.9 (71.4)
Daily mean °C (°F)	4.1 (39.4)	7.0 (44.6)	11.6 (52.9)	17.8 (64.0)	22.7 (72.9)	26.3 (79.3)	29.3 (84.7)	28.6 (83.5)	24.3 (75.7)	18.3 (64.9)	12.0 (53.6)	6.2 (43.2)	17.4 (63.2)
Mean daily minimum °C (°F)	1.0 (33.8)	3.6 (38.5)	7.9 (46.2)	13.7 (56.7)	18.8 (65.8)	23.0 (73.4)	26.2 (79.2)	25.4 (77.7)	20.8 (69.4)	14.8 (58.6)	8.4 (47.1)	2.8 (37.0)	13.9 (57.0)
Record low °C (°F)	−18.1 (−0.6)	−14.8 (5.4)	−5.0 (23.0)	−0.3 (31.5)	7.2 (45.0)	13.0 (55.4)	17.3 (63.1)	16.4 (61.5)	10.1 (50.2)	1.3 (34.3)	−7.1 (19.2)	−10.1 (13.8)	−18.1 (−0.6)
Average precipitation mm (inches)	52.5 (2.07)	66.4 (2.61)	91.0 (3.58)	137.5 (5.41)	160.6 (6.32)	212.9 (8.38)	255.5 (10.06)	106.3 (4.19)	72.2 (2.84)	66.4 (2.61)	58.2 (2.29)	30.7 (1.21)	1,310.2 (51.57)
Average precipitation days (≥ 0.1 mm)	9.7	9.9	12.6	11.6	12.5	12.0	11.1	9.7	7.7	8.5	9.1	7.2	121.6
Average snowy days	4.3	2.4	0.9	0	0	0	0	0	0	0	0.4	1.4	9.4
Average relative humidity (%)	76	76	75	74	74	78	76	77	75	76	77	74	76
Mean monthly sunshine hours	95.4	97.8	126.4	152.5	165.9	155.8	210.9	214.8	166.0	149.1	132.1	116.7	1,783.4
Percentage possible sunshine	30	31	34	39	39	37	49	53	45	43	37	40	40
Source: China Meteorological Administration

Climate data for Changsha (1991–2020 normals, extremes 1951–present)
Month	Jan	Feb	Mar	Apr	May	Jun	Jul	Aug	Sep	Oct	Nov	Dec	Year
Record high °C (°F)	26.9 (80.4)	30.6 (87.1)	32.8 (91.0)	36.1 (97.0)	36.3 (97.3)	38.2 (100.8)	40.4 (104.7)	40.6 (105.1)	39.5 (103.1)	38.5 (101.3)	33.4 (92.1)	24.9 (76.8)	40.6 (105.1)
Mean daily maximum °C (°F)	8.5 (47.3)	11.5 (52.7)	15.8 (60.4)	22.4 (72.3)	27.1 (80.8)	30.3 (86.5)	33.8 (92.8)	32.7 (90.9)	28.6 (83.5)	23.6 (74.5)	17.7 (63.9)	11.5 (52.7)	22.0 (71.5)
Daily mean °C (°F)	5.1 (41.2)	7.8 (46.0)	11.7 (53.1)	17.9 (64.2)	22.6 (72.7)	26.2 (79.2)	29.6 (85.3)	28.4 (83.1)	24.2 (75.6)	18.9 (66.0)	13.2 (55.8)	7.5 (45.5)	17.8 (64.0)
Mean daily minimum °C (°F)	2.7 (36.9)	5.2 (41.4)	8.9 (48.0)	14.7 (58.5)	19.3 (66.7)	23.1 (73.6)	26.2 (79.2)	25.4 (77.7)	21.1 (70.0)	15.7 (60.3)	10.0 (50.0)	4.7 (40.5)	14.7 (58.6)
Record low °C (°F)	−9.5 (14.9)	−12.0 (10.4)	−2.3 (27.9)	1.9 (35.4)	8.9 (48.0)	13.1 (55.6)	19.7 (67.5)	16.7 (62.1)	11.8 (53.2)	2.4 (36.3)	−2.8 (27.0)	−10.3 (13.5)	−12.0 (10.4)
Average precipitation mm (inches)	74.5 (2.93)	85.0 (3.35)	149.2 (5.87)	173.1 (6.81)	201.7 (7.94)	224.3 (8.83)	162.8 (6.41)	107.5 (4.23)	86.6 (3.41)	60.5 (2.38)	77.7 (3.06)	53.5 (2.11)	1,456.4 (57.33)
Average precipitation days (≥ 0.1 mm)	13.4	13.9	17.4	16.4	15.9	14.4	10.4	10.8	8.8	9.7	9.8	10.8	151.7
Average snowy days	4.9	2.9	0.4	0	0	0	0	0	0	0	0.1	1.9	10.2
Average relative humidity (%)	79	79	79	78	78	80	74	76	78	77	77	75	78
Mean monthly sunshine hours	64.7	66.5	83.5	110.0	137.1	141.4	226.7	208.5	151.2	134.0	112.4	96.8	1,532.8
Percentage possible sunshine	20	21	22	28	33	34	54	52	41	38	35	30	34
Source 1: China Meteorological Administration
Source 2: NOAA

Climate data for Xi'an (normals 1981–2010, extremes 1951–2013)
Month	Jan	Feb	Mar	Apr	May	Jun	Jul	Aug	Sep	Oct	Nov	Dec	Year
Record high °C (°F)	17.0 (62.6)	24.1 (75.4)	31.3 (88.3)	34.9 (94.8)	38.6 (101.5)	41.8 (107.2)	41.0 (105.8)	40.0 (104.0)	38.5 (101.3)	34.1 (93.4)	24.5 (76.1)	21.6 (70.9)	41.8 (107.2)
Mean daily maximum °C (°F)	5.1 (41.2)	8.9 (48.0)	14.4 (57.9)	21.5 (70.7)	26.6 (79.9)	31.4 (88.5)	32.4 (90.3)	30.3 (86.5)	25.6 (78.1)	19.3 (66.7)	12.4 (54.3)	6.3 (43.3)	19.5 (67.1)
Daily mean °C (°F)	0.3 (32.5)	3.6 (38.5)	8.7 (47.7)	15.4 (59.7)	20.5 (68.9)	25.3 (77.5)	27.0 (80.6)	25.1 (77.2)	20.3 (68.5)	14.1 (57.4)	7.2 (45.0)	1.5 (34.7)	14.1 (57.4)
Mean daily minimum °C (°F)	−3.3 (26.1)	−0.4 (31.3)	4.1 (39.4)	10.3 (50.5)	15.1 (59.2)	19.9 (67.8)	22.3 (72.1)	21.0 (69.8)	16.5 (61.7)	10.2 (50.4)	3.2 (37.8)	−2.2 (28.0)	9.7 (49.5)
Record low °C (°F)	−20.6 (−5.1)	−18.7 (−1.7)	−7.6 (18.3)	−4 (25)	3.5 (38.3)	9.2 (48.6)	15.1 (59.2)	12.1 (53.8)	4.8 (40.6)	−1.9 (28.6)	−16.8 (1.8)	−19.3 (−2.7)	−20.6 (−5.1)
Average precipitation mm (inches)	6.7 (0.26)	9.8 (0.39)	27.1 (1.07)	37.5 (1.48)	54.9 (2.16)	64.5 (2.54)	97.5 (3.84)	78.6 (3.09)	94.1 (3.70)	61.7 (2.43)	21.5 (0.85)	7.3 (0.29)	561.2 (22.1)
Average precipitation days (≥ 0.1 mm)	3.4	4.0	6.4	7.8	8.2	8.8	9.9	10.0	11.6	9.9	5.5	3.6	89.1
Average relative humidity (%)	65	62	64	64	65	61	68	75	77	76	73	68	68
Mean monthly sunshine hours	88.4	96.1	116.6	142.8	169.5	179.7	181.1	168.1	121.0	98.9	92.4	81.0	1,535.6
Percentage possible sunshine	32	34	33	38	40	43	44	47	34	32	32	31	37
Source: China Meteorological Administration, all-time extreme temperature

=== East China ===
Climate data for Shanghai (Baoshan District), 1991–2020 normals, extremes 1951–present)
Month	Jan	Feb	Mar	Apr	May	Jun	Jul	Aug	Sep	Oct	Nov	Dec	Year
Record high °C (°F)	23.0 (73.4)	27.0 (80.6)	30.9 (87.6)	34.3 (93.7)	36.4 (97.5)	37.5 (99.5)	39.7 (103.5)	40.0 (104.0)	38.2 (100.8)	36.7 (98.1)	29.2 (84.6)	24.4 (75.9)	40.0 (104.0)
Mean daily maximum °C (°F)	8.2 (46.8)	10.1 (50.2)	14.3 (57.7)	20.1 (68.2)	25.1 (77.2)	27.8 (82.0)	32.4 (90.3)	31.9 (89.4)	27.9 (82.2)	22.9 (73.2)	17.5 (63.5)	11.0 (51.8)	20.8 (69.4)
Daily mean °C (°F)	4.9 (40.8)	6.5 (43.7)	10.3 (50.5)	15.7 (60.3)	20.9 (69.6)	24.4 (75.9)	28.8 (83.8)	28.5 (83.3)	24.7 (76.5)	19.7 (67.5)	13.9 (57.0)	7.5 (45.5)	17.2 (62.9)
Mean daily minimum °C (°F)	2.2 (36.0)	3.6 (38.5)	6.9 (44.4)	12.0 (53.6)	17.5 (63.5)	21.7 (71.1)	25.9 (78.6)	25.9 (78.6)	22.2 (72.0)	16.7 (62.1)	10.7 (51.3)	4.4 (39.9)	14.1 (57.5)
Record low °C (°F)	−10.1 (13.8)	−7.9 (17.8)	−5.4 (22.3)	−0.5 (31.1)	6.9 (44.4)	12.3 (54.1)	16.3 (61.3)	18.3 (64.9)	10.8 (51.4)	1.7 (35.1)	−4.2 (24.4)	−8.5 (16.7)	−10.1 (13.8)
Average precipitation mm (inches)	69.8 (2.75)	64.0 (2.52)	86.5 (3.41)	77.1 (3.04)	90.2 (3.55)	196.7 (7.74)	146.9 (5.78)	210.1 (8.27)	116.5 (4.59)	71.4 (2.81)	57.5 (2.26)	49.3 (1.94)	1,236 (48.66)
Average precipitation days (≥ 0.1 mm)	10.0	9.7	12.2	10.6	10.8	13.7	11.9	12.5	9.9	7.0	8.6	8.1	125
Average snowy days	1.9	1.4	0.4	0.1	0.1	0	0	0	0	0	0.1	0.7	4.7
Average relative humidity (%)	73	73	72	70	71	79	76	77	75	71	72	71	73
Mean monthly sunshine hours	110.4	115.4	136.6	157.0	169.7	120.7	184.7	186.5	161.2	157.6	127.1	127.1	1,754
Percentage possible sunshine	34	37	37	40	40	28	43	46	44	45	40	41	40
Source: China Meteorological Administration

Climate data for Nanjing (1991–2020 normals, extremes 1951–present)
Month	Jan	Feb	Mar	Apr	May	Jun	Jul	Aug	Sep	Oct	Nov	Dec	Year
Record high °C (°F)	21.0 (69.8)	27.7 (81.9)	31.7 (89.1)	34.2 (93.6)	37.5 (99.5)	38.1 (100.6)	40.0 (104.0)	40.7 (105.3)	39.0 (102.2)	38.1 (100.6)	29.2 (84.6)	23.1 (73.6)	40.7 (105.3)
Mean daily maximum °C (°F)	7.4 (45.3)	10.1 (50.2)	15.1 (59.2)	21.4 (70.5)	26.6 (79.9)	29.2 (84.6)	32.4 (90.3)	31.9 (89.4)	27.9 (82.2)	22.8 (73.0)	16.6 (61.9)	10.0 (50.0)	21.0 (69.7)
Daily mean °C (°F)	3.1 (37.6)	5.6 (42.1)	10.1 (50.2)	16.2 (61.2)	21.5 (70.7)	25.0 (77.0)	28.4 (83.1)	27.9 (82.2)	23.7 (74.7)	18.0 (64.4)	11.5 (52.7)	5.4 (41.7)	16.4 (61.5)
Mean daily minimum °C (°F)	0.0 (32.0)	2.0 (35.6)	6.0 (42.8)	11.6 (52.9)	17.1 (62.8)	21.4 (70.5)	25.1 (77.2)	24.8 (76.6)	20.3 (68.5)	14.2 (57.6)	7.7 (45.9)	1.9 (35.4)	12.7 (54.8)
Record low °C (°F)	−14.0 (6.8)	−13.0 (8.6)	−7.1 (19.2)	−0.2 (31.6)	5.0 (41.0)	11.8 (53.2)	16.8 (62.2)	16.9 (62.4)	7.7 (45.9)	0.2 (32.4)	−6.3 (20.7)	−13.1 (8.4)	−14.0 (6.8)
Average precipitation mm (inches)	50.2 (1.98)	53.5 (2.11)	79.7 (3.14)	82.4 (3.24)	83.8 (3.30)	193.4 (7.61)	226.8 (8.93)	158.5 (6.24)	72.9 (2.87)	55.5 (2.19)	52.3 (2.06)	35.0 (1.38)	1,144 (45.05)
Average precipitation days (≥ 0.1 mm)	9.2	8.9	10.9	9.6	9.9	10.6	11.7	12.1	7.8	7.3	7.7	7.2	112.9
Average snowy days	3.7	3.0	1.0	0	0	0	0	0	0	0	0.4	1.2	9.3
Average relative humidity (%)	73	71	69	68	69	76	78	79	76	73	71	73	73
Mean monthly sunshine hours	121.2	124.5	153.2	180.6	190.4	155.4	195.4	197.6	165.0	168.6	145.4	135.1	1,932.4
Percentage possible sunshine	38	40	41	46	45	37	45	48	45	48	47	43	44
Source: China Meteorological Administration

Climate data for Hangzhou (1991–2020 normals, extremes 1951–present)
Month	Jan	Feb	Mar	Apr	May	Jun	Jul	Aug	Sep	Oct	Nov	Dec	Year
Record high °C (°F)	25.4 (77.7)	28.5 (83.3)	32.8 (91.0)	35.1 (95.2)	37.6 (99.7)	39.7 (103.5)	41.3 (106.3)	41.9 (107.4)	38.8 (101.8)	38.4 (101.1)	31.2 (88.2)	26.5 (79.7)	41.9 (107.4)
Mean maximum °C (°F)	17.4 (63.3)	21.3 (70.3)	25.7 (78.3)	30.6 (87.1)	33.8 (92.8)	35.3 (95.5)	37.9 (100.2)	37.3 (99.1)	34.4 (93.9)	30.3 (86.5)	25.1 (77.2)	19.5 (67.1)	38.2 (100.8)
Mean daily maximum °C (°F)	8.6 (47.5)	11.1 (52.0)	15.9 (60.6)	22.1 (71.8)	26.9 (80.4)	29.2 (84.6)	34.0 (93.2)	33.4 (92.1)	28.7 (83.7)	23.6 (74.5)	17.7 (63.9)	11.3 (52.3)	21.9 (71.4)
Daily mean °C (°F)	5.0 (41.0)	7.0 (44.6)	11.1 (52.0)	17.0 (62.6)	22.0 (71.6)	25.0 (77.0)	29.3 (84.7)	28.7 (83.7)	24.5 (76.1)	19.3 (66.7)	13.3 (55.9)	7.4 (45.3)	17.5 (63.4)
Mean daily minimum °C (°F)	2.2 (36.0)	4.0 (39.2)	7.6 (45.7)	13.0 (55.4)	18.0 (64.4)	21.8 (71.2)	25.6 (78.1)	25.4 (77.7)	21.4 (70.5)	15.8 (60.4)	10.0 (50.0)	4.3 (39.7)	14.1 (57.4)
Mean minimum °C (°F)	−3.9 (25.0)	−2.3 (27.9)	0.8 (33.4)	5.8 (42.4)	12.1 (53.8)	16.9 (62.4)	21.5 (70.7)	21.4 (70.5)	16.0 (60.8)	9.0 (48.2)	2.5 (36.5)	−2.8 (27.0)	−4.6 (23.7)
Record low °C (°F)	−8.6 (16.5)	−9.6 (14.7)	−3.5 (25.7)	0.2 (32.4)	7.3 (45.1)	12.8 (55.0)	17.3 (63.1)	18.2 (64.8)	12.0 (53.6)	1.0 (33.8)	−3.6 (25.5)	−8.4 (16.9)	−9.6 (14.7)
Average precipitation mm (inches)	93.3 (3.67)	89.9 (3.54)	135.7 (5.34)	116.8 (4.60)	126.8 (4.99)	258.2 (10.17)	167.5 (6.59)	176.8 (6.96)	113.3 (4.46)	74.1 (2.92)	75.2 (2.96)	64.2 (2.53)	1,491.8 (58.73)
Average precipitation days (≥ 0.1 mm)	12.4	11.7	14.9	13.8	13.3	15.4	12.2	13.7	11.2	8.1	10.6	9.7	147
Average snowy days	4.2	2.8	0.8	0.1	0	0	0	0	0	0	0.2	1.4	9.5
Average relative humidity (%)	74	73	72	70	71	79	73	75	76	73	75	72	74
Mean monthly sunshine hours	95.6	97.7	120.4	144.7	158.9	120.0	204.6	187.9	139.9	141.6	118.9	112.6	1,642.8
Percentage possible sunshine	30	31	32	37	38	28	48	46	38	40	38	36	37
Source: China Meteorological Administration

Climate data for Qingdao (1991–2020 normals, extremes 1951-2010)
Month	Jan	Feb	Mar	Apr	May	Jun	Jul	Aug	Sep	Oct	Nov	Dec	Year
Record high °C (°F)	12.9 (55.2)	19.6 (67.3)	21.5 (70.7)	25.2 (77.4)	34.2 (93.6)	34.4 (93.9)	38.9 (102.0)	34.3 (93.7)	33.2 (91.8)	28.4 (83.1)	22.1 (71.8)	16.2 (61.2)	38.9 (102.0)
Mean daily maximum °C (°F)	3.4 (38.1)	5.6 (42.1)	10.0 (50.0)	15.7 (60.3)	21.1 (70.0)	24.3 (75.7)	27.6 (81.7)	28.7 (83.7)	25.8 (78.4)	20.2 (68.4)	12.8 (55.0)	5.9 (42.6)	16.8 (62.2)
Daily mean °C (°F)	0.2 (32.4)	2.1 (35.8)	6.2 (43.2)	11.6 (52.9)	17.1 (62.8)	20.8 (69.4)	24.7 (76.5)	25.6 (78.1)	22.3 (72.1)	16.6 (61.9)	9.5 (49.1)	2.7 (36.9)	13.3 (55.9)
Mean daily minimum °C (°F)	−2.4 (27.7)	−0.6 (30.9)	3.4 (38.1)	8.7 (47.7)	14.1 (57.4)	18.5 (65.3)	22.7 (72.9)	23.4 (74.1)	19.5 (67.1)	13.7 (56.7)	6.7 (44.1)	0.1 (32.2)	10.7 (51.2)
Record low °C (°F)	−15.5 (4.1)	−12.1 (10.2)	−6.2 (20.8)	−1.6 (29.1)	6.1 (43.0)	12.0 (53.6)	13.6 (56.5)	16.3 (61.3)	10.1 (50.2)	1.9 (35.4)	−7.2 (19.0)	−11.3 (11.7)	−15.5 (4.1)
Average precipitation mm (inches)	10.3 (0.41)	15.7 (0.62)	18.0 (0.71)	34.0 (1.34)	64.1 (2.52)	70.7 (2.78)	159.1 (6.26)	159.6 (6.28)	69.4 (2.73)	35.5 (1.40)	35.2 (1.39)	14.8 (0.58)	686.4 (27.02)
Average precipitation days (≥ 0.1 mm)	2.8	4.0	4.6	6.5	7.7	8.7	11.6	10.9	7.2	5.3	5.2	3.6	78.1
Average snowy days	3.8	3.3	1.6	0.2	0	0	0	0	0	0	0.7	2.7	12.3
Average relative humidity (%)	63	65	65	67	71	82	86	82	71	64	64	63	70
Mean monthly sunshine hours	160.4	164.9	208.6	219.1	234.3	186.0	168.3	194.5	201.1	202.1	163.4	158.5	2,261.2
Percentage possible sunshine	52	53	56	56	54	43	38	47	55	59	54	53	52
Average ultraviolet index	2	3	5	7	9	9	10	9	7	5	3	1	6
Source 1: China Meteorological Administration
Source 2: Weather China Weather Atlas (UV index)

Climate data for Hefei (1991–2020 normals, extremes 1951–present)
Month	Jan	Feb	Mar	Apr	May	Jun	Jul	Aug	Sep	Oct	Nov	Dec	Year
Record high °C (°F)	20.7 (69.3)	27.5 (81.5)	30.9 (87.6)	34.7 (94.5)	36.4 (97.5)	37.8 (100.0)	41.1 (106.0)	41.0 (105.8)	38.6 (101.5)	39.9 (103.8)	30.1 (86.2)	24.0 (75.2)	41.1 (106.0)
Mean daily maximum °C (°F)	7.2 (45.0)	10.2 (50.4)	15.5 (59.9)	21.9 (71.4)	27.1 (80.8)	29.7 (85.5)	32.6 (90.7)	32.1 (89.8)	28.2 (82.8)	22.9 (73.2)	16.4 (61.5)	9.9 (49.8)	21.1 (70.1)
Daily mean °C (°F)	3.1 (37.6)	5.7 (42.3)	10.6 (51.1)	16.8 (62.2)	22.2 (72.0)	25.6 (78.1)	28.6 (83.5)	27.9 (82.2)	23.6 (74.5)	17.9 (64.2)	11.4 (52.5)	5.3 (41.5)	16.6 (61.8)
Mean daily minimum °C (°F)	−0.1 (31.8)	2.2 (36.0)	6.6 (43.9)	12.4 (54.3)	17.8 (64.0)	21.9 (71.4)	25.4 (77.7)	24.7 (76.5)	20.1 (68.2)	13.9 (57.0)	7.4 (45.3)	1.7 (35.1)	12.8 (55.1)
Record low °C (°F)	−20.6 (−5.1)	−14.1 (6.6)	−7.3 (18.9)	−0.4 (31.3)	6.2 (43.2)	12.2 (54.0)	17.9 (64.2)	15.8 (60.4)	10.8 (51.4)	1.5 (34.7)	−5.1 (22.8)	−13.5 (7.7)	−20.6 (−5.1)
Average precipitation mm (inches)	47.4 (1.87)	52.8 (2.08)	76.3 (3.00)	83.7 (3.30)	90.1 (3.55)	158.5 (6.24)	185.1 (7.29)	138.7 (5.46)	70.3 (2.77)	51.6 (2.03)	54.6 (2.15)	33.7 (1.33)	1,042.8 (41.07)
Average precipitation days (≥ 0.1 mm)	9.0	8.8	10.3	9.8	10.4	10.5	11.8	11.9	8.1	8.3	8.2	6.8	113.9
Average snowy days	4.3	2.6	1.1	0	0	0	0	0	0	0	0.5	1.5	10
Average relative humidity (%)	75	74	71	70	71	77	80	81	77	74	75	73	75
Mean monthly sunshine hours	109.2	113.7	143.2	173.9	182.9	155.9	186.2	176.8	150.0	151.3	140.4	126.9	1,810.4
Percentage possible sunshine	34	36	38	45	43	37	43	43	41	43	45	41	41
Source: China Meteorological Administration

=== South China ===
Climate data for Hong Kong, normals 1991–2020, (Note: Mean monthly maxima and minima (i.e. the expected highest and lowest temperature readings at any point during the year or given month) calculated based on data in Hong Kong from 1991 to 2020.) extremes 1884–1939 and 1947–present
Month	Jan	Feb	Mar	Apr	May	Jun	Jul	Aug	Sep	Oct	Nov	Dec	Year
Record high °C (°F)	26.9 (80.4)	28.3 (82.9)	30.1 (86.2)	33.4 (92.1)	36.1 (97.0)	35.6 (96.1)	35.7 (96.3)	36.6 (97.9)	35.2 (95.4)	34.3 (93.7)	31.8 (89.2)	28.7 (83.7)	36.6 (97.9)
Mean maximum °C (°F)	24.0 (75.2)	25.1 (77.2)	27.5 (81.5)	30.2 (86.4)	32.3 (90.1)	33.6 (92.5)	34.1 (93.4)	34.2 (93.6)	33.4 (92.1)	31.3 (88.3)	28.4 (83.1)	25.1 (77.2)	34.7 (94.5)
Mean daily maximum °C (°F)	18.7 (65.7)	19.4 (66.9)	21.9 (71.4)	25.6 (78.1)	28.8 (83.8)	30.7 (87.3)	31.6 (88.9)	31.3 (88.3)	30.5 (86.9)	28.1 (82.6)	24.5 (76.1)	20.4 (68.7)	26.0 (78.8)
Daily mean °C (°F)	16.5 (61.7)	17.1 (62.8)	19.5 (67.1)	23.0 (73.4)	26.3 (79.3)	28.3 (82.9)	28.9 (84.0)	28.7 (83.7)	27.9 (82.2)	25.7 (78.3)	22.2 (72.0)	18.2 (64.8)	23.5 (74.3)
Mean daily minimum °C (°F)	14.6 (58.3)	15.3 (59.5)	17.6 (63.7)	21.1 (70.0)	24.5 (76.1)	26.5 (79.7)	26.9 (80.4)	26.7 (80.1)	26.1 (79.0)	23.9 (75.0)	20.3 (68.5)	16.2 (61.2)	21.6 (70.9)
Mean minimum °C (°F)	9.1 (48.4)	10.2 (50.4)	12.2 (54.0)	16.3 (61.3)	20.7 (69.3)	23.6 (74.5)	24.2 (75.6)	24.3 (75.7)	23.5 (74.3)	20.1 (68.2)	15.3 (59.5)	10.1 (50.2)	7.8 (46.0)
Record low °C (°F)	0.0 (32.0)	2.4 (36.3)	4.8 (40.6)	9.9 (49.8)	15.4 (59.7)	19.2 (66.6)	21.7 (71.1)	21.6 (70.9)	18.4 (65.1)	13.5 (56.3)	6.5 (43.7)	4.3 (39.7)	0.0 (32.0)
Average rainfall mm (inches)	33.2 (1.31)	38.9 (1.53)	75.3 (2.96)	153.0 (6.02)	290.6 (11.44)	491.5 (19.35)	385.8 (15.19)	453.2 (17.84)	321.4 (12.65)	120.3 (4.74)	39.3 (1.55)	28.8 (1.13)	2,431.2 (95.72)
Average rainy days (≥ 0.1 mm)	5.70	7.97	10.50	11.37	15.37	19.33	18.43	17.50	14.90	7.83	5.70	5.30	139.90
Average relative humidity (%)	74	79	82	83	83	82	81	81	78	73	72	70	78
Mean monthly sunshine hours	145.8	101.7	100.0	113.2	138.8	144.3	197.3	182.1	174.4	197.8	172.3	161.6	1,829.3
Percentage possible sunshine	43	32	27	30	34	36	48	46	47	55	52	48	41
Source: Hong Kong Observatory

Climate data for Guangzhou (1991–2020 normals, extremes 1951–present)
Month	Jan	Feb	Mar	Apr	May	Jun	Jul	Aug	Sep	Oct	Nov	Dec	Year
Record high °C (°F)	28.4 (83.1)	29.4 (84.9)	32.1 (89.8)	33.3 (91.9)	39.0 (102.2)	38.9 (102.0)	39.1 (102.4)	38.3 (100.9)	37.6 (99.7)	36.2 (97.2)	33.4 (92.1)	29.9 (85.8)	39.1 (102.4)
Mean daily maximum °C (°F)	18.7 (65.7)	20.0 (68.0)	22.3 (72.1)	26.4 (79.5)	30.0 (86.0)	32.0 (89.6)	33.3 (91.9)	33.2 (91.8)	32.0 (89.6)	29.3 (84.7)	25.3 (77.5)	20.7 (69.3)	26.9 (80.5)
Daily mean °C (°F)	13.8 (56.8)	15.5 (59.9)	18.3 (64.9)	22.5 (72.5)	26.0 (78.8)	27.9 (82.2)	28.9 (84.0)	28.6 (83.5)	27.4 (81.3)	24.4 (75.9)	20.2 (68.4)	15.4 (59.7)	22.4 (72.3)
Mean daily minimum °C (°F)	10.6 (51.1)	12.5 (54.5)	15.5 (59.9)	19.6 (67.3)	23.1 (73.6)	25.1 (77.2)	25.8 (78.4)	25.5 (77.9)	24.2 (75.6)	20.9 (69.6)	16.7 (62.1)	11.9 (53.4)	19.3 (66.7)
Record low °C (°F)	0.1 (32.2)	0.0 (32.0)	3.2 (37.8)	7.7 (45.9)	13.7 (56.7)	18.8 (65.8)	21.6 (70.9)	20.9 (69.6)	15.5 (59.9)	9.5 (49.1)	4.9 (40.8)	0.0 (32.0)	0.0 (32.0)
Average precipitation mm (inches)	51.1 (2.01)	56.1 (2.21)	101.0 (3.98)	193.8 (7.63)	329.0 (12.95)	364.9 (14.37)	242.6 (9.55)	270.3 (10.64)	203.2 (8.00)	67.3 (2.65)	37.4 (1.47)	33.4 (1.31)	1,950.1 (76.77)
Average precipitation days (≥ 0.1 mm)	7.2	9.4	13.8	15.3	17.4	19.4	17.0	16.8	12.0	5.7	5.7	5.7	145.4
Average relative humidity (%)	72	76	80	82	81	82	79	80	77	70	69	67	76
Mean monthly sunshine hours	112.9	77.5	61.6	69.1	103.4	127.5	179.0	166.4	167.0	182.2	159.7	152.7	1,559
Percentage possible sunshine	33	24	17	18	25	32	43	42	46	51	49	46	36
Source: China Meteorological Data Service Center all-time extreme temperature

Climate data for Haikou (1981–2010 normals, extremes 1951–2015)
Month	Jan	Feb	Mar	Apr	May	Jun	Jul	Aug	Sep	Oct	Nov	Dec	Year
Record high °C (°F)	33.5 (92.3)	37.2 (99.0)	38.1 (100.6)	39.6 (103.3)	38.8 (101.8)	38.4 (101.1)	38.7 (101.7)	37.3 (99.1)	36.0 (96.8)	34.5 (94.1)	34.7 (94.5)	31.5 (88.7)	39.6 (103.3)
Mean daily maximum °C (°F)	21.8 (71.2)	22.9 (73.2)	26.3 (79.3)	30.7 (87.3)	32.3 (90.1)	33.7 (92.7)	33.5 (92.3)	32.6 (90.7)	30.7 (87.3)	29.1 (84.4)	26.2 (79.2)	22.4 (72.3)	28.5 (83.3)
Daily mean °C (°F)	18.4 (65.1)	19.4 (66.9)	22.2 (72.0)	26.0 (78.8)	27.9 (82.2)	29.0 (84.2)	29.1 (84.4)	28.6 (83.5)	27.4 (81.3)	26.0 (78.8)	23.3 (73.9)	19.8 (67.6)	24.8 (76.6)
Mean daily minimum °C (°F)	16.1 (61.0)	17.2 (63.0)	19.6 (67.3)	23.2 (73.8)	25.1 (77.2)	25.9 (78.6)	26.0 (78.8)	25.9 (78.6)	25.0 (77.0)	23.7 (74.7)	21.0 (69.8)	17.8 (64.0)	22.2 (72.0)
Record low °C (°F)	2.8 (37.0)	6.5 (43.7)	6.4 (43.5)	9.8 (49.6)	16.3 (61.3)	21.2 (70.2)	21.0 (69.8)	21.7 (71.1)	17.5 (63.5)	14.1 (57.4)	10.0 (50.0)	5.3 (41.5)	2.8 (37.0)
Average rainfall mm (inches)	20.3 (0.80)	38.2 (1.50)	50.4 (1.98)	90.1 (3.55)	175.6 (6.91)	220.5 (8.68)	214.7 (8.45)	262.1 (10.32)	255.8 (10.07)	221.9 (8.74)	72.4 (2.85)	34.3 (1.35)	1,656.3 (65.2)
Average rainy days (≥ 0.1 mm)	8.4	10.6	10.1	11.5	16.5	16.0	15.0	14.9	14.3	12.5	7.9	7.3	145.0
Average relative humidity (%)	85	87	85	82	81	81	80	82	83	79	79	80	82
Mean monthly sunshine hours	109.1	98.7	137.3	167.9	218.1	222.8	251.3	217.7	193.8	176.7	144.8	131.3	2,069.5
Percentage possible sunshine	32	31	37	45	54	56	61	55	53	49	43	39	47
Source: China Meteorological Administration (precipitation days and sunshine 1971–2000), all-time extreme temperature

Climate data for Sanya, elevation 6 m (20 ft), (1991–2020 normals, extremes 1951–present)
Month	Jan	Feb	Mar	Apr	May	Jun	Jul	Aug	Sep	Oct	Nov	Dec	Year
Record high °C (°F)	31.2 (88.2)	32.2 (90.0)	34.5 (94.1)	35.8 (96.4)	37.5 (99.5)	36.7 (98.1)	37.1 (98.8)	37.0 (98.6)	35.9 (96.6)	35.0 (95.0)	34.0 (93.2)	33.0 (91.4)	37.5 (99.5)
Mean daily maximum °C (°F)	26.6 (79.9)	27.3 (81.1)	29.1 (84.4)	31.1 (88.0)	32.4 (90.3)	32.5 (90.5)	32.0 (89.6)	31.9 (89.4)	31.7 (89.1)	30.9 (87.6)	29.6 (85.3)	27.3 (81.1)	30.2 (86.4)
Daily mean °C (°F)	22.3 (72.1)	23.1 (73.6)	25.2 (77.4)	27.4 (81.3)	29.1 (84.4)	29.5 (85.1)	28.9 (84.0)	28.6 (83.5)	28.0 (82.4)	27.0 (80.6)	25.4 (77.7)	23.1 (73.6)	26.5 (79.6)
Mean daily minimum °C (°F)	19.6 (67.3)	20.6 (69.1)	22.8 (73.0)	25.0 (77.0)	26.5 (79.7)	26.5 (79.7)	26.9 (80.4)	26.2 (79.2)	25.4 (77.7)	24.2 (75.6)	22.7 (72.9)	20.4 (68.7)	23.9 (75.0)
Record low °C (°F)	5.1 (41.2)	8.9 (48.0)	10.5 (50.9)	15.5 (59.9)	19.8 (67.6)	21.3 (70.3)	22.0 (71.6)	21.8 (71.2)	18.8 (65.8)	14.7 (58.5)	7.9 (46.2)	7.1 (44.8)	5.1 (41.2)
Average precipitation mm (inches)	6.2 (0.24)	13.5 (0.53)	20.9 (0.82)	50.7 (2.00)	131.0 (5.16)	181.7 (7.15)	211.7 (8.33)	227.1 (8.94)	248.5 (9.78)	235.9 (9.29)	74.3 (2.93)	16.0 (0.63)	1,417.5 (55.8)
Average precipitation days (≥ 0.1 mm)	3.4	3.6	3.9	5.6	10.0	14.0	13.8	16.0	17.0	13.5	6.6	3.7	111.1
Average relative humidity (%)	77	80	82	83	83	84	85	85	84	79	77	74	81
Mean monthly sunshine hours	188.1	151.8	180.7	207.8	242.7	215.8	241.7	224.7	198.0	205.7	191.1	177.0	2,425.1
Average ultraviolet index	9	11	12	12	12	12	12	12	12	10	9	8	11
Source 1: China Meteorological Administration (precipitation and sun 1981–2008)
Source 2: Weather China (precipitation days 1971–2000)NOAA Weather Atlas

Climate data for Nanning (Yongning District) (1991–2020 normals, extremes 1951–2010)
Month	Jan	Feb	Mar	Apr	May	Jun	Jul	Aug	Sep	Oct	Nov	Dec	Year
Record high °C (°F)	32.6 (90.7)	36.2 (97.2)	35.5 (95.9)	38.3 (100.9)	40.4 (104.7)	37.9 (100.2)	39.0 (102.2)	39.1 (102.4)	38.2 (100.8)	35.2 (95.4)	33.7 (92.7)	30.5 (86.9)	40.4 (104.7)
Mean daily maximum °C (°F)	17.3 (63.1)	19.2 (66.6)	21.8 (71.2)	27.2 (81.0)	30.9 (87.6)	32.3 (90.1)	32.9 (91.2)	33.1 (91.6)	32.1 (89.8)	29.1 (84.4)	24.9 (76.8)	20.0 (68.0)	26.7 (80.1)
Daily mean °C (°F)	13.3 (55.9)	15.1 (59.2)	18.0 (64.4)	23.0 (73.4)	26.4 (79.5)	28.1 (82.6)	28.5 (83.3)	28.4 (83.1)	27.2 (81.0)	24.1 (75.4)	19.8 (67.6)	15.2 (59.4)	22.3 (72.1)
Mean daily minimum °C (°F)	10.7 (51.3)	12.5 (54.5)	15.4 (59.7)	20.0 (68.0)	23.3 (73.9)	25.3 (77.5)	25.7 (78.3)	25.5 (77.9)	24.0 (75.2)	20.7 (69.3)	16.4 (61.5)	12.0 (53.6)	19.3 (66.7)
Record low °C (°F)	−2.1 (28.2)	0.2 (32.4)	3.7 (38.7)	9.2 (48.6)	13.5 (56.3)	18.2 (64.8)	19.7 (67.5)	19.9 (67.8)	15.4 (59.7)	6.9 (44.4)	0.7 (33.3)	−1.9 (28.6)	−2.1 (28.2)
Average precipitation mm (inches)	40.9 (1.61)	31.0 (1.22)	61.0 (2.40)	75.5 (2.97)	174.8 (6.88)	216.8 (8.54)	222.4 (8.76)	193.5 (7.62)	111.2 (4.38)	65.3 (2.57)	42.2 (1.66)	34.6 (1.36)	1,269.2 (49.97)
Average precipitation days (≥ 0.1 mm)	9.6	9.6	13.8	12.2	13.9	16.4	16.6	15.4	9.7	6.8	6.9	7.2	138.1
Average relative humidity (%)	76	78	82	79	79	83	82	82	78	74	74	72	78
Mean monthly sunshine hours	64.3	60.0	57.6	103.3	152.7	155.4	187.9	193.3	187.2	175.5	132.6	108.7	1,578.5
Percentage possible sunshine	19	19	15	27	37	38	45	49	51	49	40	33	35
Source: China Meteorological Administration all-time extreme temperature

=== Southwest China ===
Climate data for Chongqing (Shapingba District), elevation 259 m (850 ft), (1991–2020 normals, extremes 1951–present)
Month	Jan	Feb	Mar	Apr	May	Jun	Jul	Aug	Sep	Oct	Nov	Dec	Year
Record high °C (°F)	19.0 (66.2)	27.6 (81.7)	34.3 (93.7)	36.5 (97.7)	38.9 (102.0)	39.8 (103.6)	42.0 (107.6)	43.7 (110.7)	42.0 (107.6)	37.4 (99.3)	29.6 (85.3)	21.5 (70.7)	43.7 (110.7)
Mean maximum °C (°F)	14.6 (58.3)	19.8 (67.6)	26.5 (79.7)	31.4 (88.5)	33.9 (93.0)	35.8 (96.4)	38.9 (102.0)	39.5 (103.1)	35.6 (96.1)	29.3 (84.7)	23.1 (73.6)	16.5 (61.7)	40.2 (104.4)
Mean daily maximum °C (°F)	10.4 (50.7)	13.6 (56.5)	18.6 (65.5)	23.9 (75.0)	27.4 (81.3)	29.8 (85.6)	33.7 (92.7)	33.9 (93.0)	28.5 (83.3)	22.0 (71.6)	17.3 (63.1)	11.7 (53.1)	22.6 (72.6)
Daily mean °C (°F)	8.1 (46.6)	10.4 (50.7)	14.5 (58.1)	19.2 (66.6)	22.6 (72.7)	25.4 (77.7)	28.9 (84.0)	28.9 (84.0)	24.4 (75.9)	18.9 (66.0)	14.5 (58.1)	9.5 (49.1)	18.8 (65.8)
Mean daily minimum °C (°F)	6.4 (43.5)	8.3 (46.9)	11.7 (53.1)	16.0 (60.8)	19.4 (66.9)	22.4 (72.3)	25.4 (77.7)	25.3 (77.5)	21.5 (70.7)	16.8 (62.2)	12.5 (54.5)	8.0 (46.4)	16.1 (61.0)
Mean minimum °C (°F)	2.1 (35.8)	3.8 (38.8)	6.5 (43.7)	10.9 (51.6)	14.3 (57.7)	18.2 (64.8)	21.6 (70.9)	21.3 (70.3)	16.8 (62.2)	11.2 (52.2)	7.0 (44.6)	3.2 (37.8)	1.1 (34.0)
Record low °C (°F)	−1.8 (28.8)	−0.8 (30.6)	1.2 (34.2)	2.8 (37.0)	10.8 (51.4)	15.5 (59.9)	19.2 (66.6)	17.8 (64.0)	14.3 (57.7)	6.9 (44.4)	0.7 (33.3)	−1.7 (28.9)	−1.8 (28.8)
Average precipitation mm (inches)	20.7 (0.81)	22.4 (0.88)	55.6 (2.19)	103.4 (4.07)	142.5 (5.61)	212.1 (8.35)	174.2 (6.86)	125.7 (4.95)	124.7 (4.91)	95.3 (3.75)	50.4 (1.98)	24.7 (0.97)	1,151.7 (45.33)
Average precipitation days (≥ 0.1 mm)	10.0	8.9	11.5	13.6	16.0	16.0	11.3	11.5	12.6	15.8	11.3	10.6	149.1
Average snowy days	0.2	0.1	0	0	0	0	0	0	0	0	0	0.1	0.4
Average relative humidity (%)	82	78	75	75	76	79	73	70	77	84	83	84	78
Mean monthly sunshine hours	16.6	32.9	72.8	105.8	109.7	98.7	169.3	175.2	102.6	46.6	35.0	18.0	983.2
Percentage possible sunshine	5	10	19	27	26	24	40	43	28	13	11	6	21
Average ultraviolet index	4	6	8	10	11	12	12	11	10	7	5	4	8
Source 1: China Meteorological Administration
Source 2: Weather Atlas (uv)

Climate data for Chongqing (Yubei District), elevation 465 m (1,526 ft), (1991–2020 normals, extremes 1981–present)
Month	Jan	Feb	Mar	Apr	May	Jun	Jul	Aug	Sep	Oct	Nov	Dec	Year
Record high °C (°F)	18.4 (65.1)	23.7 (74.7)	32.3 (90.1)	34.1 (93.4)	36.1 (97.0)	35.6 (96.1)	38.7 (101.7)	41.9 (107.4)	40.9 (105.6)	33.1 (91.6)	27.7 (81.9)	17.9 (64.2)	41.9 (107.4)
Mean daily maximum °C (°F)	8.9 (48.0)	12.0 (53.6)	16.9 (62.4)	22.2 (72.0)	25.6 (78.1)	28.0 (82.4)	32.0 (89.6)	32.3 (90.1)	27.0 (80.6)	20.6 (69.1)	16.0 (60.8)	10.2 (50.4)	21.0 (69.8)
Daily mean °C (°F)	6.7 (44.1)	9.0 (48.2)	13.2 (55.8)	18.0 (64.4)	21.4 (70.5)	24.1 (75.4)	27.6 (81.7)	27.6 (81.7)	23.1 (73.6)	17.7 (63.9)	13.2 (55.8)	8.0 (46.4)	17.5 (63.5)
Mean daily minimum °C (°F)	5.1 (41.2)	7.1 (44.8)	10.6 (51.1)	15.0 (59.0)	18.4 (65.1)	21.3 (70.3)	24.2 (75.6)	24.1 (75.4)	20.4 (68.7)	15.7 (60.3)	11.4 (52.5)	6.5 (43.7)	15.0 (59.0)
Record low °C (°F)	−7.4 (18.7)	0.2 (32.4)	0.0 (32.0)	4.9 (40.8)	9.6 (49.3)	14.0 (57.2)	18.2 (64.8)	17.4 (63.3)	13.2 (55.8)	6.2 (43.2)	2.6 (36.7)	−2.8 (27.0)	−7.4 (18.7)
Average precipitation mm (inches)	19.6 (0.77)	22.6 (0.89)	55.2 (2.17)	101.2 (3.98)	154.8 (6.09)	205.6 (8.09)	167.4 (6.59)	130.9 (5.15)	129.3 (5.09)	104.8 (4.13)	52.4 (2.06)	24.4 (0.96)	1,168.2 (45.97)
Average precipitation days (≥ 0.1 mm)	9.9	9.4	12.0	14.1	16.5	16.2	12.3	10.9	13.0	16.7	11.9	11.2	154.1
Average snowy days	1.0	0.4	0	0	0	0	0	0	0	0	0	0.2	1.6
Average relative humidity (%)	83	79	75	76	82	75	72	79	85	84	85	79	80
Mean monthly sunshine hours	35.9	45.5	85.8	116.9	126	112	195.8	208.4	127.7	70.4	59.4	34.9	1,218.7
Percentage possible sunshine	11	14	23	30	30	27	46	51	35	20	19	11	26
Source: China Meteorological Administrationall-time extreme temperatureall-time January high

Climate data for NE Chongqing (Wushan County), elevation 276 m (906 ft), (1991–2020 normals, extremes 1981–2010)
Month	Jan	Feb	Mar	Apr	May	Jun	Jul	Aug	Sep	Oct	Nov	Dec	Year
Record high °C (°F)	21.8 (71.2)	27.5 (81.5)	34.3 (93.7)	37.5 (99.5)	40.8 (105.4)	41.9 (107.4)	42.1 (107.8)	42.8 (109.0)	42.2 (108.0)	35.5 (95.9)	26.4 (79.5)	20.7 (69.3)	42.8 (109.0)
Mean daily maximum °C (°F)	10.9 (51.6)	13.6 (56.5)	18.6 (65.5)	24.3 (75.7)	27.9 (82.2)	31.3 (88.3)	34.1 (93.4)	34.3 (93.7)	29.7 (85.5)	23.6 (74.5)	18.3 (64.9)	12.4 (54.3)	23.2 (73.8)
Daily mean °C (°F)	7.5 (45.5)	9.7 (49.5)	13.6 (56.5)	18.8 (65.8)	22.5 (72.5)	26 (79)	28.6 (83.5)	28.5 (83.3)	24.6 (76.3)	19.1 (66.4)	14.3 (57.7)	9.2 (48.6)	18.5 (65.4)
Mean daily minimum °C (°F)	5.0 (41.0)	7.0 (44.6)	10.0 (50.0)	14.8 (58.6)	18.7 (65.7)	22.2 (72.0)	24.7 (76.5)	24.5 (76.1)	21.1 (70.0)	16.1 (61.0)	11.5 (52.7)	6.9 (44.4)	15.2 (59.4)
Record low °C (°F)	−2.1 (28.2)	−0.2 (31.6)	1.6 (34.9)	3.4 (38.1)	11.4 (52.5)	15.5 (59.9)	18.6 (65.5)	17.2 (63.0)	13.1 (55.6)	5.8 (42.4)	3.1 (37.6)	−3.4 (25.9)	−3.4 (25.9)
Average precipitation mm (inches)	10.9 (0.43)	24.9 (0.98)	42.6 (1.68)	87.5 (3.44)	142.2 (5.60)	143.4 (5.65)	166.7 (6.56)	132.4 (5.21)	108 (4.3)	86.2 (3.39)	46.9 (1.85)	14.9 (0.59)	1,006.6 (39.68)
Average precipitation days (≥ 0.1 mm)	5.4	6.4	10.3	13.4	14.4	12.9	13.0	11.0	10.7	12.3	9.1	6.9	125.8
Average snowy days	1.5	0.5	0.2	0	0	0	0	0	0	0	0	0.3	2.5
Average relative humidity (%)	65	63	63	66	70	71	71	67	68	72	71	69	68
Mean monthly sunshine hours	74.1	71.9	111.9	133.7	144.4	156.7	194.1	202.6	147.8	117.1	101.7	76.5	1,532.5
Percentage possible sunshine	23	23	30	34	34	37	45	50	40	34	32	24	34
Source: China Meteorological Administration

Climate data for Chengdu (Shuangliu District), elevation 495 m (1,624 ft), (1991–2020 normals, extremes 1951–present)
Month	Jan	Feb	Mar	Apr	May	Jun	Jul	Aug	Sep	Oct	Nov	Dec	Year
Record high °C (°F)	18.9 (66.0)	24.0 (75.2)	31.8 (89.2)	32.5 (90.5)	35.2 (95.4)	37.5 (99.5)	37.7 (99.9)	39.4 (102.9)	36.2 (97.2)	30.1 (86.2)	26.2 (79.2)	18.4 (65.1)	39.4 (102.9)
Mean daily maximum °C (°F)	9.8 (49.6)	12.7 (54.9)	17.5 (63.5)	23.3 (73.9)	27.0 (80.6)	28.9 (84.0)	30.6 (87.1)	30.6 (87.1)	26.2 (79.2)	21.3 (70.3)	16.7 (62.1)	11.2 (52.2)	21.3 (70.4)
Daily mean °C (°F)	6.0 (42.8)	8.5 (47.3)	12.6 (54.7)	17.6 (63.7)	21.6 (70.9)	24.2 (75.6)	25.8 (78.4)	25.5 (77.9)	21.9 (71.4)	17.5 (63.5)	12.8 (55.0)	7.5 (45.5)	16.8 (62.2)
Mean daily minimum °C (°F)	3.3 (37.9)	5.5 (41.9)	9.0 (48.2)	13.6 (56.5)	17.6 (63.7)	20.8 (69.4)	22.5 (72.5)	22.1 (71.8)	19.2 (66.6)	15.1 (59.2)	10.2 (50.4)	4.9 (40.8)	13.7 (56.6)
Record low °C (°F)	−6.5 (20.3)	−2.6 (27.3)	−1.8 (28.8)	4.0 (39.2)	6.3 (43.3)	14.2 (57.6)	16.6 (61.9)	16.0 (60.8)	12.2 (54.0)	3.1 (37.6)	0.2 (32.4)	−5.9 (21.4)	−6.5 (20.3)
Average precipitation mm (inches)	8.9 (0.35)	12.4 (0.49)	23.6 (0.93)	47.5 (1.87)	76.8 (3.02)	122.5 (4.82)	238.2 (9.38)	198.8 (7.83)	116.5 (4.59)	43.1 (1.70)	15.9 (0.63)	7.0 (0.28)	911.2 (35.89)
Average precipitation days (≥ 0.1 mm)	7.6	8.0	10.5	13.5	13.8	15.7	17.3	15.7	15.1	14.7	7.5	6.6	146
Average snowy days	1.1	0.4	0	0	0	0	0	0	0	0	0	0.2	1.7
Average relative humidity (%)	82	79	77	76	73	78	83	83	84	83	82	82	80
Mean monthly sunshine hours	38.3	54.7	85.2	116.0	122.1	110.7	122.1	132.9	70.5	54.9	47.7	37.7	992.8
Percentage possible sunshine	12	17	23	30	29	26	29	33	19	16	15	12	22
Source: China Meteorological Administration all-time extreme temperature

Climate data for Guiyang (Wudang District), elevation 1,104 m (3,622 ft), (1991–2020 normals, extremes 1951–present)
Month	Jan	Feb	Mar	Apr	May	Jun	Jul	Aug	Sep	Oct	Nov	Dec	Year
Record high °C (°F)	25.8 (78.4)	29.7 (85.5)	31.8 (89.2)	35.3 (95.5)	34.6 (94.3)	35.6 (96.1)	37.5 (99.5)	35.9 (96.6)	34.4 (93.9)	32.1 (89.8)	28.6 (83.5)	26.1 (79.0)	37.5 (99.5)
Mean daily maximum °C (°F)	8.2 (46.8)	11.7 (53.1)	16.2 (61.2)	21.5 (70.7)	24.4 (75.9)	26.2 (79.2)	28.4 (83.1)	28.7 (83.7)	25.7 (78.3)	20.2 (68.4)	16.2 (61.2)	10.6 (51.1)	19.8 (67.7)
Daily mean °C (°F)	4.6 (40.3)	7.3 (45.1)	11.2 (52.2)	16.2 (61.2)	19.5 (67.1)	21.9 (71.4)	23.8 (74.8)	23.5 (74.3)	20.6 (69.1)	16.0 (60.8)	11.7 (53.1)	6.6 (43.9)	15.2 (59.4)
Mean daily minimum °C (°F)	2.4 (36.3)	4.5 (40.1)	8.0 (46.4)	12.7 (54.9)	15.9 (60.6)	18.9 (66.0)	20.7 (69.3)	20.0 (68.0)	17.2 (63.0)	13.2 (55.8)	8.7 (47.7)	4.0 (39.2)	12.2 (53.9)
Record low °C (°F)	−7.8 (18.0)	−6.6 (20.1)	−3.5 (25.7)	0.1 (32.2)	6.3 (43.3)	10.4 (50.7)	12.1 (53.8)	13.1 (55.6)	8.1 (46.6)	3.3 (37.9)	−2.4 (27.7)	−6.6 (20.1)	−7.8 (18.0)
Average precipitation mm (inches)	28.7 (1.13)	22.9 (0.90)	44.8 (1.76)	82.3 (3.24)	172.6 (6.80)	227.7 (8.96)	201.1 (7.92)	125.6 (4.94)	85.3 (3.36)	94.2 (3.71)	41.1 (1.62)	22.1 (0.87)	1,148.4 (45.21)
Average precipitation days (≥ 0.1 mm)	15.4	12.7	15.4	15.2	16.6	16.8	15.6	14.1	10.8	15.0	11.0	12.9	171.5
Average snowy days	4.2	2.4	0.6	0	0	0	0	0	0	0	0.1	1.5	8.8
Average relative humidity (%)	83	78	78	76	77	82	79	77	77	81	80	78	79
Mean monthly sunshine hours	35.0	55.4	81.6	107.7	120.0	98.8	156.1	171.3	131.5	82.0	77.1	53.6	1,170.1
Percentage possible sunshine	11	17	22	28	29	24	37	43	36	23	24	17	26
Source: China Meteorological Administration

Climate data for Kunming, elevation 1,888 m (6,194 ft), (1991–2020 normals, extremes 1951–present)
Month	Jan	Feb	Mar	Apr	May	Jun	Jul	Aug	Sep	Oct	Nov	Dec	Year
Record high °C (°F)	24.0 (75.2)	26.0 (78.8)	28.8 (83.8)	32.1 (89.8)	32.9 (91.2)	32.5 (90.5)	31.0 (87.8)	30.9 (87.6)	30.4 (86.7)	29.1 (84.4)	26.4 (79.5)	25.1 (77.2)	32.9 (91.2)
Mean daily maximum °C (°F)	16.3 (61.3)	18.5 (65.3)	21.8 (71.2)	24.3 (75.7)	25.2 (77.4)	25.4 (77.7)	24.8 (76.6)	25.0 (77.0)	23.5 (74.3)	21.1 (70.0)	18.7 (65.7)	16.0 (60.8)	23.5 (74.3)
Daily mean °C (°F)	9.3 (48.7)	11.5 (52.7)	14.8 (58.6)	17.8 (64.0)	19.6 (67.3)	20.7 (69.3)	20.5 (68.9)	20.2 (68.4)	18.8 (65.8)	16.2 (61.2)	12.5 (54.5)	9.5 (49.1)	16.0 (60.8)
Mean daily minimum °C (°F)	4.0 (39.2)	5.8 (42.4)	8.9 (48.0)	12.0 (53.6)	14.9 (58.8)	17.3 (63.1)	17.6 (63.7)	17.2 (63.0)	15.7 (60.3)	12.9 (55.2)	8.2 (46.8)	4.8 (40.6)	11.6 (52.9)
Record low °C (°F)	−5.7 (21.7)	−2.6 (27.3)	−5.2 (22.6)	−0.2 (31.6)	5.1 (41.2)	8.8 (47.8)	10.1 (50.2)	10.4 (50.7)	5.4 (41.7)	0.1 (32.2)	−2.4 (27.7)	−7.8 (18.0)	−7.8 (18.0)
Average precipitation mm (inches)	23.8 (0.94)	11.9 (0.47)	19.6 (0.77)	25.4 (1.00)	80.1 (3.15)	173.1 (6.81)	215.7 (8.49)	195.9 (7.71)	119.3 (4.70)	82.4 (3.24)	30.1 (1.19)	13.7 (0.54)	991.0 (39.02)
Average precipitation days (≥ 0.1 mm)	4.3	3.7	5.4	6.5	11.1	16.5	19.7	18.9	13.9	12.0	5.3	3.7	121.0
Average snowy days	1.0	0.4	0.2	0	0	0	0	0	0	0	0.1	0.4	2.1
Average relative humidity (%)	66	58	54	55	64	75	79	78	78	78	74	71	69
Mean monthly sunshine hours	223.6	223.9	253.3	252.2	217.2	148.0	122.6	142.9	127.1	143.2	191.5	195.4	2,240.9
Percentage possible sunshine	67	70	68	66	52	36	29	36	35	40	59	60	52
Source 1: China Meteorological Administration
Source 2: The Yearbook of Indochina (1937-1938, extremes 1907-1938)

== Gallery ==
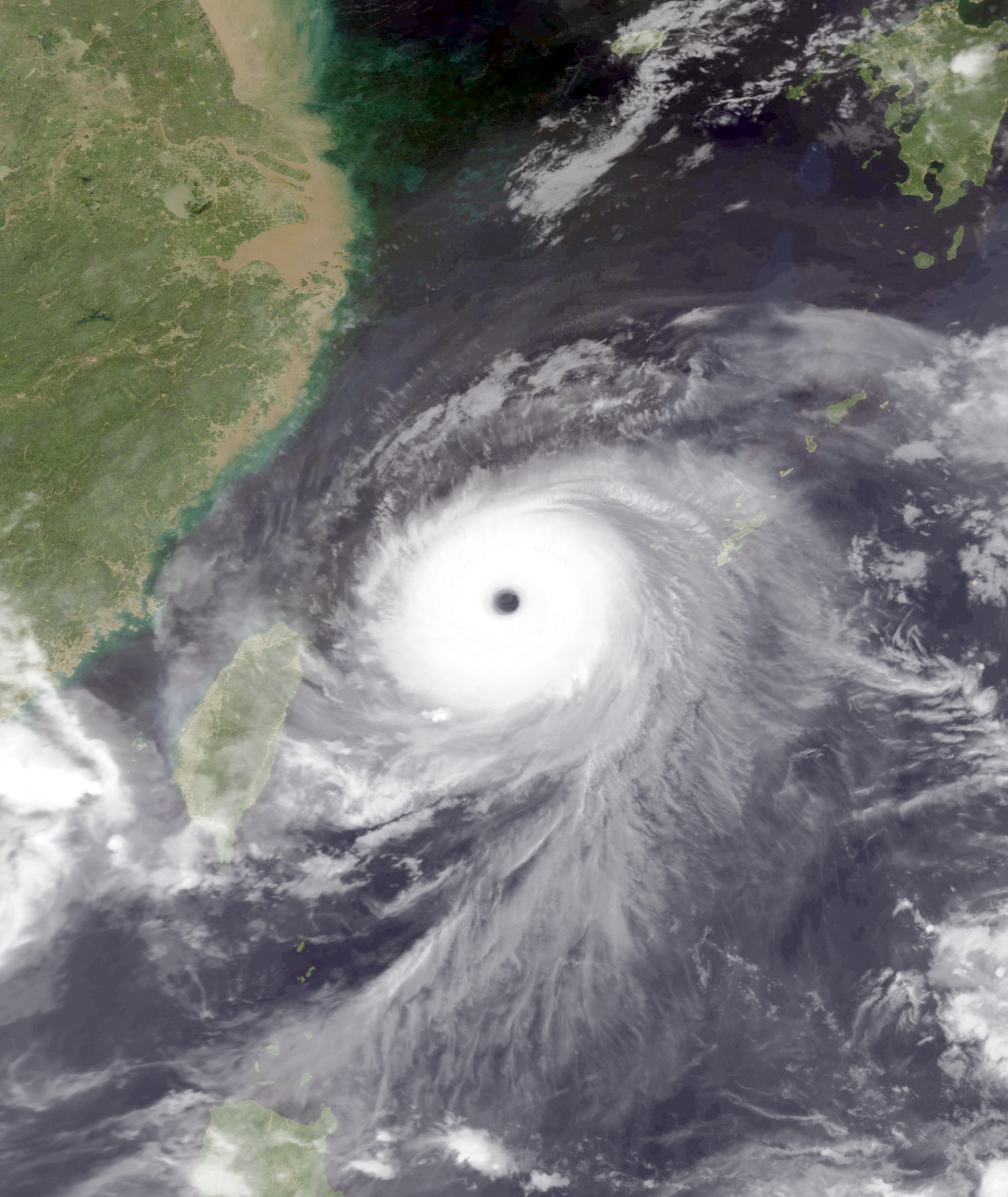
Typhoon Saomai was one of the most powerful typhoons to hit China.

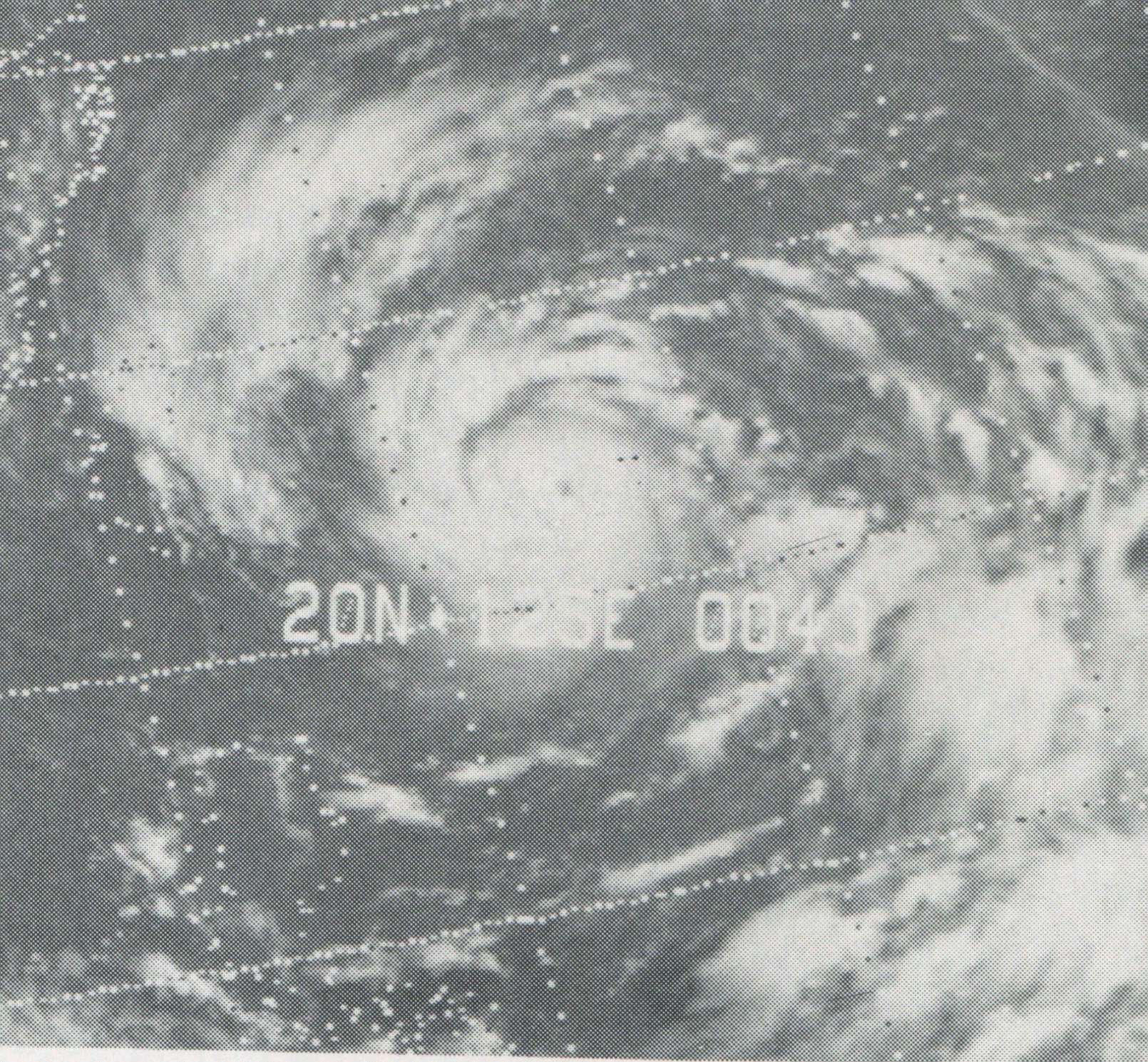
Typhoon Nina on August 2, 1975.

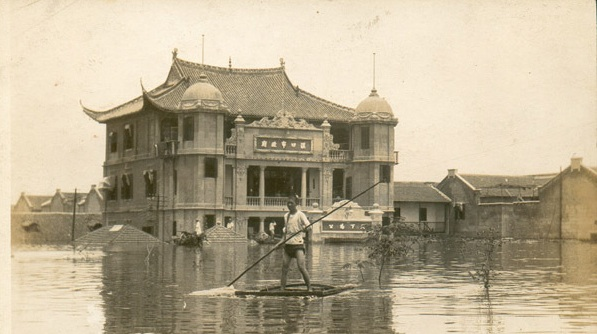
Flooding in China during the 1931 floods

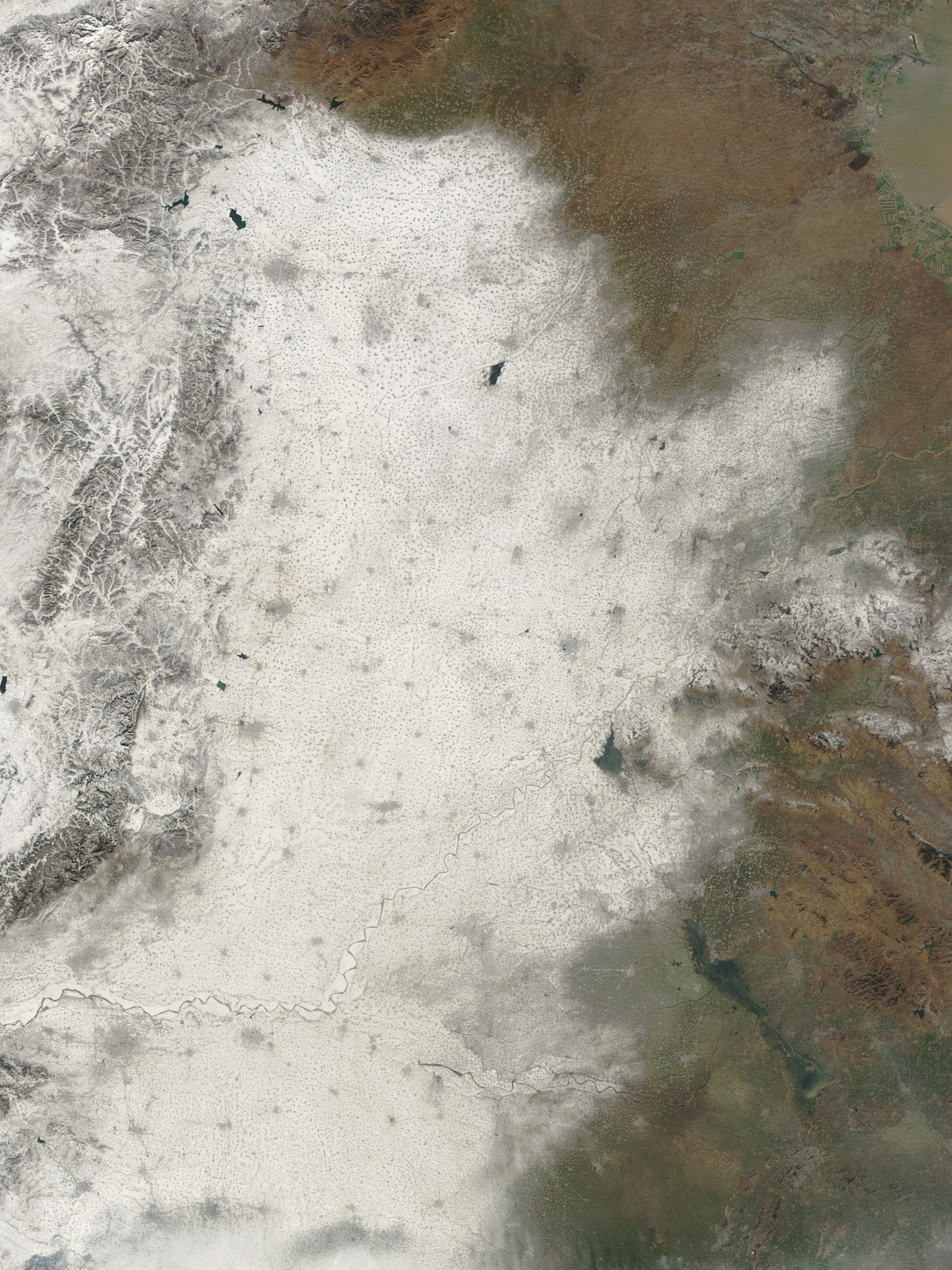
Early-season snow covering part of the North China Plain near Shijiazhuang, Hebei

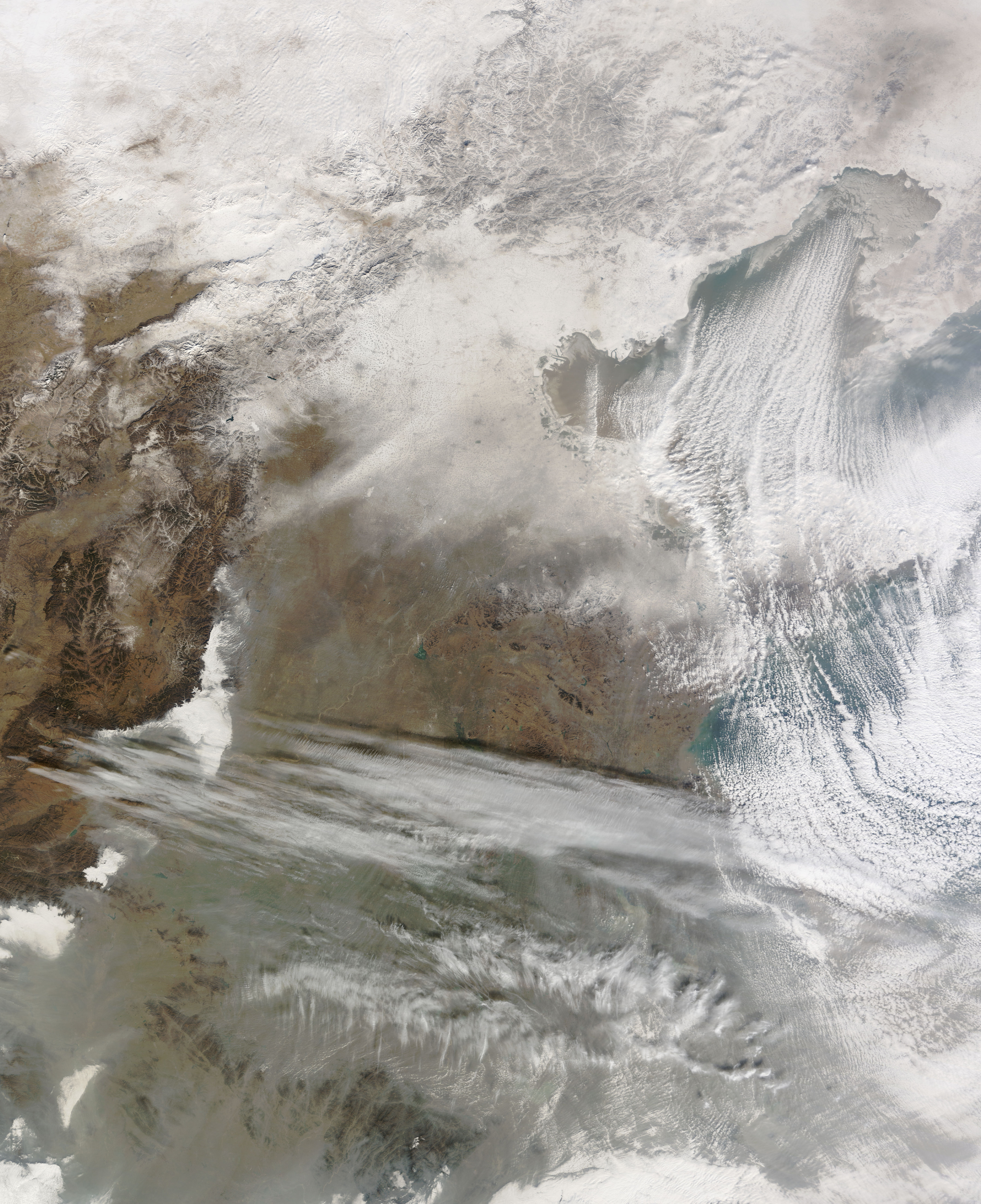
Snow encircling the area around the Bo Hai

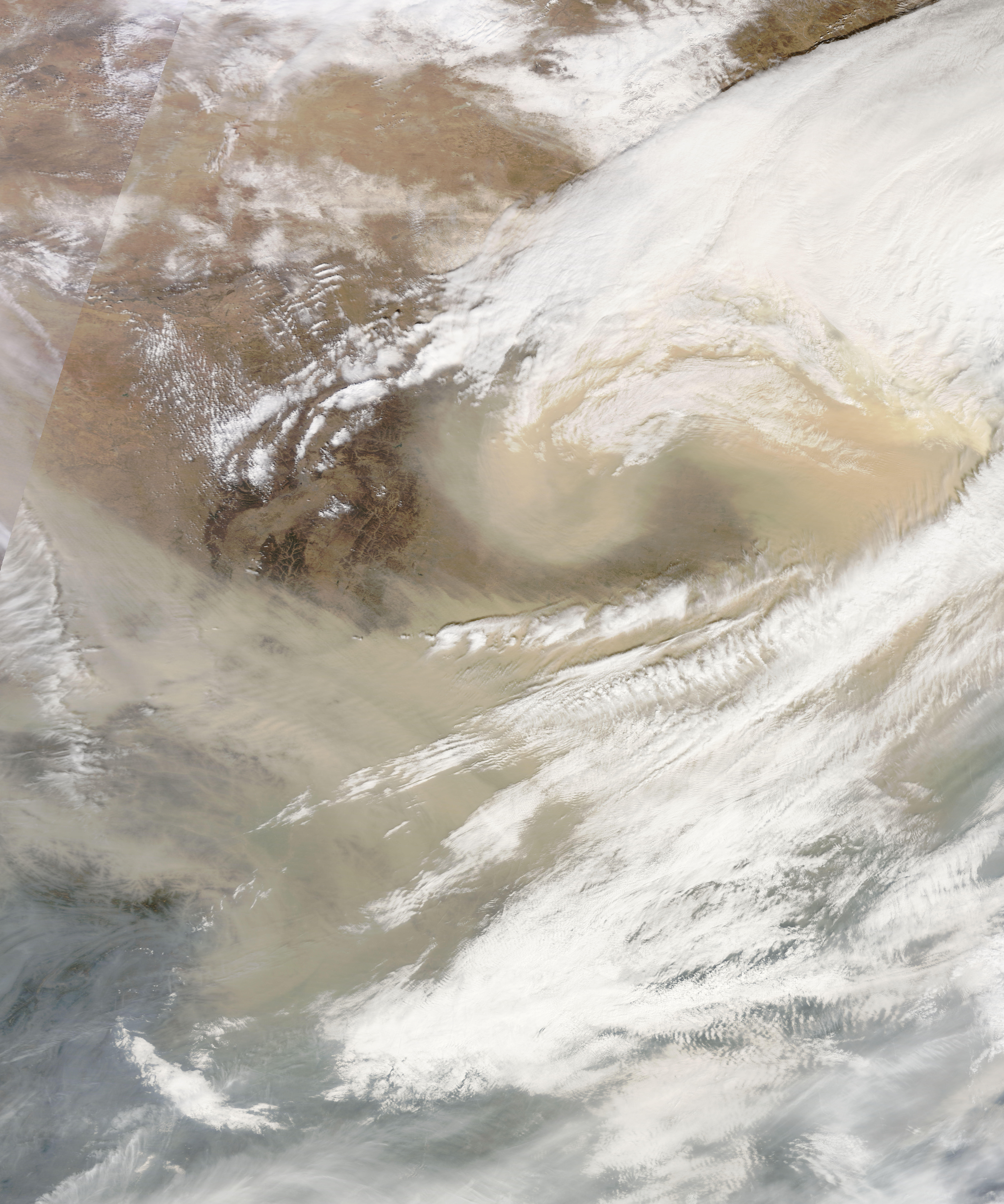
A sandstorm blowing from Inner Mongolia in 2010

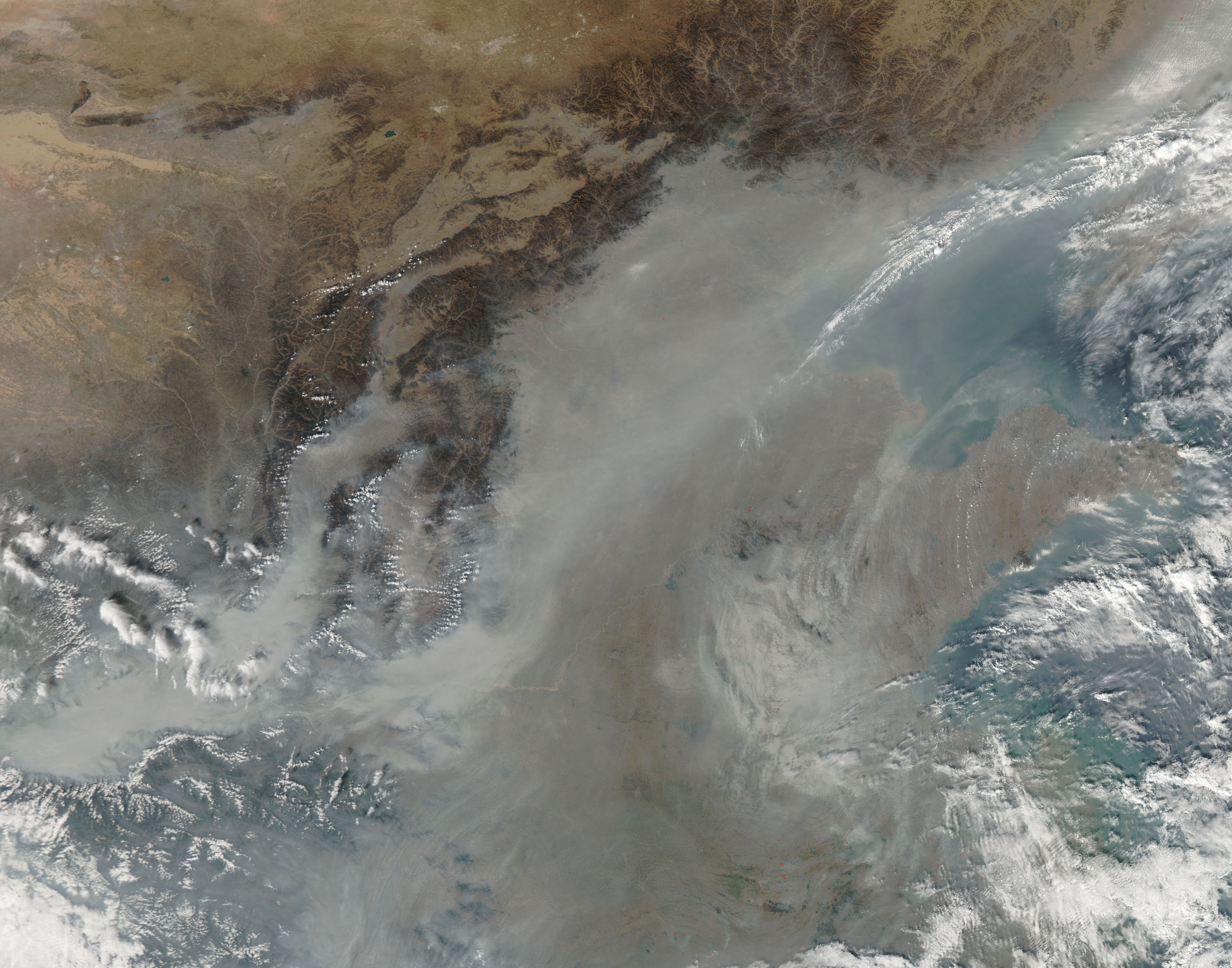
Haze over the North China Plain and the Lüliang Mountains of Shanxi

== See also ==
- Geography of China
- Climate change in China
- Environmental issues in China
- Geography of Taiwan
- East Asia
- East Asian monsoon
- Hot summer cold winter zone
- List of China tornadoes
