= Okhotsk (disambiguation) =

Okhotsk (Russian: Охо́тск)is an urban-type settlement in Khabarovsk Krai, Russia

Okhotsk may also refer to:

== Russia ==
- Sea of Okhotsk, a sea named after the Russian settlement
- Okhotsk Airport, an airport in Okhotsk
- Okhotsk High, a high pressure system over the sea
- Okhotsk Plate, a tectonic plate

== Japan ==
- Okhotsk Subprefecture (オホーツク総合振興局, Ohōtsuku-sōgō-shinkō-kyoku), a Hokkaidō subprefecture in Japan, named after the Sea of Okhotsk
- Okhotsk (train), a train service between Sapporo and Abashiri
- Okhotsk Monbetsu Airport, an airport in Monbetsu, Hokkaidō
- Okhotsk Fuji, an alternative name of Mount Shari

== Other uses ==
- Okhotsk culture, archaeological culture in the lands surrounding the Sea of Okhotsk
- Okhotsk (crater), a crater on Mars
- 4042 Okhotsk, a main-belt asteroid discovered at Kitami Observatory

== See also ==
- Okhotsky (disambiguation)
