= East Asian monsoon =

Monsoon in East Asia

The East Asian monsoon is a monsoonal flow that carries moist air from the Indian Ocean and Pacific Ocean to East Asia. It affects approximately one-third of the global population, influencing the climate of China, Japan, Vietnam, the Korean Peninsula, Taiwan, the Philippines, and mainland Southeast Asia. It is driven by temperature differences between the East Asian continent and the Pacific Ocean. The East Asian monsoon is divided into a warm and wet summer monsoon and a cold and dry winter monsoon. This cold and dry winter monsoon is responsible for the aeolian dust deposition and pedogenesis that resulted in the creation of the Loess Plateau. The monsoon influences weather patterns as far north as Siberia, causing wet summers that contrast with the cold and dry winters caused by the Siberian High, which counterbalances the monsoon's effect on latitudes in the north.

In most years, the monsoonal flow shifts in a very predictable pattern, with winds being southeastern in late June, bringing significant rainfall to the region, resulting in the East Asian rainy season as the monsoon boundary advances northward during the spring and summer. This leads to a reliable precipitation spike in July and August. However, this pattern occasionally fails, leading to drought and crop failure. In the winter, the winds are northeasterly and the monsoonal precipitation bands move back to the south, and intense precipitation occurs over South China and Taiwan.

Over Japan and Korea, the monsoon boundary typically takes the form of a quasi-stationary front separating the cooler air mass associated with the Okhotsk High to the north from the hot, humid air mass associated with the subtropical ridge to the south. After the monsoon boundary passes north of a given location, it is not uncommon for daytime temperatures to exceed 32 °C (90 °F) with dewpoints of 24 °C (75 °F) or higher. The spring-summer rainy season is referred to as "plum rain" in various languages of East Asia. In Japan the monsoon boundary is referred to as the tsuyu (梅雨) as it advances northward during the spring, while it is referred to as the shurin when the boundary retreats back southward during the autumn months. The East Asian monsoon is known as meiyu (梅雨) in China and Taiwan, and jangma (장마) in Korea.

The location and strength of the East Asian monsoon has varied during the Holocene which scientists track using pollen and dust.

== See also ==
- East Asian rainy season
- List of China-related topics
- List of Japan-related topics
- List of South Korea-related topics
- Monsoon of South Asia

== Sources ==
- Takao, Yoshikane; Fujio, Kimura; Seita, Emori (2001). "Numerical Study on the Baiu Front Genesis by Heating Contrast between Land and Ocean". Journal of the Meteorological Society of Japan. 79 (2): 671–686. Bibcode:2001JMeSJ..79..671Y. doi:10.2151/jmsj.79.671. ISSN 0026-1165. OCLC 819392837.
