= Okhotsky =

Okhotsky (masculine), Okhotskaya (feminine), or Okhotskoye (neuter) may refer to:

- Okhotsky District, a district of Khabarovsk Krai, Russia
- Okhotsk plate (Okhotskaya plita), a tectonic plate
- Sea of Okhotsk (Okhotskoye more), a sea in the western Pacific Ocean

== See also ==
- Okhotsk (disambiguation)
