= Three Furnaces =

Cities in China with hot weather in summer

The term Three Furnaces (or Three Furnace-like Cities) (simplified Chinese: 三大火炉; traditional Chinese: 三大火爐; pinyin: sān dà huǒlú) refers to the especially hot and oppressively humid summer weather in several major cities in the Yangtze River Valley, within China. It was coined during the ROC period of China, and refers to the following cities:

- Chongqing
- Wuhan
- Nanjing

Sometimes, Changsha or Nanchang are added, making the Four Furnaces (四大火炉). In addition to the above 5 cities, Hangzhou and Shanghai are added to form the Seven Furnaces (七大火炉).

Yet the above names originate mainly from popular opinion, not necessarily on the basis of data. Meteorologists only give the title "Three Furnaces" to Fuzhou, Hangzhou, and Chongqing. The next seven hottest cities (2000—2009), are Changsha, Wuhan, Haikou, Nanchang, Guangzhou, Xi'an, and Nanning. Unlike the other cities, Xi'an, the capital of Shaanxi province, lies within the northwest.

== See also ==
- Yangtze River
