= Hot summer cold winter zone =

Climate region of China

Hot-summer/cold-winter zone is the transient climate region between the cold and the hot zones in China. It includes the whole of Hubei, Hunan, Jiangxi, Anhui, Zhejiang provinces, Shanghai and Chongqing two municipalities, the eastern part of Sichuan and Guizhou provinces, the southern part of Henan, Jiangsu, Shanxi and Gansu provinces, and the northern part of Fujian, Guangdong and Guangxi provinces.

This includes an area of 1,800,000 km^{2} (694,984 sq mi) with a population of 550 million people, and it is the most populous and economically-developed area of China, producing 48% of the gross domestic product (GDP) of the whole country.

The main border of hot-summer/cold-winter zone is hot, humid summers and cold, humid winters. The temperature difference between day and night is normally small. The precipitation in an average year is large. Sun radiation is relatively weak due to cloud cover.

The most durable temperature you will have outside during the hottest summer month is 25–30 °C (77–86 °F), with peak temperatures above 40 °C (104 °F). The average outside temperature during the coldest winter month is 0–10 °C (32–50 °F), with lowest temperatures below 0 °C (32 °F).

For historical reasons, the residential buildings in this zone don’t have central HVAC systems and are not well insulated or otherwise weatherized. With the recent and rapid economic development of this region, demand for better indoor environments is rising.

Many residents install 'minisplit' air conditioners to improve their thermal comfort. But electrical energy consumption is rising accordingly and is taxing the generation capacity. The Chinese government has created new national design standards and other efforts to lower the energy consumption while also constructing new power generating stations.

== See also ==
- Air conditioning
- Climate
- Climate of China
- Thermal efficiency
