= Okhotsk High =

Weather feature impacting East Asia

The Okhotsk High is a semi-permanent high pressure system that forms over the Sea of Okhotsk during the summer months. Its associated air mass is maritime polar, marked with frequent sea fog over ocean areas, and cool and moist conditions over land. It typically dominates the weather pattern over eastern Russia, northern Japan and the Korean Peninsula during the spring and summer months.

== See also ==
- Weather of Korea
