= Lykov family =

Russian family of Old Believers

Coordinates: 51.46087°N 88.42713°E

Lykov Лыков
- Family
- Country: Russia
- Current region: Abakan Range
- Members: Agafia
- Traditions: Old Believers

Location of the Lykov family's settlement in Russia

The Lykov family (Russian: Лыков, romanized: Lykov) is a Russian family of Old Believers. The family of six spent 42 years in partial isolation from society in an otherwise uninhabited upland of Abakan Range, in Tashtypsky District of Khakassia (southern Siberia). Since 1988, only one member, Agafia Lykova, survives.

In a 2019 interview, Agafia explained how locals were in contact with the family through the years. In the 1950s, there was a newspaper article about their family. Their story became well known following the 1994 publication of Lost in the Taiga: One Russian Family's Fifty-Year Struggle for Survival and Religious Freedom in the Siberian Wilderness by journalist Vasily Peskov.

== History ==
In 1936, the Lykovs’ religion was under threat. Karp Lykov's brother was killed by a Soviet patrol. Karp and Akulina Lykov, with their two children, Savin and Natalia, fled eastward from their hometown of Lykovo (Tyumen Oblast).

Two more children, Dmitry and Agafia, were born during the isolation. The family ended up in a dwelling in the taiga, near the Yerinat River (Abakan River basin), 250 kilometres (160 mi) from any settlement.

In 1978, their location was discovered by a helicopter pilot, who was flying a geological group into the region. The geologists made contact with the family, but the Lykovs decided not to leave the place.

Akulina starved to death in 1961, sacrificing herself during a period of intense food shortage, so that her children might survive. Three of the children died in 1981: Savin and Natalia suffered from kidney failure, most likely a result of their harsh diet, while Dmitry died of pneumonia. Karp died in 1988.

The remaining family member, Agafia Lykova, has over the years accumulated a herd of goats and a flock of chickens, and has built herself a decent hut. For 18 years, Agafia lived with one of the geologists, Yerofei Sedov. She has remarked to Vice News on his uselessness and how she had to supply him with water. Yerofei died on 3 May 2015. In that same year, Agafia received a helper, 53-year-old Georgy Danilov from Orenburg, who came to her residence answering an open letter she had written requesting such. In 2016, she was airlifted out to a hospital in Tashtagol, Russia, from her remote location near the Russian borders with Kazakhstan and with Mongolia. Her condition is related to cartilage deterioration in her lower extremities. Agafia was treated at a hospital in Tashtagol and has since returned to the wilderness, where she still lives as of 2025.

== Family members ==
Parents:

- Karp Osipovich Lykov (c. 1901 – 16 February 1988; Russian: Карп Лыков)
- Akulina Lykov (c. 1900 – 16 February 1961; Акулина Лыкова)

Children:

- Savin (c. 1927–1981) (Савин)
- Natalia (c. 1934–1981) (Наталия)
- Dmitriy (1940–1981) (Дмитрий)
- Agafia (born 1944) (Агафья)

== Media ==
The story of the Lykov family was told by the journalist Vasily Peskov in his book Lost in the Taiga: One Russian Family's Fifty-Year Struggle for Survival and Religious Freedom in the Siberian Wilderness (1994). Peskov had written a series of reports on the family in the Komsomolskaya Pravda newspaper in 1982. The book became a bestseller in France, and the film rights were acquired by director Jean-Jacques Annaud.

Far Out: Agafia's Taiga Life is a documentary film about Agafia Lykova at the age of 70.

Agafia is a documentary film about Agafia Lykova, produced by RT (Russia Today). It chronicles the history of Old Believers in Russia, the difficulties experienced by the documentary crew in travelling to Agafia's residence, the history of the Lykov family, animosity between Agafia and Yerofei Sedov, and Agafia's life in the taiga.

During her isolation during the COVID-19 pandemic, author Elizabeth Gilbert heard about the family and was inspired to write a novel, The Snow Forest. However, publication of the book was put on indefinite hold following public criticism, mostly from Ukrainians, that a book about Russia would be released during the Russian invasion of Ukraine.
