= Agafia Lykova =

Member of the hermit Russian Old Believer Lykov family

Coordinates: 51.46100°N 88.42687°E

- Born: 9 April 1945 (age 81); Khakas Autonomous Oblast, Russian SFSR, Soviet Union
- Spouse(s): Unknown husband (date of marriage unknown)
- Parents: Karp Osipovich Lykov, (father); Akulina Karpovna Lykova (mother)

Agafia Karpovna Lykova (Russian: Агафья Карповна Лыкова; born 9 April 1945) is a Russian Old Believer, part of the Lykov family, who has lived alone in the taiga for most of her life. As of 2016, she resides in the Western Sayan mountains, in the Republic of Khakassia. Lykova became a national phenomenon in the early 1980s when Vasily Peskov published articles about her family and their extreme isolation from the rest of society. Lykova is the sole surviving member of the family and has been mostly self-sufficient since 1988, when her father died.

Lykov family settlement

== Early life ==
Lykova was born in a hollowed out pine washtub in 1945 to Karp Osipovich Lykov and Akulina Lykova. She was their fourth child, and the second to be born in the taiga.

Lykova lives at 3,444 ft (1,050 m) on a remote mountainside in the Abakan Range, 150 mi (240 km) from the nearest town. For the first 35 years of her life Lykova did not have contact with anyone outside of her immediate family. Information about the outside world came from her father's stories and the family's Russian Orthodox Bible.

In the summer of 1978 a group of four geologists discovered the family by chance while circling the area in a helicopter. The scientists reported that Lykova spoke a language "distorted by a lifetime of isolation" that sounded akin to a "slow, blurred cooing". This unusual speech led to the misconception that Lykova was mentally disabled. Later, after observing her skill in hunting, cooking, sewing, reading and construction, this original misconception was revised. Peskov's book reports that Lykova's vocabulary expanded as she made further contact with the larger world and he reports many of her uses of "unexpected" words in conversation.

== Isolation ==
In 70 years, Lykova has ventured out of the family settlement six times. The first time was in the 1980s, shortly after Vasily Peskov's articles about the family's isolation turned them into a national phenomenon. The Soviet government paid for her to tour the Soviet Union for a month, during which time she saw airplanes, horses, cars and money for the first time. Since then, she has left only to seek medical treatment, visit distant relatives and meet other Old Believers.

Lykova prefers her life in the taiga to life in the larger towns or cities. She claims that the air and water outside of the taiga make her ill. She also said that she finds the busy roads frightening. In 2014 Agafia formally rejoined the Belokrinitskaya branch of the Old Believers during a visit by Metropolitan Korniliy (Titov) coinciding with her 69th birthday. In 2014 she wrote a letter, which was published online, requesting anyone to come to her home to be her helper as her "strength is going". She claimed in that letter to have "a lump on [her] right breast", a possible sign that she has developed cancer.

In January 2016 it was reported that Lykova was airlifted to a hospital with leg pain. Agafia was treated at a hospital in Tashtagol and planned to return to the wilderness once emergency services were able to airlift her home. According to The Siberian Times she did and as of 2019 was still living there. In 2021 it was reported that the oligarch Oleg Deripaska had paid for the construction of a new cabin in the wilderness for her to live in due to the deterioration of her previous dwelling.

Lykova now lives with the assistance of a park ranger and substantial state support.

== Relationships ==
During her talks with Peskov, Lykova told him she was married to someone during one of her trips outside of the taiga. No further information was offered. According to another source, her husband was a distant cousin; he lived with her for a time in the taiga, but departed after a disagreement.

For 18 years, Lykova had a neighbour, Yerofei Sedov (one of the geologists who visited the area). Sedov told Vice journalists that he came to the taiga to help Lykova. Due to his old age and disability, however, he heavily relied on Lykova for food and firewood throughout his stay. While the two were generally on friendly terms, there were two occasions where Lykova says that Sedov threatened her and "behaved sinfully". Sedov died on 3 May 2015, at the age of 77.

== See also ==
- Lykov family
- Richard Proenneke, spent 30 years at Twin Lakes in the Alaskan wilderness
