= Lost in the Taiga =

Book by Vasiliy Peskov

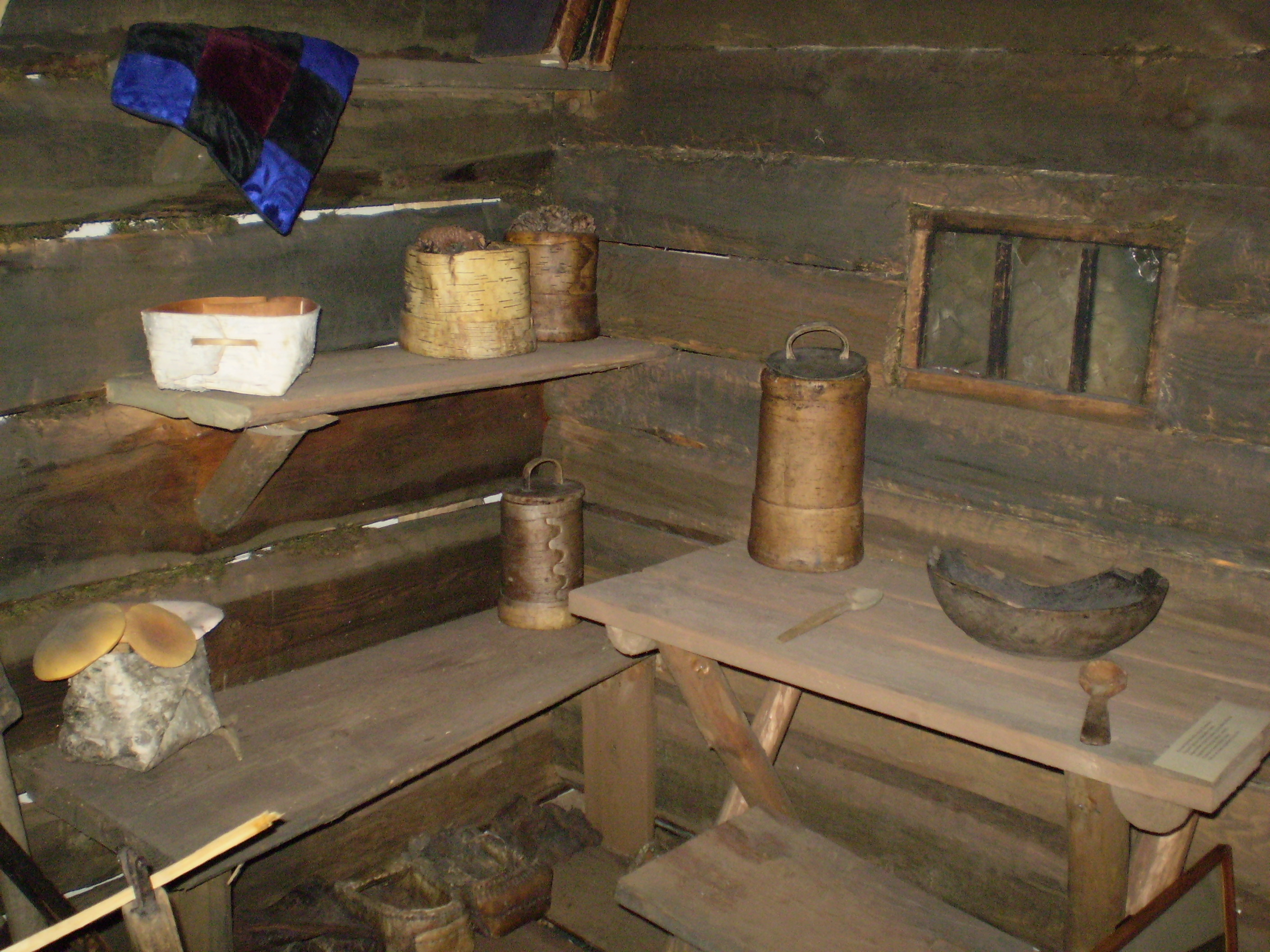

Lost in the Taiga: One Russian Family's Fifty-Year Struggle for Survival and Religious Freedom in the Siberian Wilderness is a non-fiction book written by Vasily Peskov about the Lykov family.

The book was written and published in USSR in 1983 under the title "Таёжный тупик" ("Taezhny Tupik") based on the series of reports on the family in the Komsomolskaya Pravda newspaper in 1982 by the same journalist. It was first published in Europe in 1990 and then by Doubleday in 1994. Film rights were later acquired by director Jean Jacques Annaud.

The Lykovs were a Russian family who became famous for spending over 50 years in complete isolation in the south of Siberia due to disagreements regarding religion (Lykovs were Old Believers, an Eastern Orthodox denomination). The family had fled in 1936 to Siberia and over the next few years had lived in a series of ever-more isolated dwellings in the Taiga. The Lykov family was discovered by geologists in 1978 and become a phenomenon in 1982 when Peskov wrote a series of articles on the family in the Komsomolskaya Pravda newspaper. By 1990, Peskov had expanded the articles into a book.
