= Poronaysky Nature Reserve =

Strict nature reserve in Sakhalin Oblast, Russia

- Russian: Поронайский заповедник (Also: Poronaisky)
- IUCN category Ia (strict nature reserve)
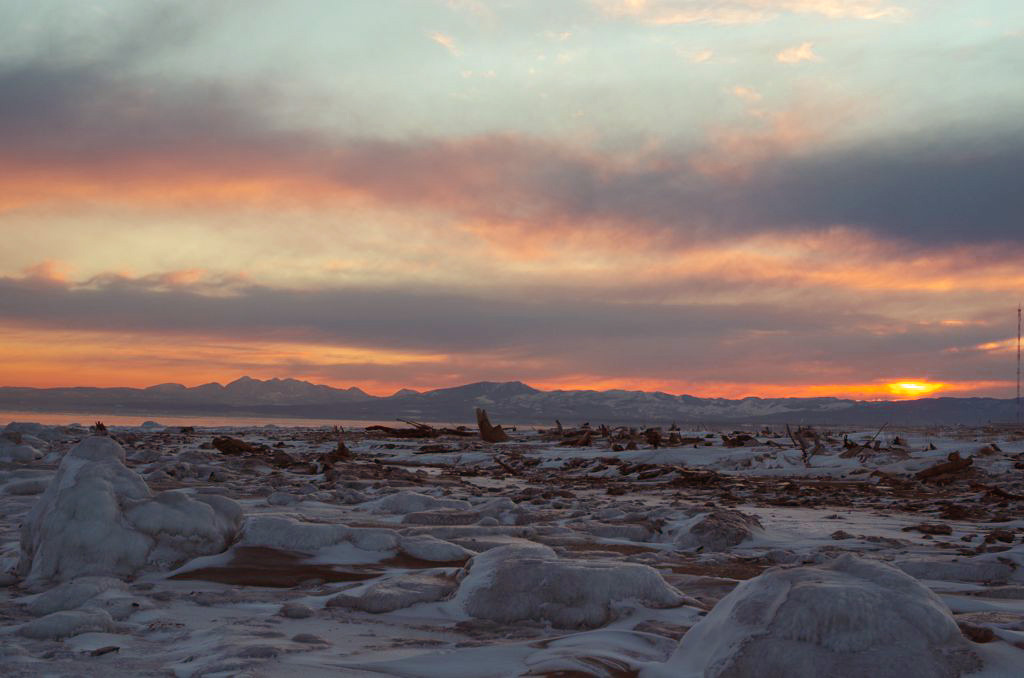
- Poronaysky Zapovednik

- Location within Russia
- Location: Sakhalin Oblast
- Nearest city: Poronaysk
- Coordinates: 48°55′34″N 144°30′32″E
- Area: 56,695 hectares (140,096 acres; 219 sq mi)
- Established: 1988
- Governing body: Ministry of Natural Resources and Environment (Russia)
- Website: http://www.zapovednik-65.ru/

Poronaysky Nature Reserve (Russian: Поронайский заповедник) (also Poronaisky) is a Russian 'zapovednik' (strict nature reserve) covering Cape Patience, on the eastern side of Sakhalin Island in the Russian Far East. A specific purpose of the reserve is to protect rookeries for arctic birds on Cape Patience, which is a 65 km peninsula extending into the Okhotsk Sea. The reserve includes the southern part of the East Sakhalin Mountains, and the widest part of the Tym-Poronaisk dale. The reserve is situated in the Poronaysky District of Sakhalin Oblast, 50 km east of the regional city of Poronaysk. It was formally established in 1988, and covers 56,695 ha (218.90 sq mi).

== Topography ==
The Poronaysky Reserve is bounded on the north by central Sakhalin Island, on the east and south by the Okhostsk Sea, and on the west by Gulf of Patience. The Poronay River does not actually run through the reserve, rather it flows into the Gulf of Patience just to the west of the protected territory. The reserve has a dense network of smaller rivers on plains, with a number of lakes.

There are two separate sites in Poronaysky, separated by 20 km:

- Nevsky. Located at the northern end of the Gulf of Patience, in the Tym-Poronai lowlands, with hilly terrain.
- Okhotsk. Located to the east of the Nevsky site, on southern tip of Sakhalin Range of the East Sakhalin Mountains, and Cape Patience. The highest point is 350 meters above sea level.

== Climate and ecoregion ==
Poronaysky is located in the Sakhalin Island taiga ecoregion. This ecoregion covers all of Sakhalin Island except for the southern tip. The island separates the Sea of Okhotsk from the Sea of Japan. The island is often connected to the Russian mainland by ice across a five-mile strait. The ecoregion is characterized by wet subarctic coniferous forest dominated by spruce and fir trees on the edge of tundra.

The climate of Poronaysky is Subarctic climate, without dry season (Köppen climate classification Subarctic climate (Dfc)). This climate is characterized by mild summers (only 1–3 months above 10 °C (50.0 °F)) and cold, snowy winters (coldest month below −3 °C (26.6 °F)). In Poronaysky, there are over 100 rainstorms per year (average precipitation 600 mm/year), with frequent fog in the summer. The average air temperature in January is 18.1 °C (64.6 °F), in July 12.6 °C (54.7 °F).

== Flora and fauna ==
The plant life of the reserve is that of wet subarctic coniferous forest. Dominant trees are spruce and fir, with some larch forests. The treeless areas are sometimes called "tundra" for some physical resemblance to true tundra, by in fact contain extensive peat bogs up to 6 meters thick. Characteristic plants are sedges, grasses, and plants with underground runners. The spruce-fir forests are mossy and have little undergrowth. Scientists on the reserve have recorded 400 species of vascular plants.

The animal life of the reserve reflects the position of Sakhalin Island as being at times connected or unconnected to the mainland. Fauna communities of Amur, Kamchatka, and Japanese regions are found. the Sakhalin Musk Deer is an example of a subspecies that has developed in isolation, and is endemic to the island. Common mammals include the brown bear, fox, otter, mink, hare and Siberian Chipmunk. Scientists on the reserve have recorded over 50 species of mammals, 231 of birds, 4 of amphibians, and one species of reptile.

== Ecoeducation and access ==
As a strict nature reserve, the Poronaysky Reserve is mostly closed to the general public, although scientists and those with 'environmental education' purposes can make arrangements with park management for visits. There are several 'ecotourist' routes in the reserve, however, that are open to the public. These require permits to be obtained in advance. Because vehicles are not allowed, some of the multi-day guided hiking trips require a degree of physical fitness to complete. There is a public nature museum at the main office is in the city of Poronaysk.

== See also ==
- List of Russian Nature Reserves (class 1a 'zapovedniks')
- National Parks of Russia
