= Sakhalin Island taiga =

Ecoregion which covers most of Sakhalin Island, Russia

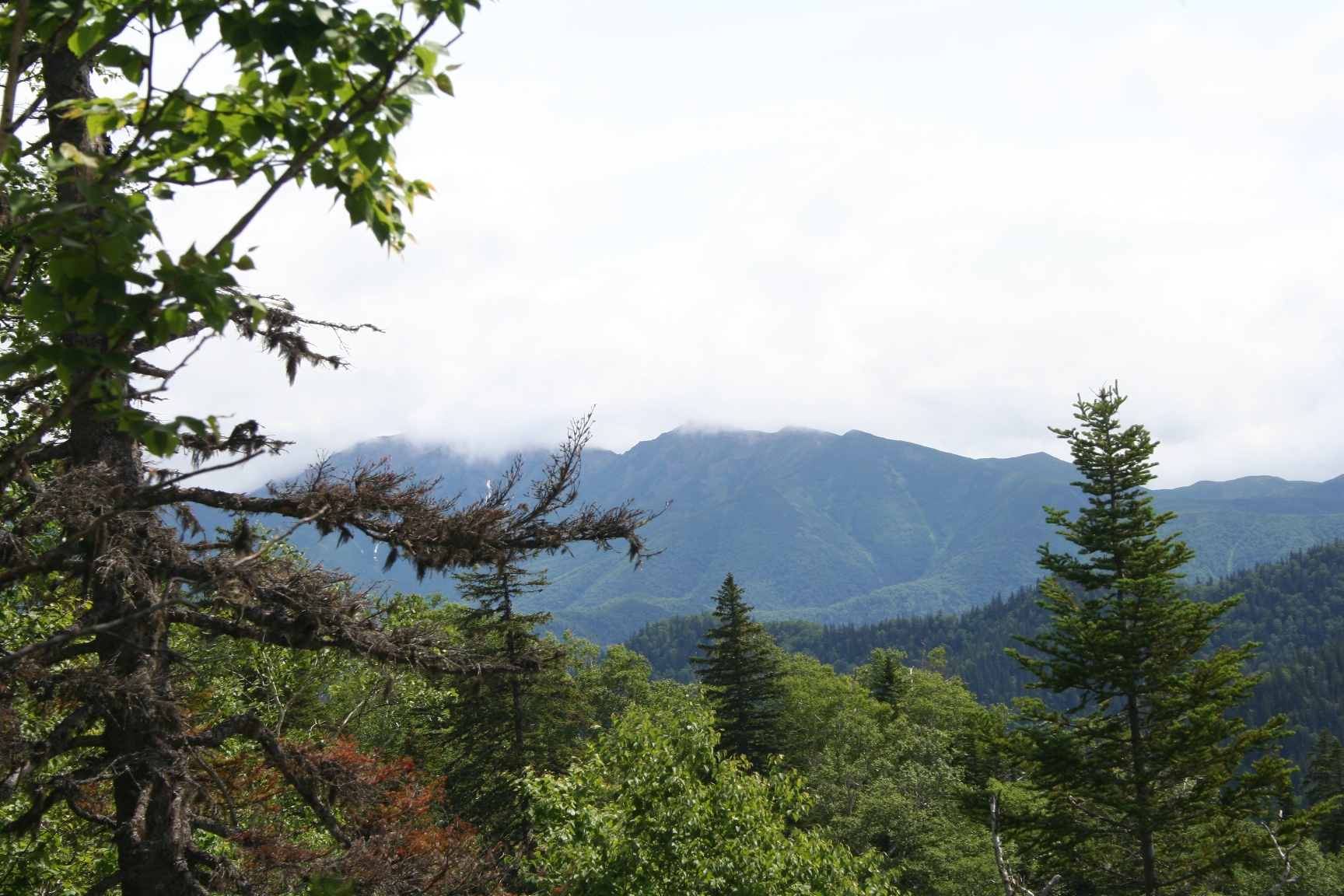
- Pilengovskogo ridge, Sakhalin Island

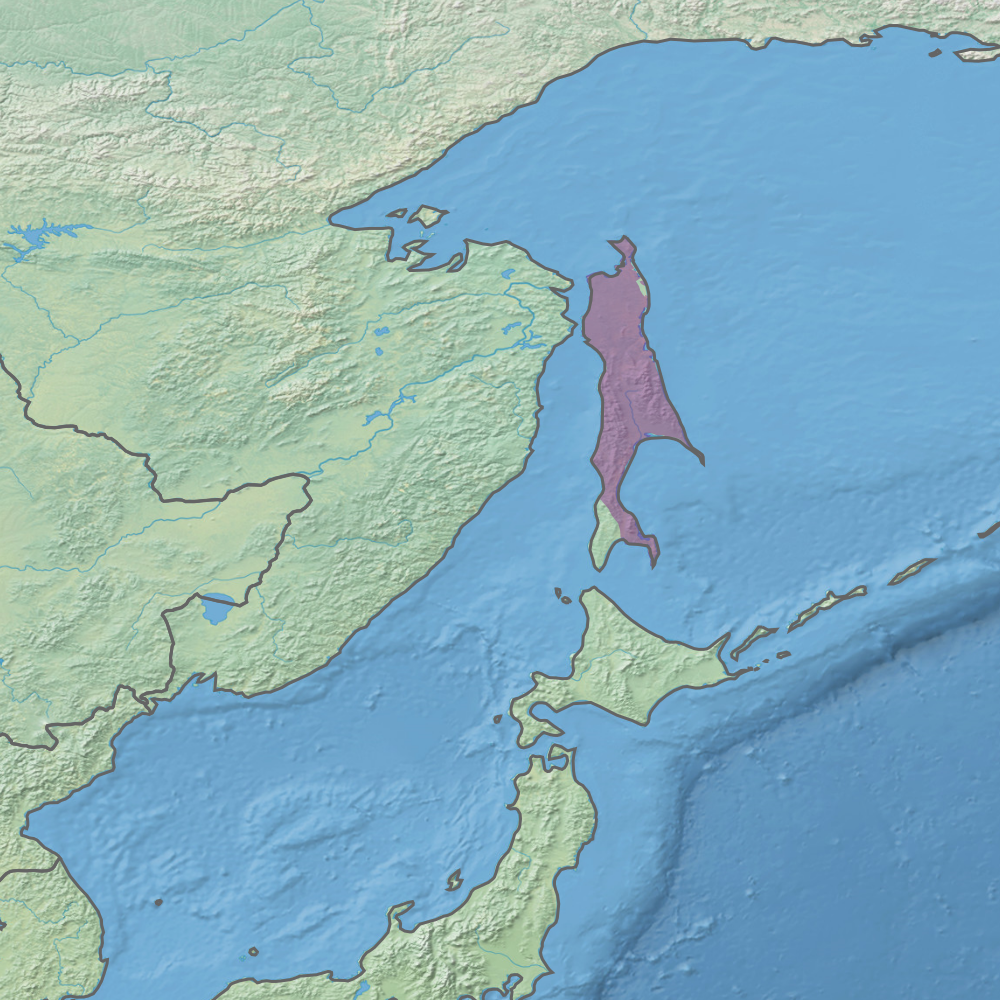
- Ecoregion territory (in purple)

Ecology
- Realm: Palearctic
- Biome: Boreal forests/taiga

Geography
- Area: 403,504.46 km^{2} (155,793.94 sq mi)
- Climate type: Dfc

The Sakhalin Island taiga ecoregion (WWF ID: PA0607) covers most of Sakhalin Island, the largest island of Russia, which is separated from the mainland by the Sea of Okhotsk and the Sea of Japan. The region is one of taiga, coniferous and mixed broad leaf forest landscape, with mixed larch forests at the lower elevations and shrubs at higher elevations. The vegetation is influenced by a maritime climate that is relatively warmer than the colder continental taiga in Siberia to the west. A long, thin island, 1,000 km by 200 km, Sakhalin is connected to the mainland by ice bridges in the winter, so it shares certain flora and fauna species. It is in the Palearctic realm, and mostly in the taiga biome with a Humid continental climate, cool summer climate. It covers 403,504 km^{2} (155,794 sq mi).

== Location and description ==
The Sakhalin Island taiga covers nearly all of Sakhalin Island, with the exception of the extreme southwestern tip, where warmer conditions support a predominantly broad leaf forest cover. The island is flat in the north, while the southern extent of the island, totaling 70% of the area, is mountainous. The mountains are split into two ridges: the East Sakhalin mountains and the West Sakhalin mountains.

Altitude zones play a large role in the types of forest cover. The island stretches north of Hokkaido, the northern major island of Japan, separated by 42 km. The mainland to the west is separated by the Sea of Okhotsk in the north, the Sea of Japan in the south, and the Tatar Strait at the narrowest point (8 km). To the east is the Pacific Ocean, and to the north the Sea of Okhotsk. The mountains are medium height, averaging 500–800 meters above sea level.

== Climate ==
The climate of the region is Subarctic climate, without dry season (Köppen climate classification Subarctic climate (Dfc)). This climate is characterized by mild summers (only 1–3 months above 10 °C (50.0 °F)) and cold, snowy winters (coldest month below −3 °C (26.6 °F)). The warm Tsushima Current flows up the southwest side of the island, while the cold Sea of Okhotsk current chills the northern part of the island.

The cold influence of the Okhotsk Sea, which is covered in ice much of the year, drives much of the taiga ecology of the island, even at the relatively southern latitudes. The island stretches from 46 degrees north to 54 degrees. The collisions of warm and cold sea current in a humid area produce frequent storms and fog.

Midpoint: 50.75 N, 142.75 E

Climate chart (precipitation, max. and min. temperature)
J	F	M	A	M	J	J	A	S	O	N	D
1.1 7 −10	0.9 11 −7	1.1 22 4	1.7 36 22	2.4 46 32	2 56 41	2.9 62 49	3.6 65 51	4 59 44	3.3 45 31	2.1 26 13	1.8 13 −2
- █ Average max. and min. temperatures in °F
- █ Precipitation totals in inches
- Source: GloalSpecies.org - Sakhalin Island taiga
Metric conversion
J	F	M	A	M	J	J	A	S	O	N	D
28 −14 −23	23 −12 −22	28 −6 −15	43 2 −6	61 8 0	51 13 5	74 17 9	91 19 11	102 15 7	84 7 −1	53 −3 −11	46 −11 −19
- █ Average max. and min. temperatures in °C
- █ Precipitation totals in mm

The island is wet, with monsoon characteristics. Precipitation is highest in the summer. Precipitation various from 600 to 1,200 mm/year, depending on location, altitude, etc. The Poronaysky Nature Reserve in the southeast of the island gets more than 100 rainstorms per year, average precipitation 600 mm/year, with frequent fog in the summer.

== Flora and fauna ==
Most generally, the forest cover of Sakhalin grades from light taiga (mostly Larix (Larch) species in the north, through dark taiga Picea (Spruce) species in the middle, to dark taiga Abies (Fir) species dominant in the south. On the coast are meadows and at the high altitudes aspects of tundra. In the north, Kurile larch is found in wet, swampy soil. In the middle and south, Yeddo spruce and Sakhalin fir dominate the mountain ridges. There are few endemic species because the island became separated from the mainland only recently.

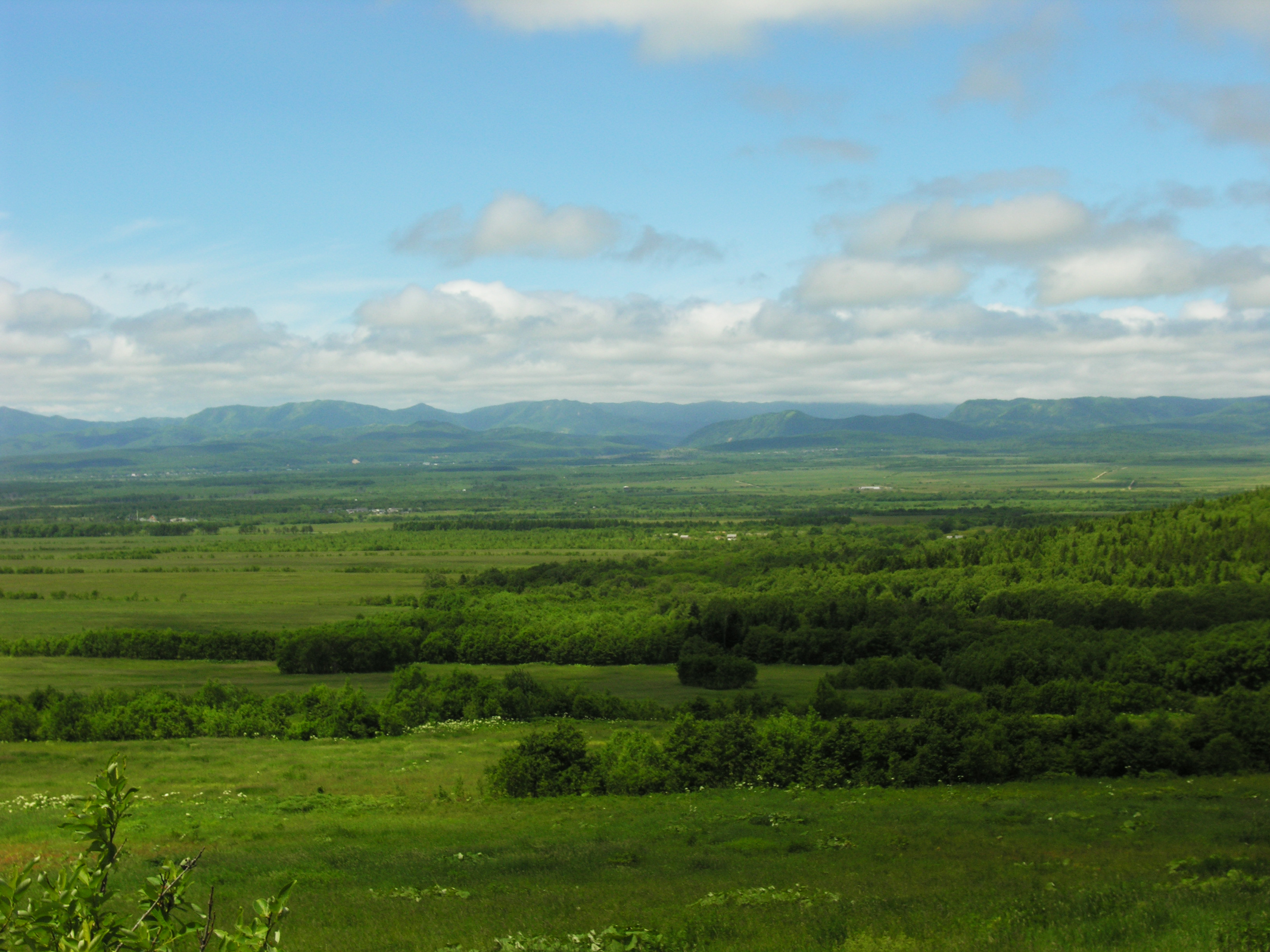
A view of Sakhalin Island, near Yuzhno-Sahalinsk

The rivers are important spawning grounds for migratory fish, including Cypriniformes (Carp), Gobiidae (Gobys), Cottidae (Sculpin), and Salmonidae (Salmon, Trout, etc. The freshwater rivers of Sakhalin Island are in the "Sakhalin, Hokkaido, & Sikhote - Alin Coast" freshwater ecoregion (ID #641). The rivers and streams of this ecoregion are characterized by three levels of flood: snowmelt from lowlands in spring, snowmelt from the mountains in early summer, and floods from monsoon rains in later summer.

== Threats ==
The area in the past has suffered from poor logging practices. Today, commercial logging is an important industry in the middle third of the ecoregion, threatening soil erosion and habitat degradation. Gas production fields are being developed in the northern areas.

== Protection ==
There is a federally protected area in the southeast of the island, and a number of regional nature reserves ("zakazniks").

- Poronaysky Nature Reserve. An IUCN class 1a nature reserve ("zapovednik"). Area: 567 km2.

== Urban areas and settlements ==
The only city in the ecoregion is Yuzhno-Sakhalinsk, at the southern end of the island. Otherwise, the region is sparsely populated.
