= Vasily Peskov =

Russian journalist (1930–2013)

- Василий Песков
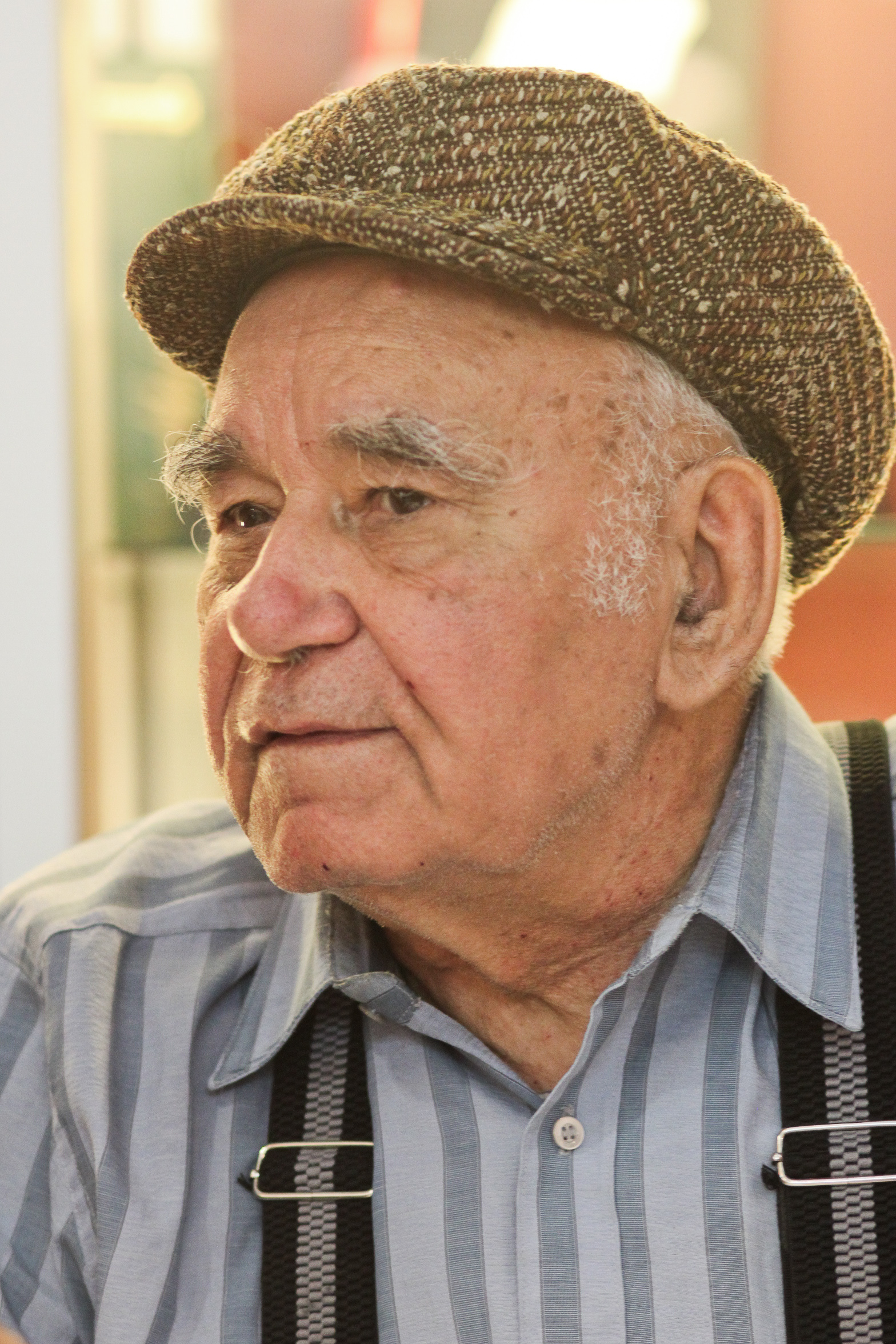
- Born: 14 March 1930; Orlovo, Central Black Earth Oblast, Soviet Union
- Died: 12 August 2013 (aged 83); Moscow, Russia
- Occupations: Writer, journalist
- Writing career
- Notable work: Lost in the Taiga

Vasily Mikhailovich Peskov (Russian: Васи́лий Миха́йлович Песко́в; 14 March 1930 – 12 August 2013) was a Soviet and Russian writer, journalist, photographer, traveler and ecologist. He worked in the Russian tabloid newspaper Komsomolskaya Pravda since 1956. From 1975 until 1990, he conducted the TV programme In the World of Animals on Soviet TV.

In 1964, he was awarded a Lenin Prize. In 1990, he was among the winners of UNEP's Global 500 Roll of Honour. In 2013, the Voronezh Nature Reserve, one of the oldest reserves in Russia, was officially renamed in his honor.

== Books ==
- Steps on Dew (1963)
- White Dreams (1965)
- End of the World (1967)
- The Roads of America (1973, with Boris Strelnikov)
- War and People (1979)
- Lost in the Taiga: One Russian Family's Fifty-Year Struggle for Survival and Religious Freedom in the Siberian Wilderness (1990) about the Lykov family
- Alaska is Greater than You Think (1995)
- Wanderings (1999)
- Proselki (2000)

== Awards ==
- Order "For Merit to the Fatherland"
- Order of the Badge of Honour
- Lenin Prize
- Order of the October Revolution
- Order of the Red Banner of Labour
