= Yerinat =

Location
- Country: Russia

Physical characteristics
- Mouth: Bolshoy Abakan
  - coordinates: 51°27′38″N 88°25′44″E
  - elevation: 1,037 m (3,402 ft)
- Length: 30 km (19 mi)

Basin features
- Progression: Bolshoy Abakan→ Abakan→ Yenisey→ Kara Sea

The Yerinat (Russian: Еринат) is a stream in Khakassia, Russia. It is a left tributary of the Bolshoy Abakan. It is 30 kilometres (19 mi) long. It is nearby to Khrebet Korbu and Gora Azhu-Tayga mountains.

== Localities in the area ==
- Khrebet Korbu Mountain, 22 km northwest
- Gora Azhu-Tayga Mountain, 26 km northeast
- Gora Tuzhu Mountain, 35 km west
- Gora Baskon Mountain, 42 km west
