= List of tundra ecoregions =

A list of tundra ecoregions from the World Wide Fund for Nature (WWF) includes:

Antarctic realm
Adelie Land tundra	Adélie Land
Central South Antarctic Peninsula tundra	Antarctic Peninsula
Dronning Maud Land tundra	Queen Maud Land
East Antarctic tundra	Eastern Antarctica
Ellsworth Land tundra	Ellsworth Land
Ellsworth Mountains tundra	Ellsworth Mountains
Enderby Land tundra	Enderby Land
Marie Byrd Land tundra	Marie Byrd Land
North Victoria Land tundra	Victoria Land
Northeast Antarctic Peninsula tundra	Antarctic Peninsula
Northwest Antarctic Peninsula tundra	Antarctic Peninsula
Prince Charles Mountains tundra	Prince Charles Mountains
Scotia Sea Islands tundra	South Georgia and the South Sandwich Islands, South Shetland Islands, Bouvet Island
South Antarctic Peninsula tundra	Antarctic Peninsula
South Orkney Islands tundra	South Orkney Islands
South Victoria Land tundra	Victoria Land
Southern Indian Ocean Islands tundra	Crozet Islands, Prince Edward Islands, Heard Island, Kerguelen Islands, McDonald Islands
Transantarctic Mountains tundra	Transantarctic Mountains
Australasian realm
Antipodes Subantarctic Islands tundra	Australia, New Zealand
Nearctic realm
Alaska–St. Elias Range tundra	Canada, United States
Aleutian Islands tundra	United States
Arctic coastal tundra	Canada, United States
Arctic foothills tundra	Canada, United States
Baffin coastal tundra	Canada
Beringia lowland tundra	United States
Beringia upland tundra	United States
Brooks–British Range tundra	Canada, United States
Davis Highlands tundra	Canada
High Arctic tundra	Canada
Interior Yukon–Alaska alpine tundra	Canada, United States
Kalaallit Nunaat high arctic tundra	Greenland
Kalaallit Nunaat low arctic tundra	Greenland
Low Arctic tundra	Canada
Middle Arctic tundra	Canada
Ogilvie–MacKenzie alpine tundra	Canada, United States
Pacific Coastal Mountain icefields and tundra	Canada; United States
Torngat Mountain tundra	Canada
Palearctic realm
Arctic desert	Russia
Bering tundra	Russia
Cherskii–Kolyma mountain tundra	Russia
Chukchi Peninsula tundra	Russia
Kamchatka mountain tundra and forest tundra	Russia
Kola Peninsula tundra	Norway; Russia
Northeast Siberian coastal tundra	Russia
Northwest Russian–Novaya Zemlya tundra	Russia
Novosibirsk Islands arctic desert	Russia
Scandinavian montane birch forest and grasslands	Finland, Norway, Sweden, Russia
Taimyr–Central Siberian tundra	Russia
Trans-Baikal Bald Mountain tundra	Russia
Wrangel Island Arctic desert	Russia
Yamalagydanskaja tundra	Russia
