= List of ecoregions in Russia =

The following is a list of ecoregions in Russia, according to the Worldwide Fund for Nature (WWF):

Russia's 49 outlined terrestrial ecoregions, each of a colored biome, stretch across the Palearctic realm of Eurasia. Russia contains 8 of 14 terrestrial biomes, or major habitat types, as defined by Olson & Dinerstein, et al. (2001).
01. Tropical and subtropical moist broadleaf forests
02. Tropical and subtropical dry broadleaf forests
03. Tropical and subtropical coniferous forests
04. Temperate broadleaf and mixed forests
05. Temperate coniferous forests
06. Taiga and Boreal forest
07. Tropical and subtropical grasslands, savannas, and shrublands
08. Temperate grasslands, savannas, and shrublands
09. Flooded grasslands and savannas
10. Montane grasslands and shrublands
11. Tundra
12. Mediterranean forests, woodlands, and scrub
13. Deserts and xeric shrublands
14. Mangroves
Rock and Ice, or Abiotic Land Zones

== Terrestrial ==
=== Temperate broadleaf and mixed forests ===
- Caucasus mixed forests (Armenia, Azerbaijan, Georgia, Russia, Turkey)
- Central European mixed forests (Austria, Belarus, Czech Republic, Germany, Lithuania, Moldova, Poland, Romania, Russia, Ukraine)
- Crimean Submediterranean forest complex (Russia, Ukraine)
- East European forest steppe (Bulgaria, Moldova, Romania, Russia, Ukraine)
- Manchurian mixed forests (China, Russia, North Korea, South Korea)
- Sarmatic mixed forests (Belarus, Estonia, Finland, Latvia, Lithuania, Norway, Russia, Sweden)
- South Sakhalin-Kurile mixed forests (Russia)
- Ussuri broadleaf and mixed forests (Russia)
- West Siberian broadleaf and mixed forests (Russia)

=== Temperate coniferous forests ===
- Altai montane forest and forest steppe (China, Kazakhstan, Mongolia, Russia)
- Da Hinggan-Dzhagdy Mountains conifer forests (China, Russia)
- Sayan montane conifer forests (Mongolia, Russia)

=== Boreal forests/taiga ===
- East Siberian taiga (Russia)
- Kamchatka-Kurile meadows and sparse forests (Russia)
- Kamchatka-Kurile taiga (Russia)
- Northeast Siberian taiga (Russia)
- Okhotsk-Manchurian taiga (Russia)
- Sakhalin Island taiga (Russia)
- Scandinavian and Russian taiga (Finland, Norway, Russia, Sweden)
- Trans-Baikal conifer forests (Mongolia, Russia)
- Urals montane tundra and taiga (Russia)
- West Siberian taiga (Russia)

=== Temperate grasslands, savannas and shrublands ===
- Daurian forest steppe (China, Mongolia, Russia)
- Kazakh forest steppe (Kazakhstan, Russia)
- Kazakh steppe (Kazakhstan, Russia)
- Mongolian-Manchurian grassland (China, Mongolia, Russia)
- Pontic steppe (Moldova, Romania, Russia, Ukraine)
- Sayan Intermontane steppe (Russia)
- Selenge-Orkhon forest steppe (Mongolia, Russia)
- South Siberian forest steppe (Russia)

=== Flooded grasslands and savannas ===
- Amur meadow steppe (China, Russia)
- Suiphun-Khanka meadows and forest meadows (Russia, China)

=== Montane grasslands and shrublands ===
- Altai alpine meadow and tundra (China, Kazakhstan, Mongolia, Russia)
- Sayan alpine meadows and tundra (Mongolia, Russia)

=== Tundra ===
- Arctic desert (Russia, Norway)
- Bering tundra (Russia)
- Cherskii-Kolyma mountain tundra (Russia)
- Chukchi Peninsula tundra (Russia)
- Kamchatka mountain tundra and forest tundra (Russia)
- Kola Peninsula tundra (Norway, Russia)
- Northeast Siberian coastal tundra (Russia)
- Northwest Russian-Novaya Zemlya tundra (Russia)
- Novosibirsk Islands arctic desert (Russia)
- Taimyr-Central Siberian tundra (Russia)
- Trans-Baikal Bald Mountain tundra (Russia)
- Wrangel Island arctic desert (Russia)
- Yamalagydanskaja tundra (Russia)

=== Deserts and xeric shrublands ===
- Caspian lowland desert (Iran, Kazakhstan, Russia, Turkmenistan)
- Great Lakes Basin desert steppe (Mongolia, Russia)

== Marine ==
(by realm and province)

=== Arctic realm ===
(no provinces identified)

- Beaufort Sea-continental coast and shelf
- Chukchi Sea
- Eastern Bering Sea
- East Siberian Sea
- Laptev Sea
- Kara Sea
- North and East Barents Sea
- White Sea

=== Temperate Northern Atlantic ===
==== Northern European Seas ====
- Northern Norway and Finnmark
- Baltic Sea

=== Temperate Northern Pacific ===
==== Cold Temperate Northwest Pacific ====
- Sea of Okhotsk
- Kamchatka Shelf and Coast
- Northern Honshu
- Sea of Japan

==== Cold Temperate Northeast Pacific ====
- Aleutian Islands
