= Northeast Siberian taiga =

Ecoregion in northeastern Siberia, Russia

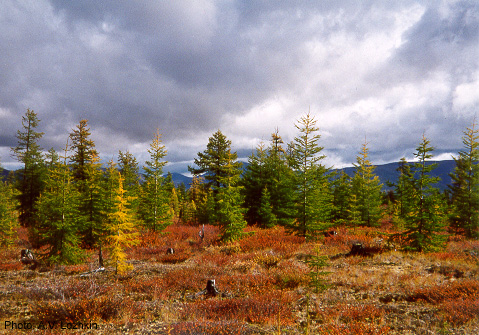
- Dahurian larch trees, Kolyma region, arctic northeast Siberia

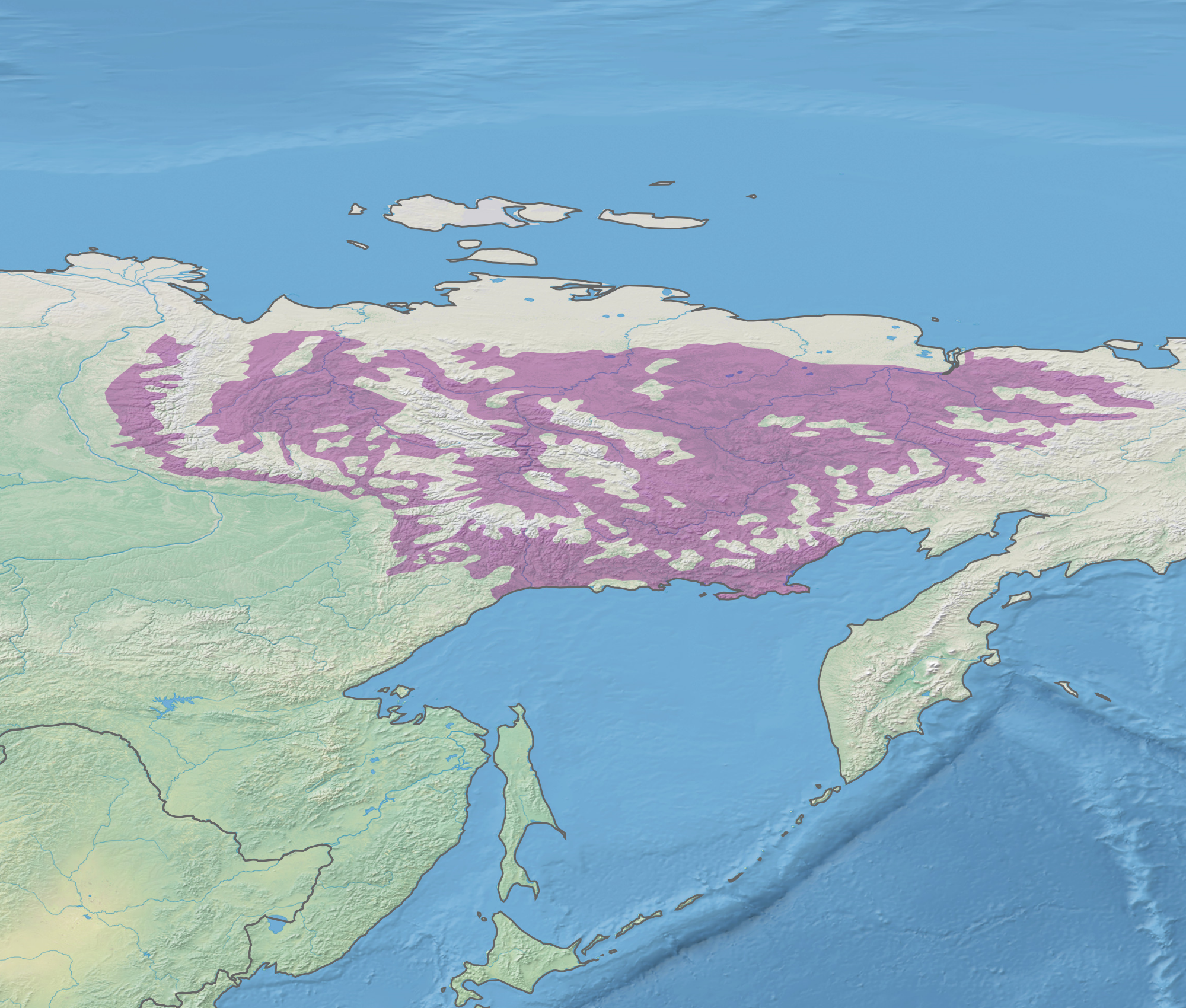
- Ecoregion territory (in purple)

Ecology
- Realm: Palearctic
- Biome: Boreal forests/taiga

Geography
- Area: 1,529.373 km^{2} (590.494 mi^{2})
- Country: Russia
- Rivers: Lena River, Kolyma River
- Climate type: Dfd

The Northeast Siberian taiga ecoregion (WWF ID: PA0605) is an area of "sparse taiga forest" between the Lena River and the Kolyma River in northeastern Siberia, Russia. The ecoregion's internal borders form a patchwork of territory constituting the southern part of the East Siberian Lowland, as well as lowlands around the East Siberian Mountains, including the ridges and peaks of the Verkhoyansk Range and the Chersky Range. On the southern border of the ecoregion is the north coast of the Sea of Okhotsk, giving the region maritime boreal forests as well as the continental forests situated inland. The ecoregion is one of the largest tracts of virgin boreal forest in the world, due to the very sparse population and difficult access. It is mostly in the Sakha Republic (Yakutsk region).

== Location and description ==
The ecoregion covers an area about 1,800 km west–east by 1,000 km north–south. The western border is the Lena River; beyond that is the East Siberian taiga ecoregion. The eastern edge is the Kolyma River, beyond which farther east is the Bering tundra ecoregion. To the north is a strip Arctic coastal tundra about 100 km wide, the Northeast Siberian coastal tundra ecoregion. The Okhotsk Sea to the south completes the outline of the ecoregion, but internally the Verhkoyansk and Chersky mountains (which are in the "Cherskii-Kolyma mountain tundra" ecoregion) confines the ecoregion into valleys and lowlands. The region is in the Palearctic realm (Euro-Siberian region). It covers 1,670,283 km^{2} (644,900 sq mi).

The Verkhoyansk Range is an "L-shaped" range that runs down the east side of the Lena before turning west–east across the south of the ecoregion. The Chersky Range runs northwest-to-southeast through the middle of the region. Their upper slopes and peaks are too cold and dry to support the forests and flora of the lowlands in the Northeast Siberian taiga ecoregion. To the east and north of the mountains lies the Kolyma River basin. In addition to the Kolyma River, the ecoregion contains the Indigirka River and the Yana River.

== Climate ==
The region has an extreme subarctic climate (Köppen climate classification Dfd), with long, extremely cold winters and short warm summers. Regions with a Dfd climate have 1-3 months with temperatures averaging above 10 °C (50 °F) and at least one month with mean temperatures below −38 °C (−36 °F) , this region has some of the coldest winters in the Northern Hemisphere with the lowest temperature recorded being −68 °C (−90 °F).

Verkhoyansk, Sakha Republic, Russia

Climate chart (precipitation, max. and min. temperature)
| J | F | M | A | M | J | J | A | S | O | N | D |
| 6 −43 −49 | 6 −37 −46 | 5 −20 −39 | 6 −3 −22 | 12 10 −3 | 23 20 6 | 33 23 9 | 32 18 4 | 14 9 −3 | 13 −9 −19 | 10 −32 −40 | 8 −40 −47 |
- █ Average max. and min. temperatures in °C
- █ Precipitation totals in mm
- Source: Pogoda.ru.net
Imperial conversion
| J | F | M | A | M | J | J | A | S | O | N | D |
| 0.2 −45 −56 | 0.2 −34 −51 | 0.2 −4 −37 | 0.2 26 −8 | 0.5 50 27 | 0.9 68 43 | 1.3 74 48 | 1.3 65 40 | 0.6 47 27 | 0.5 16 −3 | 0.4 −26 −40 | 0.3 −40 −52 |
- █ Average max. and min. temperatures in °F
- █ Precipitation totals in inches

Precipitation is relatively low, ranging from 150–200 mm/year in central Yakutia, to 400–500 mm/year in the mountains.

== Flora ==
The dominant trees are Larix cajanderi (Dahurian larch), Larix sibirica, Larix × czekanowskii, Betula dahurica, Betula pendula (silver birch), Pinus sibirica, Pinus sylvestris, Pinus koraiensis, Picea obovata, Abies sibirica, Juniperus communis, Quercus mongolica, Prunus serrulata, Prunus padus, Tilia amurensis, Salix babylonica, Populus tremula, Ulmus davidiana, and Ulmus pumila, with a ground cover of Pinus pumila (Siberian dwarf pine) Haloxylon ammodendron (saxaul), Elaeagnus angustifolia, Tamarix ramosissima, Prunus sibirica, and lichen. Further development of the forest is limited by the continuous permafrost of the area, and by the harsh cold winters and relatively low precipitation. The region is a large sink for atmospheric carbon dioxide.

In the lowland floodplains there are steppe floral communities that feature fescue (Festuca), wheatgrass, alpine oatgrass (Helictotrichon), cinquefoils (Potentilla tollii), Orostachys spinosa, Carex pediformis, and others. The ecoregion is one of the floral regions of the Circumboreal Region.

== Fauna ==
Migrant waterfowl are common in the northern areas near the tundra; species include Melanitta nigra (Common scoter), Anser fabalis (Bean goose), and Anas formosa (Baikal teal). Off the rocky coast of the Sea of Okhotsk are important breading areas for seabirds. Over one million individuals from 15 species are seen in the area, and is one of the only breeding grounds for the Little curlew and the critically endangered Siberian crane.

The Siberian taiga also is home to galliforms, like the willow ptarmigan (Lagopus lagopus) and rock ptarmigan (Lagopus muta) in areas of open tundra. Populations of black-billed capercaillies (Tetrao urogalloides) and hazel grouse (Tetrastes bonasia) tend to inhabit forested habitat.

Common mammals are elk (Alces alces), Siberian chipmunk (Eutamias sibiricus), lynx (Felis lynx), Siberian weasel (Mustela sibirica), red fox (Vulpes vulpes) and brown bear (Ursus arctos).

== Protections ==
Notable protected areas of the Russian Federation in the West Siberian taiga include:

- Magadan Nature Reserve An IUCN class Ia "strict ecological reserve" (a Zapovednik). (Area: 782 km2)

== Threats ==
The region is relatively untouched by human activities; the region is one of the largest virgin forests in the world. There is some mining activity, and logging. As usual with boreal forests, wild fires are a threat in the summer.

== Urban areas and settlements ==
The area is sparsely populated; the only city is Magadan on the Okhotsk Sea, and scattered mining and logging villages.

== See also ==
- List of ecoregions in Russia
