= Kamchatka Taiga =

Ecoregion in the middle of the Kamchatka Peninsula

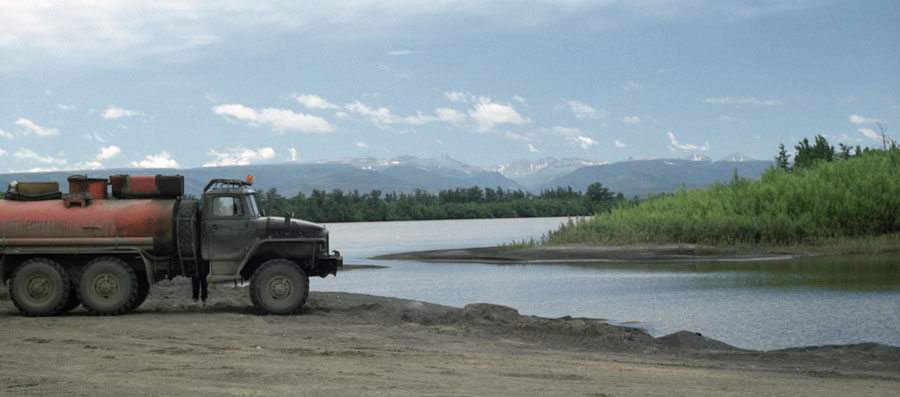
- Kamchatka River, which runs through the middle of the ecoregion

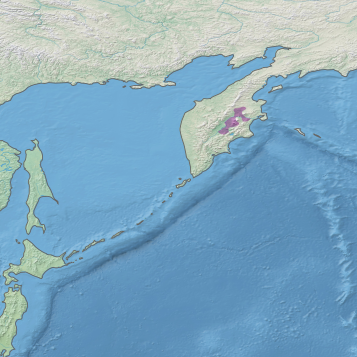
- Ecoregion territory (in purple)

Ecology
- Realm: Palearctic
- Biome: Boreal forests/taiga

Geography
- Area: 147,064 km^{2} (56,782 sq mi)
- Country: Russia
- State: Kamchatka Krai
- Elevation: 800–1500 meters
- Coordinates: 56°15′N 160°15′E
- Rivers: Kamchatka River
- Climate type: Dfc
- Soil types: Andesols, Gleysols

The Kamchatka Taiga ecoregion (WWF ID: PA0604) is a "conifer island" in the middle of the Kamchatka Peninsula, along the Kamchatka River. It is the easternmost example of Siberian taiga. The region has unusual ecological conditions, a "snow forest" that combines low temperatures, high humidity and boreal forest with heavy snowfall. The local ecology is also affected by volcanic activity. The region is about 300 km long (north–south), and averages about 100 km west–east. It is in the Palearctic realm, and mostly in the Boreal forests/taiga ecoregion with a humid continental climate, cool summer climate. It covers 147,064 km^{2} (56,782 sq mi).

== Location and description ==
The ecoregion is situated in the central valley of the Kamchatka Peninsula, between the Sredinny Mountains to the west (these form the main ridge down the middle of the peninsula), and the Eastern Mountains to the east. The parallel mountain ranges average about 3,500 feet in height, and drop abruptly to the valley floor of the Kamchatka River that flows between them. The river plain is wet and alluvial, the soils are andosols (black volcanic) and gleysols (soils of saturated groundwater). The ecoregion is surrounded by the Kamchatka mountain tundra and forest tundra and Kamchatka-Kurile meadows and sparse forests ecoregions. The ecoregion is at relatively high latitudes (55 to 57 degrees N).

== Climate ==
The climate of the ecoregion is Humid continental climate, cool summer ((Dfc)). The climate is slightly more continental than the coastal and mountain areas, and is capable of supporting very marginal agriculture, mostly pastoral. The area is overcast much of the time — Kamchatka has one of the highest levels of cloud cover in the world, with precipitation averaging over 15 days per month. The peninsula is affected by the cool current in the Sea of Okhotsk to the west, and the East Kamchatka Current that flows SW down the east coast in the Pacific Ocean.

Climate, 56.25 N, 160.25 W

Climate chart (precipitation, max. and min. temperature)
J	F	M	A	M	J	J	A	S	O	N	D
2.1 5 −11	1.6 8 −8	1.5 15 −2	1.6 26 12	1.7 39 25	1.9 51 34	2.7 59 42	3.1 57 41	2.4 49 34	2.7 36 22	2.6 19 5	2.2 8 −6
- █ Average max. and min. temperatures in °F
- █ Precipitation totals in inches
- Source: GlobalSpecies.org
Metric conversion
J	F	M	A	M	J	J	A	S	O	N	D
53 −15 −24	41 −14 −22	38 −9 −19	41 −4 −11	43 4 −4	48 11 1	69 15 5	79 14 5	61 10 1	69 2 −5	66 −7 −15	56 −13 −21
- █ Average max. and min. temperatures in °C
- █ Precipitation totals in mm

The growing period is 90 to 119 days. There is no permafrost in the ecoregion, due to the warmer summers and snow cover in the winter.

== Flora ==
At the lowest elevations are forests of Daurian larch (L. cajanderi), Yezo spruce (Picea jezoensis) and Japanese white birch (Betula platyphylla). Stone birch (Betula ermanii) is also found in the area.

== Fauna ==
The region is well known for large populations of Kamchatka brown bear, the largest bear in Eurasia. Other distinctive species include the snow ram, the northern deer, the Black-capped marmot (Marmota kamtschatica), and a subspecies of sable (Martes zibellina) specific to Kamchatka. The rivers of the region are important spawning grounds for migratory fish — all species of salmon are found on the island.

== Protections ==
There are no federal-level protected areas in the ecoregion.

== Threats ==
The central valley forests have been under logging pressure for centuries. It is estimated that only 2.1% of the forest is in its original state, but increased conservation activity is bringing more of the area under protection.

== Urban areas and settlements ==
There are no cities in region, and only a handful of settlements. There is a road that runs along the Kamchatka River, and a small airport at the town of Kozyrevsk; otherwise the area is very sparsely populated.
