= Kamchatka mountain tundra and forest tundra =

Ecoregion in Russia

Kamchatka Mountain tundra and forest tundra
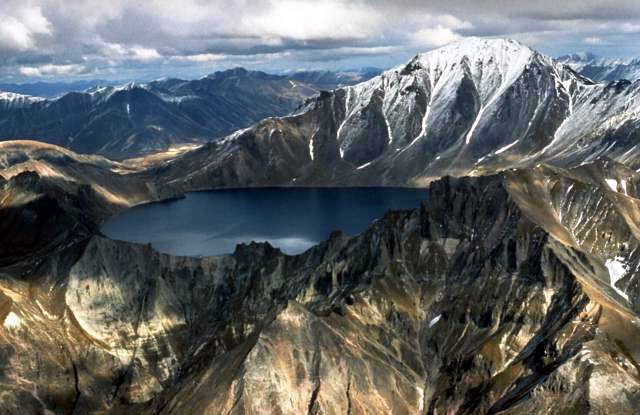
- Khangar Volcano, Kamchatka

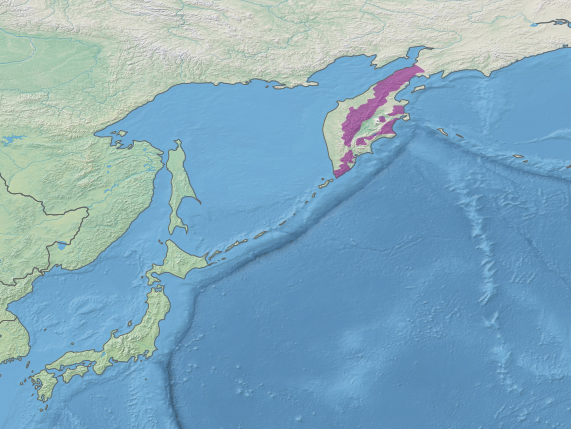
- Ecoregion territory (in purple)

Ecology
- Realm: Palearctic
- Biome: Tundra

Geography
- Area: 119,400 km^{2} (46,100 mi^{2})
- Countries: Russia
- Coordinates: 51.75°N 96.25°E

The Kamchatka Mountain tundra and forest tundra ecoregion (WWF ID: PA1105) is an ecoregion of mountain tundra and forest tundra that covers the central mountain range of the Kamchatka Peninsula in the Russian Far East. The region is one of volcanos, caldera, geysers, and mountain tundra. It is in the Palearctic realm and tundra biome. It has an area of 119,400 square kilometres (46,100 mi^{2}).

== Location and description ==
The ecoregion covers the higher elevations of the Sredinny Range - the central mountain ridge of Kamchatka stretching about 700 km from northeast to southwest and the Eastern Range along the southeast coast. The ecoregion is surrounded by the Kamchatka-Kurile meadows and sparse forests ecoregion, which covers the low river valleys and coastal lands.

== Climate ==
The region has a Humid continental climate - cool summer subtype (Koppen classification Dfc). This climate is characterized by high variation in temperature, both daily and seasonally; With long, cold winters and short, cool summers with no averaging over 22 °C (72 °F). Mean precipitation is about 604 mm/year. The mean temperature at the center of the ecoregion is −24.9 °C (−12.8 °F) in January, and 20.3 °C (68.5 °F) in July.

== Flora and fauna ==
The ecoregion is the southernmost large expanse of Arctic tundra floral community in the world (51-60 degrees N). The area is notable for "azonal" floral communities - habitats that form around hot springs, volcanic activity, and mountain lakes. Most floral communities are, however, grouped by altitude zones. Erman's birch (Betula ermanii) forms a zonal vegetation belt at 600–800 m in the mountains; above which are alpine grasses and tundra floral groups.

== Protections ==
There are several significant nationally protected areas that reach into this ecoregion, including:

- Kronotsky Nature Reserve, on the southeast side of the peninsula, protecting an area of volcanoes and geysers.

== See also ==
- List of ecoregions in Russia
