= Chukchi Peninsula tundra =

Ecoregion in Russia

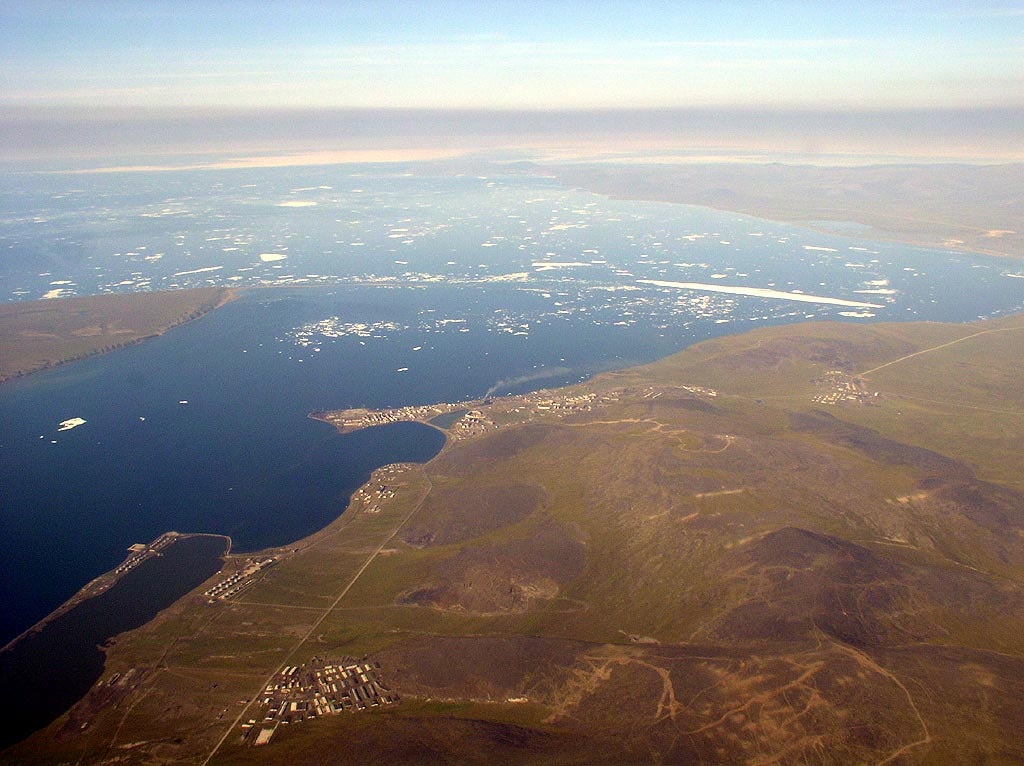
- Town of Pevek, on Chaunskaya Bay

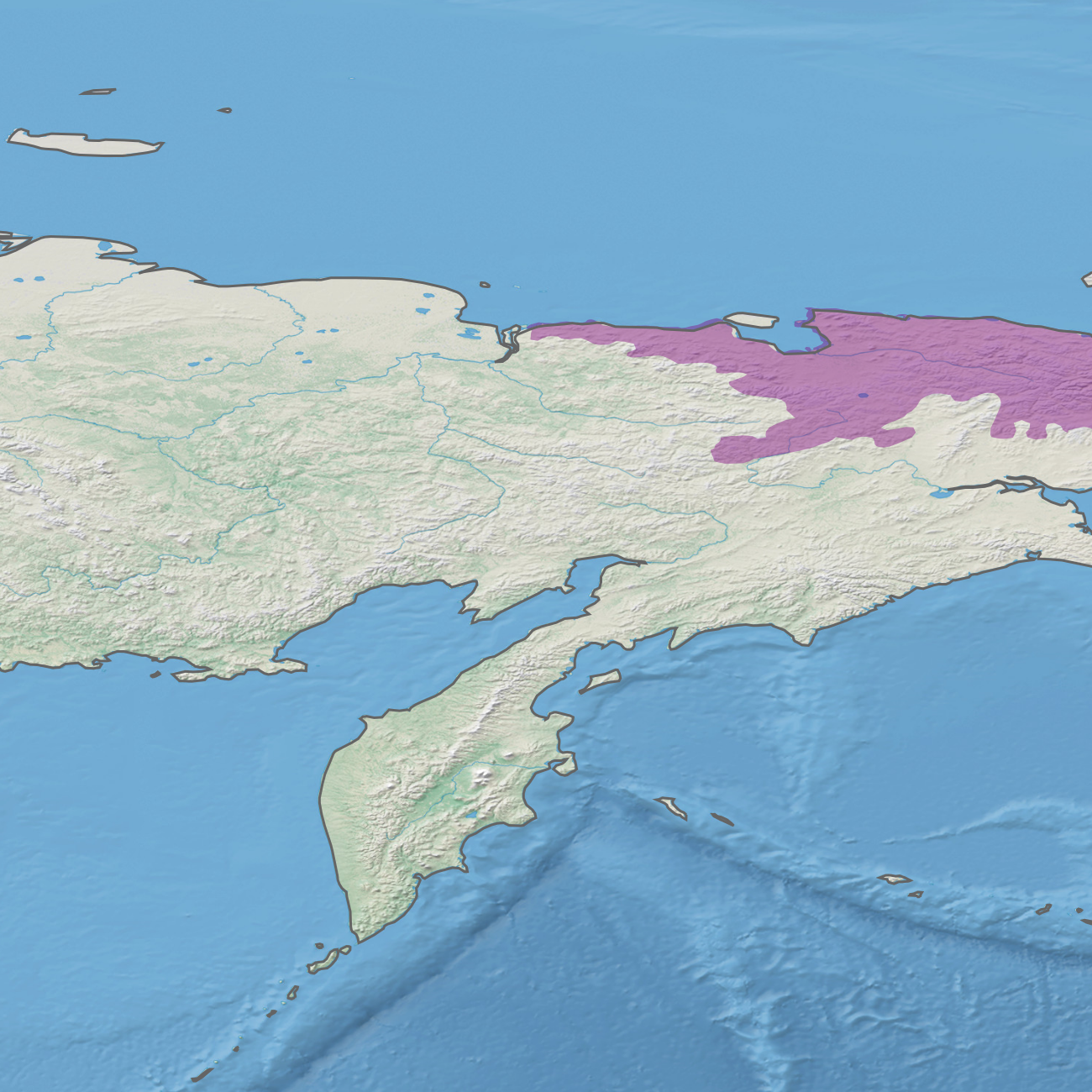
- Ecoregion territory (in purple)

Ecology
- Realm: Palearctic
- Biome: Tundra

Geography
- Area: 298,367 km^{2} (115,200 sq mi)
- Country: Russia
- Coordinates: 67.75°N 170.25°E

The Chukchi Peninsula tundra ecoregion (WWF ID: PA1104) is an ecoregion that covers the northern coast of Russia along the East Siberian Sea, a marginal sea of the Arctic Ocean. The climate is somewhat milder than would be expected for its latitude, but the moderating effects of the East Siberian Sea and Bering Sea permits summer daytime temperatures above 50 °F (10 °C). Many colonies of migrating birds visit the area. The ecoregion is in the Palearctic realm, and tundra biome. It has an area of 298,367 square kilometres (115,200 sq mi).

== Location and description ==
The ecoregion stretches 700 km from the mouth of the Lena River in the northwest to the eastern tip of the Chukchi Peninsula in the east. The terrain is mostly treeless Arctic plains on alluvial deposits and widespread groundwater saturation. There are some small mountains reaching up to 1,000 meters.

== Climate ==
The region has a Tundra (Koppen classification ET). This climate is characterized by long, cold winters and very short summers with at least one month averaging over 0 °C (32 °F) so that snow or ice might melt, but no month averages over 10 °C (50 °F). Mean precipitation in Pevek, on the north coast, averages 184 mm/year, with mean temperatures of −26.9 °C (−16.4 °F) in January, and 8.7 °C (47.7 °F) in July.

== Flora and fauna ==
The ecoregion lies north of the treeline, with only scattered communities of brush among the widespread tundra floral cover. Over 400 species of lichen and moss have been recorded.

== Protections ==
Beringia National Park is a significant nationally protected area in this ecoregion.

== See also ==
- List of ecoregions in Russia
- East Siberian Mountains
