= South Sakhalin–Kurile mixed forests =

Ecoregion in Russia

South Sakhalin-Kurile mixed forests
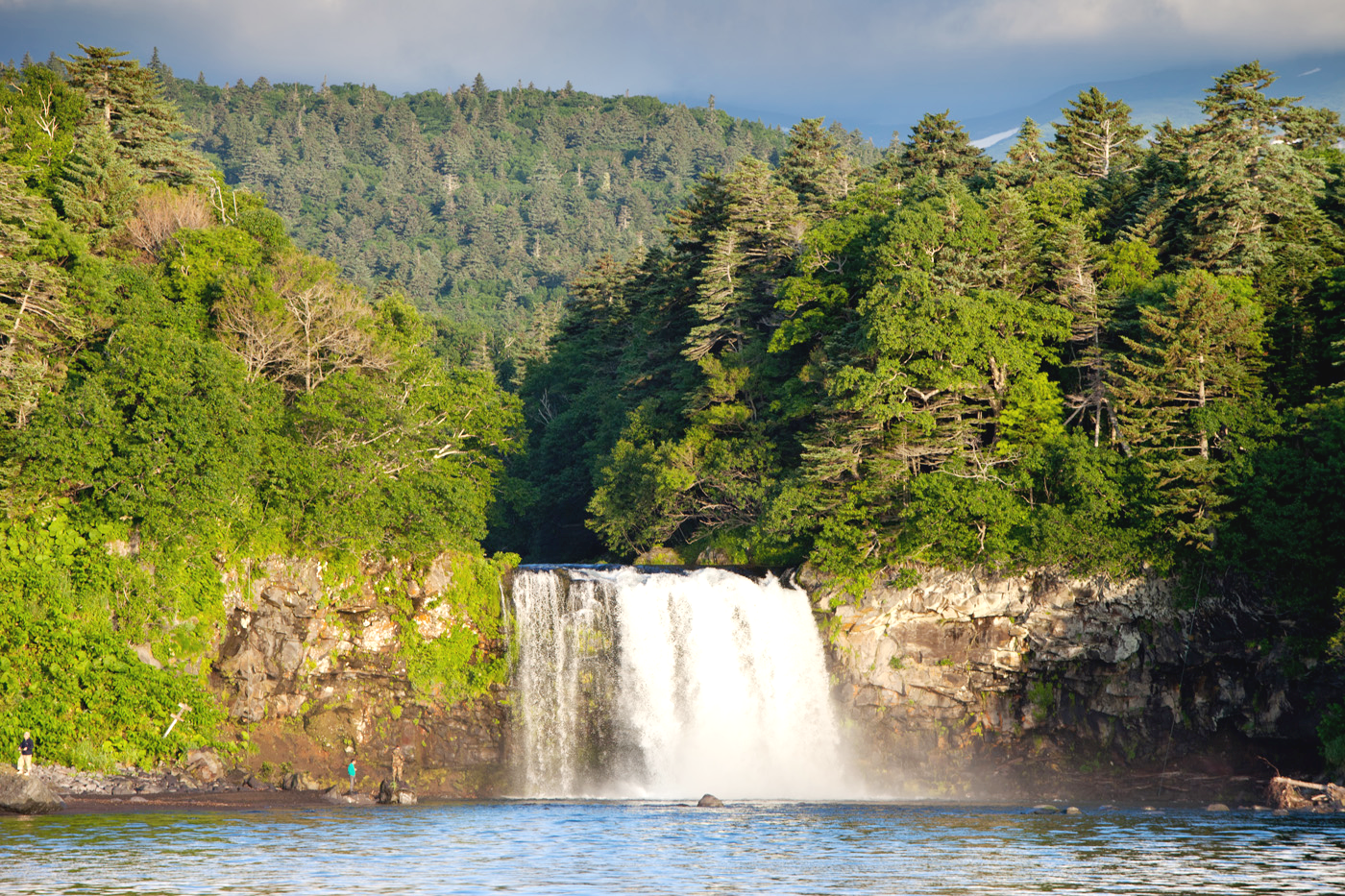
- Ptichi waterfall, Kunahir Island in the Kuriles

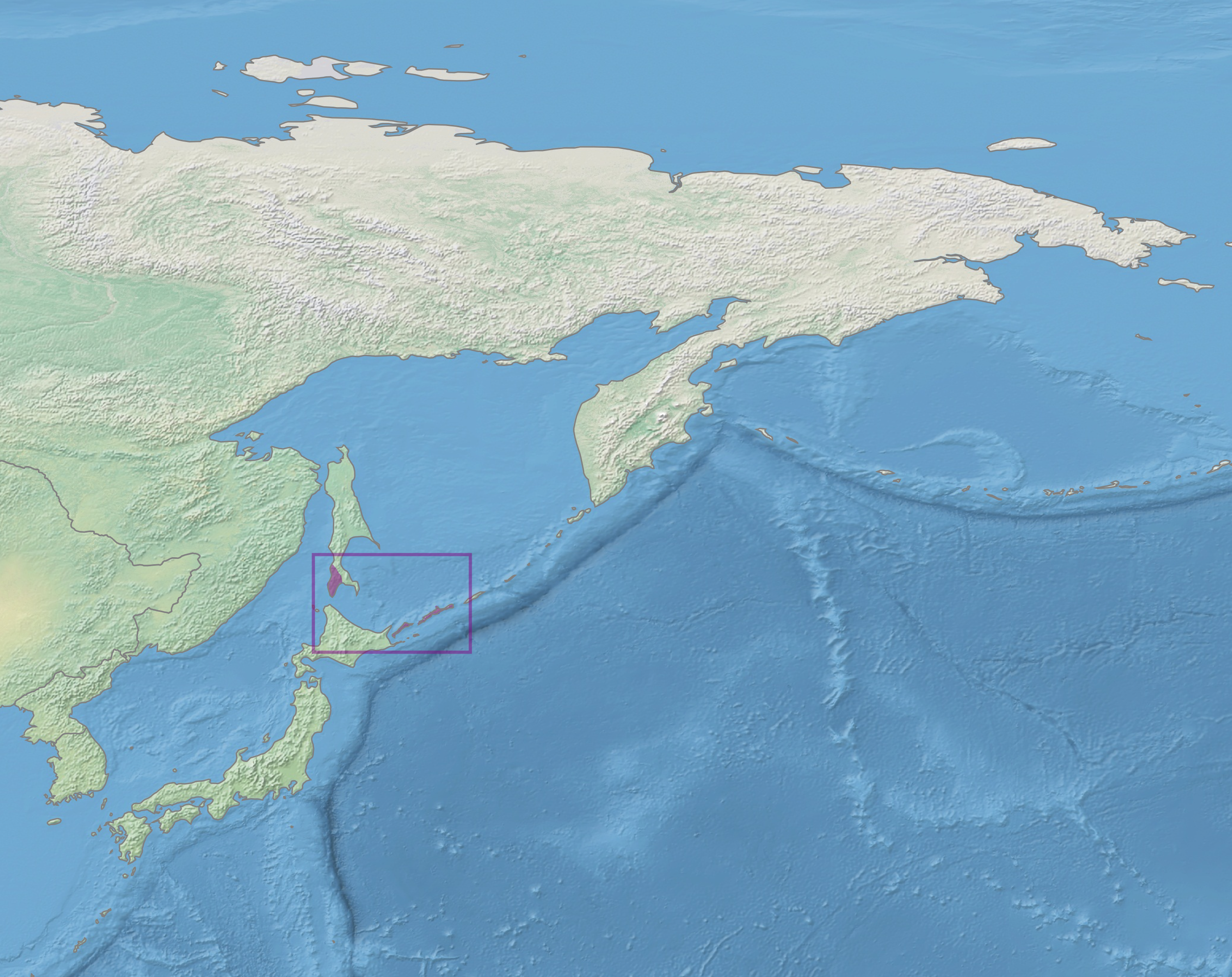
- Ecoregion territory (in purple)

Ecology
- Realm: Palearctic
- Biome: temperate broadleaf and mixed forests

Geography
- Area: 12,432 km^{2} (4,800 mi^{2})
- Country: Russia

The South Sakhalin-Kurile mixed forests ecoregion (WWF ID: PA0438) is split between the southwest region of Sakhalin Island, and the southern three islands of the Kurile Islands chain in the Russian Far East. The ecoregion is in the Palearctic realm, with a Humid Continental climate. It covers 12,432 km^{2} (4,800 sq mi).

== Location and description ==
The Sakhalin Island side of the ecoregion faces the Sea of Japan to the west, and the Okhotsk Sea to the east. Being on the southern end of the island, plant life is denser and more varied. The Kurile Islands side of the ecoregion has high levels of biodiversity, reflecting the islands' position along the meeting of warm and cold sea currents (the Pacific Ocean and Okhotsk Sea, respectively). The resulting richness of marine life attracts large colonies of marine birds. The ecoregion in the Kurils is defined as the southern three islands: Kunashir Island, Iturup, and Shikotan. These islands were connected to the Japanese island of Hokkaido during the most recent glacial period, and unlike the northern two thirds of the Kuriles are not icebound in winter.

== Climate ==
The region has a Humid continental climate - Warm summer sub-type (Köppen climate classification Dfb), with a pronounced seasonal lag and a warm summer with long and cold winters somewhat moderated by the ocean currents.

== Flora and fauna ==
The area is characterized by high biodiversity because of the moderating effect of the ocean, transition-zone placement, and island location. The flora of the southern Kuriles is closely related to that of Hokkaido, and endemism is low. A dominant floral community in the southern Kuriles is the bamboo thicket. Snow falling on the evergreen bamboo thickets in winter insulates the understory, which is relatively empty but abounding in shrews, mice and other rodents. These animals also thrive in the high-growth thickets, typified by white clover and "Sakhalin buckwheat" (Reynoutria sachalinensis).

Although plant communities are favorable to rodents, a noteworthy feature of the animal life in the southern Kuriles is the predominance of predator species, such as fox, sable, and bear, which have had to develop broader sources of food, particular marine sources on the coasts. Salmon are abundant in the streams.

== Protections ==
Notable protected areas of the Russian Federation in the ecoregion include:

- Kurils Nature Reserve, which covers the north and south regions of Kunashir Island in the Kurils. (Area: 654 km^{2})

This is an IUCN class Ia "strict ecological reserves" (Zapovednik).

== See also ==
- List of ecoregions in Russia
