= Cherskii–Kolyma mountain tundra =

Ecoregion in Russia

Ecoregion: Cherskii-Kolyma mountain tundra
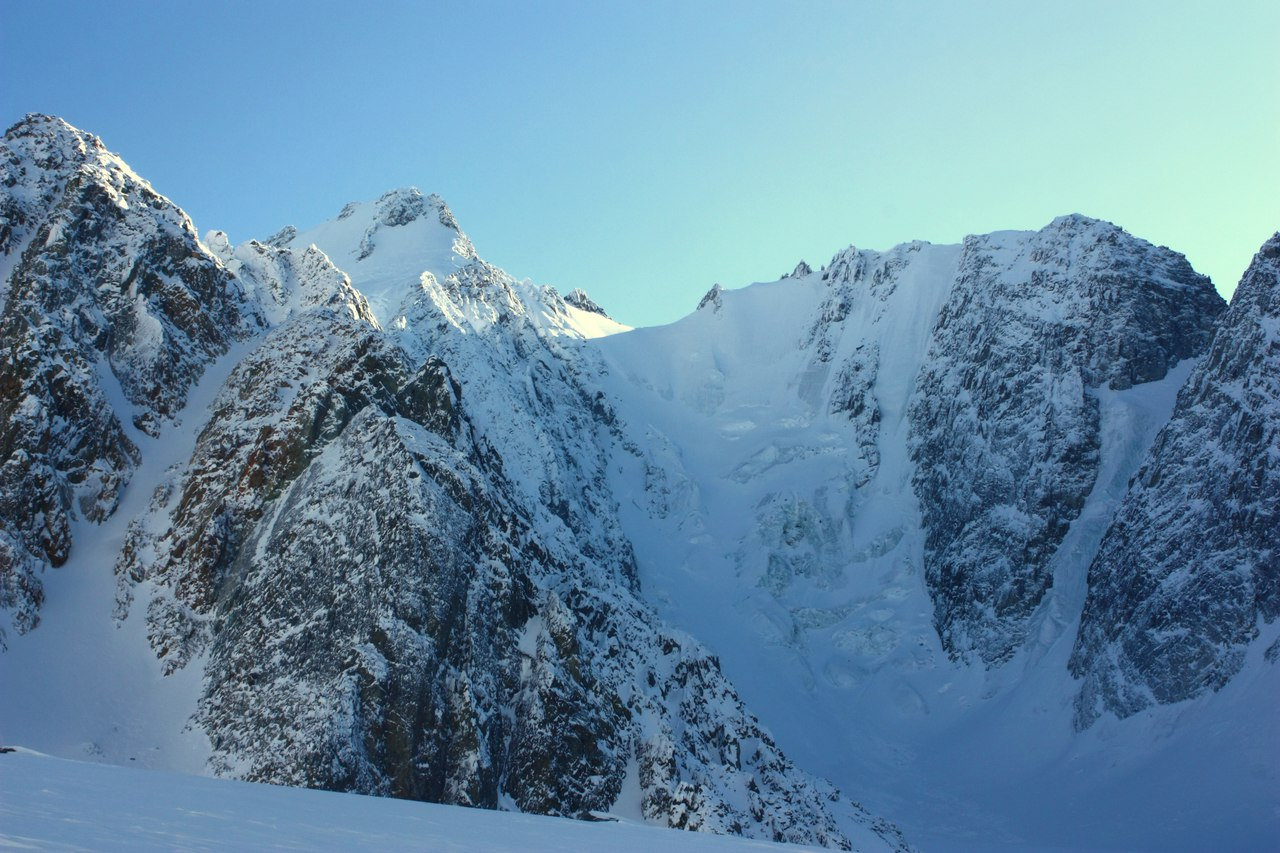
- Mount Pobeda, Ulakhan-Chistay, Chersky Range

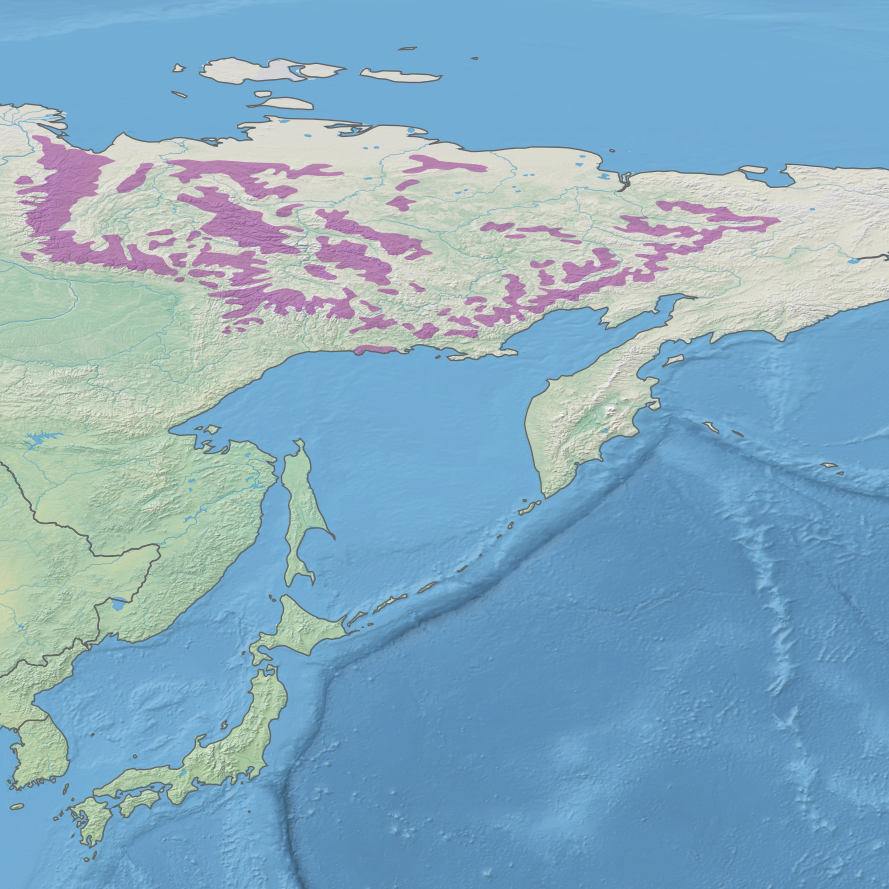
- Ecoregion territory (in purple)

Ecology
- Realm: Palearctic
- Biome: Tundra

Geography
- Area: 556,589 km^{2} (214,900 mi^{2})
- Countries: Russia
- Coordinates: 65.75°N 143.75°E

The Cherskii–Kolyma mountain tundra ecoregion (WWF ID: PA1103) is an ecoregion that covers the higher elevations of the Chersky Range and the Kolyma Mountains, the only large mountain range in northern Russia. It is in the Palearctic realm, and tundra biome. It has an area of 556,589 square kilometres (214,900 mi^{2}).

== Location and description ==
The ecoregion encompasses terrain above 800 meters in the Chersky Range and Kolyma Mountains, in a mosaic of territory stretching 2,000 km from the Lena River in the west to the eastern edge of the Kolyma Mountains, and approximately 1,000 km from the Okhotsk Sea in the south to the coastal plain of the Arctic Sea in the north. The highest peaks reach 3,000 meters at Peak Pobeda.

== Climate ==
Most of the region has a Subarctic climate - very cold (Koppen classification Dfd). This climate is characterized by long, cold winters and short, cool summers with no month averaging over 22 °C (72 °F), and only one to three months in which the mean temperature rises above 10 °C (50 °F). Mean precipitation is about 237 mm/year. The mean temperature at the center of the ecoregion is −46.8 °C (−52.2 °F) in January, and 10.6 °C (51.1 °F) in July.

== Flora and fauna ==
Only hardy species can survive year around at altitude in this ecoregion. A few stands of larch may reach up to 1,000 meters, above that to about 1,900 meters might be found sub-alpine dwarf pine, followed by a thin zone of alpine tundra to 2,200 meters, and no plants above 2,200 meters.

== Protections ==
There is one significant nationally protected area that reaches into this ecoregion, the Magadan Nature Reserve, on the southern edge of the ecoregion along the sea of Okhotsk.

== See also ==
- List of ecoregions in Russia
