= Palearctic realm =

One of Earth's eight biogeographic realms

- The Palearctic realm (in red).

Ecology
- Realm: Palearctic
- Animals: Eurasian

Geography
- Area: 54,000,000 km^{2} (21,000,000 mi^{2})

The Palearctic (or Palaearctic) is the world's largest biogeographic realm. Confined largely to the Eastern Hemisphere, it stretches across Europe and Asia, north of the foothills of the Himalayas, and North Africa.

The realm consists of several bioregions, including Europe, the Mediterranean Basin, North Africa, North Arabia, Western, Central, North and East Asia. The Palaearctic realm also has numerous rivers and lakes, forming several freshwater ecoregions.

Both the eastern and westernmost extremes of the Palearctic span into the Western Hemisphere, including western Europe (Iceland south to Portugal), Macaronesia, and northwestern Africa (Morocco) in the west, and Cape Dezhnyov in Chukotka Autonomous Okrug to the east. The term was first used in the 19th century, and is still in use as the basis for zoogeographic classification.

== History ==
In an 1858 paper for the Proceedings of the Linnean Society, British zoologist Philip Sclater first identified six terrestrial zoogeographic realms of the world: Palaearctic, Aethiopian/Afrotropic, Indian/Indomalayan, Australasian, Nearctic, and Neotropical. The six indicated general groupings of fauna, based on shared biogeography and large-scale geographic barriers to migration.

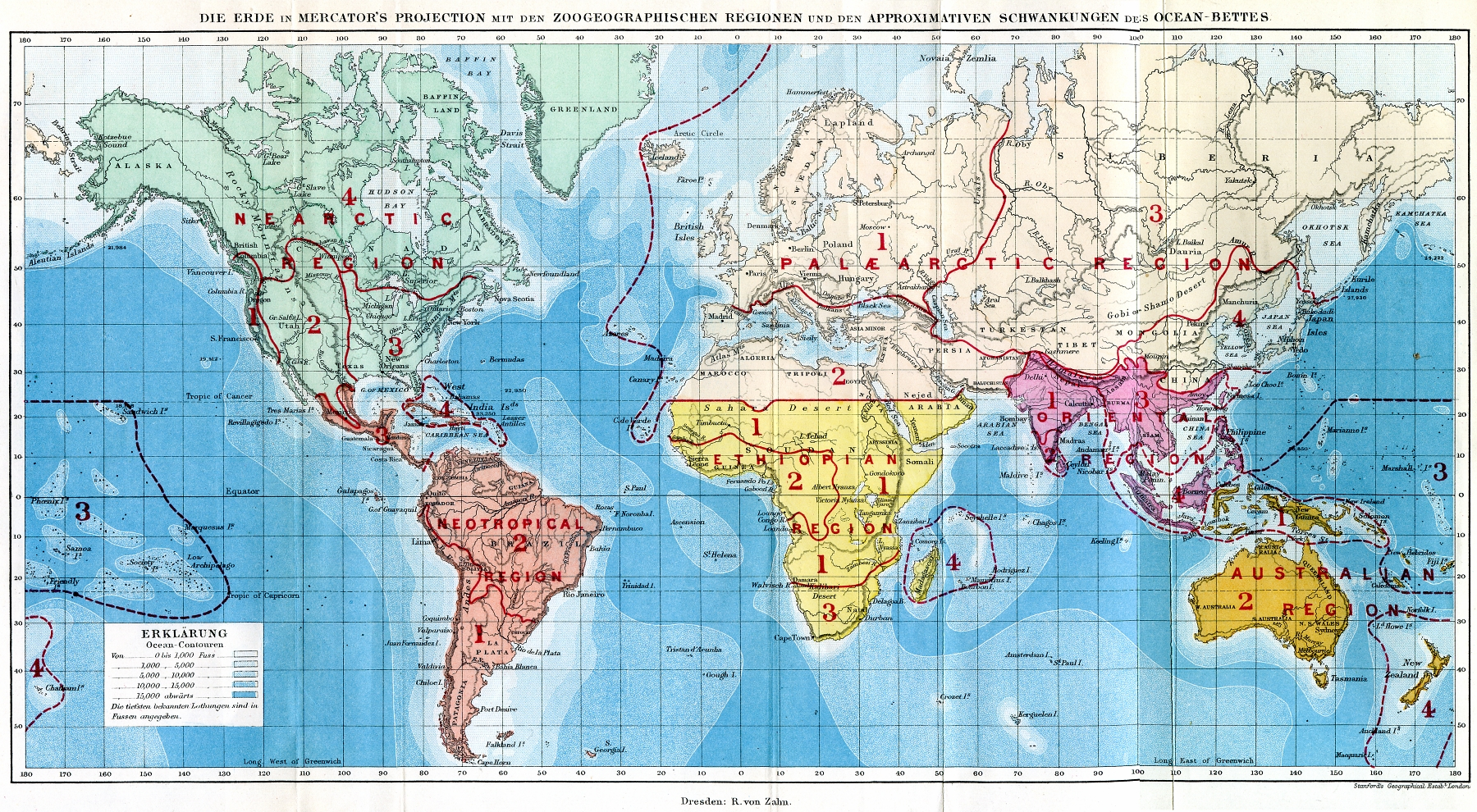
Frontispiece to Alfred Russel Wallace's book The Geographical Distribution of Animals

Alfred Wallace adopted Sclater's scheme for his book The Geographical Distribution of Animals, published in 1876. This is the same scheme that persists today, with relatively minor revisions, and the addition of two more realms: Oceania and the Antarctic.

== Major ecological regions ==
The Palearctic realm includes mostly boreal/subarctic-climate and temperate-climate ecoregions, which stretch from western Europe to the Bering Sea.

=== Euro-Siberian region ===
The boreal and temperate Euro-Siberian region is the Palearctic's largest biogeographic region, which transitions from tundra in the northern reaches of Russia and Scandinavia to the vast taiga, the boreal coniferous forests which run across the continent. South of the taiga is a belt of temperate broadleaf and mixed forests and temperate coniferous forests. This vast Euro-Siberian region is characterised by many shared plant and animal species, and has many affinities with the temperate and boreal regions of the Nearctic realm of North America. Eurasia and North America were often connected by the Bering land bridge, and have very similar mammal and bird fauna, with many Eurasian species having moved into North America, and fewer North American species having moved into Eurasia. Many zoologists consider the Palearctic and Nearctic to be a single Holarctic realm. The Palearctic and Nearctic also share many plant species, which botanists call the Arcto-Tertiary Geoflora.

=== Mediterranean Basin ===
The lands bordering the Mediterranean Sea in southern Europe, north Africa, and western Asia are home to the Mediterranean Basin ecoregions, which together constitute the world's largest and most diverse Mediterranean climate region of the world, with generally mild, rainy winters and hot, dry summers. The Mediterranean basin's mosaic of Mediterranean forests, woodlands, and scrub are home to 13,000 endemic species. The Mediterranean basin is also one of the world's most endangered biogeographic regions; only 4% of the region's original vegetation remains, and human activities, including overgrazing, deforestation, and conversion of lands for pasture, agriculture, and urbanisation, have degraded much of the region. Formerly the region was mostly covered with forests and woodlands, but heavy human use has reduced much of the region to the sclerophyll shrublands known as matorral, maquis, or garrigue. Conservation International has designated the Mediterranean basin as one of the world's biodiversity hotspots.

=== Sahara and Arabian deserts ===
A great belt of deserts, including the Atlantic coastal desert, Sahara Desert, and Arabian Desert, separates the Palearctic and Afrotropic ecoregions. This scheme includes these desert ecoregions in the palearctic realm; other biogeographers identify the realm boundary as the transition zone between the desert ecoregions and the Mediterranean basin ecoregions to the north, which places the deserts in the Afrotropic, while others place the boundary through the middle of the desert.

=== Western and Central Asia ===
The Caucasus mountains, which run between the Black Sea and the Caspian Sea, are a particularly rich mix of coniferous, broadleaf, and mixed forests, and include the temperate rain forests of the Euxine-Colchic deciduous forests ecoregion.

Central Asia and the Iranian plateau are home to dry steppe grasslands and desert basins, with montane forests, woodlands, and grasslands in the region's high mountains and plateaux. In southern Asia the boundary of the Palearctic is largely altitudinal. The middle altitude foothills of the Himalaya between about 2,000–2,500 m (6,600–8,200 ft) form the boundary between the Palearctic and Indomalayan ecoregions.

=== East Asia ===
China, Korea and Japan are more humid and temperate than adjacent Siberia and Central Asia, and are home to rich temperate coniferous, broadleaf, and mixed forests, which are now mostly limited to mountainous areas, as the densely populated lowlands and river basins have been converted to intensive agricultural and urban use. East Asia's temperate forests are rich in biodiversity, with 185 tree genera compared to 53 in Europe and 99 in Eastern North America. East Asia lost fewer tree genera during the ice ages than other temperate forest regions, and retained 96 percent of the tree genera in the Pliocene fossil record while Europe retained only 27 percent. In the subtropical region of southern China and southern edge of the Himalayas, the Palearctic temperate forests transition to the subtropical and tropical forests of Indomalaya, creating a rich and diverse mix of plant and animal species. The mountains of southwest China are also designated as a biodiversity hotspot. In southeastern Asia, high mountain ranges form tongues of Palearctic flora and fauna in northern Indochina and southern China. Isolated small outposts (sky islands) occur as far south as central Myanmar (on Nat Ma Taung, 3,050 m; 10,010 ft), northernmost Vietnam (on Fan Si Pan, 3,140 m; 10,300 ft) and the high mountains of Taiwan.

=== Freshwater ===
The realm contains several important freshwater ecoregions as well, including the heavily developed rivers of Europe, the rivers of Russia, which flow into the Arctic, Baltic, Black, and Caspian seas, Siberia's Lake Baikal, the oldest and deepest lake on the planet, and Japan's ancient Lake Biwa.

== Flora and fauna ==
One bird family, the accentors (Prunellidae), is endemic to the Palearctic region. The Holarctic has four other endemic bird families: the divers or loons (Gaviidae), grouse (Tetraoninae), auks (Alcidae), and waxwings (Bombycillidae).

There are no endemic mammal orders in the region, but several families are endemic; Calomyscidae (mouse-like hamsters), Prolagidae, and Ailuridae (red pandas). Several mammal species originated in the Palearctic and spread to the Nearctic during the Ice Age, including the brown bear (Ursus arctos, known in North America as the grizzly), red deer (Cervus elaphus) in Europe and the closely related elk (Cervus canadensis) in far eastern Siberia, American bison (Bison bison), and reindeer (Rangifer tarandus, known in North America as the caribou).

=== Megafaunal extinctions ===
Several large Palearctic animals became extinct from the end of the Pleistocene into historic times, including Irish elk (Megaloceros giganteus), aurochs (Bos primigenius), woolly rhinoceros (Coelodonta antiquitatis), woolly mammoth (Mammuthus primigenius), North African elephant (Loxodonta africana pharaoensis), Chinese elephant (Elephas maximus rubridens), cave bear (Ursus spelaeus), Straight tusked elephant (Palaeoloxodon antiquus) and European lion (Panthera leo europaea).

== Palearctic terrestrial ecoregions ==
The outlined ecoregions of the western Palearctic realm, each of a coloured biome. Note that this realm, as a whole, has 10 of 14 biomes, or major habitat types, as defined by Olson & Dinerstein, et al. (2001).: 01. Tropical and subtropical moist broadleaf forests; 02. Tropical and subtropical dry broadleaf forests; 03. Tropical and subtropical coniferous forests; 04. Temperate broadleaf and mixed forests; 05. Temperate coniferous forests; 06. Taiga and Boreal forest; 07. Tropical and subtropical grasslands, savannas, and shrublands; 08. Temperate grasslands, savannas, and shrublands; 09. Flooded grasslands and savannas; 10. Montane grasslands and shrublands; 11. Tundra; 12. Mediterranean forests, woodlands, and scrub; 13. Deserts and xeric shrublands; 14. Mangroves; Rock and Ice, or Abiotic Land Zones

The outlined ecoregions of the eastern Palearctic realm, each of a coloured biome

Palearctic tropical and subtropical moist broadleaf forests ecoregions
Guizhou Plateau broadleaf and mixed forests	China
Yunnan Plateau subtropical evergreen forests	China

Palearctic temperate broadleaf and mixed forests
Apennine deciduous montane forests	Italy
Atlantic mixed forests	Belgium, Denmark, France, Germany, Ireland, Netherlands, United Kingdom
Azores temperate mixed forests	Portugal
Balkan mixed forests	Bosnia and Herzegovina, Bulgaria, Greece, Kosovo, North Macedonia, Romania, Serbia, Turkey
Baltic mixed forests	Denmark, Germany, Poland, Sweden
Cantabrian mixed forests	France, Portugal, Spain
Caspian Hyrcanian mixed forests	Azerbaijan, Iran
Caucasus mixed forests	Armenia, Azerbaijan, Georgia, Iran, Russia, Turkey
Celtic broadleaf forests	Ireland, United Kingdom
Central Anatolian deciduous forests	Turkey
Central China loess plateau mixed forests	China
Central European mixed forests	Austria, Belarus, Czech Republic, Germany, Lithuania, Moldova, Poland, Romania, Russia, Ukraine
Central Korean deciduous forests	North Korea, South Korea
Changbai Mountains mixed forests	China, North Korea
Changjiang Plain evergreen forests	China
Crimean Submediterranean forest complex	Russia, Ukraine
Daba Mountains evergreen forests	China
Dinaric Mountains mixed forests	Albania, Bosnia and Herzegovina, Croatia, Italy, Kosovo, Montenegro, Serbia, Slovenia
East European forest steppe	Bulgaria, Moldova, Romania, Russia, Ukraine
Eastern Anatolian deciduous forests	Turkey
English Lowlands beech forests	United Kingdom
Euxine–Colchic deciduous forests	Bulgaria, Georgia, Turkey
Hokkaido deciduous forests	Japan
Huang He Plain mixed forests	China
Madeira evergreen forests	Portugal
Manchurian mixed forests	China, North Korea, Russia, South Korea
Nihonkai evergreen forests	Japan
Nihonkai montane deciduous forests	Japan
North Atlantic moist mixed forests	Ireland, United Kingdom (Northern Ireland, Scotland, Wales), Denmark (Faroe Islands)
Northeast China Plain deciduous forests	China
Pannonian mixed forests	Austria, Bosnia and Herzegovina, Croatia, Czech Republic, Hungary, Romania, Serbia, Slovakia, Slovenia, Ukraine
Po Basin mixed forests	Italy, Switzerland
Pyrenees conifer and mixed forests	Andorra, France, Spain
Qin Ling Mountains deciduous forests	China
Rodope montane mixed forests	Bulgaria, Greece, North Macedonia, Serbia
Sarmatic mixed forests	Belarus, Denmark, Estonia, Finland, Latvia, Lithuania, Norway, Russia, Sweden
Sichuan Basin evergreen broadleaf forests	China
South Sakhalin–Kurile mixed forests	Russia
Southern Korea evergreen forests	South Korea
Taiheiyo evergreen forests	Japan
Taiheiyo montane deciduous forests	Japan
Tarim Basin deciduous forests and steppe	China
Ussuri broadleaf and mixed forests	Russia
West Siberian broadleaf and mixed forests	Russia
Western European broadleaf forests	Austria, Belgium, Czech Republic, France, Germany, Ireland, Luxembourg, Netherlands, Poland, Switzerland, United Kingdom
Zagros Mountains forest steppe	Iran, Iraq, Turkey

Palearctic temperate coniferous forests ecoregions
Alps conifer and mixed forests	Austria, France, Germany, Italy, Slovenia, Switzerland
Altai montane forest and forest steppe	China, Kazakhstan, Mongolia, Russia
Caledon conifer forests	United Kingdom
Carpathian montane conifer forests	Czech Republic, Poland, Romania, Slovakia, Ukraine
Da Hinggan–Dzhagdy Mountains conifer forests	China, Russia
East Afghan montane conifer forests	Afghanistan, Pakistan
Elburz Range forest steppe	Iran
Helanshan montane conifer forests	China
Hengduan Mountains subalpine conifer forests	China
Hokkaido montane conifer forests	Japan
Honshū alpine conifer forests	Japan
Khangai Mountains conifer forests	Mongolia
Mediterranean conifer and mixed forests	Algeria, Morocco, Spain, Tunisia
Northeastern Himalayan subalpine conifer forests	China, India, Bhutan
Northern Anatolian conifer and deciduous forests	Turkey
Nujiang Langcang Gorge alpine conifer and mixed forests	China
Qilian Mountains conifer forests	China
Qionglai–Minshan conifer forests	China
Sayan montane conifer forests	Mongolia, Russia
Scandinavian coastal conifer forests	Norway
Tian Shan montane conifer forests	China, Kazakhstan, Kyrgyzstan

Palearctic boreal forests/taiga ecoregions
East Siberian taiga	Russia
Iceland boreal birch forests and alpine tundra	Iceland
Kamchatka–Kurile meadows and sparse forests	Russia
Kamchatka–Kurile taiga	Russia
Northeast Siberian taiga	Russia
Okhotsk–Manchurian taiga	Russia
Sakhalin Island taiga	Russia
Scandinavian and Russian taiga	Finland, Norway, Russia, Sweden
Trans-Baikal conifer forests	Mongolia, Russia
Urals montane tundra and taiga	Russia
West Siberian taiga	Russia

Ecoregion	Location(s)
Alai–Western Tian Shan steppe	Kazakhstan, Tajikistan, Uzbekistan
Altai steppe and semi-desert	Kazakhstan
Central Anatolian steppe	Turkey
Daurian forest steppe	China, Mongolia, Russia
Eastern Anatolian montane steppe	Armenia, Azerbaijan, Georgia, Iran, Turkey
Emin Valley steppe	China, Kazakhstan
Faroe Islands boreal grasslands	Faroe Islands, Denmark
Gissaro–Alai open woodlands	Kyrgyzstan, Tajikistan, Uzbekistan
Kazakh forest steppe	Kazakhstan, Russia
Kazakh steppe	Kazakhstan, Russia
Kazakh Uplands	Kazakhstan
Mongolian–Manchurian grassland	China, Mongolia, Russia
Pontic steppe	Kazakhstan, Moldova, Romania, Russia, Ukraine, Bulgaria
Sayan Intermontane steppe	Russia
Selenge–Orkhon forest steppe	Mongolia, Russia
South Siberian forest steppe	Russia
Syrian xeric grasslands and shrublands	Iraq, Jordan, Syria
Tian Shan foothill arid steppe	China, Kazakhstan, Kyrgyzstan

Palearctic tundra ecoregions
Arctic desert	Russia, Svalbard (Norway)
Bering tundra	Russia
Cherskii–Kolyma mountain tundra	Russia
Chukchi Peninsula tundra	Russia
Kamchatka mountain tundra and forest tundra	Russia
Kola Peninsula tundra	Norway, Russia
Northeast Siberian coastal tundra	Russia
Northwest Russian–Novaya Zemlya tundra	Russia
New Siberian Islands arctic desert	Russia
Scandinavian montane birch forest and grasslands	Finland, Norway, Sweden
Taimyr–Central Siberian tundra	Russia
Trans-Baikal Bald Mountain tundra	Russia
Wrangel Island arctic desert	Russia
Yamalagydanskaja tundra	Russia

Palearctic Mediterranean forests, woodlands, and scrub ecoregions
Aegean and Western Turkey sclerophyllous and mixed forests	Greece, North Macedonia, Turkey
Anatolian conifer and deciduous mixed forests	Turkey
Canary Islands dry woodlands and forests	Spain
Corsican montane broadleaf and mixed forests	France
Crete Mediterranean forests	Greece
Cyprus Mediterranean forests	Cyprus
Eastern Mediterranean conifer–sclerophyllous–broadleaf forests	Israel, Jordan, Lebanon, Syria, Turkey
Iberian conifer forests	Spain
Iberian sclerophyllous and semi-deciduous forests	Portugal, Spain
Illyrian deciduous forests	Albania, Bosnia and Herzegovina, Croatia, Greece, Italy, Slovenia
Italian sclerophyllous and semi-deciduous forests	France, Italy
Mediterranean acacia-argania dry woodlands and succulent thickets	Morocco, Canary Islands (Spain)
Mediterranean dry woodlands and steppe	Algeria, Egypt, Libya, Morocco, Tunisia
Mediterranean woodlands and forests	Algeria, Libya, Morocco, Tunisia
Northeastern Spain and Southern France Mediterranean forests	France, Monaco, Spain
Northwest Iberian montane forests	Portugal, Spain
Pindus Mountains mixed forests	Albania, Greece, North Macedonia
South Apennine mixed montane forests	Italy
Southeastern Iberian shrubs and woodlands	Spain
Southern Anatolian montane conifer and deciduous forests	Israel, Jordan, Lebanon, Syria, Turkey
Southwest Iberian Mediterranean sclerophyllous and mixed forests	Portugal, Spain
Tyrrhenian–Adriatic sclerophyllous and mixed forests	Croatia, France, Italy, Malta

Palearctic deserts and xeric shrublands
Afghan Mountains semi-desert	Afghanistan
Alashan Plateau semi-desert	China, Mongolia
Arabian Desert	Egypt, Israel, Iraq, Jordan, Kuwait, Palestine, Saudi Arabia, Yemen
Atlantic coastal desert	Mauritania, Western Sahara
Azerbaijan shrub desert and steppe	Azerbaijan, Georgia, Iran
Badghyz and Karabil semi-desert	Afghanistan, Iran, Tajikistan, Turkmenistan, Uzbekistan
Baluchistan xeric woodlands	Afghanistan, Pakistan
Caspian lowland desert	Iran, Kazakhstan, Russia, Turkmenistan
Central Afghan Mountains xeric woodlands	Afghanistan
Central Asian northern desert	Kazakhstan, Uzbekistan
Central Asian riparian woodlands	Kazakhstan, Turkmenistan, Uzbekistan
Central Asian southern desert	Kazakhstan, Turkmenistan, Uzbekistan
Central Persian desert basins	Afghanistan, Iran
Eastern Gobi desert steppe	China, Mongolia
Gobi Lakes Valley desert steppe	Mongolia
Great Lakes Basin desert steppe	Mongolia, Russia
Junggar Basin semi-desert	China, Mongolia
Kazakh semi-desert	Kazakhstan
Kopet Dag semi-desert	Iran, Turkmenistan
Mesopotamian shrub desert	Iraq, Iran, Israel, Jordan, Syria
North Saharan steppe and woodlands	Algeria, Egypt, Libya, Mauritania, Morocco, Tunisia, Western Sahara
Paropamisus xeric woodlands	Afghanistan
Persian Gulf desert and semi-desert	Bahrain, Kuwait, Oman, Qatar, Saudi Arabia, United Arab Emirates
Qaidam Basin semi-desert	China
Red Sea coastal desert	Egypt, Sudan
Red Sea Nubo–Sindian tropical desert and semi-desert	Egypt, Jordan, Oman, Saudi Arabia, Yemen
Registan–North Pakistan sandy desert	Afghanistan, Iran, Pakistan
Sahara desert	Algeria, Chad, Egypt, Libya, Mali, Niger, Sudan, Western Sahara
South Iran Nubo–Sindian desert and semi-desert	Iran, Iraq, Pakistan
South Saharan steppe and woodlands	Algeria, Chad, Mali, Mauritania, Niger, Sudan
Taklimakan desert	China
Tibesti–Jebel Uweinat montane xeric woodlands	Chad, Egypt, Libya, Sudan
West Saharan montane xeric woodlands	Algeria, Mali, Mauritania, Niger

== Sources ==
- Amorosi, T. "Contributions to the zooarchaeology of Iceland: some preliminary notes" in The Anthropology of Iceland (eds. E.P. Durrenberger & G. Pálsson). Iowa City: University of Iowa Press, pp. 203–227, 1989.
- Buckland, P.C., et al. "Holt in Eyjafjasveit, Iceland: a paleoecological study of the impact of Landnám" in Acta Archaeologica 61: pp. 252–271. 1991.
- Edmund Burke III, "The Transformation of the middle Eastern Environment, 1500 B.C.E.–2000 C.E." in The Environment and World History, ed. Edmund Burke III and Kenneth Pomeranz. Berkeley: University of California Press. 2009, 82–84.
