= Kamchatka–Kurile meadows and sparse forests =

Ecoregion that covers parts of the Russian Far East

Kamchatka-Kurile meadows and sparse forests
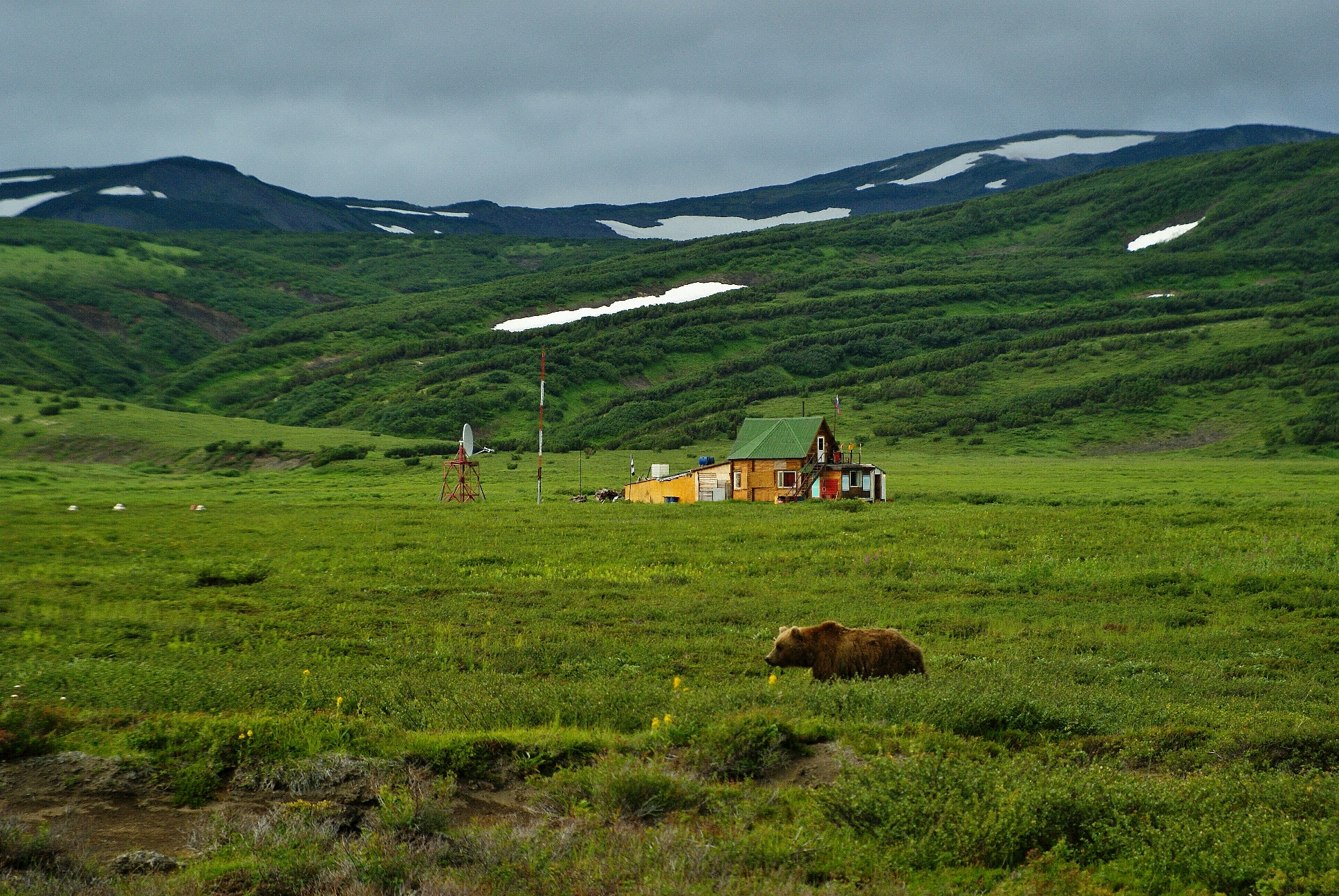
- Landscape, Kronotsky Nature Reserve

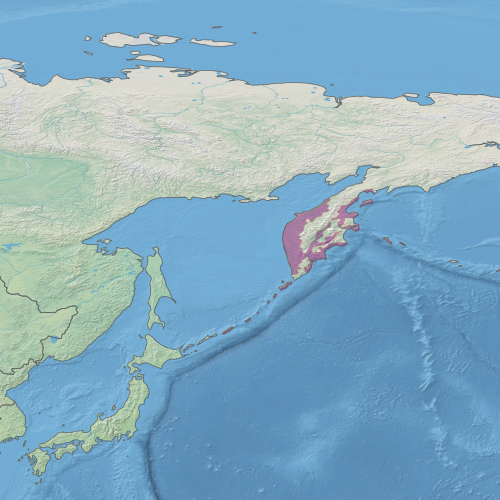
- Ecoregion territory (in purple)

Ecology
- Realm: Palearctic
- Biome: Boreal forests/taiga

Geography
- Area: 146,334 km^{2} (56,500 sq mi)
- Coordinates: 55.25°N 158.75°E
- Climate type: Dfc

The Kamchatka-Kurile meadows and sparse forests ecoregion (WWF ID: PA0603) covers the coastal zones of the Kamchatka peninsula, northern section of the Kuril Islands, and the Commander Islands in the Russian Far East. The region noted for its sparse forests of Betula ermanii ("Stone birch"), and also for extensive tall-herb meadows. It is in the Palearctic realm, and mostly in the boreal forests/taiga biome with a Humid continental climate, cool summer climate. It covers 146,334 km^{2} (56,500 sq mi).

== Location and description ==
The coasts of Kamchatka are relatively flat, and cooled by the cold current of the Sea of Okhotsk to the west, and the East Kamchatka Current that flows down the east coast on the Bering Sea side. The ecoregion includes the Kuril Islands down to Urup Island, the northernmost 800 km of islands that stretch down from the peninsula. The Commander Islands lie in the 175 km to the east of the middle of the peninsula in the Bering Sea. The area is volcanic, and the soils are Andosol (black volcanic).

== Climate ==
The climate of this region is mostly Subarctic climate, without dry season (Köppen climate classification Subarctic climate (Dfc and Dsc)). This climate is characterized by mild or cool summers (only 1–3 months above 10 °C (50.0 °F)) and cold, snowy winters (coldest month below −3 °C (26.6 °F)) with oceanic influences.

Climate at 55.25 N, 158.25 E

Climate chart (precipitation, max. and min. temperature)
J	F	M	A	M	J	J	A	S	O	N	D
2.1 11 −2	1.6 13 −1	1.5 20 5	1.8 29 17	1.8 40 29	2 50 37	2.9 58 44	3.4 58 45	2.9 52 39	3.8 40 28	3 24 13	2.3 15 3
- █ Average max. and min. temperatures in °F
- █ Precipitation totals in inches
- Source: GlobalSpecies.org
Metric conversion
J	F	M	A	M	J	J	A	S	O	N	D
53 −12 −19	41 −11 −18	38 −7 −15	46 −2 −8	46 4 −2	51 10 3	74 14 7	86 14 7	74 11 4	97 4 −2	76 −4 −11	58 −9 −16
- █ Average max. and min. temperatures in °C
- █ Precipitation totals in mm

There is no permafrost south of 57 degrees north, reflecting the relatively warmer conditions. Precipitation can reach 2,500 mm per year, compared with lows of 450 mm in the central valley where the mountains provide some protection.

== Flora ==
The main floral communities are dwarf forest (primarily Alder and Siberian Dwarf Pine), sparse forests (Ermine birch and Japanese white birch), tundra (moss, lichen and shrub), and some meadows. Common tall herbs include Jacobaea cannabifolia (Aleutian ragwort), and Filipendula camtschatica.

== Fauna ==
The area is known for its very high population of brown bears (over 15,000 individuals), and for the extensive networks of streams supporting salmon spawning grounds. Scientists have recorded 104 species of fish in the Kronotsky area alone, and species inventory has only begun. The most common near-shore marine fish gobies, greenlings, pollock, herring, and flounder. Migratory salmon include pink, chum and coho. The rugged coasts are important for colonies of migratory seabirds, particularly those wintering in the area. Important mammals include bear, reindeer, sable (now protected in Kronotsky), wolves, and sea otters.

Coastal Kamchatka is a breeding ground for the critically endangered Spoon-billed sandpiper.

== Protections ==
The Kronotsky area in the southeast of the peninsula is a UNESCO Man and Biosphere (MAB) Biosphere Reserve.

The federally protected areas in the region are:

- Kronotsky Nature Reserve. An IUCN class Ia "strict ecological reserve" (a Zapovednik) in the southeast of the Kamchatka peninsula (Area: 11,421 km2)
- Komandorsky Nature Reserve ("Commander Islands"). An IUCN class Ia "strict ecological reserve" (a Zapovednik) to the east of the Kamchatka peninsula (Area: 36,648 km2)
- South Kamchatka Sanctuary. A federally protected area on the southern tip of Kamchatka peninsula. (Area: 3,320 km2)

== See also ==
- List of ecoregions in Russia
