= Forest-tundra =

Transitional zone between forest and tundra

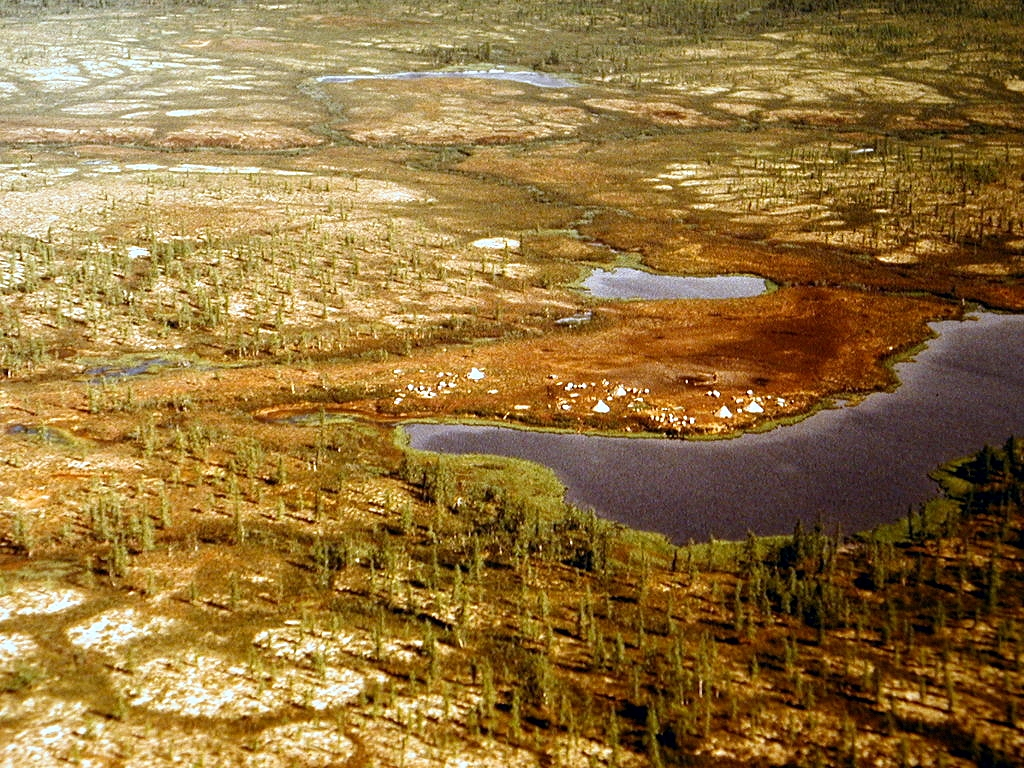
Forest tundra in Russia

In physical geography, a forest-tundra is a type of terrestrial ecosystem (biome) which is transitional zone (ecotone) between tundra and forest.

The term was coined by Frederic Clements in 1936, for the transitional zone between subalpine forest and alpine tundra. Later its meaning was extended to include the transition between taiga and tundra.

The forest-tundra is found almost exclusively in the northern hemisphere within the Southern Arctic Ecozone. In North America, the tundra extends southwards to below 50° N. In Eurasia, the approximately 20–200 km wide strip of the tundra between 40° and 90° E straddling the Arctic Circle (66°30' N).

In the framework of the altitudinal gradation of mountainous ecology, the forest-tundra corresponds to the krummholz and prostrate shrub zones.

Larger cities within the ecozone include Murmansk, Vorkuta, Norilsk, and Tiksi.

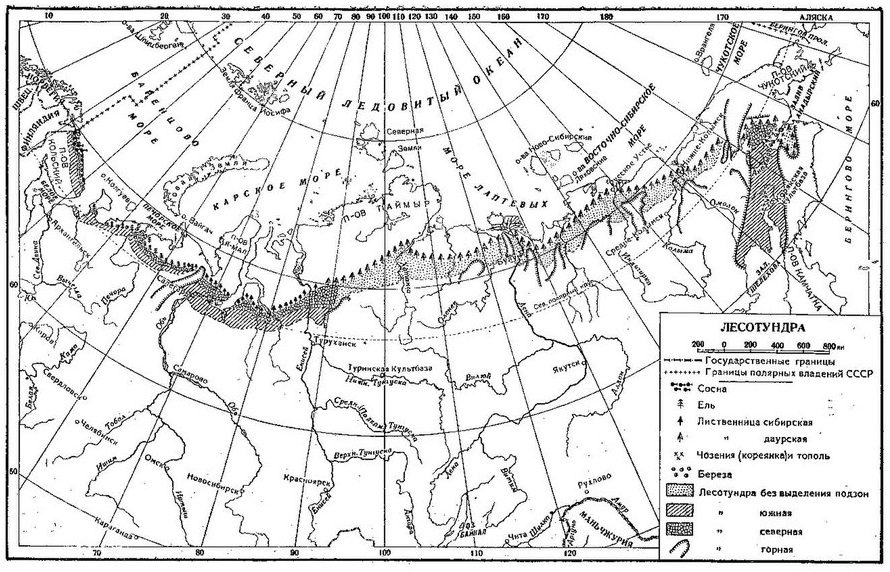
Map of forest-tundra

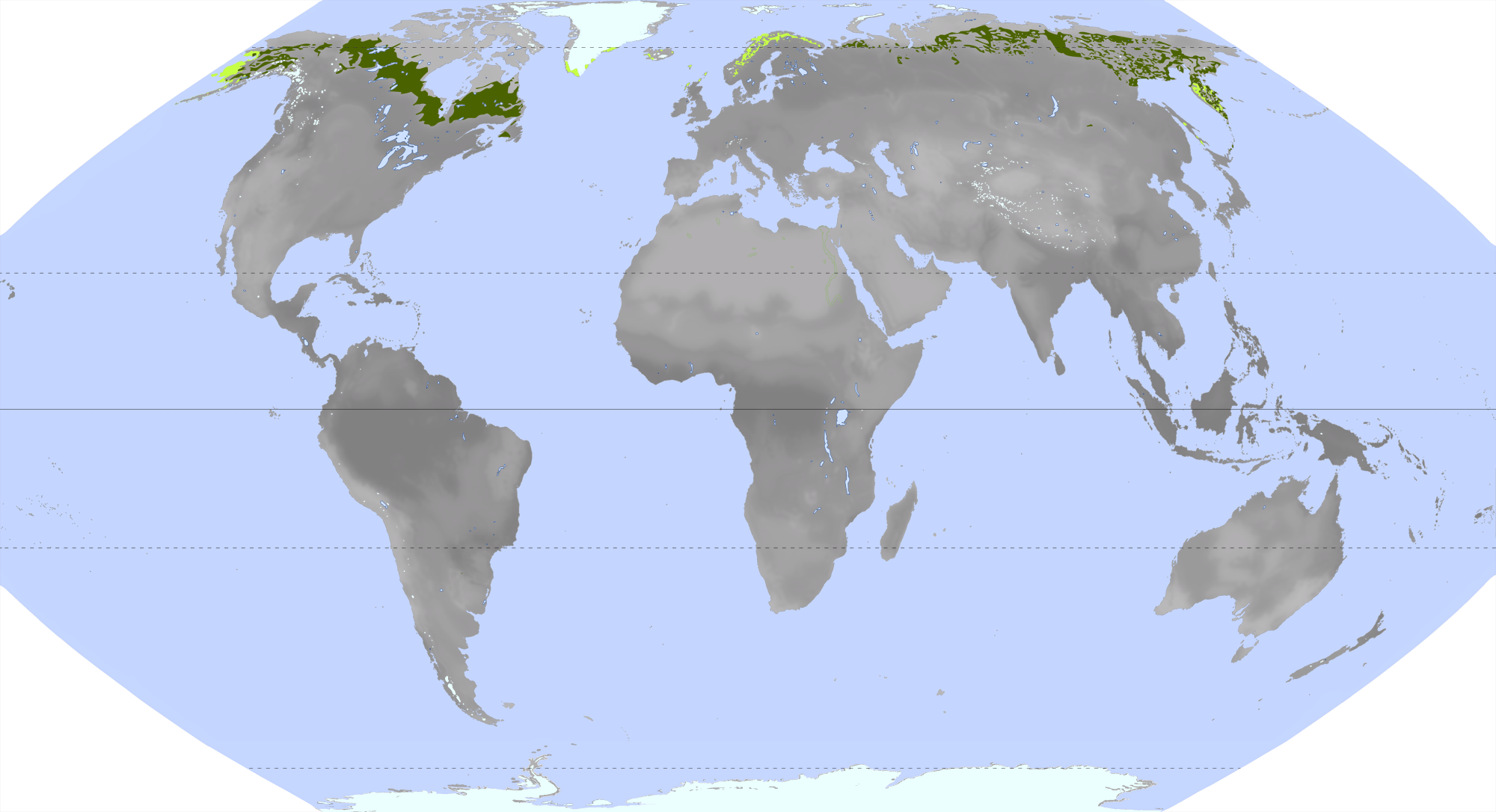
Map of forest-tundra
