= Northeast Siberian coastal tundra =

Ecoregion in Siberia, Russia

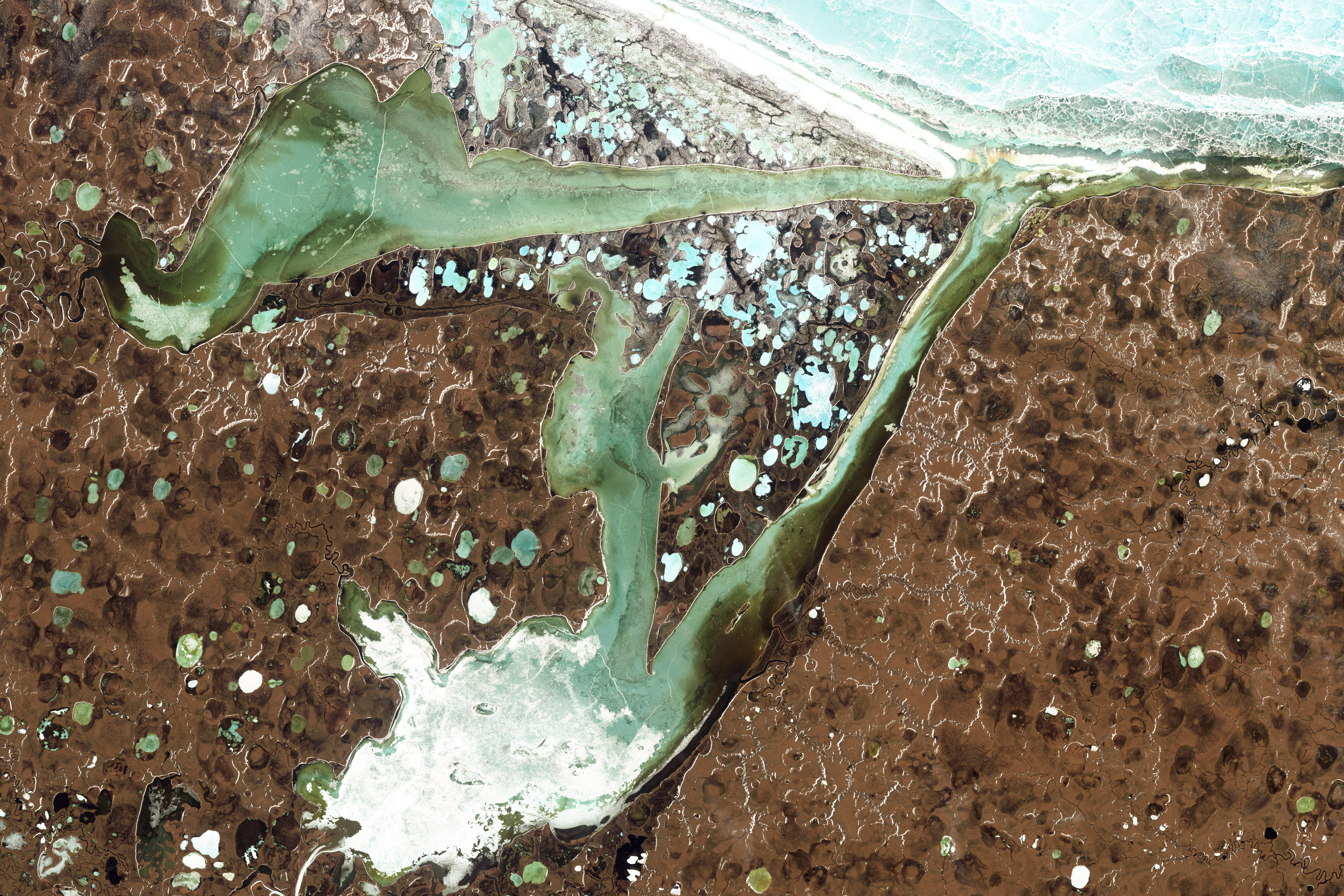
- Omulyakhskaya and Khromskaya Bays, Northern Siberia. Note the thermokarst lakes.

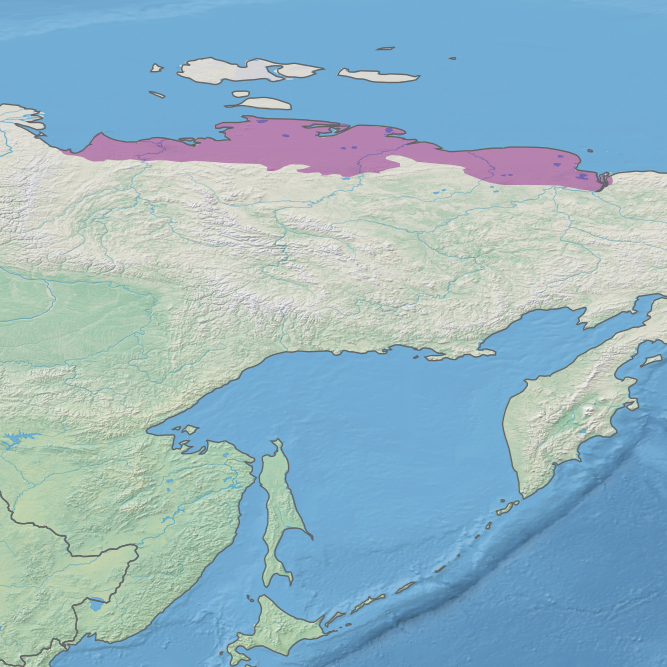
- Ecoregion territory (in purple)

Ecology
- Realm: Palearctic
- Biome: tundra

Geography
- Area: 222,480 km^{2} (85,900 sq mi)
- Countries: Russia
- Coordinates: 70.75°N 146.75°E

The Northeast Siberian coastal tundra ecoregion (WWF ID: PA1107) is an ecoregion that covers the coastal plain of the central north region of Siberia in Russia. This coastal region borders the Laptev Sea and the East Siberian Sea, both marginal seas of the Arctic Ocean, from the Lena River delta in the west to the Kolyma River delta in the east. There are several large river deltas in the area that support breeding grounds for 60 to 80 species of migratory birds. The region is in the Palearctic realm, and the tundra biome. It has an area of 846,149 square kilometres (326,700 sq mi).

== Location and description ==
The ecoregion stretches 1,100 km along the north coast of Siberia, from the Lena River delta in the west to the Kolyma River delta in the east. The terrain is flat and rolling tundra. The entire region is on continuous permafrost. Thermokarst lakes are common, caused by the freezing and thawing of permafrost.

== Climate ==
The region has a subarctic (Dfc) and tundra climate (ET). Mean precipitation is about 200 mm/year. The mean temperature at the center of the ecoregion is −37 °C (−35 °F) in January, and 11.1 °C (52.0 °F) in July.

== Flora and fauna ==
Plants of the ecoregion are those typical of the tundra landscape, with some isolated strands of larch taiga in the southern sectors. Dwarf shrubs, grasses, sedges, and moss are dominant. Common plant families include cotton grasses (Eriophorum), sedges (Carex), Dryas, willows (Salix), and various species of Vaccinium.

== See also ==
- List of ecoregions in Russia
- East Siberian Lowland
