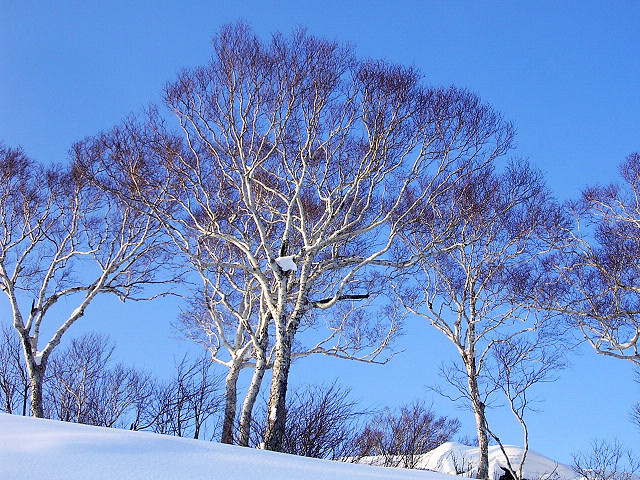

Conservation status
- Least Concern (IUCN 3.1)

Scientific classification
- Kingdom: Plantae
- Clade: Embryophytes
- Clade: Tracheophytes
- Clade: Angiosperms
- Clade: Eudicots
- Clade: Rosids
- Order: Fagales
- Family: Betulaceae
- Genus: Betula
- Subgenus: Betula subg. Neurobetula
- Species: B. ermanii

Binomial name
- Betula ermanii Cham.

Varieties
- Betula ermanii var. ermanii; Betula ermanii var. lanata Regel

Synonyms
- Betula ermanii var. genuina Regel

= Betula ermanii =

Erman's birch

Species of tree

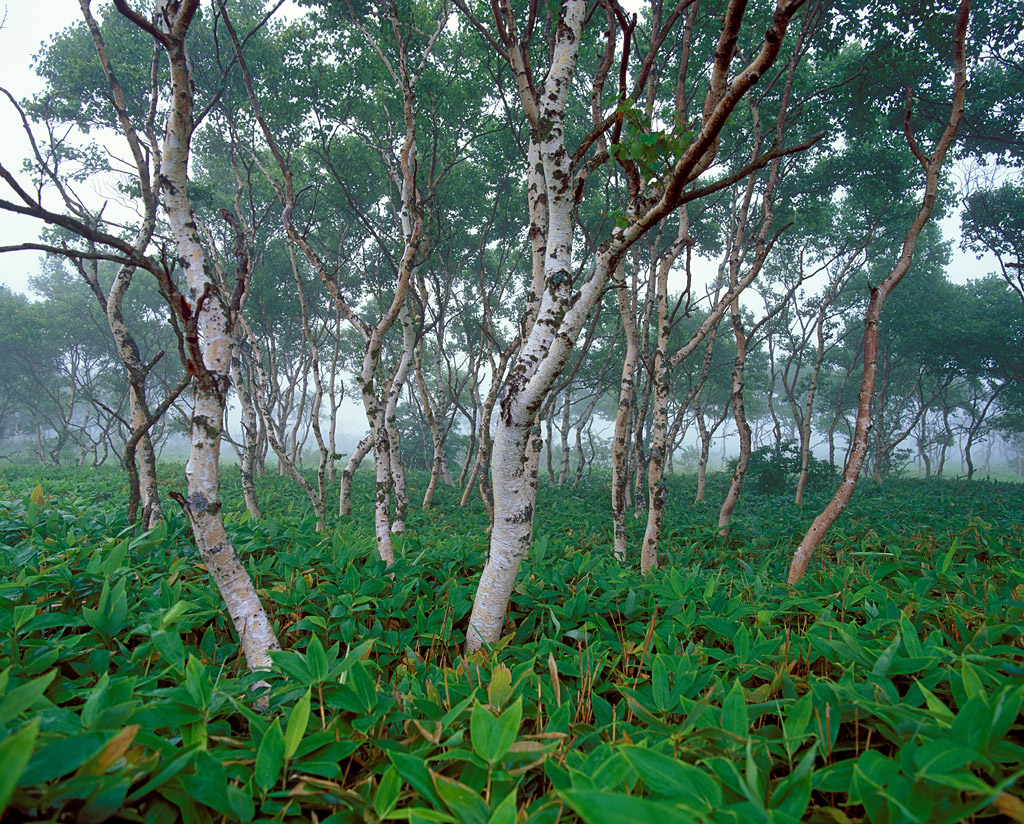
Kurils Nature Reserve

Betula ermanii, or Erman's birch, is a species of birch tree belonging to the family Betulaceae. It is an extremely variable species and can be found in Northeast China, Korea, Japan, and Russian Far East (Kuril Islands, Sakhalin, Kamchatka). It can grow to 20 metres (66 ft) tall. It is noted for its peeling bark, which can sometimes be removed in sheets, but usually shreds and hangs from the trunk and under branches. Yellow-brown male catkins appear with the leaves in spring.

Erman's birch is widely cultivated outside its natural range. The cultivar 'Grayswood Hill' has gained the Royal Horticultural Society's Award of Garden Merit.

Japanese white birch on the left, and Erman's Birch on the right

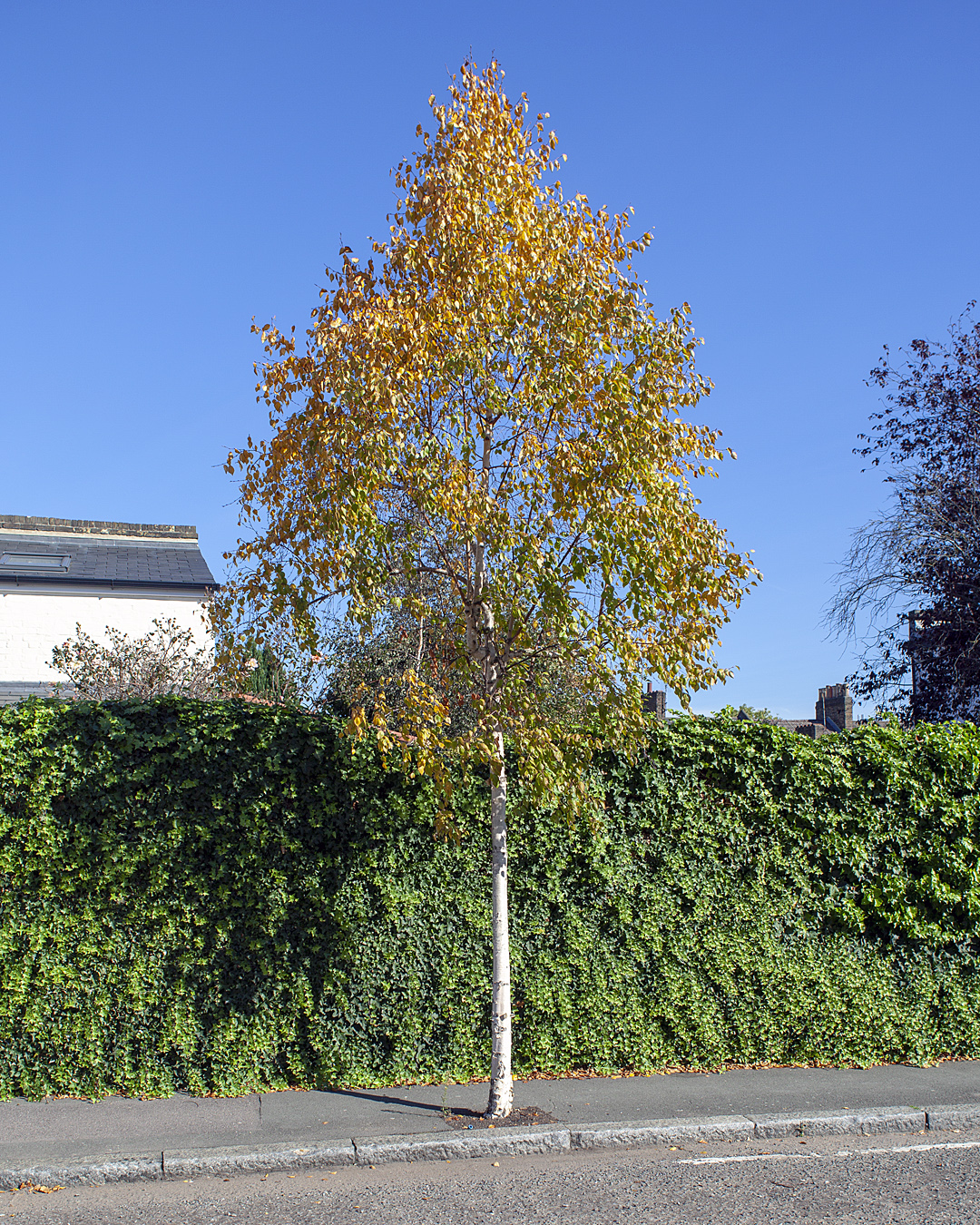
Street tree in Brockley, south east London
