= Tundra =

Biome with frigid temperatures

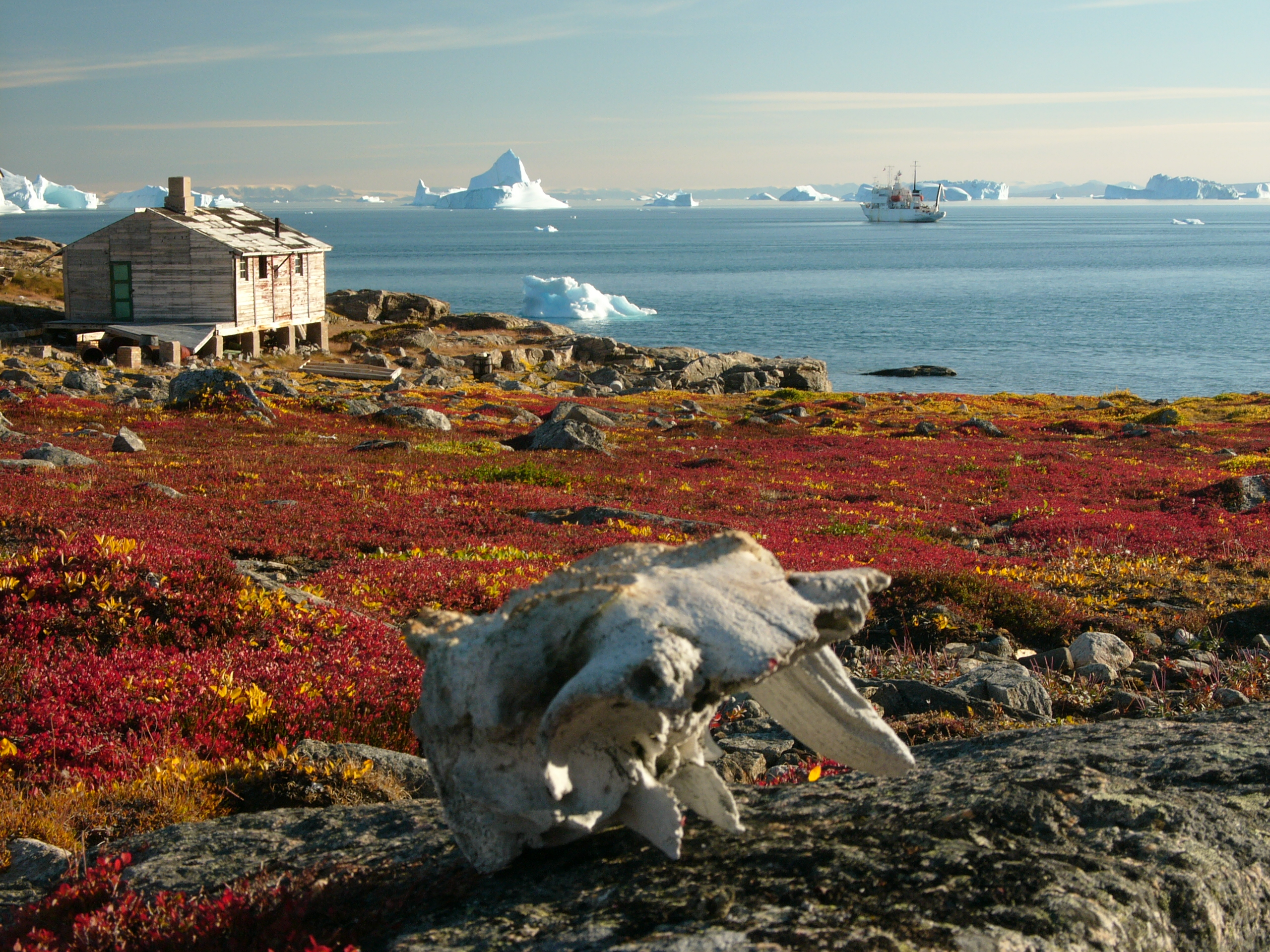
- Tundra in Greenland

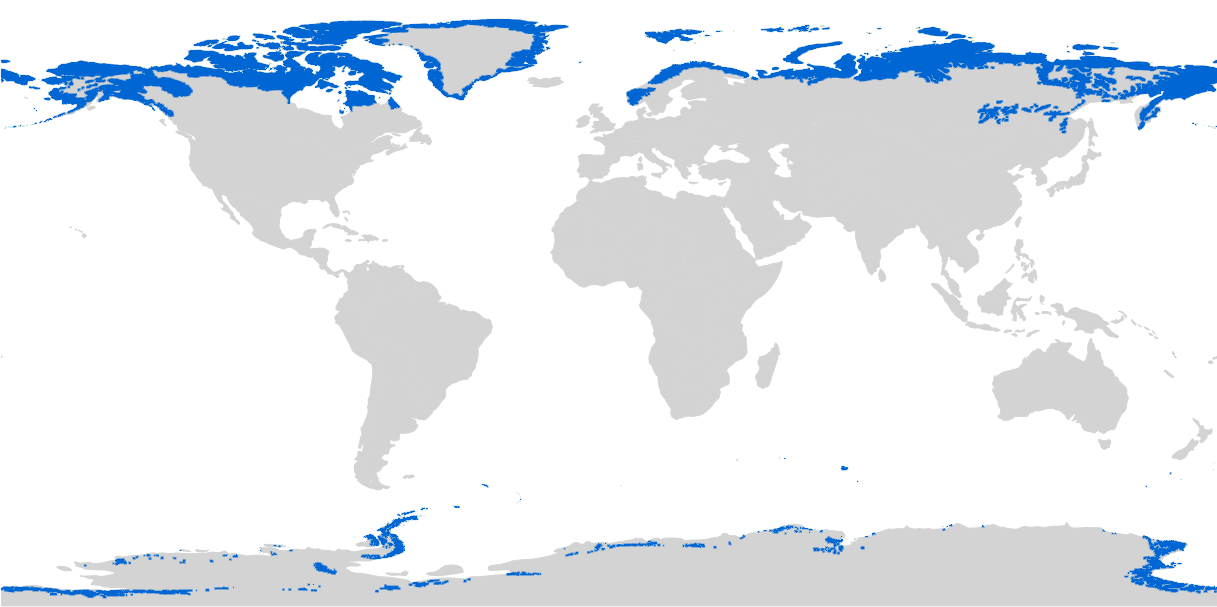
- extent of the Arctic and Antarctic tundra

Geography
- Area: 11,563,300 km^{2} (4,464,600 mi^{2})
- Climate type: ET

In physical geography, a tundra (/ˈtʌndrə, ˈtʊn-/) is a type of biome where tree growth is hindered by frigid temperatures and short growing seasons. There are three regions and associated types of tundra: Arctic, Alpine, and Antarctic.

Tundra vegetation is composed of dwarf shrubs, sedges, grasses, mosses, and lichens. Scattered trees grow in some tundra regions. The ecotone (or ecological boundary region) between the tundra and the forest is known as the tree line or timberline. The tundra soil is rich in nitrogen and phosphorus. The soil also contains large amounts of biomass and decomposed biomass that has been stored as methane and carbon dioxide in the permafrost, making the tundra soil a carbon sink. As global warming heats the ecosystem and causes soil thawing, the permafrost carbon cycle accelerates and releases much of these soil-contained greenhouse gases into the atmosphere, creating a feedback cycle that contributes to climate change.

== Etymology ==
The word comes from the Russian "ту́ндра" (tundra). The first use of tundra in English was in 1824, spelled "toundra", possibly indicating borrowing from French. The origin of the Russian word is uncertain: it may be a borrowing of the word "тундар" (tundar) the Sámi language family word for "fell", "elevated wasteland" or "marshy plain", from the 16th century. Some sources attribute the origin to Finnish tunturi for "treeless plain".

== Arctic ==
Arctic tundra occurs in the far Northern Hemisphere (Arctic), north of the taiga belt. The word "tundra" usually refers only to the areas where the subsoil is permafrost, or permanently frozen soil. (It may also refer to the treeless plain in general so that northern Sápmi would be included.) Permafrost tundra includes vast areas of northern Russia and Canada. The polar tundra is home to several peoples who are mostly nomadic reindeer herders, such as the Nganasan and Nenets in the permafrost area (and the Sámi in Sápmi).

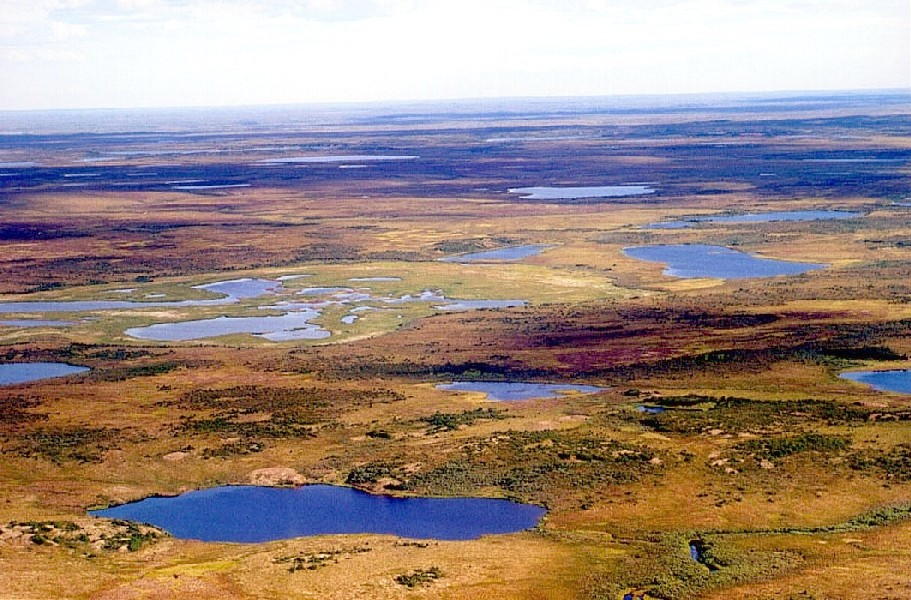
Tundra in Siberia

Arctic tundra contains areas of stark landscape and is frozen for much of the year. The soil there is frozen from 25 to 90 cm (10 to 35 in) down, making it impossible for trees to grow there. Instead, bare and sometimes rocky land can only support certain kinds of Arctic vegetation, low-growing plants such as moss, heath (Ericaceae varieties such as crowberry and black bearberry), and lichen.

There are two main seasons, winter and summer, in the polar tundra areas. During the winter it is very cold, dark, and windy with the average temperature around −28 °C (−18 °F), sometimes dipping as low as −50 °C (−58 °F). However, extreme cold temperatures on the tundra generally do not drop as low as those experienced in taiga areas further south (for example, Russia's, Canada's, and Alaska's lowest temperatures were recorded in locations south of the tree line). During the summer, temperatures rise somewhat, and the top layer of seasonally-frozen soil melts, leaving the ground very soggy. The tundra is covered in marshes, lakes, bogs, and streams during the warm months. Generally daytime temperatures during the summer rise to about 12 °C (54 °F) but can often drop to 3 °C (37 °F) or even below freezing. Arctic tundras are sometimes the subject of habitat conservation programs. In Canada and Russia, many of these areas are protected through a national biodiversity action plan.

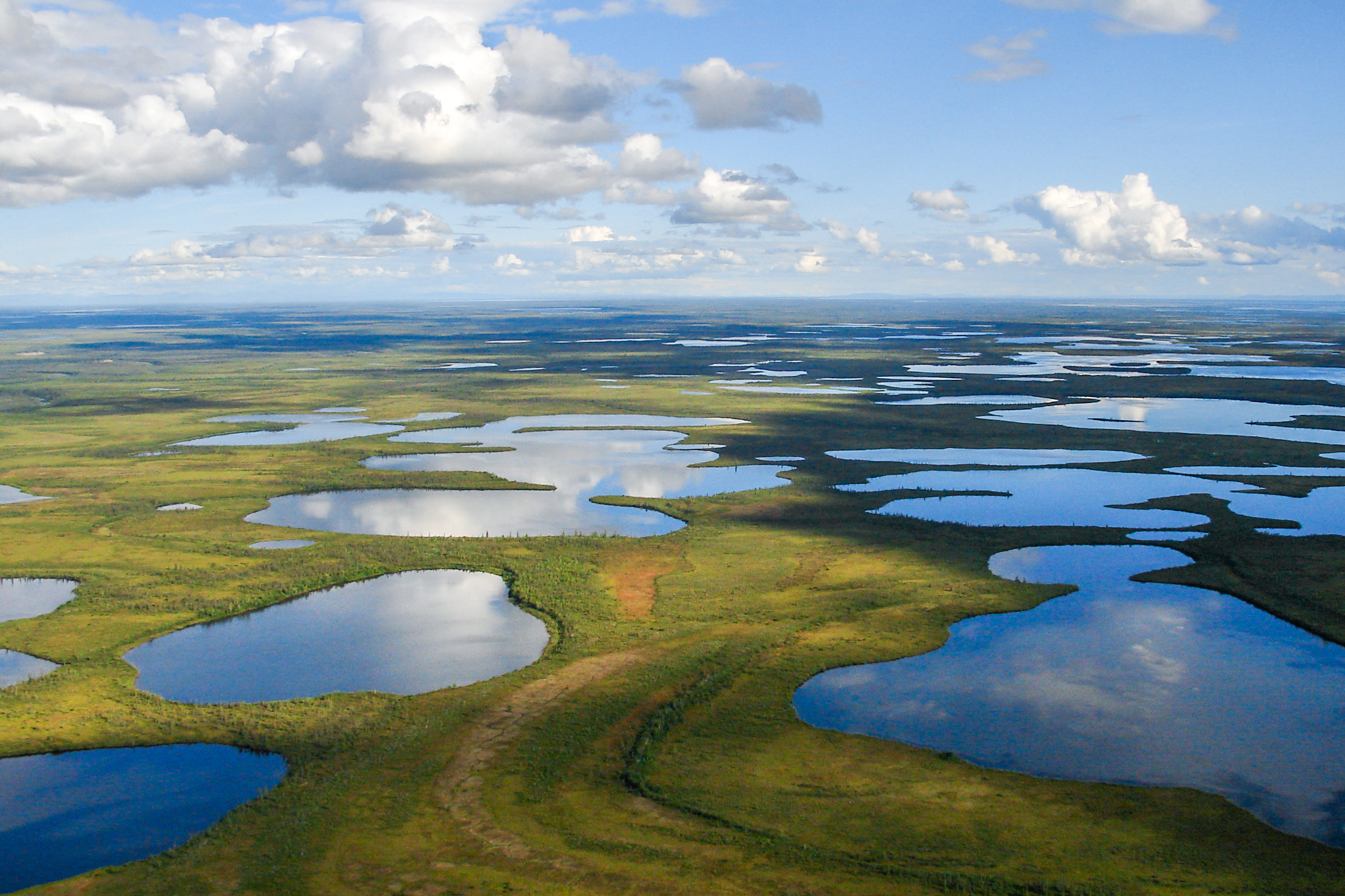
Vuntut National Park in Canada

Arctic tundra tends to be windy, with winds often blowing upwards of 50–100 km/h (31–62 mph). It is also a polar desert, with only about 150–250 mm (6–10 in) of precipitation falling per year (the summer is typically the season of maximum precipitation). Although precipitation is light, evaporation is also relatively minimal. During the summer, the permafrost thaws just enough to let plants grow and reproduce, but because the ground below this is frozen, the water cannot sink any lower, so the water forms the lakes and marshes found during the summer months. There is a natural pattern of accumulation of fuel and wildfire which varies depending on the nature of vegetation and terrain. Research in Alaska has shown fire-event return intervals (FRIs) that typically vary from 150 to 200 years, with dryer lowland areas burning more frequently than wetter highland areas.

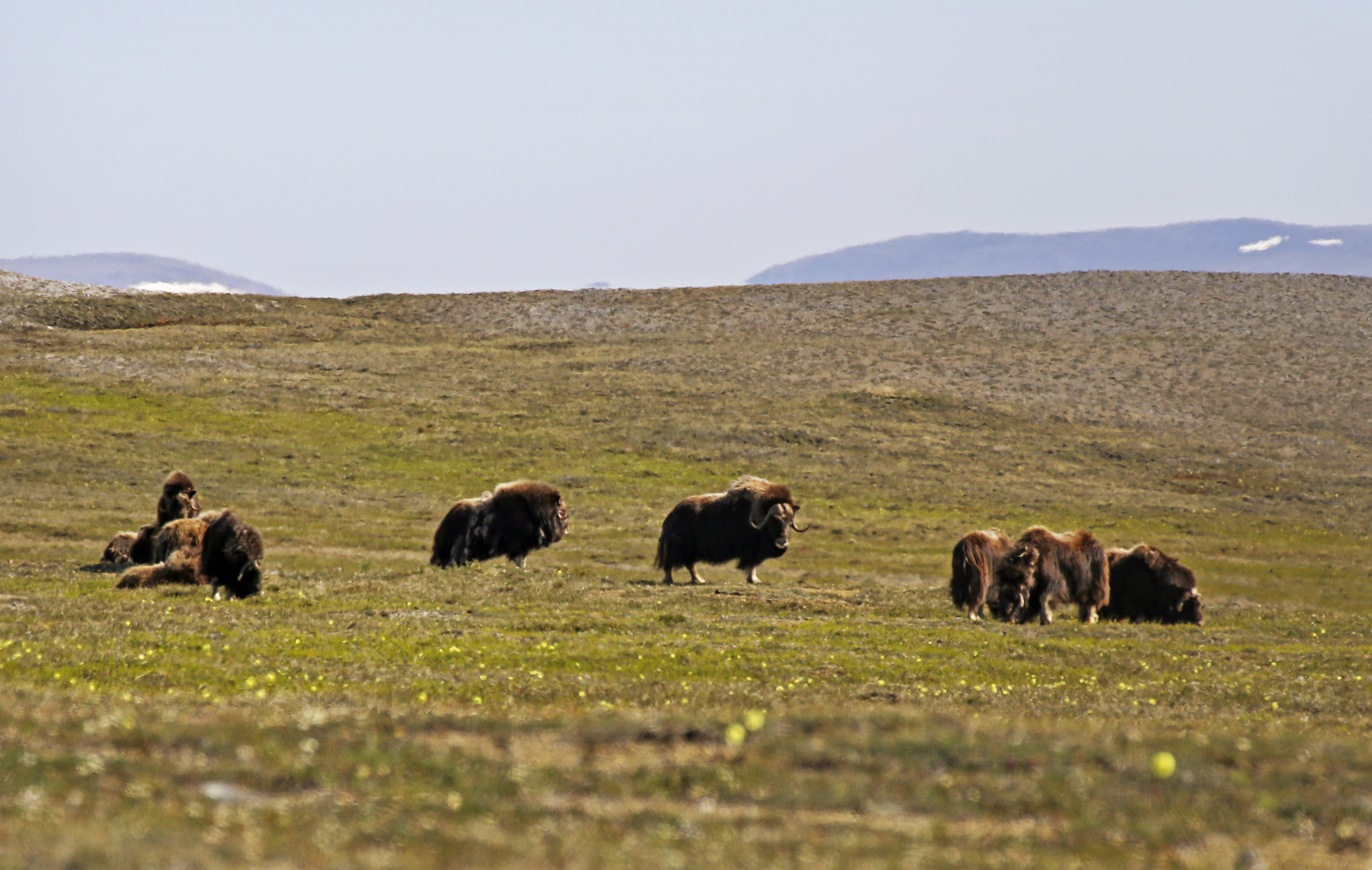
A small herd of muskoxen in the Kakagrak Hills, Alaska

The biodiversity of tundras is low: 1,700 species of vascular plants and only 48 species of land mammals can be found, although millions of birds migrate there each year for the marshes. There are also a few fish species. There are few species with large populations. Notable plants in the Arctic tundra include blueberry (Vaccinium uliginosum), crowberry (Empetrum nigrum), reindeer lichen (Cladonia rangiferina), lingonberry (Vaccinium vitis-idaea), and Labrador tea (Rhododendron groenlandicum). Notable animals include reindeer (caribou), musk ox, Arctic hare, Arctic fox, snowy owl, ptarmigan, northern red-backed voles, lemmings, the mosquito, and even polar bears near the ocean. The tundra is largely devoid of poikilotherms such as frogs or lizards.

Due to the harsh climate of Arctic tundra, regions of this kind have seen little human activity, even though they are sometimes rich in natural resources such as petroleum, natural gas, and uranium. In recent times this has begun to change in Alaska, Russia, and some other parts of the world: for example, the Yamalo-Nenets Autonomous Okrug produces 90% of Russia's natural gas.

=== Relationship to climate change ===
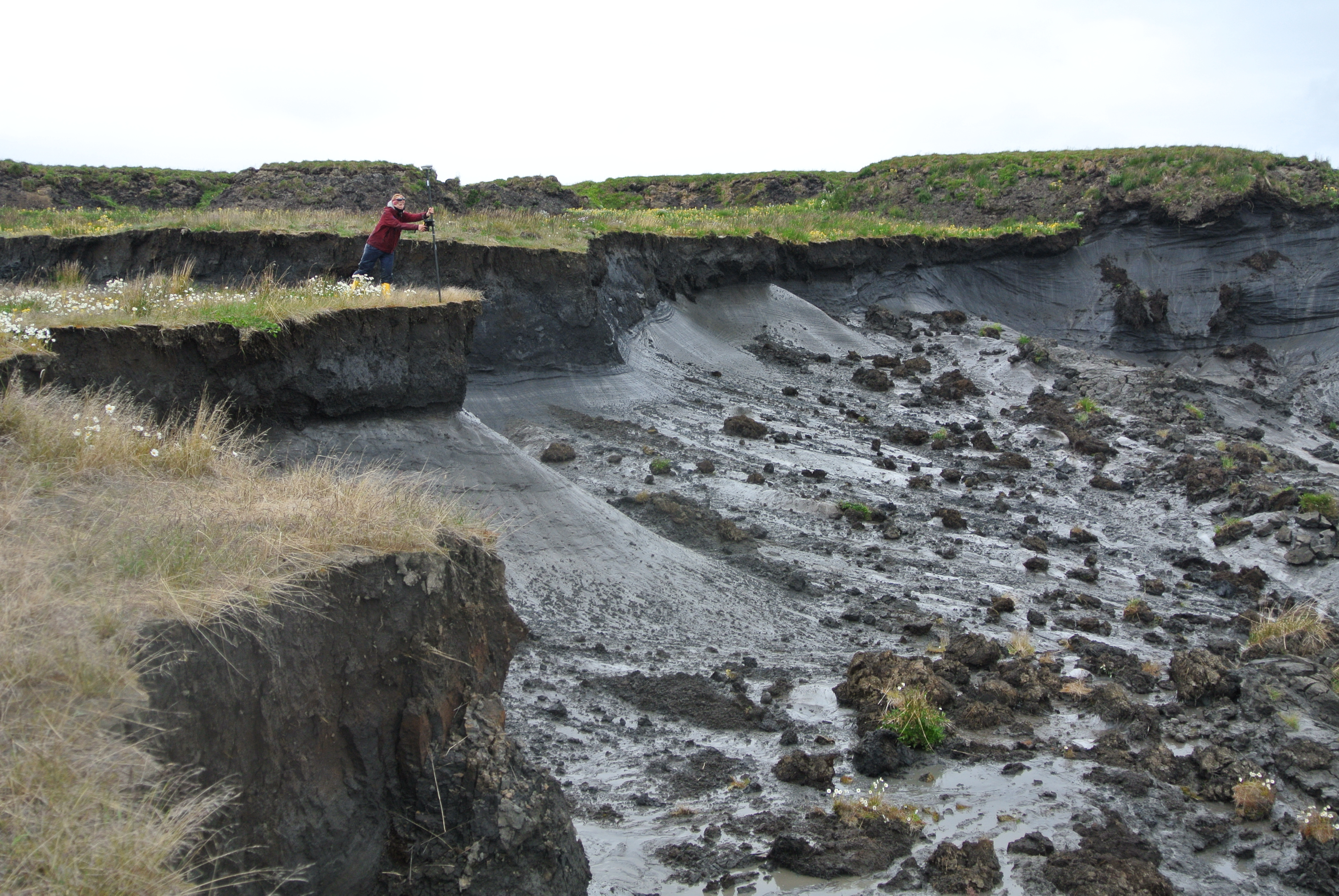
Permafrost thawing can cause slumping in the landscape

A severe threat to tundra is climate change, which causes permafrost to thaw. The thawing of the permafrost in a given area on human time scales (decades or centuries) could radically change which species can survive there. It also represents a significant risk to infrastructure built on top of permafrost, such as roads and pipelines.

In locations where dead vegetation and peat have accumulated, there is a risk of wildfire, such as the 1,039 km^{2} (401 sq mi) of tundra which burned in 2007 on the north slope of the Brooks Range in Alaska. Such events may both result from and contribute to global warming.

Carbon emissions from permafrost thaw contribute to the same warming which facilitates the thaw, making it a positive climate change feedback. The warming also intensifies the Arctic water cycle, and the increased amounts of warmer rain are another factor which increases permafrost thaw depths.

The IPCC Sixth Assessment Report estimates that carbon dioxide and methane released from permafrost could amount to the equivalent of 14–175 billion tonnes (1.4×10^{10}–1.72×10^{11} long tons; 1.5×10^{10}–1.93×10^{11} short tons) carbon dioxide per 1 °C (1.8 °F) of warming. For comparison, by 2019, annual anthropogenic emission of carbon dioxide alone stood around 40 billion tonnes (3.9×10^{10} long tons; 4.4×10^{10} short tons). A 2018 perspectives article discussing tipping points in the climate system activated around 2 °C (3.6 °F) of global warming suggested that at this threshold, permafrost thaw would add a further 0.09 °C (0.16 °F) to global temperatures by 2100, with a range of 0.04–0.16 °C (0.07–0.29 °F)

== Antarctic ==
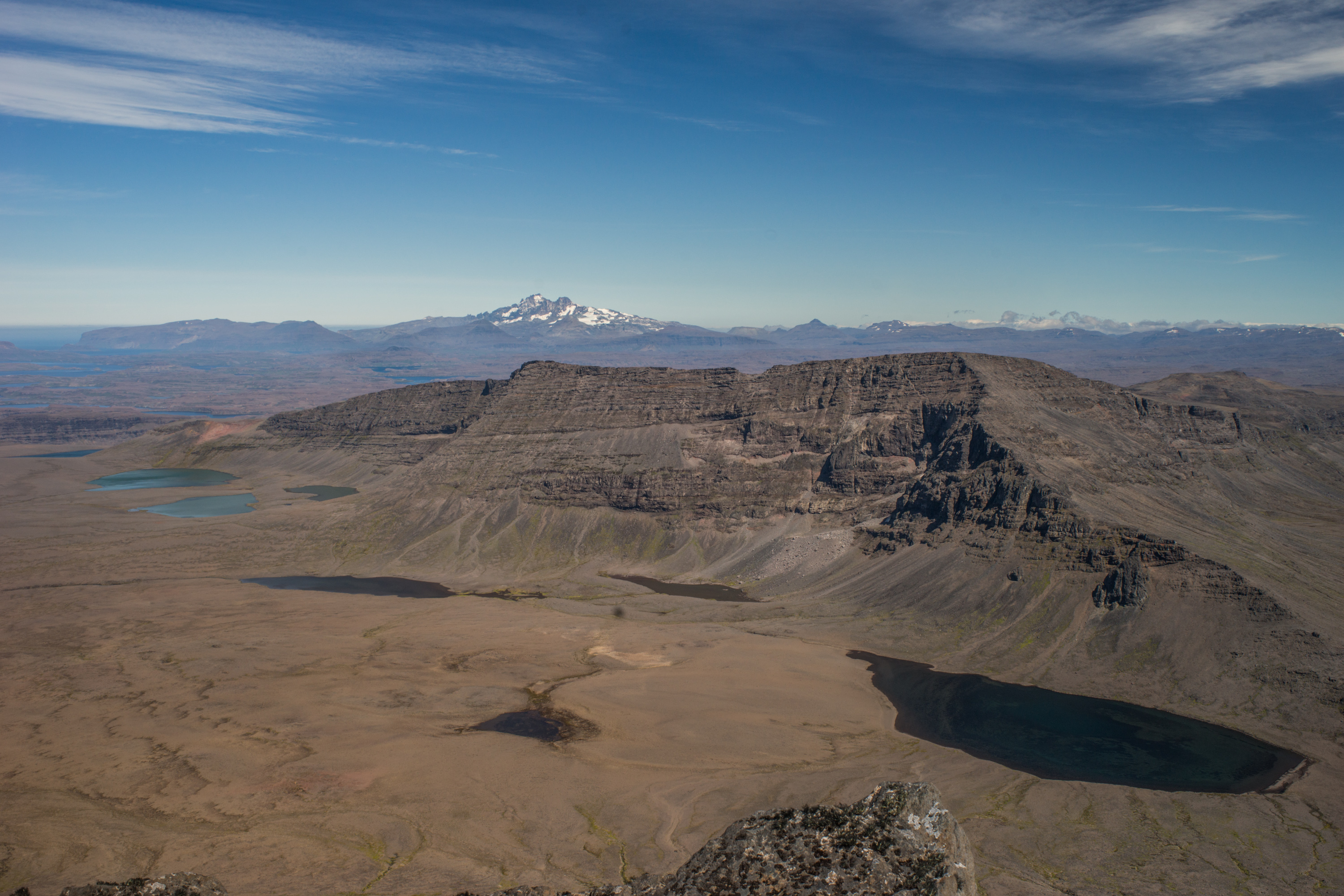
Tundra on the Kerguelen Islands.

Antarctic tundra occurs on Antarctica and on several Antarctic and subantarctic islands, including South Georgia and the South Sandwich Islands and the Kerguelen Islands. Most of Antarctica is too cold and dry to support vegetation, and most of the continent is covered by ice fields or cold deserts. However, some portions of the continent, particularly the Antarctic Peninsula, have areas of rocky soil that support plant life. The flora presently consists of around 300–400 species of lichens, 100 mosses, 25 liverworts, and around 700 terrestrial and aquatic algae species, which live on the areas of exposed rock and soil around the shore of the continent. Antarctica's two flowering plant species, the Antarctic hair grass (Deschampsia antarctica) and Antarctic pearlwort (Colobanthus quitensis), are found on the northern and western parts of the Antarctic Peninsula.

In contrast with the Arctic tundra, the Antarctic tundra lacks a large mammal fauna, mostly due to its physical isolation from the other continents. Sea mammals and seabirds, including seals and penguins, inhabit areas near the shore, and some small mammals, like rabbits and cats, have been introduced by humans to some of the subantarctic islands.

The Antipodes Subantarctic Islands tundra is a tundra ecoregion in the south Pacific that includes the Bounty Islands, Auckland Islands, Antipodes Islands, the Campbell Islands, and Macquarie Island. Species endemic to this ecoregion include the windswept helmet-orchid (Corybas dienemus) and the grooved helmet-orchid (Corybas sulcatus), the only subantarctic orchids; the royal penguin; and the Antipodean albatross.

There is some ambiguity on whether Magellanic moorland, on the west coast of Patagonia, should be considered tundra or not. Edmundo Pisano, a Chilean Phytogeographer, called it tundra (Spanish: tundra Magallánica) since he considered the low temperatures key to restrict plant growth. More recent approaches have since recognized it as a temperate grassland, restricting southern tundra to coastal Antarctica and its islands.

The flora and fauna of Antarctica and the Antarctic Islands (south of 60° south latitude) are protected by the Antarctic Treaty System.

== Alpine ==
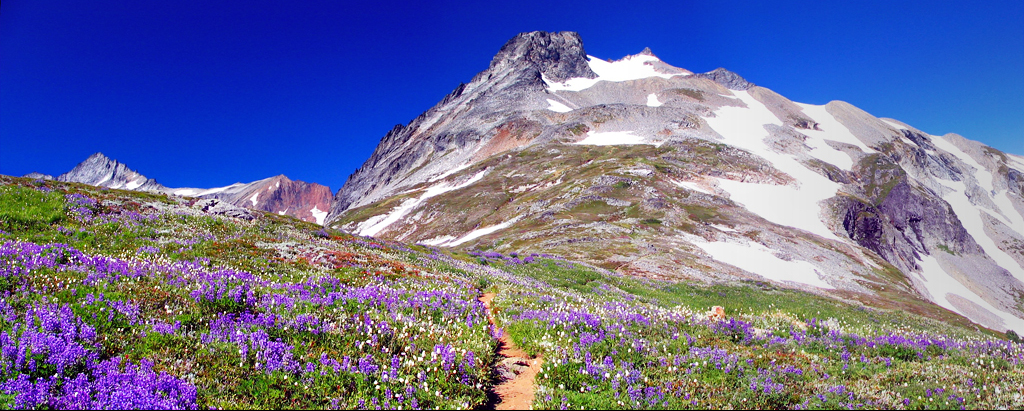
Alpine tundra in the North Cascades of Washington, United States

Alpine tundra does not contain trees because the climate and soils at high altitude block tree growth. The cold climate of the alpine tundra is caused by the low air temperatures, and is similar to polar climate. Alpine tundra is generally better drained than arctic soils. Alpine tundra transitions to subalpine forests below the tree line; stunted forests occurring within the forest-tundra ecotone are known as Krummholz. Alpine tundra can be affected by woody plant encroachment.

Alpine tundra occurs in mountains worldwide. The flora of the alpine tundra is characterized by plants that grow close to the ground, including perennial grasses, sedges, forbs, cushion plants, mosses, and lichens. The flora is adapted to the harsh conditions of the alpine environment, which include low temperatures, dryness, ultraviolet radiation, and a short growing season.

== Climatic classification ==
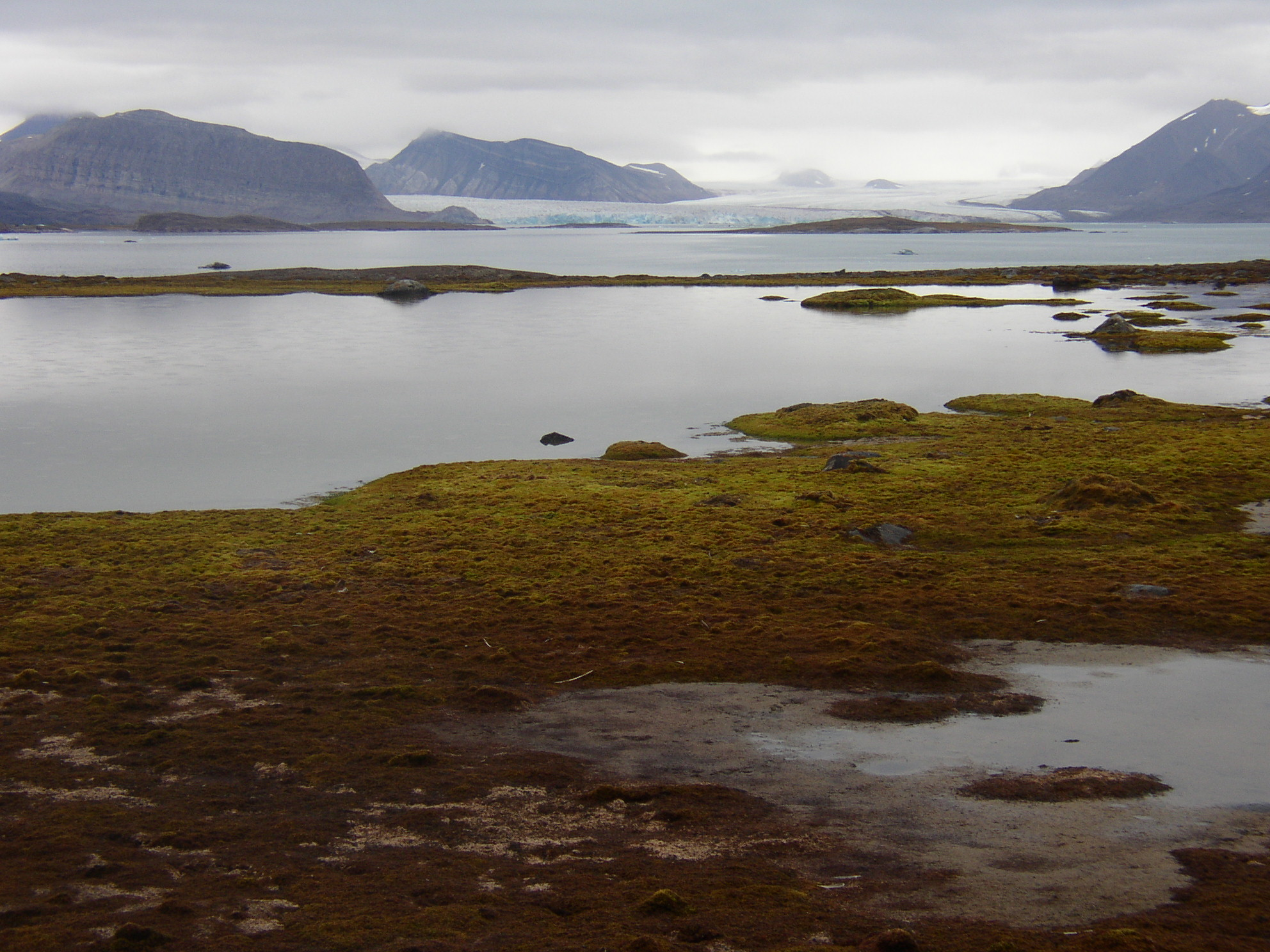
Tundra region with fjords, glaciers and mountains. Kongsfjorden, Spitsbergen.

Tundra climates ordinarily fit the Köppen climate classification ET, signifying a local climate in which at least one month has an average temperature high enough to melt snow (0 °C (32 °F)), but no month with an average temperature in excess of 10 °C (50 °F). The cold limit generally meets the EF climates of permanent ice and snows; the warm-summer limit generally corresponds with the poleward or altitudinal limit of trees, where they grade into the subarctic climates designated Dfd, Dwd and Dsd (extreme winters as in parts of Siberia), Dfc typical in Alaska, Canada, mountain areas of Scandinavia, European Russia, and Western Siberia (cold winters with months of freezing).

Despite the potential diversity of climates in the ET category involving precipitation, extreme temperatures, and relative wet and dry seasons, this category is rarely subdivided. Rainfall and snowfall are generally slight due to the low vapor pressure of water in the chilly atmosphere, but as a rule potential evapotranspiration is extremely low, allowing soggy terrain of swamps and bogs even in places that get precipitation typical of deserts of lower and middle latitudes. The amount of native tundra biomass depends more on the local temperature than the amount of precipitation.

== See also ==
- Alas
- Fellfield
- List of tundra ecoregions from the World Wide Fund for Nature
- Mammoth steppe
- Park Tundra
- Tundra of North America
- International Tundra Experiment
