= Eurasian Steppe =

Steppe ecoregion of grasslands, savannas, and shrublands

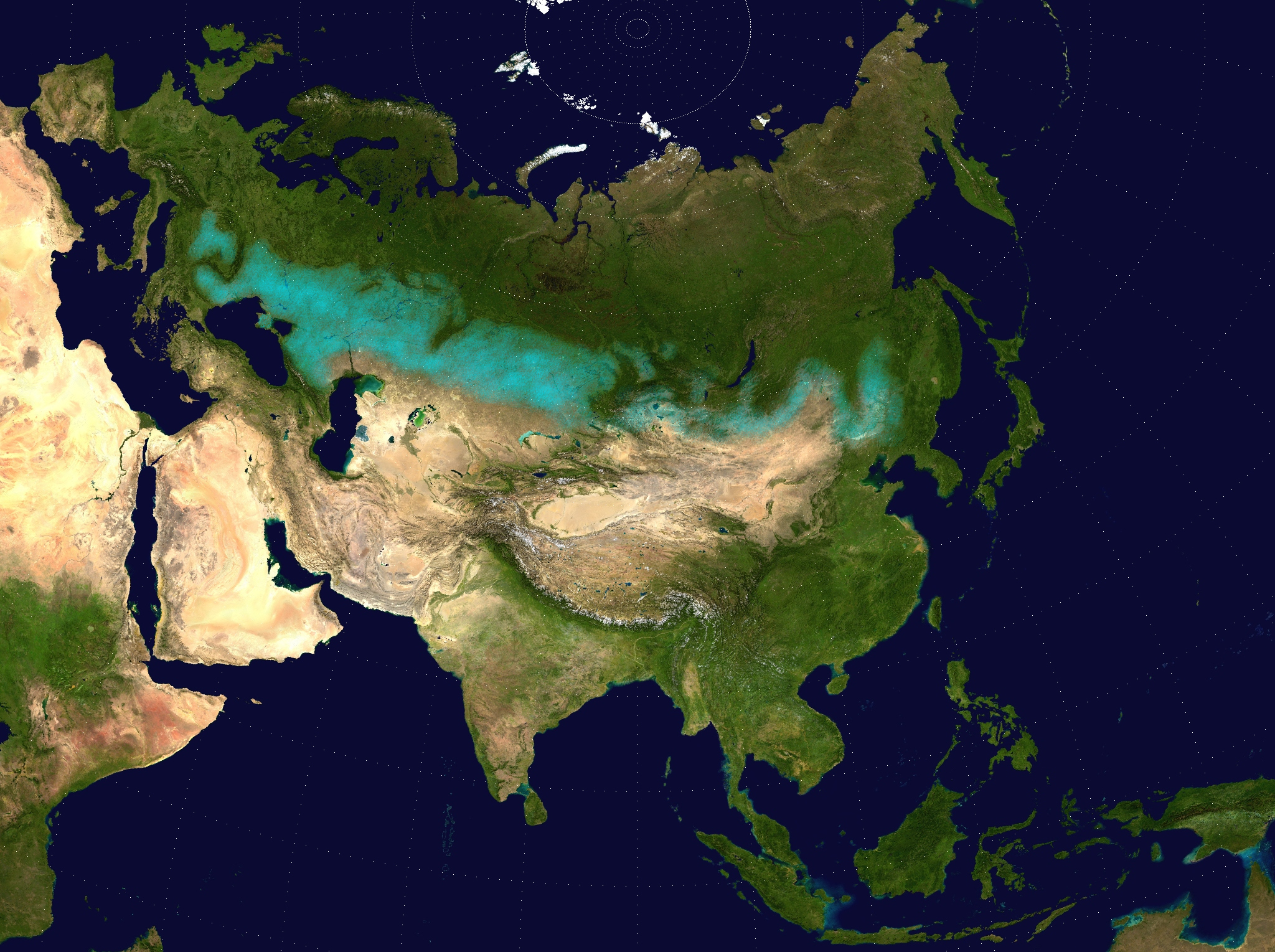
Eurasian steppe belt (turquoise)

The Eurasian Steppe, also called the Great Steppe or The Steppe, is an area of grassland in Eurasia that is mostly located in the temperate grasslands, savannas, and shrublands biome. It stretches westward some 8000 kilometres (5000 miles) from Manchuria across Mongolia, Xinjiang, Kazakhstan, Russia, Ukraine, Moldova, Romania and Hungary.

Since the Paleolithic age, the Steppe Route has been the main overland route between Eastern Europe, North Asia, Central Asia and East Asia economically, politically, and culturally. The Steppe route is a predecessor not only of the Silk Road, which developed during antiquity and the Middle Ages, but also of the Eurasian Land Bridge in the modern era. It has been home to nomadic empires and many large tribal confederations and ancient states throughout history, such as the Xiongnu, Scythia, Cimmeria, Sarmatia, Hunnic Empire, Sogdia, Xianbei, Mongol Empire, Magyar tribes, and Göktürk Khaganate.

== Geography ==
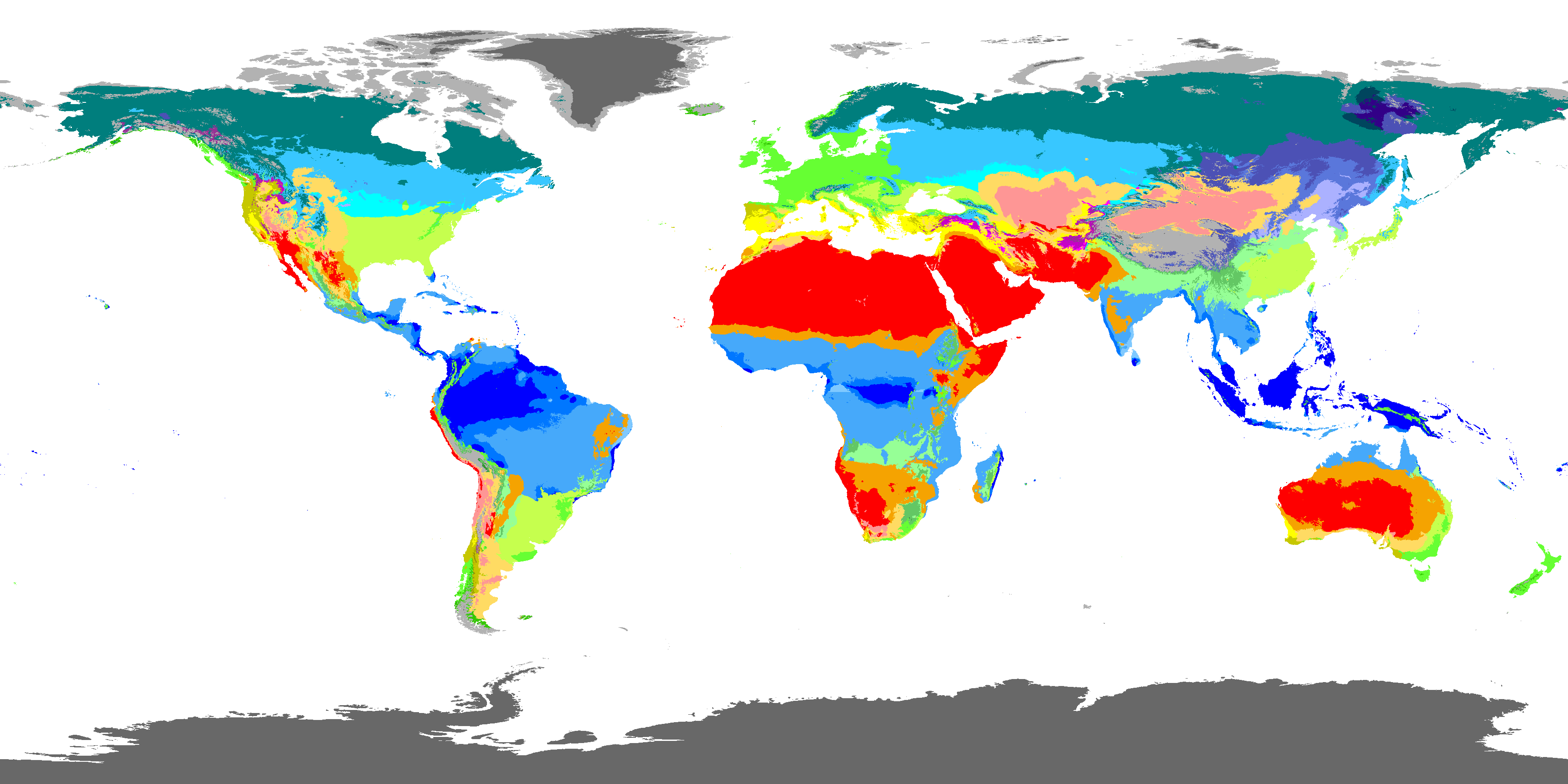
The Köppen climate classification

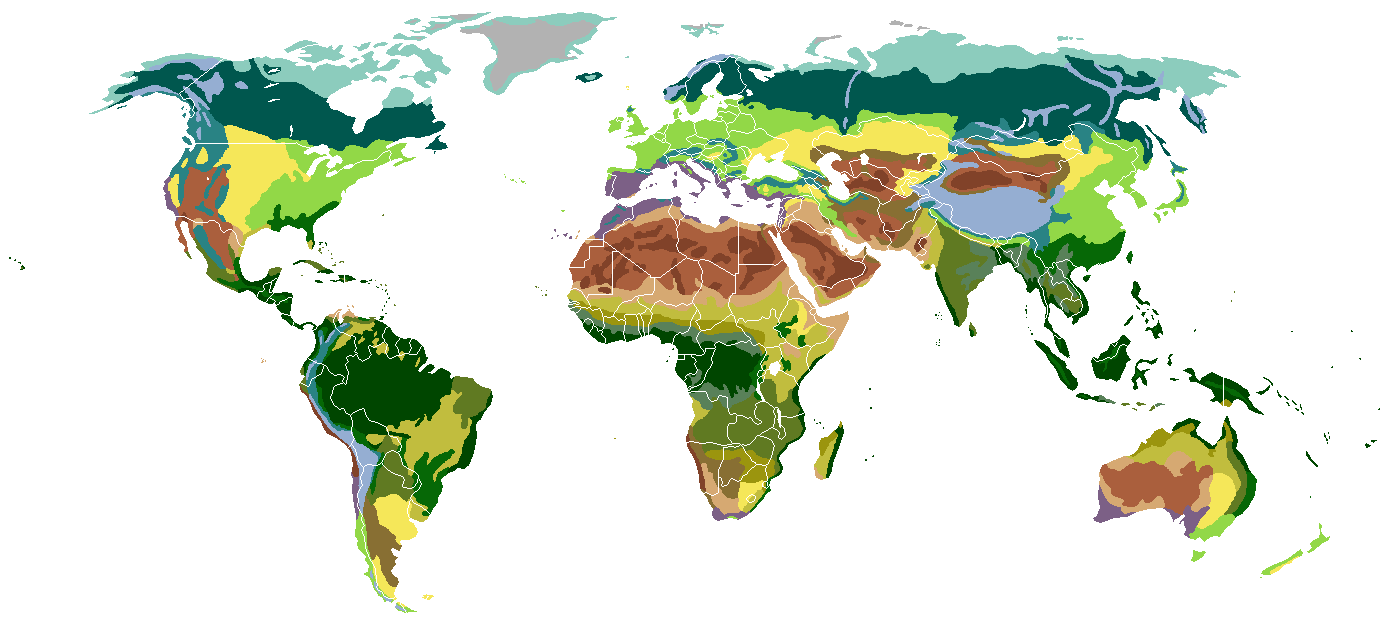
Biomes classified by vegetation

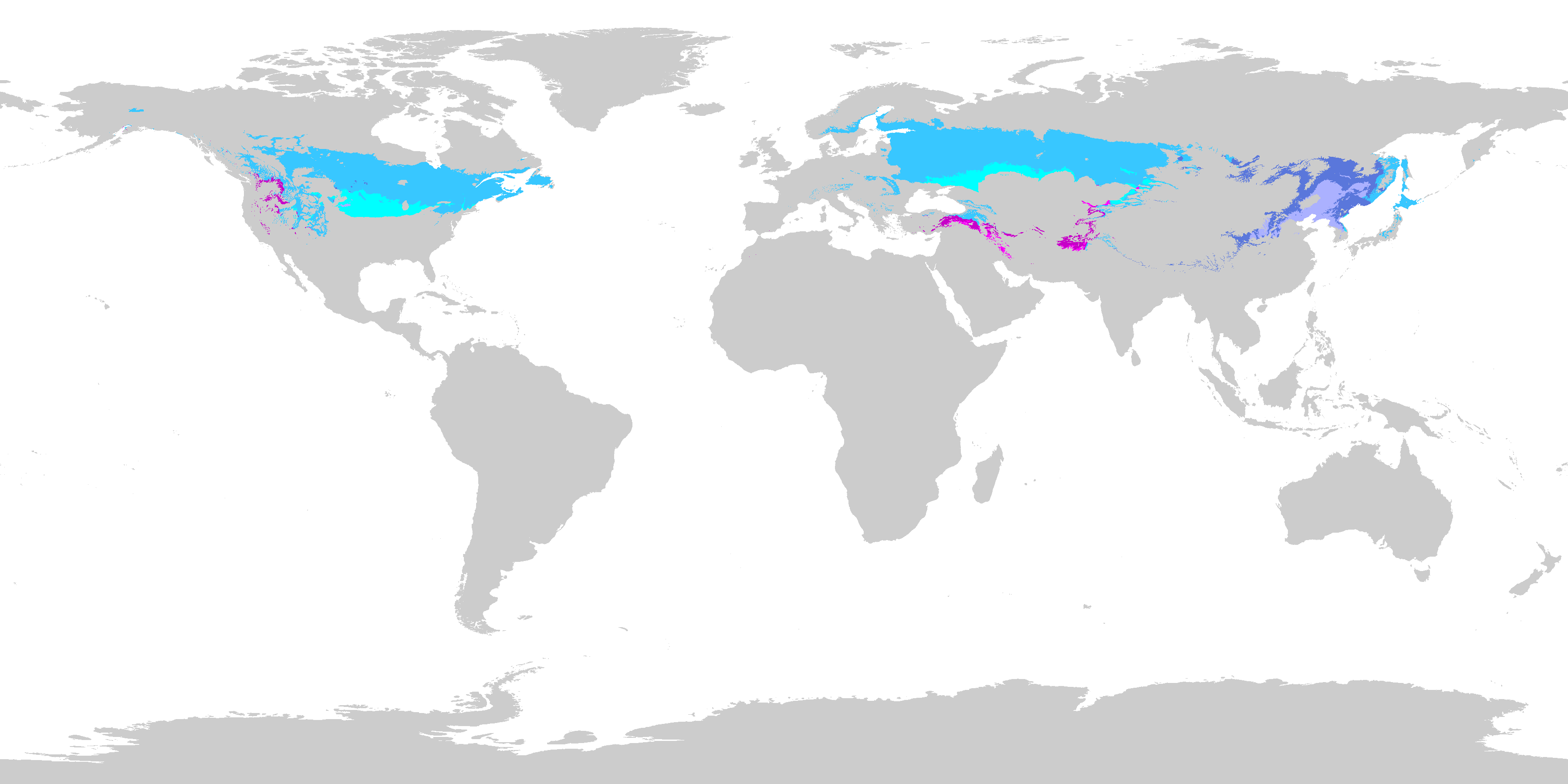
Humid continental climate worldwide, utilizing the Köppen climate classification

Cold steppe climate worldwide, utilizing the Köppen climate classification

The Eurasian Steppe is separated into three sections: the Carpathian Basin, the contiguous stretch of some 2,500 miles of grassland that stretches from the mouth of the Danube in Romania to the Altai Mountains on the China-Russia Border, and the Mongolian Plateau. The steppe is criss-crossed by mountain ranges that historically did not hinder the movement of nomads. In Asia the exact southern limit of the steppe is unclear since the steppe gets drier towards the south and eventually gives way to deserts such as the Kyzylkum and the Gobi. To the north the climate becomes increasingly humid, and the steppe grades into forests.

=== Pannonian Steppe ===
The Pannonian Steppe, or Peri-Carpathian Steppe, is the westernmost part of the Eurasian Steppe, separated from the Pontic-Caspian Steppe by the Carpathian Mountains. It encompasses most of Hungary and parts of southern Slovakia, western Romania, northern Bulgaria, northern Serbia, and eastern Austria.

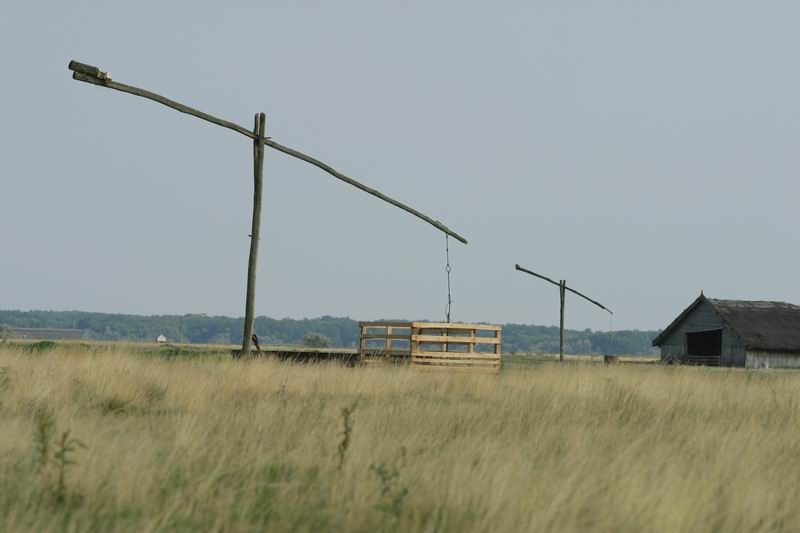
A draw well in Hortobágy National Park, Hungary

=== Pontic–Caspian Steppe ===
The Pontic–Caspian Steppe is the main European end of the Eurasian Steppe and begins near the mouth of the Danube, stretching northeast almost to Kazan and then southeast to the southern tip of the Ural Mountains. Its northern edge was a broad band of forest steppe which has now been obliterated by the conversion of the whole area to agricultural land. In the southeast the Black Sea–Caspian Steppe extends between the Black Sea and Caspian Sea to the Caucasus Mountains. On the north shore of the Black Sea, the Crimean Peninsula has some interior steppe and ports on the south coast which link the steppe to the civilizations of the Mediterranean basin.

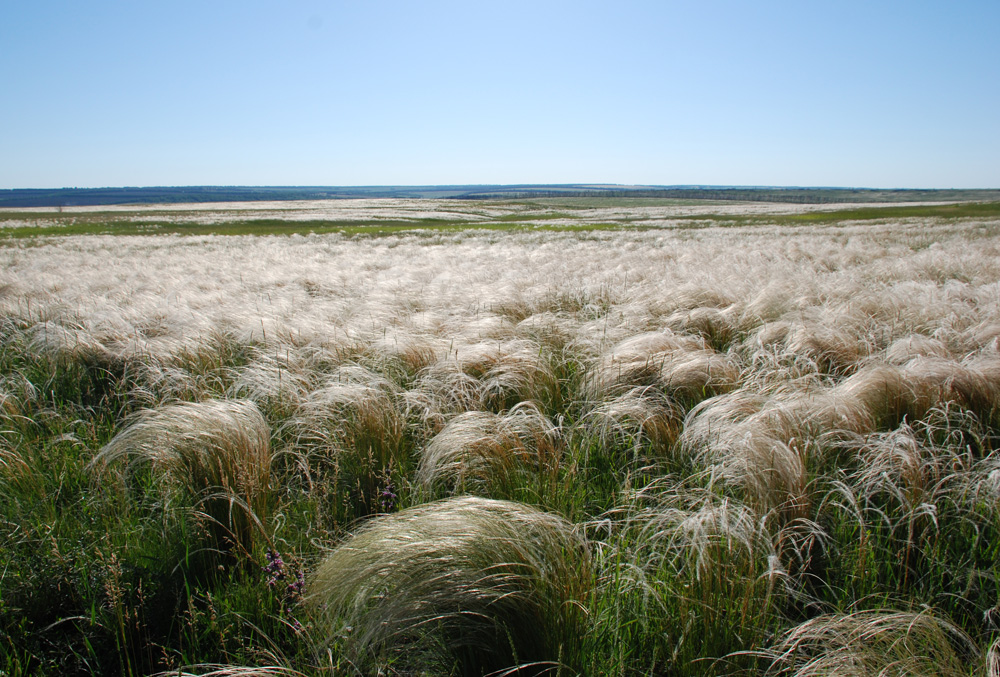
The Pontic–Caspian steppe near Krynychne, Ukraine.

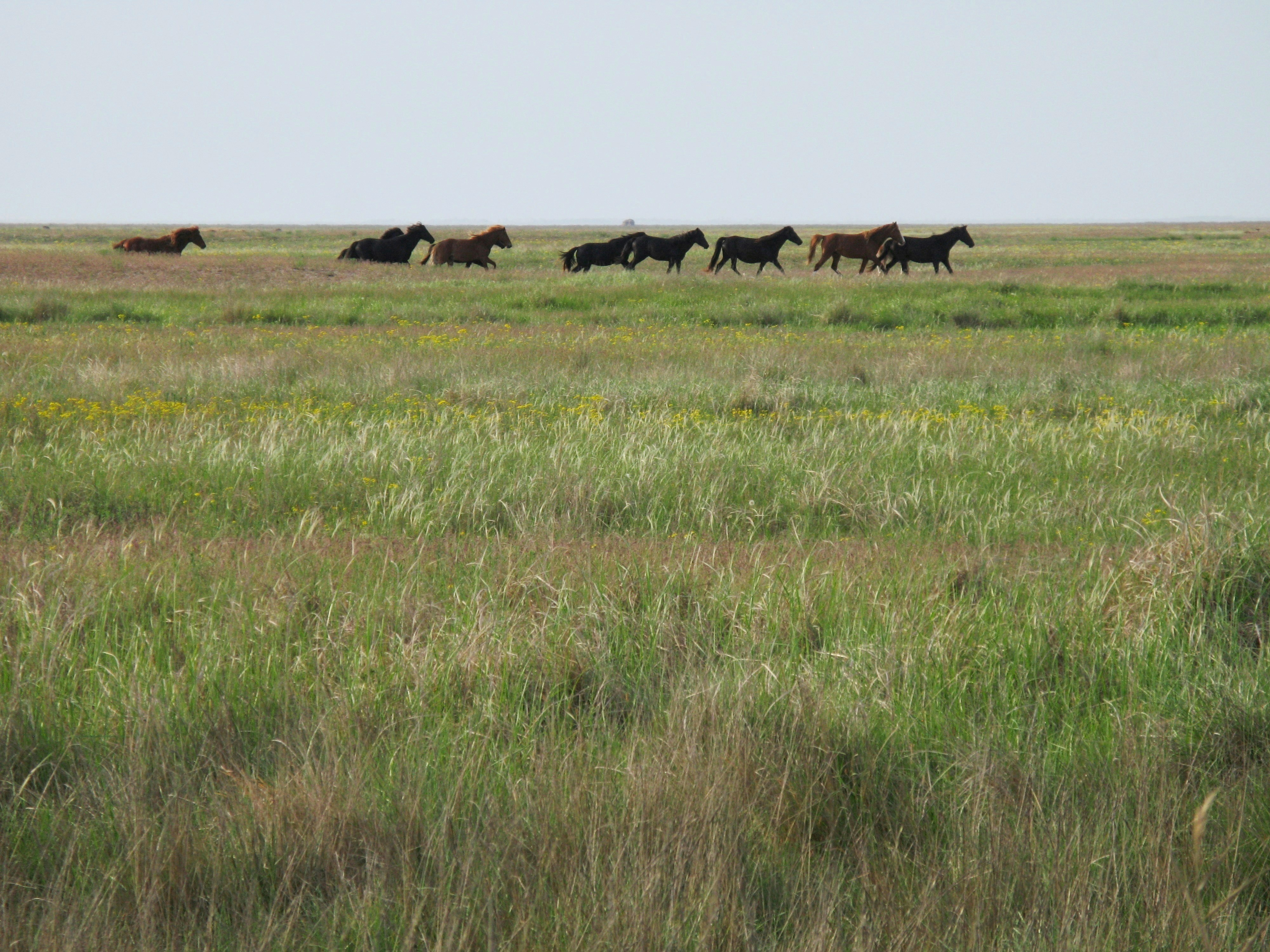
The Pontic–Caspian steppe in Henichesk, Ukraine.

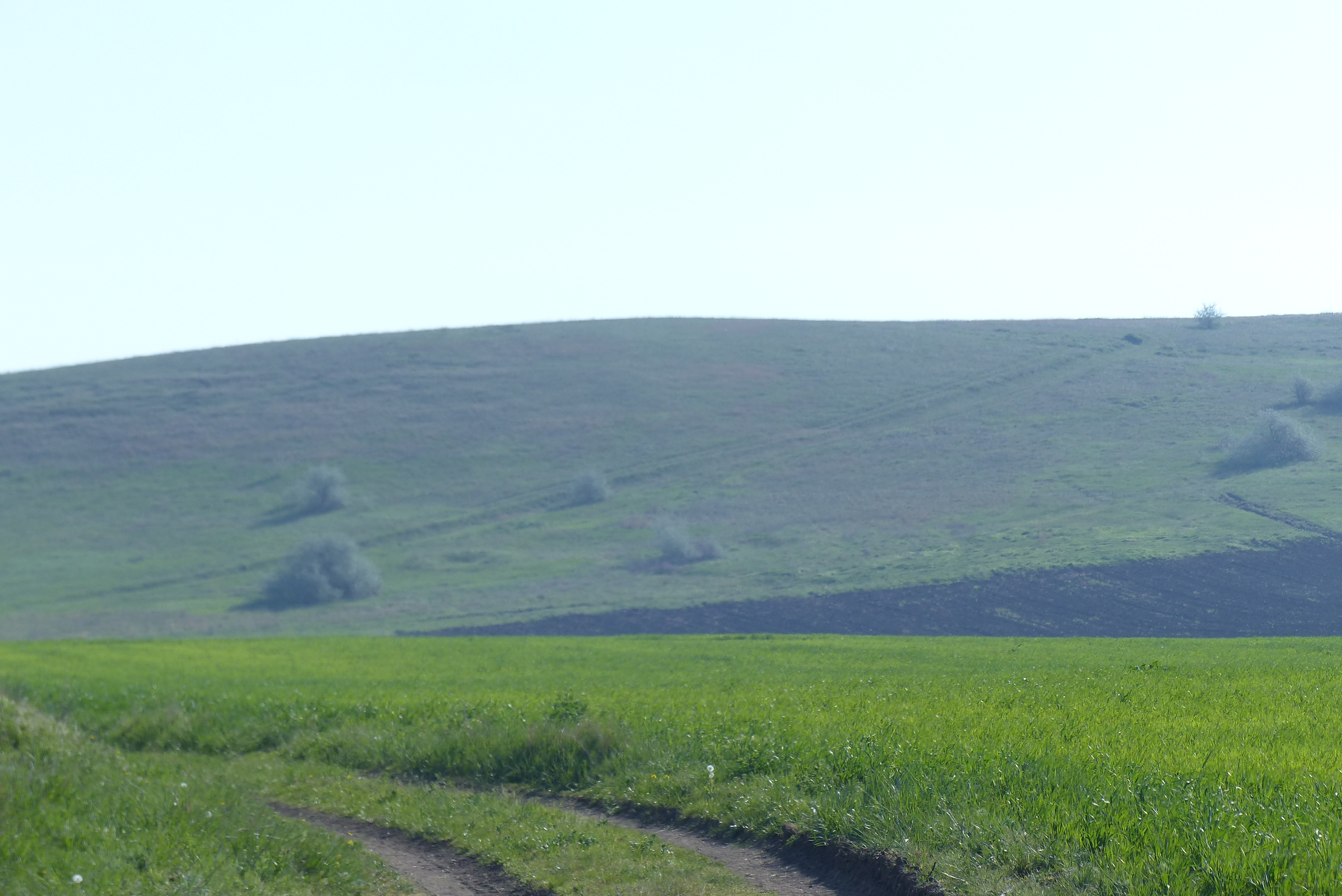
Steppes in Gagauzia, Moldova.

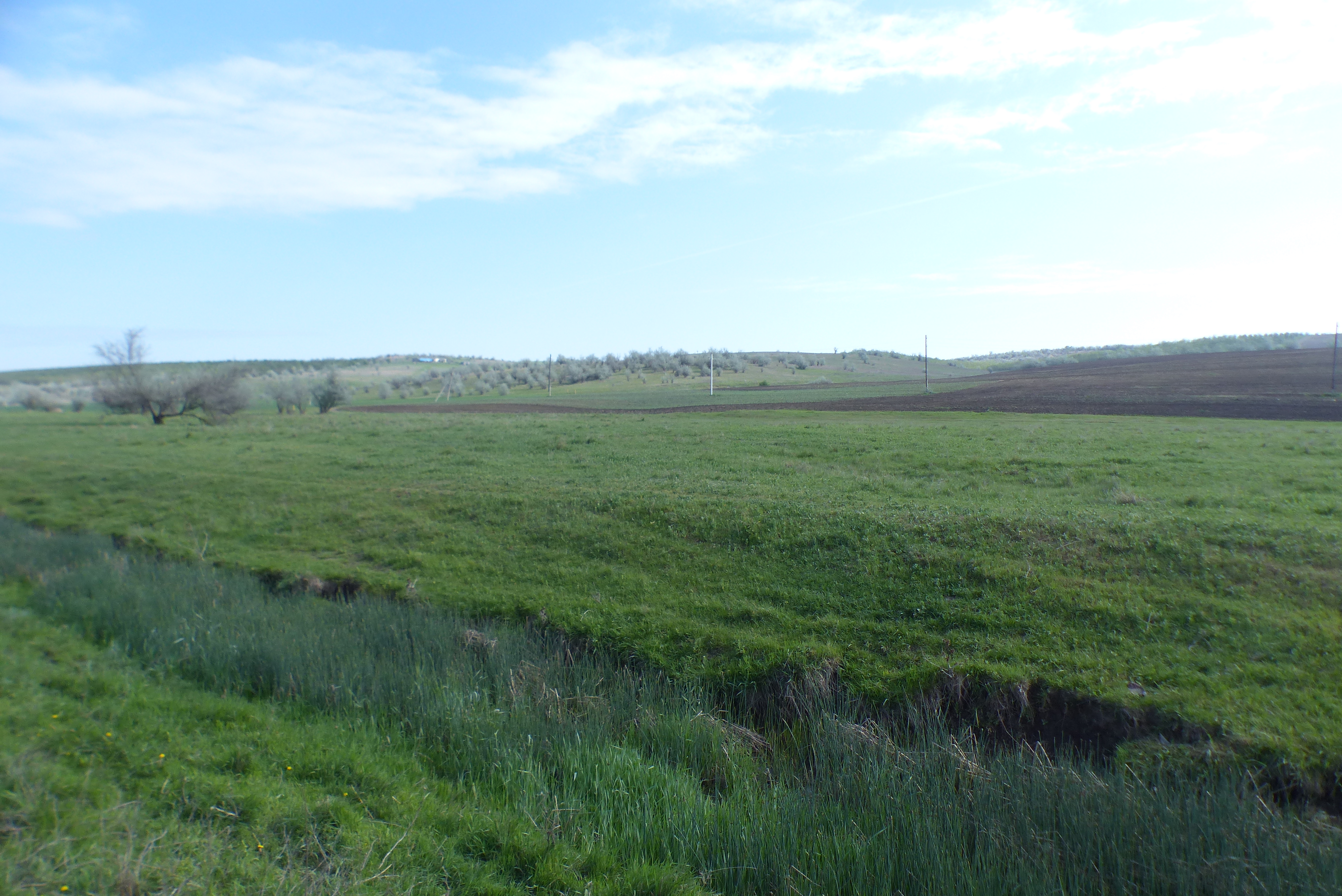
Steppes in Gagauzia, Dezghingea, Moldova.

=== Ural–Caspian Narrowing ===
The steppe narrows around the southern end of the Ural Mountains, about 650 km (400 mi) northeast of the Caspian Sea, forming the Ural-Caspian Narrowing, that joins the Pontic-Caspian Steppe in Europe with the Kazakh Steppe in Central Asia.

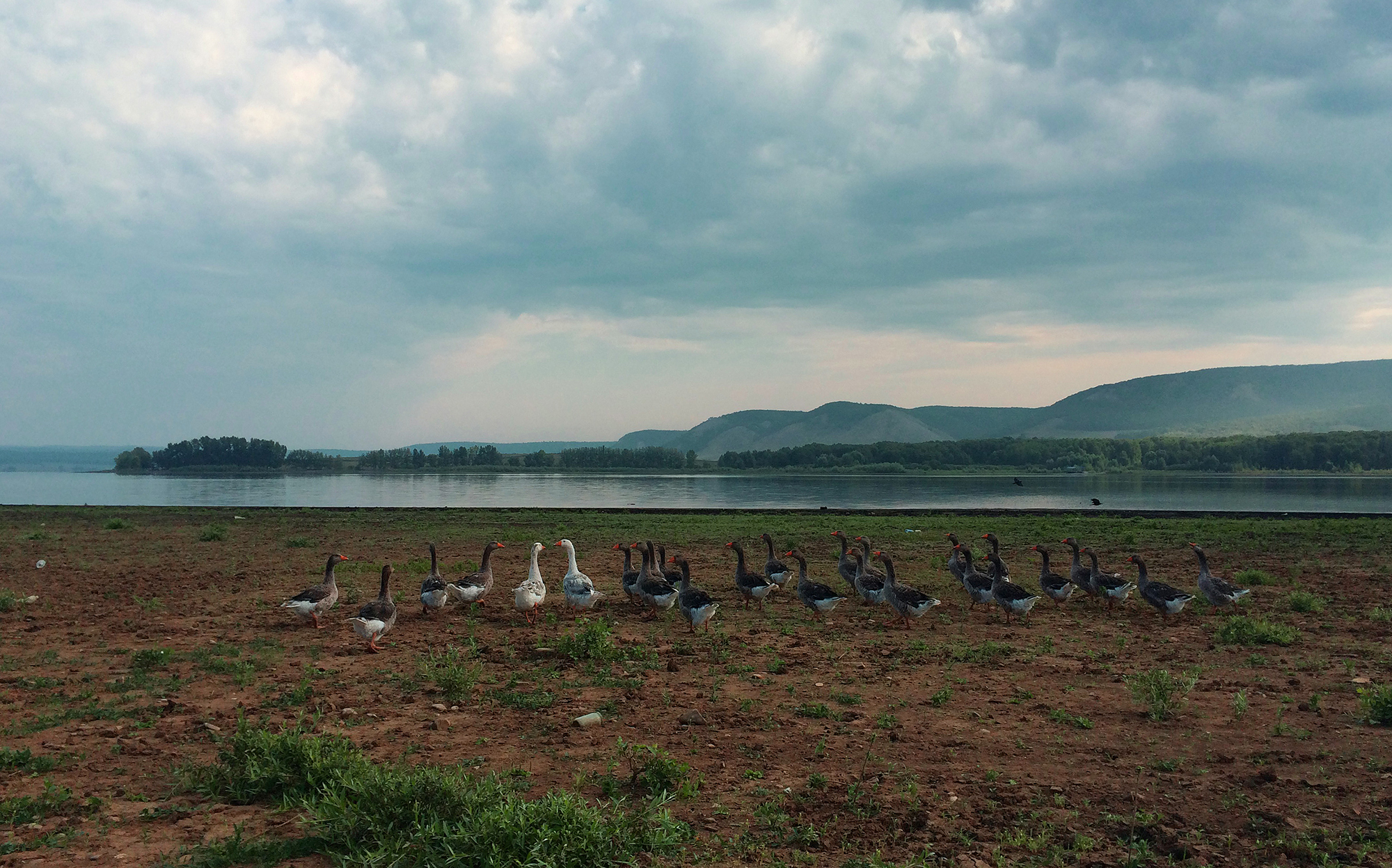
Bashkiriya National Park, southern end of the Ural Mountains, Russia

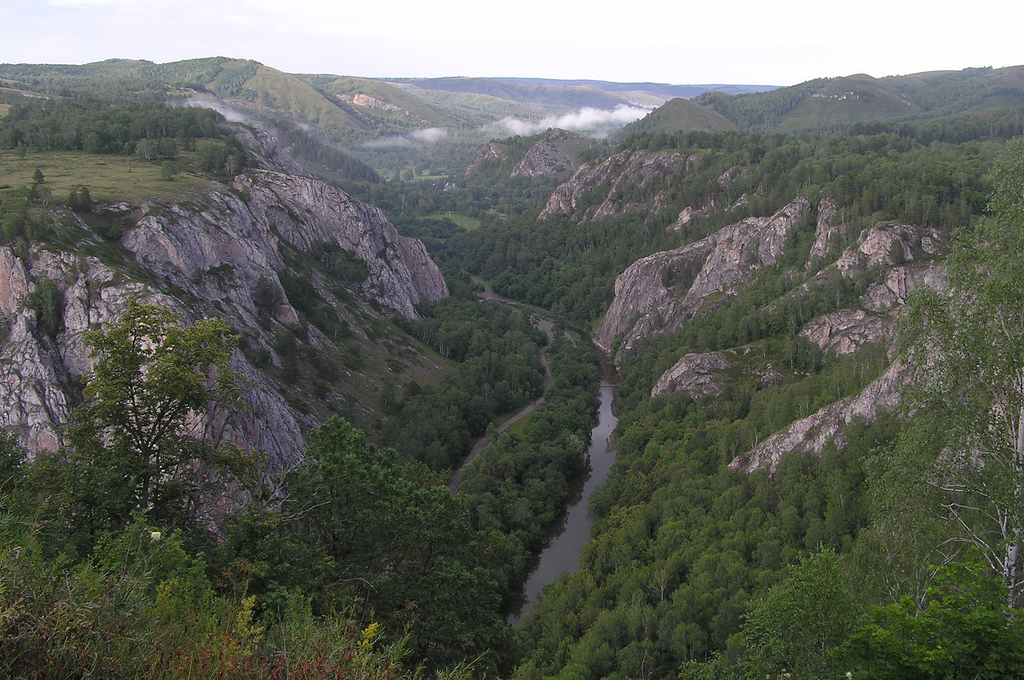
Bashkiriya National Park, Ural Mountains, Russia

=== Kazakh Steppe ===
The Kazakh Steppe makes up most of the Eurasian Steppe in Central Asia. It extends from the Urals to Dzungaria. To the south, it grades off into semi-desert and desert which is interrupted by two great rivers, the Amu Darya (Oxus) and Syr Darya (Jaxartes), which flow northwest into the Aral Sea and provide irrigation for agriculture. In the southeast is the densely populated Fergana Valley and west of it the great oasis cities of Tashkent, Samarkand and Bukhara along the Zeravshan River. The southern area has a complex history (see Central Asia and Greater Iran), while in the north, the Kazakh Steppe proper was relatively isolated from the main currents of written history.

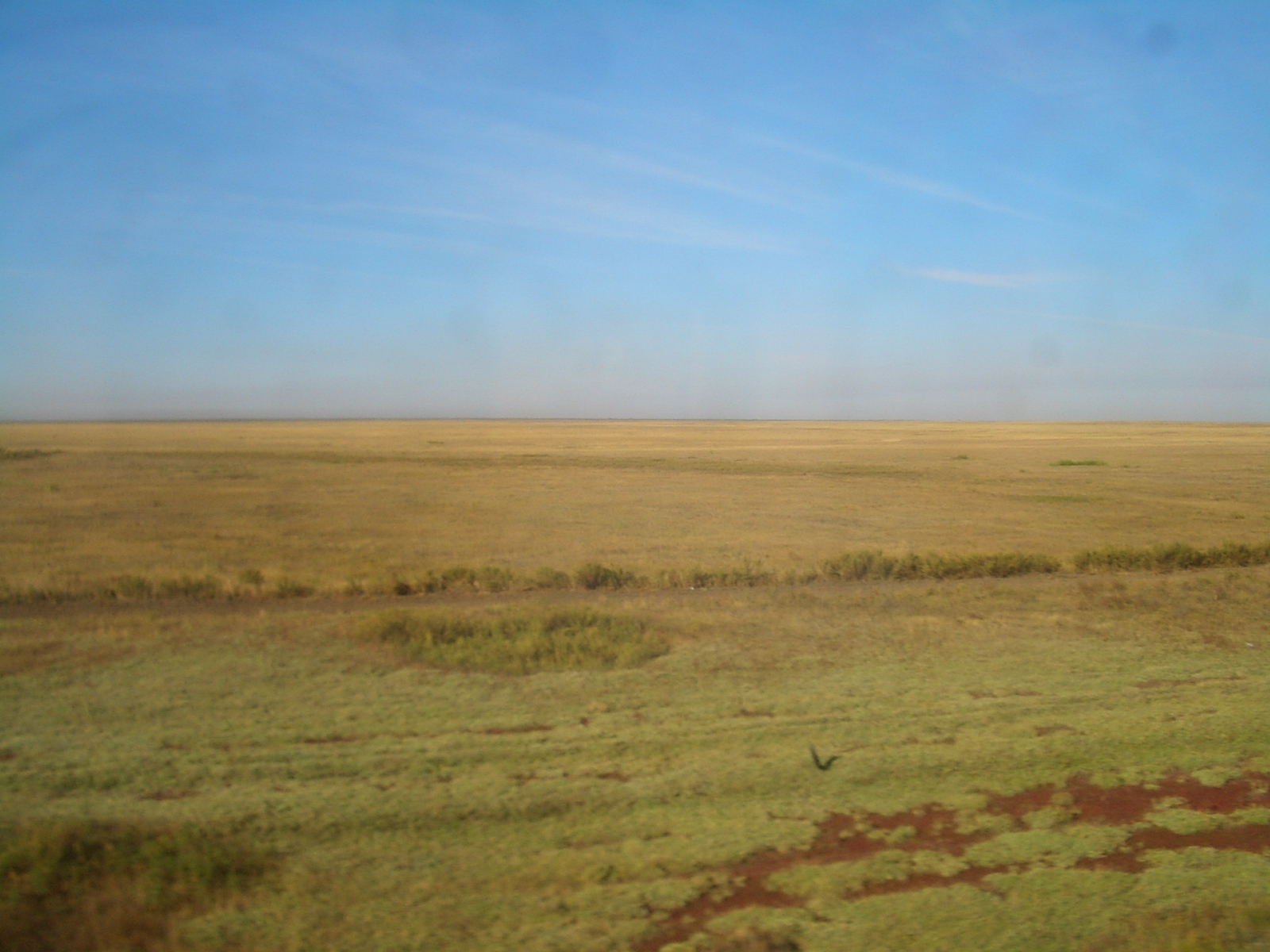
The steppe in Akmola Region, Kazakhstan.

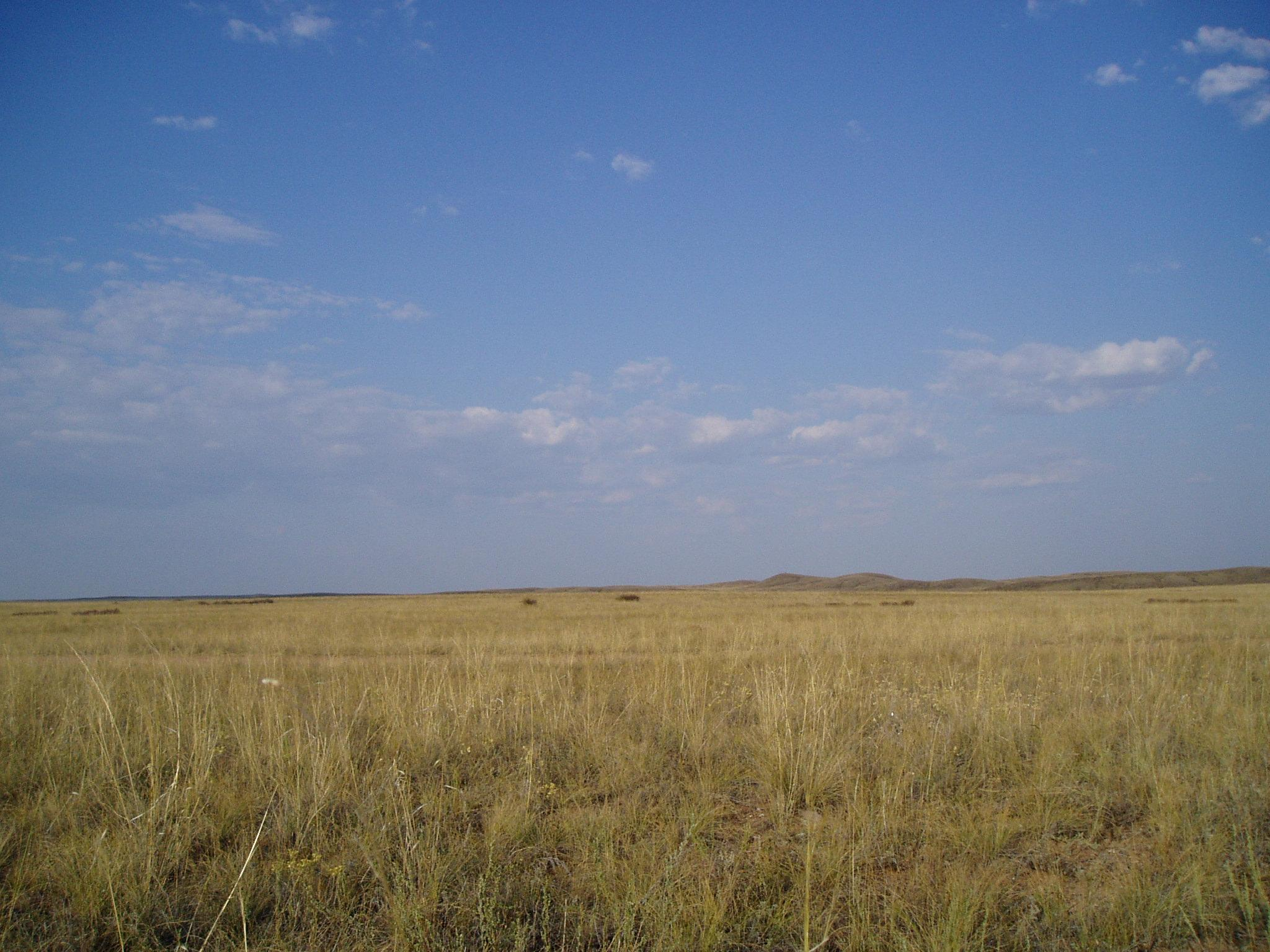
The steppes in Akmola Province, Kazakhstan.

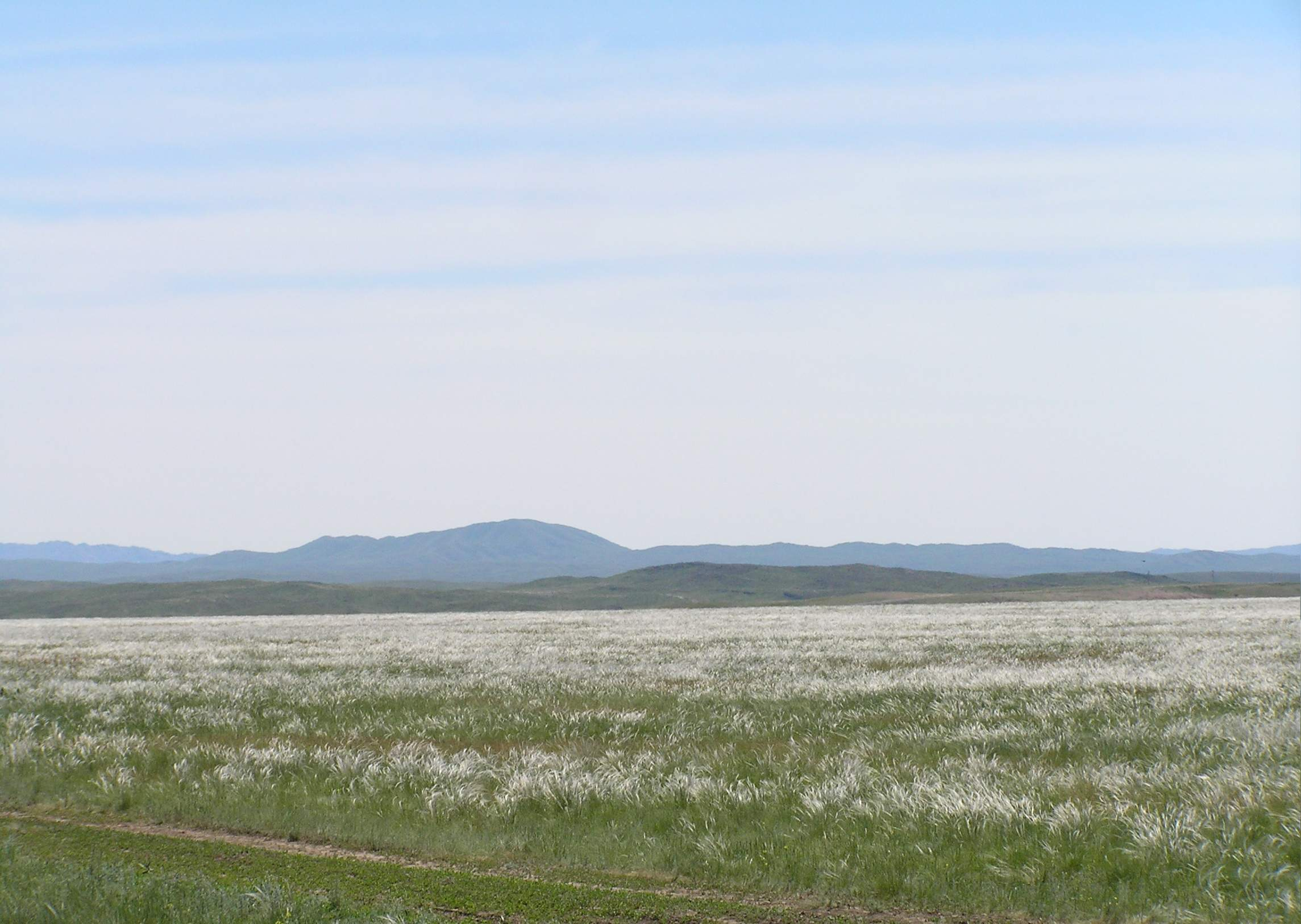
The Kazakh Steppe in the Ayagoz District, Kazakhstan.

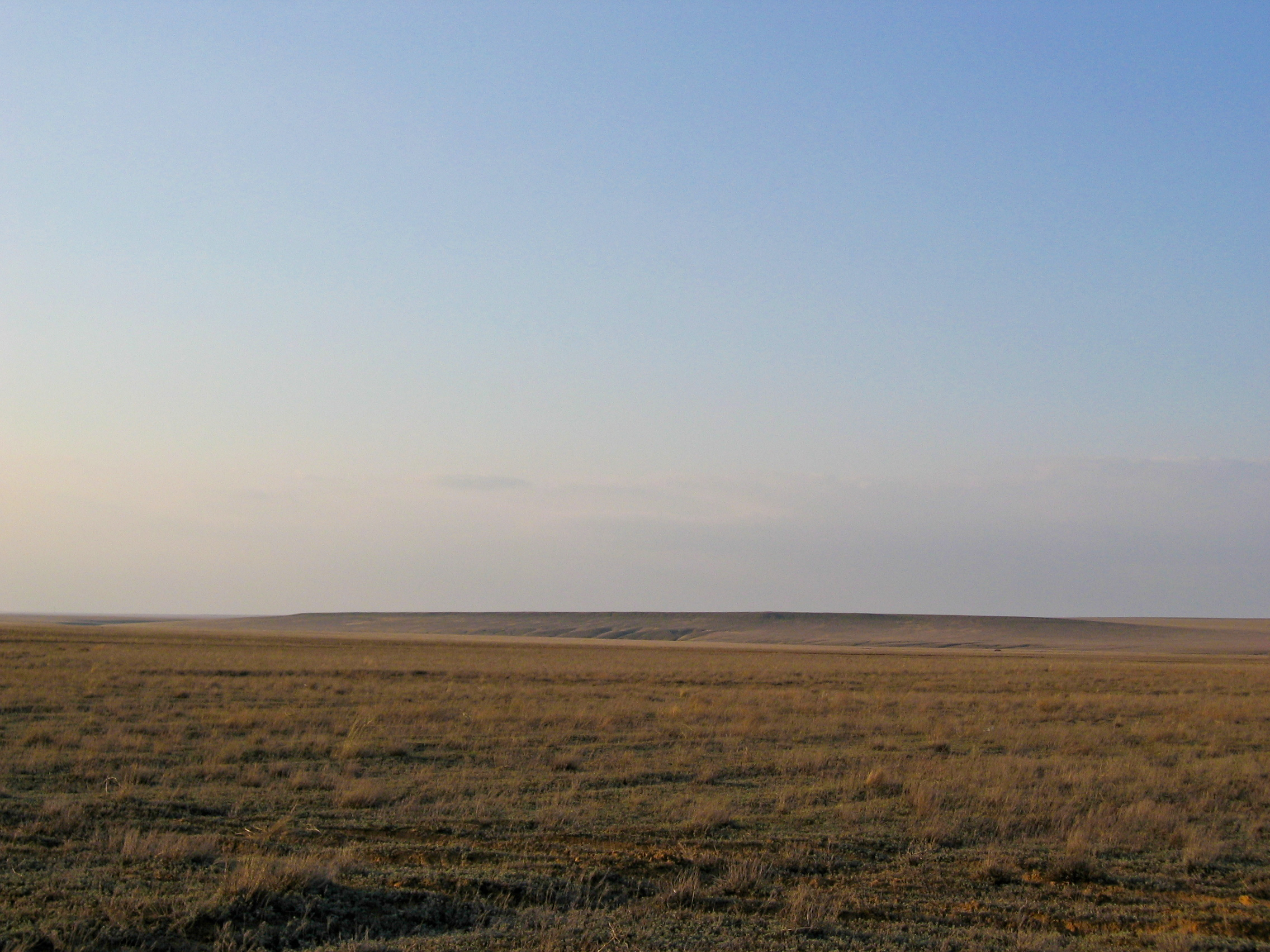
The Kazakh Steppe in the early spring.

=== Dzungarian Narrowing ===
Along the former Sino-Soviet border, mountains extend north almost to the forest zone, separating the Central Steppe from the Eastern Steppe, leaving only limited grassland in Dzungaria. This discontinuous section of the Eurasian steppe connects the great steppes of Central Asia and East Asia.

The east-west Tian Shan Mountains divide the steppe into Dzungaria in the north and the Tarim Basin to the south. Dzungaria is bounded by the Tarbagatai Mountains on the west and the Mongolian Altai Mountains on the east, neither of which is a significant barrier. Dzungaria has good grassland around the edges and a central desert. It often behaved as a westward extension of Mongolia and connected Mongolia to the Kazakh Steppe. To the north of Dzungaria are mountains and the Siberian forest. To the south and west of Dzungaria, and separated from it by the Tian Shan mountains, is an area about twice the size of Dzungaria, the oval Tarim Basin. The Tarim Basin's arid conditions make it unsuitable for sustaining a nomadic population. However, along its periphery, rivers descend from the mountains, creating a circle of cities that thrived on irrigation agriculture and engaged in east-west trade. The Tarim Basin formed an island of near civilization in the center of the steppe. The Northern Silk Road went along the north and south sides of the Tarim Basin and then crossed the mountains west to the Fergana Valley. At the west end of the basin the Pamir Mountains connect the Tian Shan Mountains to the Himalayas. To the south, the Kunlun Mountains separate the Tarim Basin from the thinly peopled Tibetan Plateau.

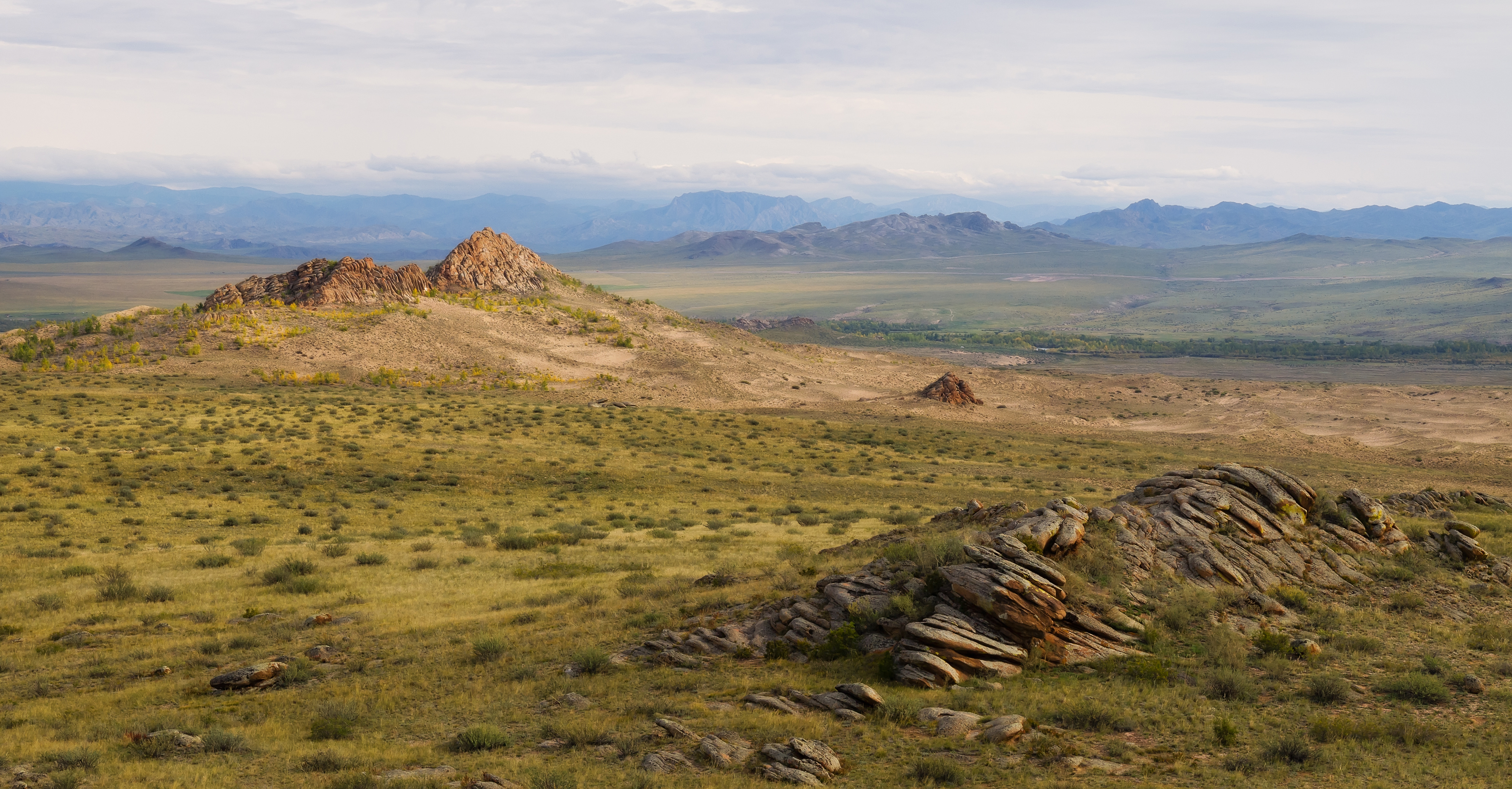
Uvs Lake Basin, Tuva Republic, Russia.

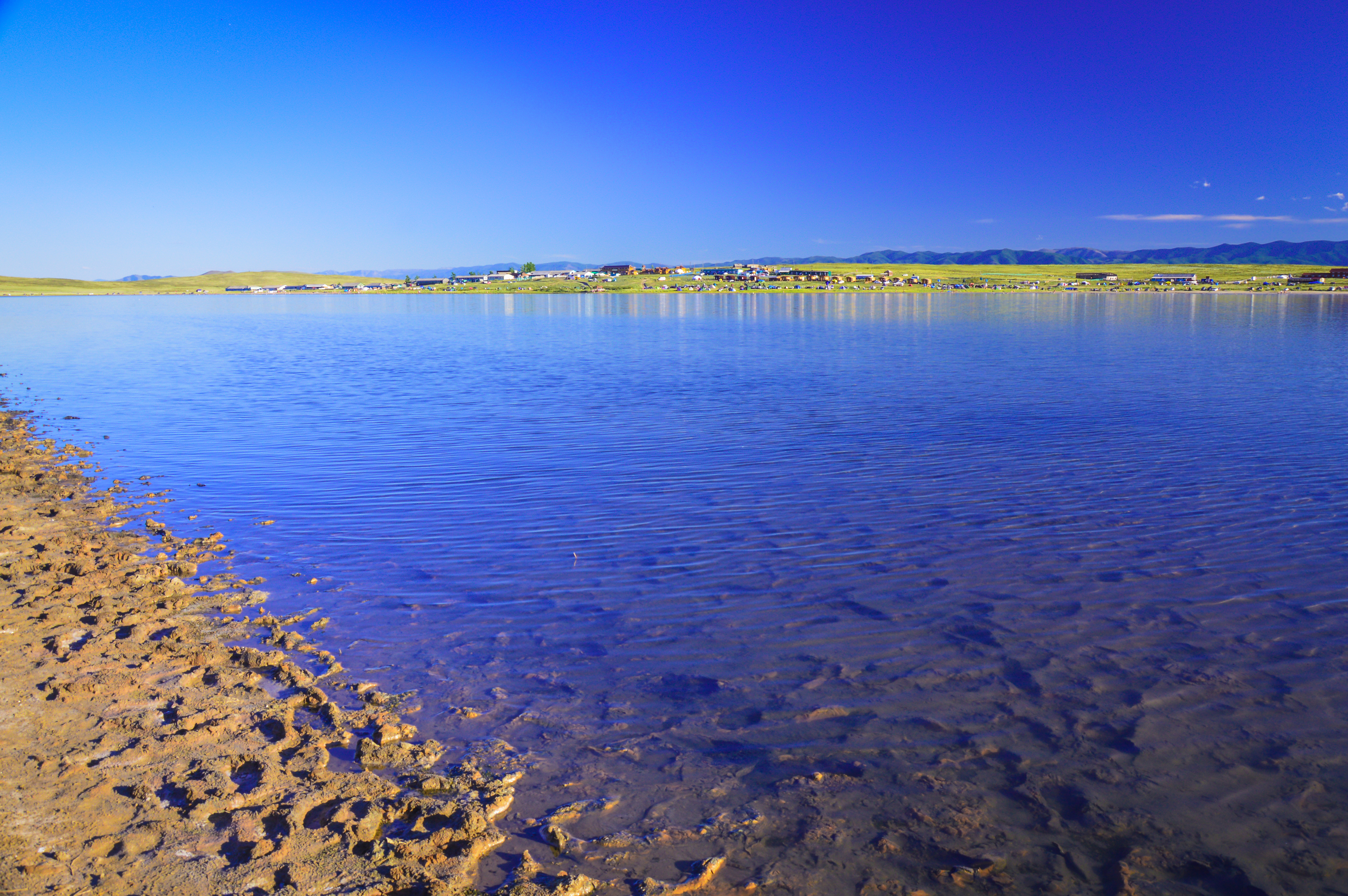
Dus-Khol lake, Russia.

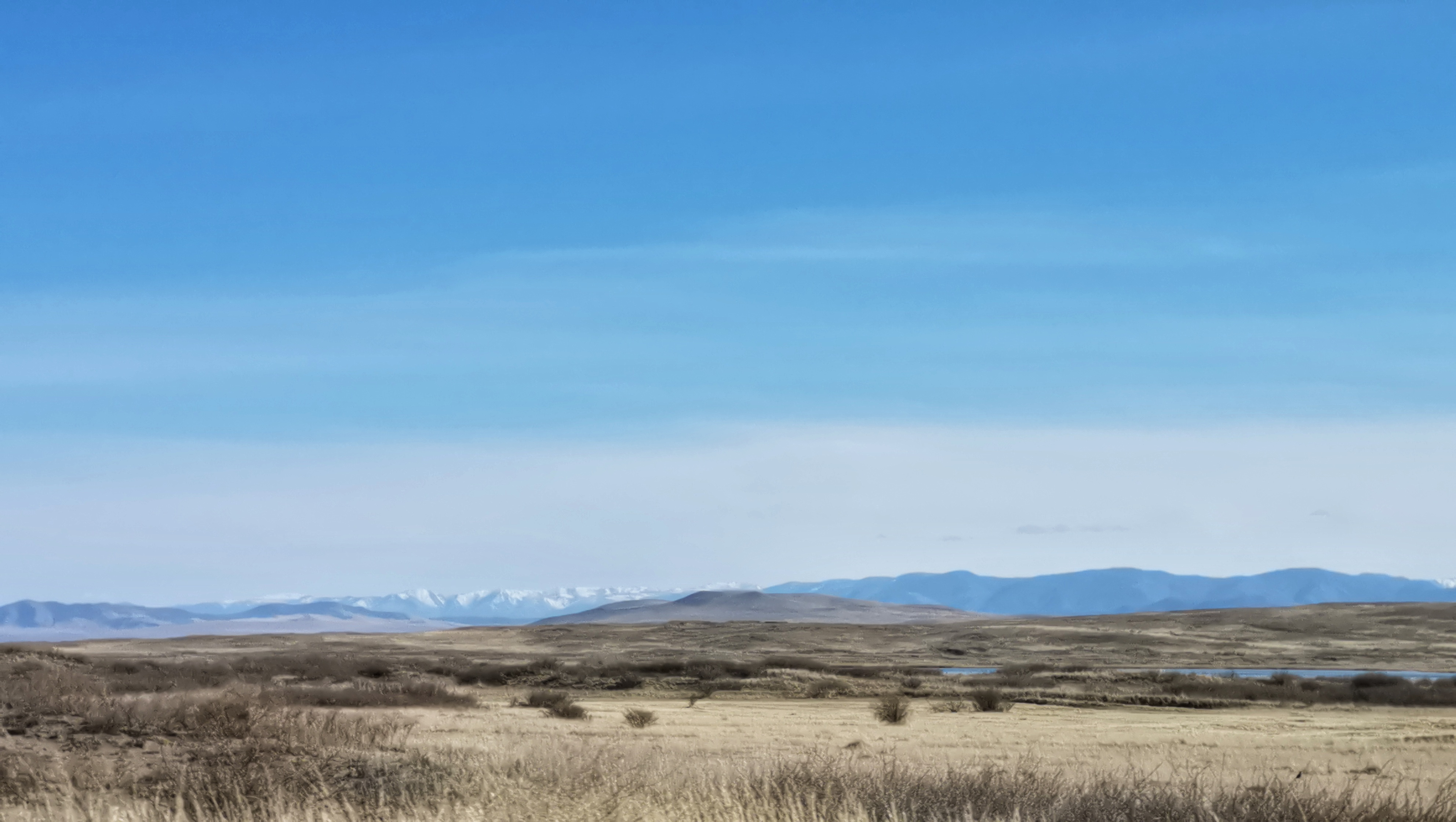
The grassland in Tuva Republic, Russia.

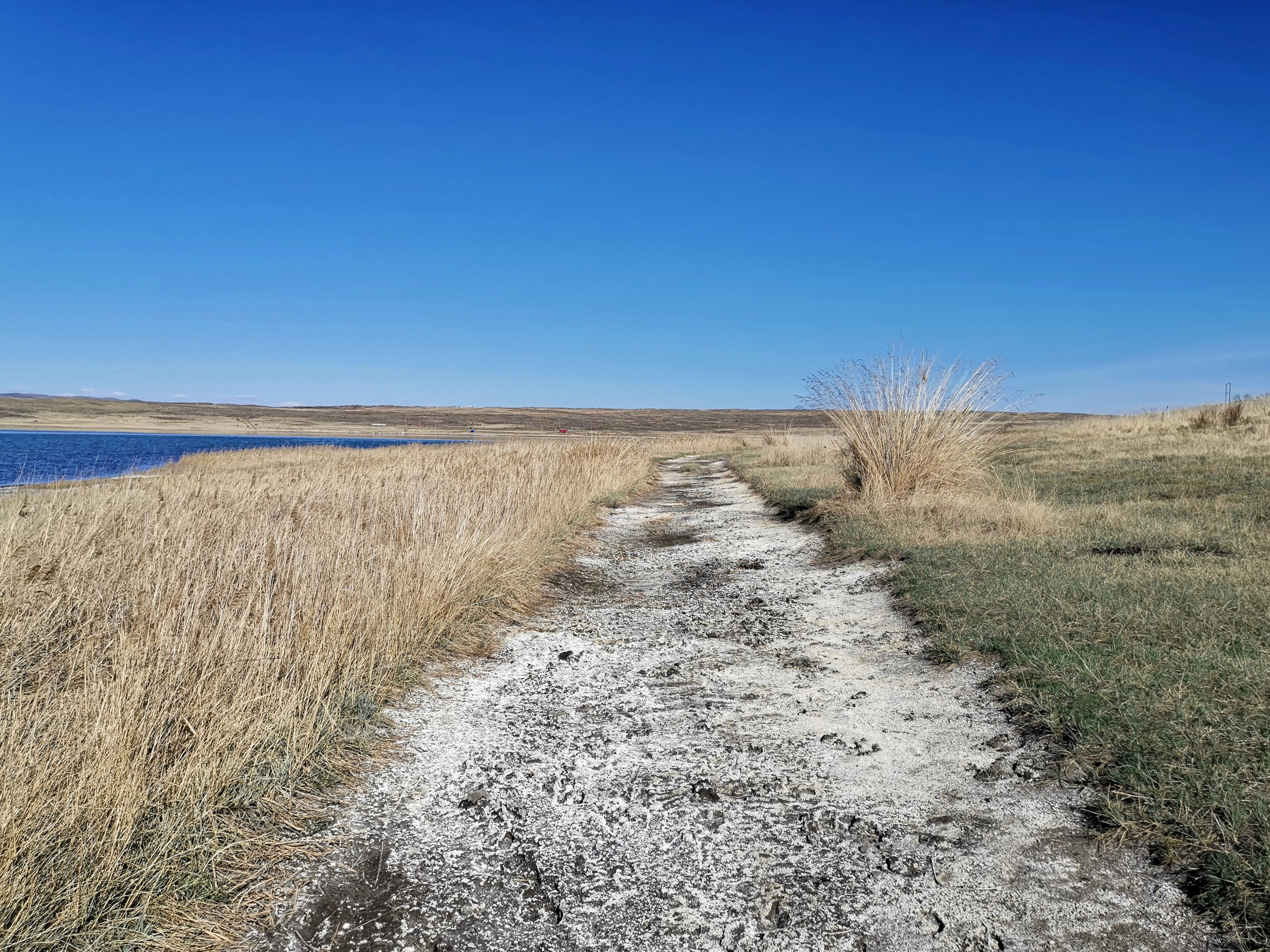
Dus-Khol lake, Tandinsky District, Tuva Republic, Russia.

=== Mongolian-Manchurian Steppe ===
The Mongolian-Manchurian Steppe is the main part of the Eurasian Steppe in East Asia. It covers large parts of Mongolia and the Chinese province of Inner Mongolia. The two are separated by a relatively dry area marked by the Gobi Desert. South of the Mongol Steppe is the high and thinly peopled Tibetan Plateau. The northern edge of the plateau is the Gansu or Hexi Corridor, a belt of moderately dense population that connects China proper with the Tarim Basin. The Hexi Corridor was the main route of the Silk Road. In the southeast the Silk Road led over some hills to the east-flowing Wei River valley which led to the North China Plain.

South of the Khingan Mountains and north of the Taihang Mountains, the Mongolian-Manchurian steppe extends east into Manchuria as the Liao Xi steppe. In Manchuria, the steppe grades off into forest and mountains without reaching the Pacific. The central area of forest-steppe was inhabited by pastoral and agricultural peoples, while to the north and east was a thin population of hunting tribes of the Siberian type.

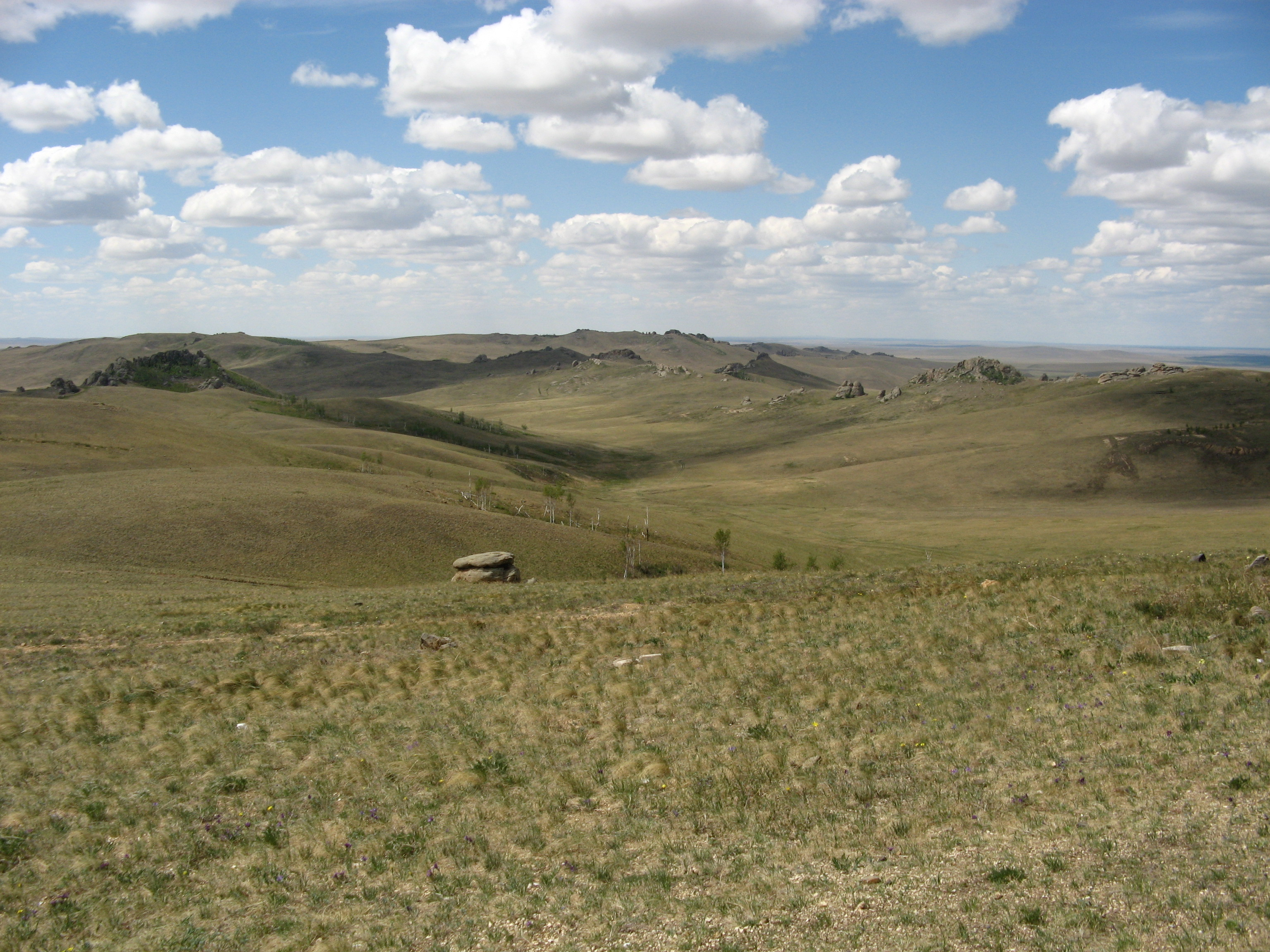
The Daurian forest steppe

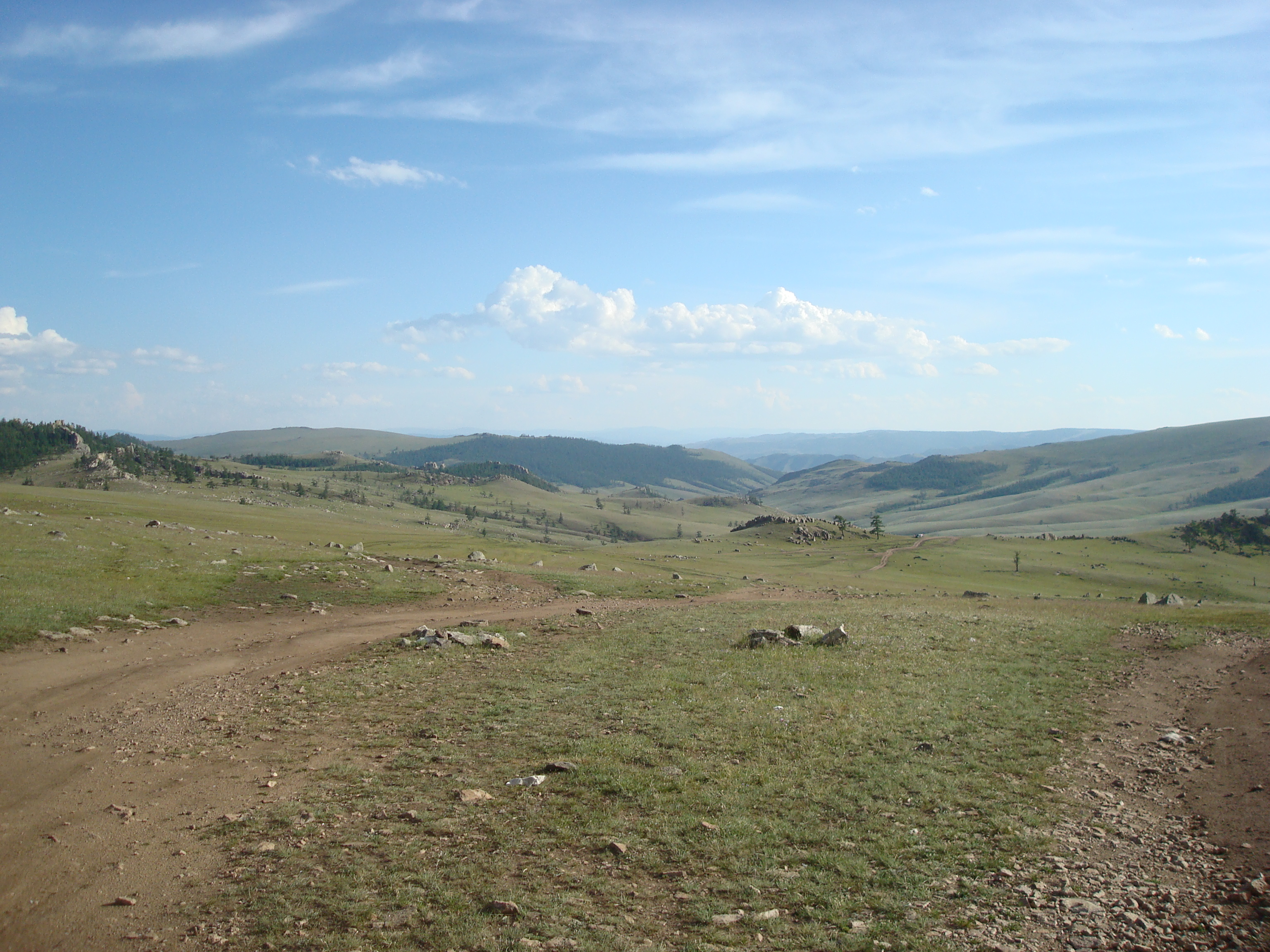
The Mongolian-Manchurian grassland in the Khövsgöl Province, Mongolia.

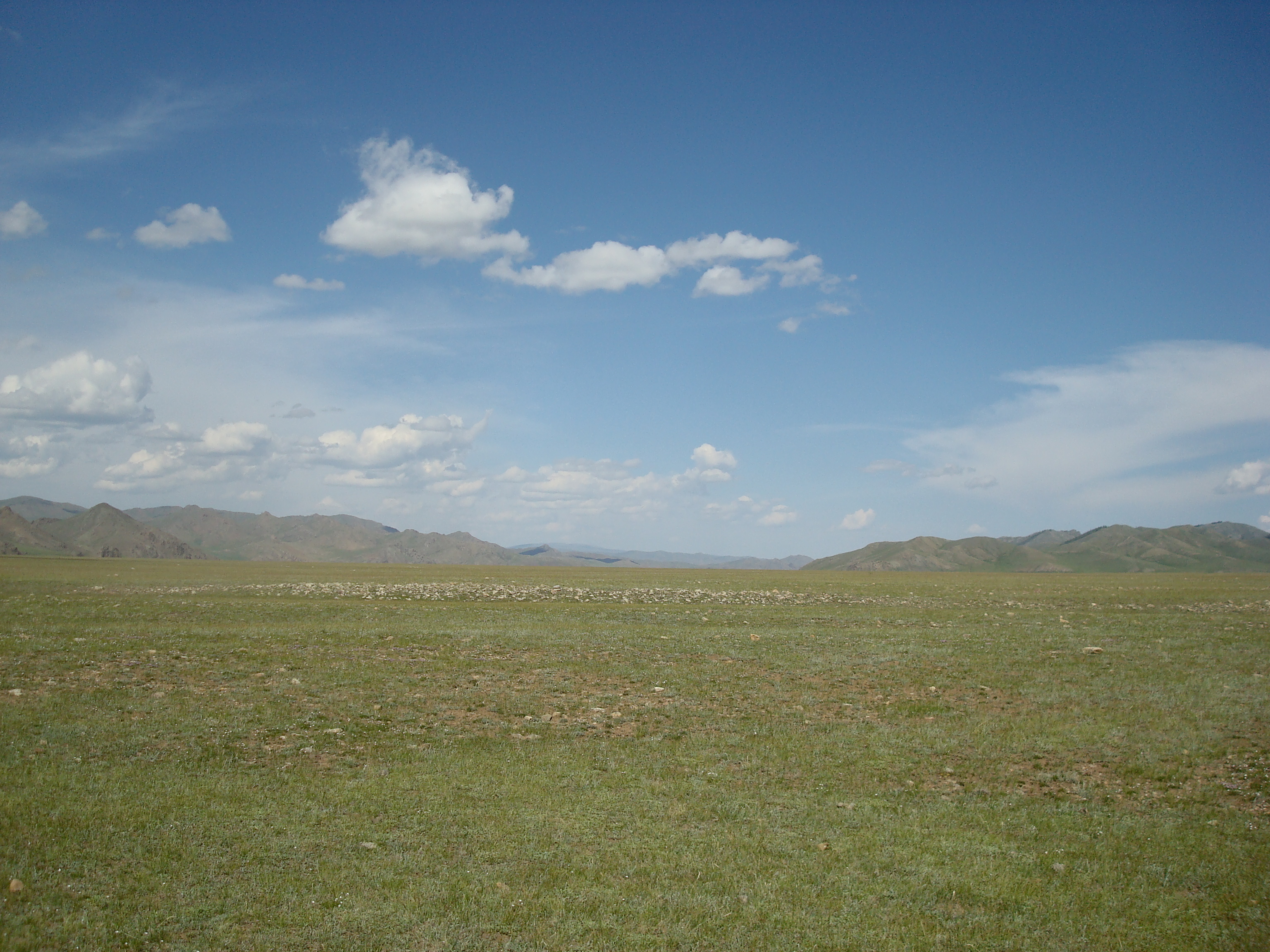
Grass steppe in the Khövsgöl Province, Mongolia.

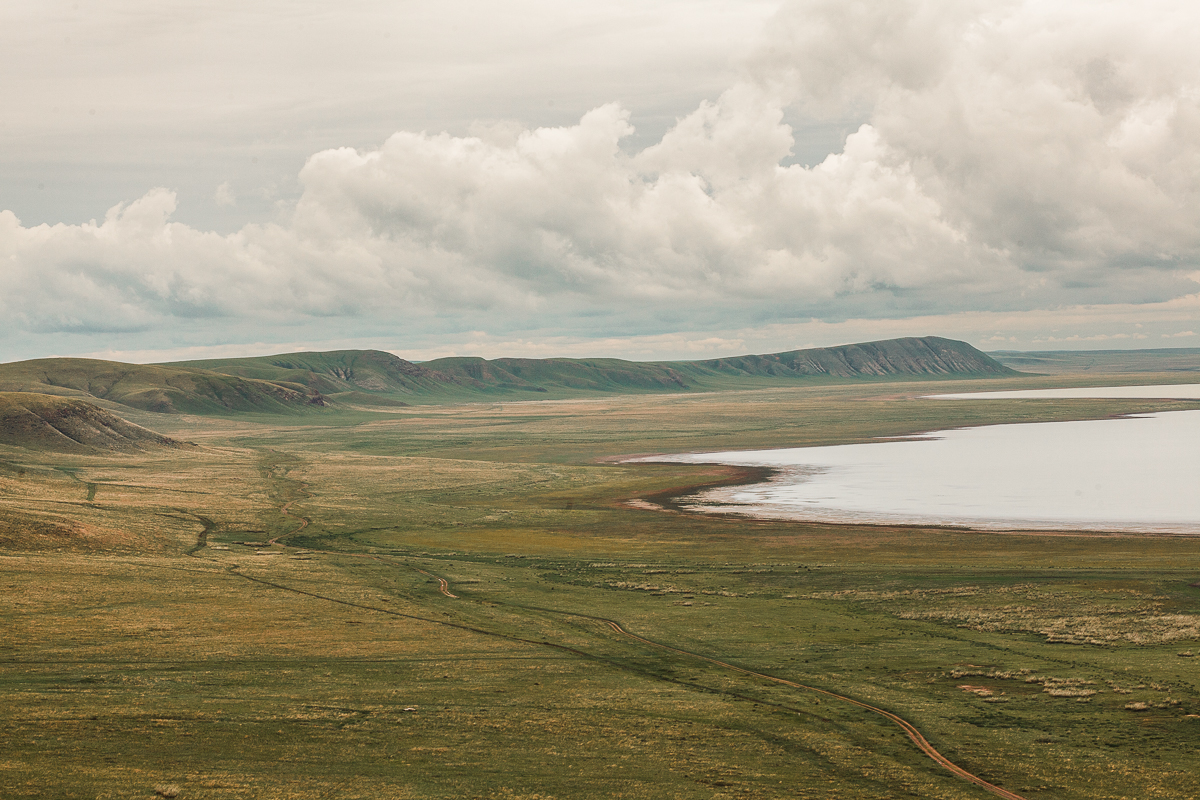
Daursky Nature Reserve in the southern part of the Zabaykalsky Krai in Siberia, Russia, close to the border with Mongolia.

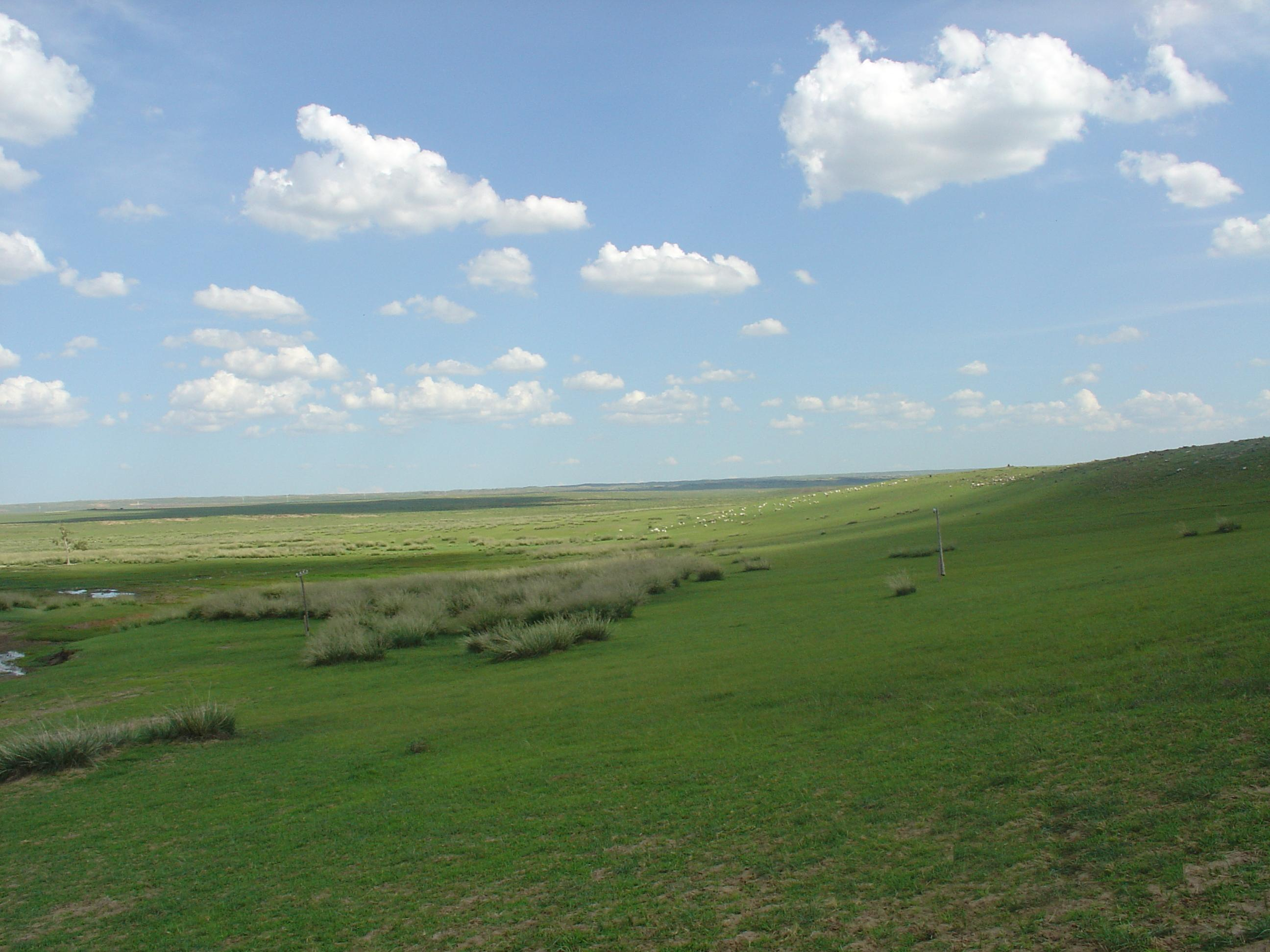
The Mongolian-Manchurian grassland in Inner Mongolia, China.

=== Fauna ===
Big mammals of the Eurasian steppe include Przewalski's horse, the saiga antelope, the Mongolian gazelle, the goitered gazelle, the wild Bactrian camel and the onager. The gray wolf, corsac fox, Pallas's cat and occasionally the brown bear are predators roaming the steppe. Smaller mammal species are the Mongolian gerbil, the little souslik and the bobak marmot.

Furthermore, the Eurasian steppe is home to a great variety of bird species. Threatened bird species living there are for example the imperial eagle, the lesser kestrel, the great bustard, the pale-back pigeon and the white-throated bushchat.

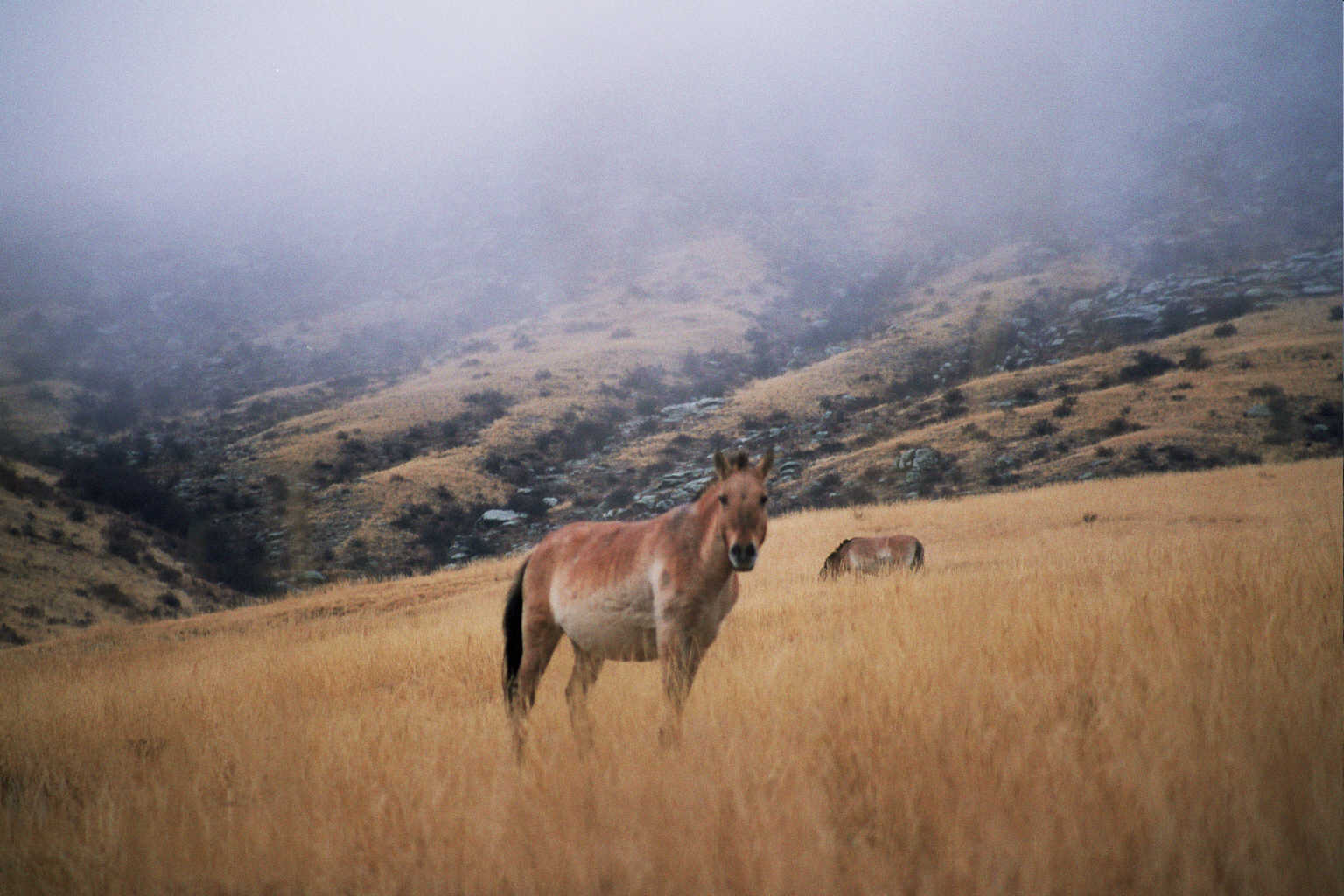
Przewalski horse

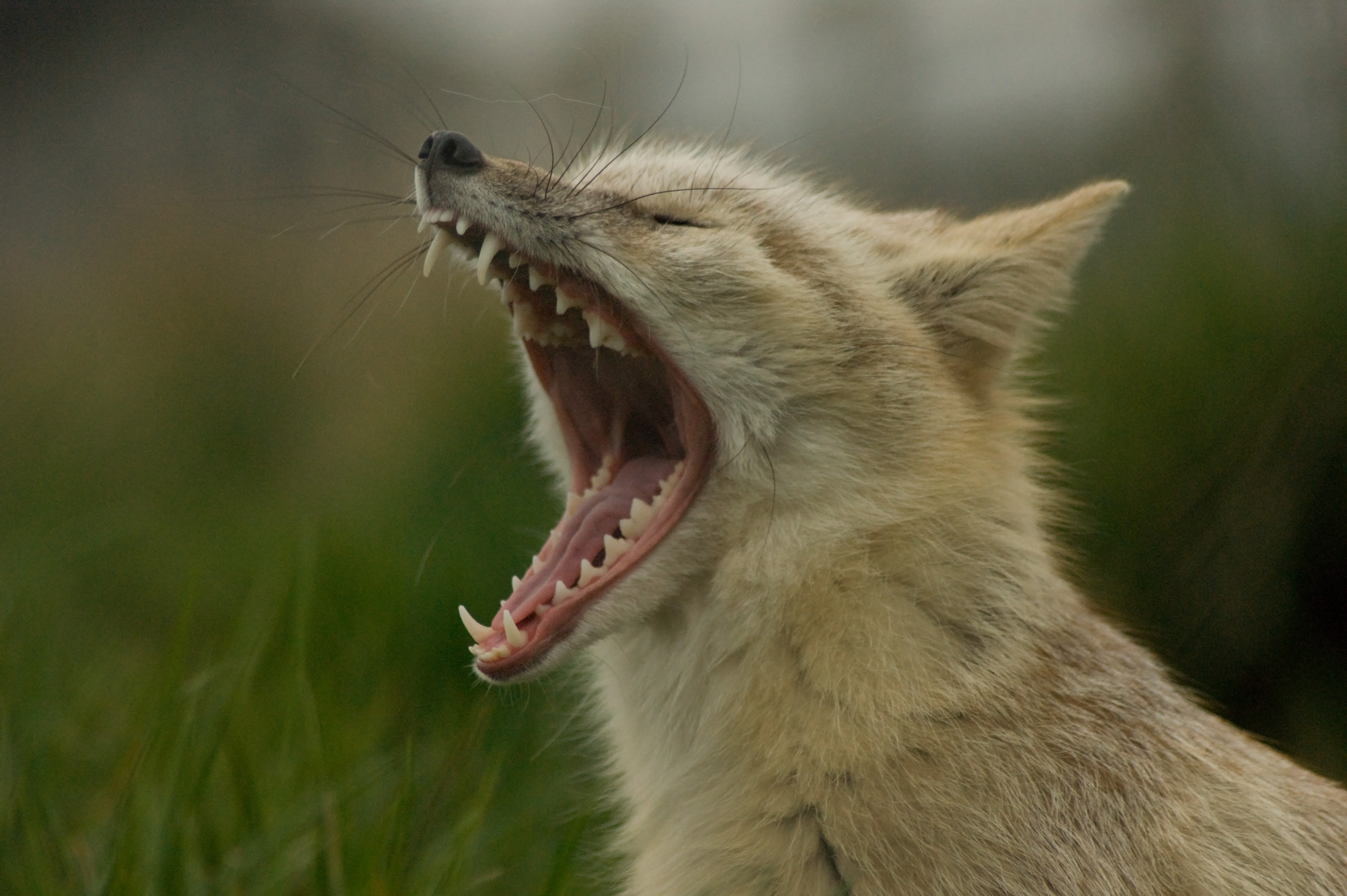
Corsac fox

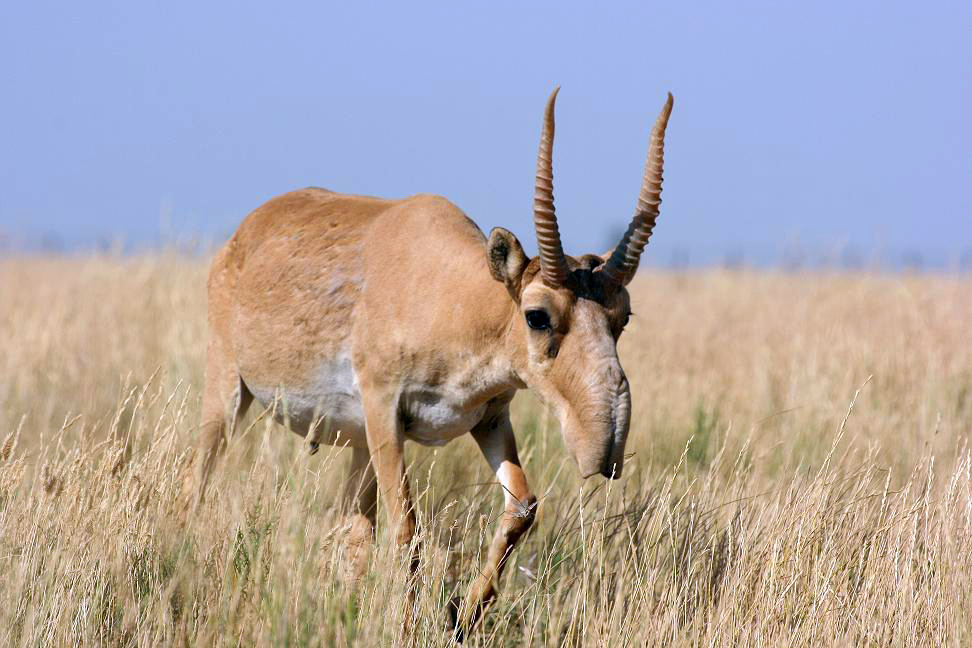
Saiga antelope

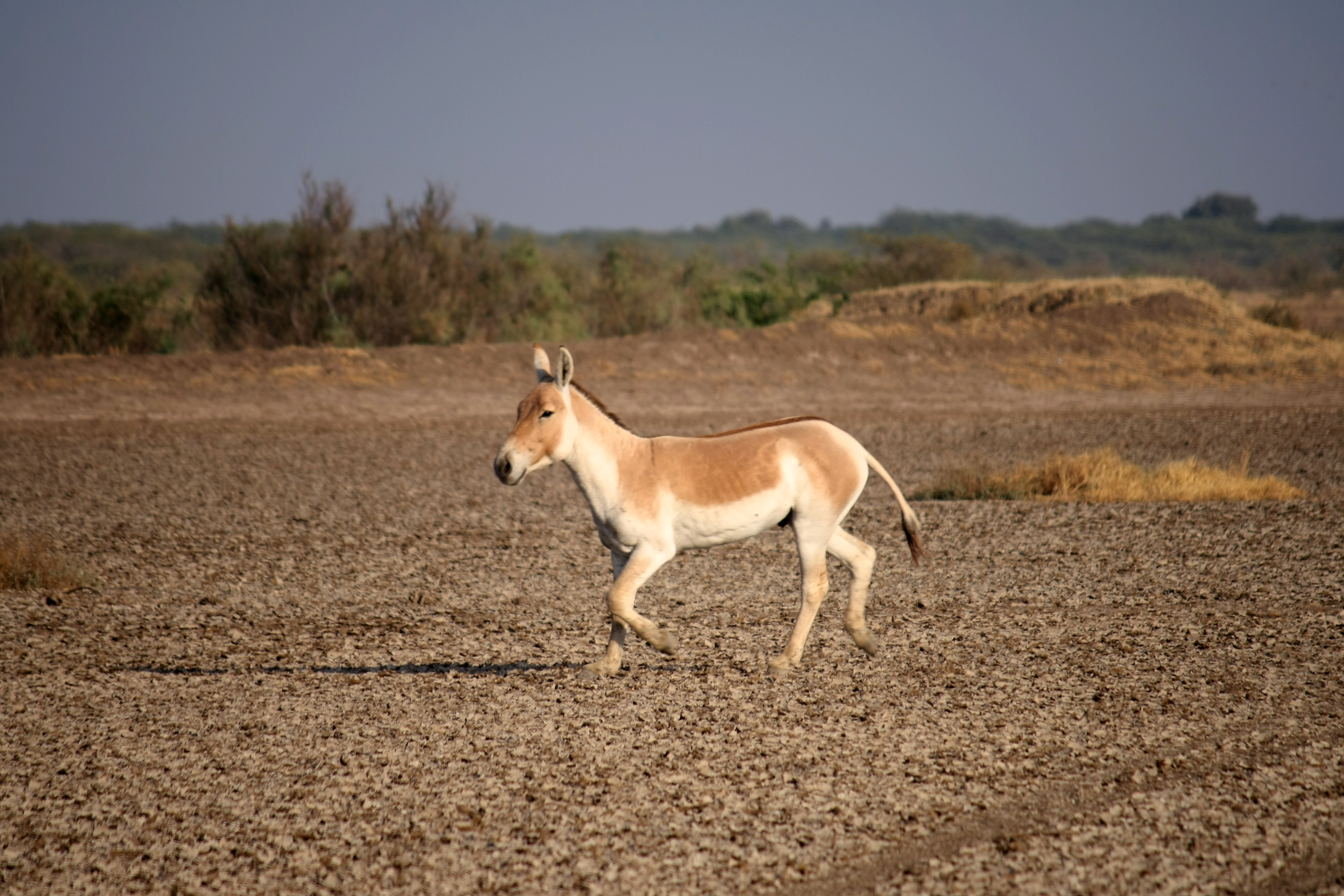
Onager

The primary domesticated animals raised were sheep and goats with fewer cattle than one might expect. Camels were used in the drier areas for transport as far west as Astrakhan. There were some yaks along the edge of Tibet. The horse was used for transportation and warfare. The horse was first domesticated on the Pontic–Caspian or Kazakh steppe sometime before 3000 BC, but it took a long time for mounted archery to develop and the process is not fully understood. The stirrup does not seem to have been completely developed until 300 AD (see Stirrup, Saddle, Composite bow, Domestication of the horse and related articles).

=== Flora ===
The steppe is dominated by shrubs and grasses, with only a small amount of trees. The grass communities are primarily C3 and C4 grasses. Common genera include Stipa and Festuca. Grasses from the Stipa genus include needlegrass (Stipa krylovii), Stipa korshinskyi, and lessing feather grass (Stipa lessingiana). In addition to grasses, two species of sagebrush or wormwood, Artemisia austriaca and Artemisia nitrosa, are commonly found throughout the steppe.

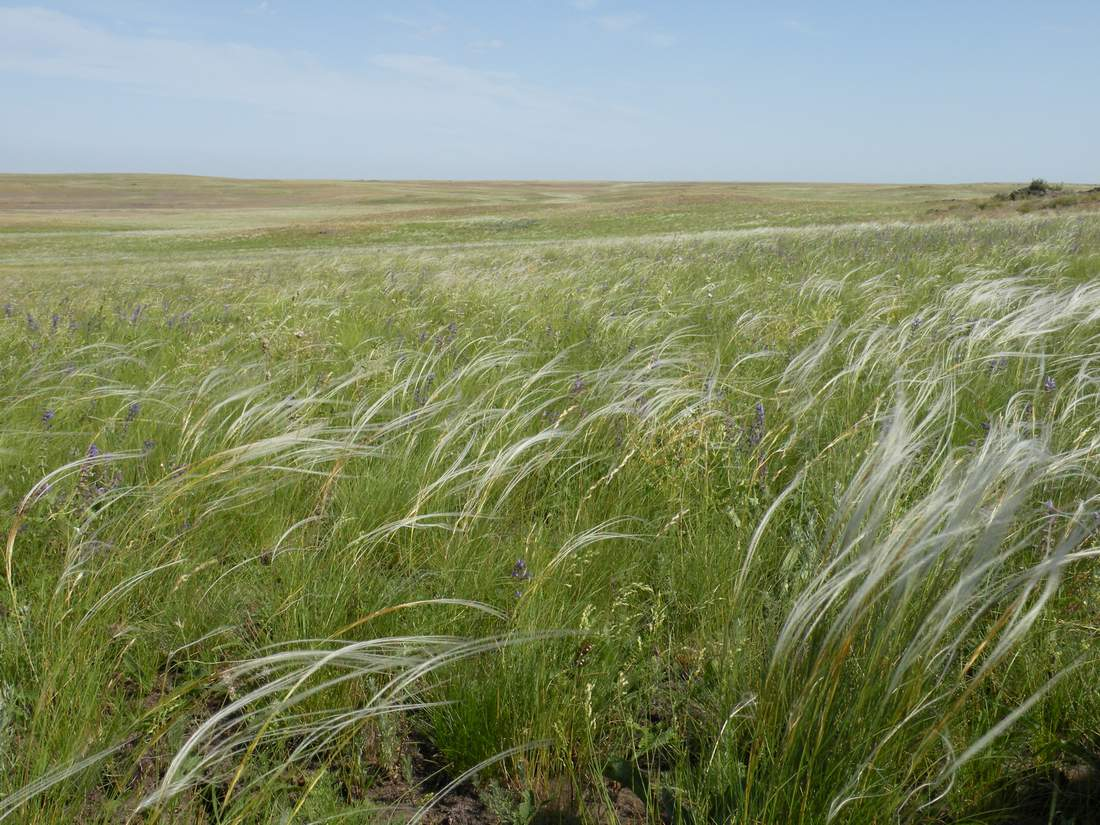
Stipa zalesskii

=== Ecological processes ===
Parts of the Eurasian steppe experience an ecological regime shift in form of woody plant encroachment, such as the Black Sea-Kazakhstan steppe, the Tibetan Plateau steppe, and the Central Asian steppe. This process involves the gradual increase of shrubs at the expense of grasses.

=== Ecoregions ===
The World Wide Fund for Nature divides the Eurasian steppe's temperate grasslands, savannas and shrublands into a number of ecoregions, distinguished by elevation, climate, rainfall, and other characteristics and home to distinct animal and plant communities and species and distinct habitat ecosystems.

- Alai–Western Tian Shan steppe (Kazakhstan, Turkmenistan, Uzbekistan)
- Altai steppe and semi-desert (Kazakhstan)
- Baraba steppe (Russia)
- Daurian forest steppe (China, Mongolia, Russia)
- Gissaro-Alai open woodlands (Kazakhstan, Kyrgyzstan, Tajikistan, Uzbekistan, Afghanistan)
- Emin Valley steppe (China, Kazakhstan)
- East European forest steppe (Moldova, Romania, Moldova, Russia, Ukraine, Bulgaria)
- Kazakh forest steppe (Kazakhstan, Russia)
- Kazakh Steppe (Kazakhstan, Russia)
- Kazakh Uplands (Kazakhstan)
- Mongolian-Manchurian grassland (China, Mongolia, Russia)
- Pontic–Caspian steppe (Moldova, Romania, Russia, Ukraine)
- Sayan Intermontane steppe (Russia)
- Selenge–Orkhon forest steppe (Mongolia, Russia)
- South Siberian forest steppe (Russia)
- Tian Shan foothill arid steppe (China, Kazakhstan, Kyrgyzstan)
- Pannonian Steppe (Hungary, Romania, Serbia, Croatia, Slovakia, Austria, Slovenia)

== Human activities ==
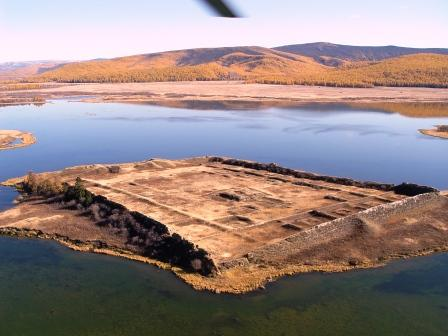
The site of Por-Bazhyn

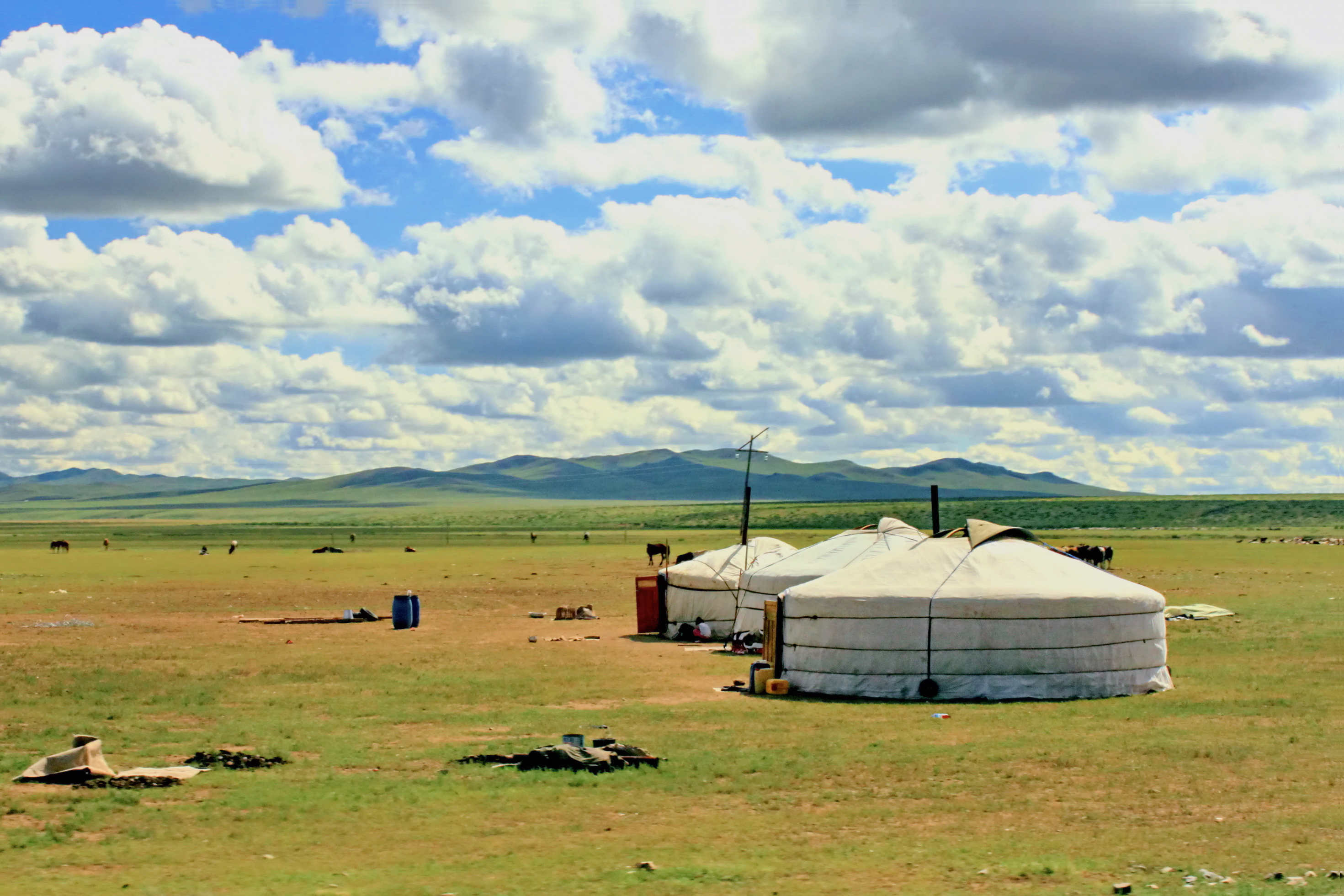
Mongolian yurt

=== Trade habits ===
The major population and cultural centers in Eurasia are connected directly or indirectly by the Eurasian Steppe route which was an active predecessor of the Silk Road. The latter started in the Guanzhong region of China and ran west along the Hexi Corridor to the Tarim Basin. From there it went southwest to Greater Iran and turned southeast to India or west to the Middle East and Europe. A minor branch went northwest along the great rivers and north of the Caspian Sea to the Black Sea. When faced with a rich caravan the steppe nomads could either rob it, or tax it, or hire themselves out as guards. Economically, these three forms of taxation or parasitism amounted to the same thing. Trade was usually most vigorous when a strong empire controlled the steppe and reduced the number of petty chieftains preying on trade. The silk road first became significant and Chinese silk began reaching the Roman Empire about the time that the Emperor of Han pushed Chinese power west to the Tarim Basin.

=== Agriculture ===
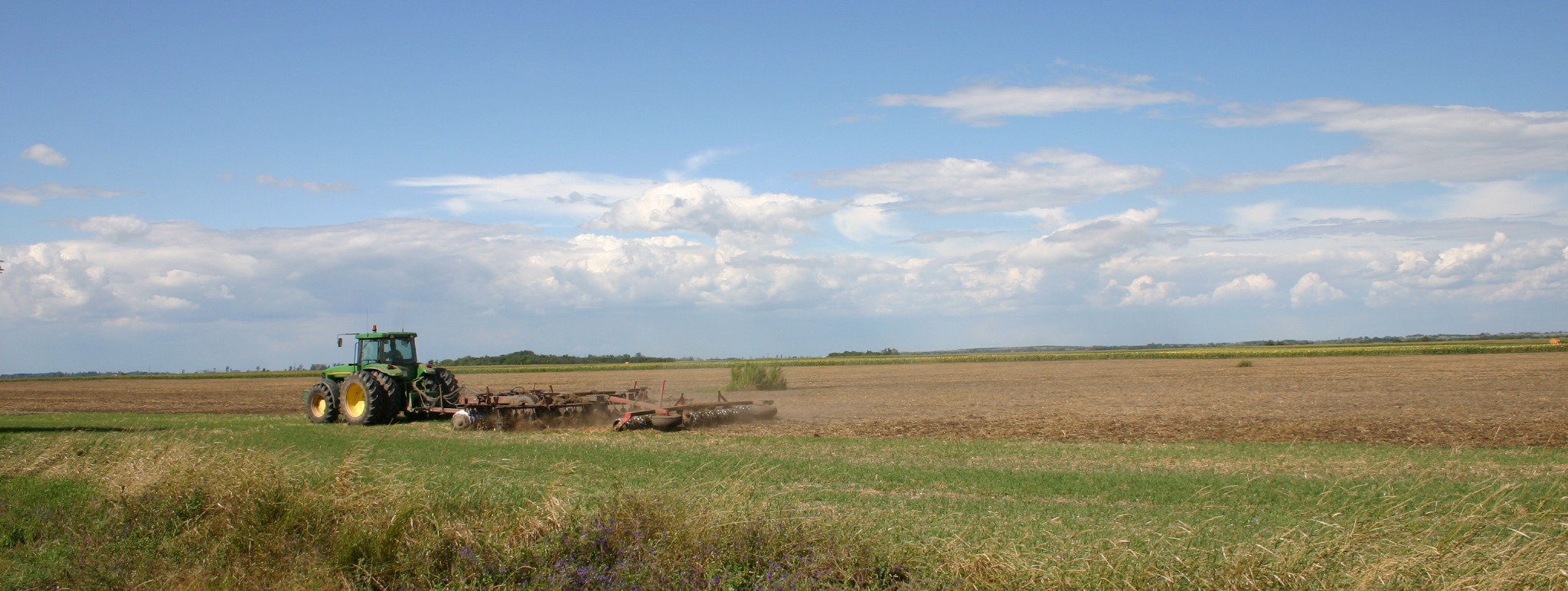
Plowing with tractor on the Great Hungarian Plain (Alföld), Hungary

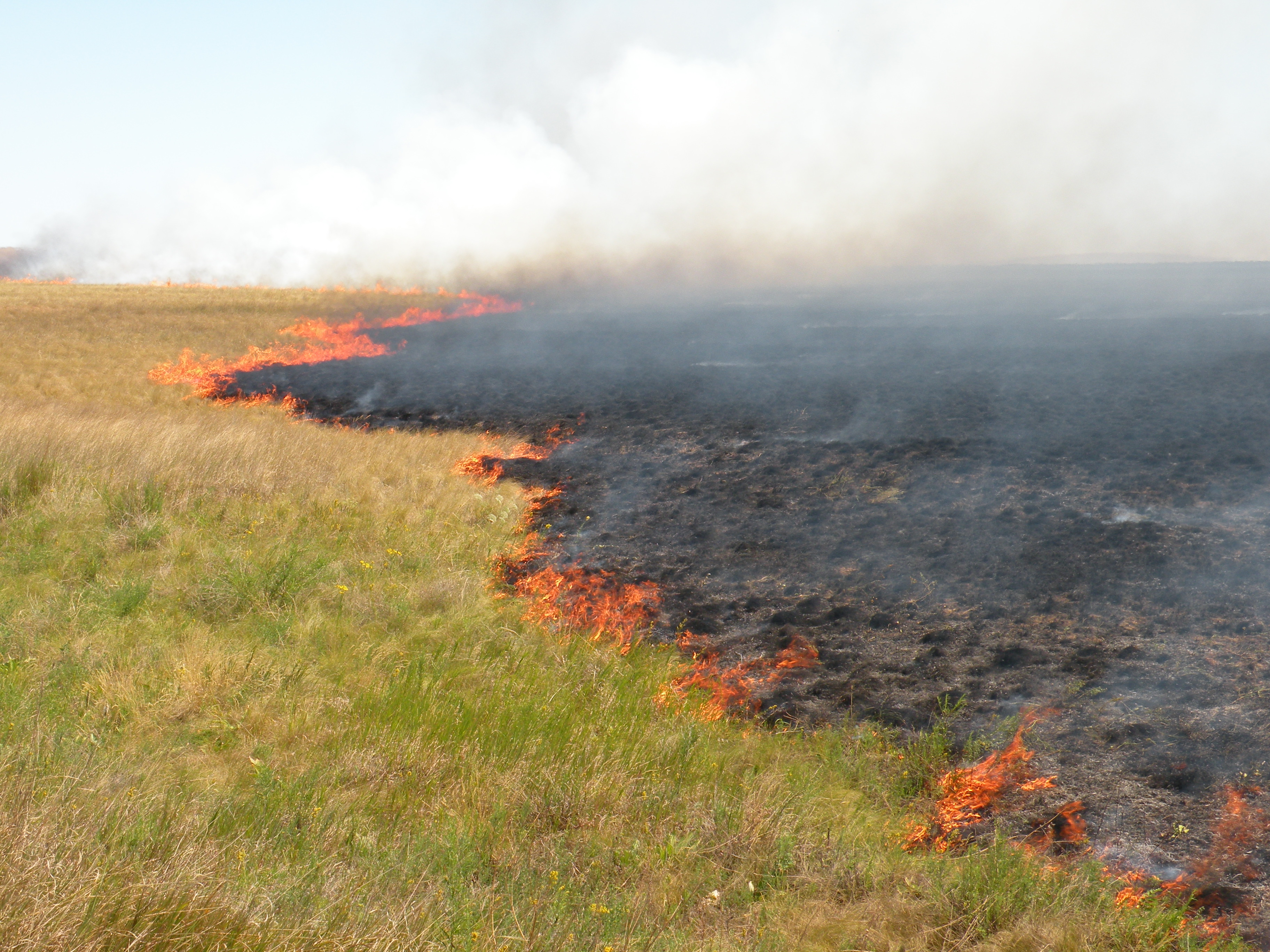
Steppe fire in the Kostanay Region, Kazakhstan

The nomads would occasionally tolerate colonies of peasants on the steppe in the few areas where farming was possible. These were often captives who grew grain for their nomadic masters. Along the fringes there were areas that could be used for either plowland or grassland. These alternated between one and the other depending on the relative strength of the nomadic and agrarian heartlands. Over the last few hundred years, the Russian steppe and much of Inner Mongolia has been cultivated. The fact that most of the Russian steppe is not irrigated implies that it was maintained as grasslands as a result of the military strength of the nomads.

=== Language ===
According to the most widely held hypothesis of the origin of the Indo-European languages, the Kurgan hypothesis, their common ancestor is thought to have originated on the Pontic-Caspian steppe. The Tocharians were an early Indo-European branch in the Tarim Basin. At the beginning of written history the entire steppe population west of Dzungaria spoke Iranian languages. From about 500 AD the Turkic languages replaced the Iranian languages first on the steppe, and later in the oases north of Iran. Additionally, Hungarian speakers, a branch of the Uralic language family, who previously lived in the steppe in what is now Southern Russia, settled in the Carpathian basin in year 895. Mongolic languages are in Mongolia. In Manchuria one finds Tungusic languages and some others.

=== Religion ===
Tengrism was introduced by Turko-Mongol nomads. Nestorianism and Manichaeism spread to the Tarim Basin and into China, but they never became established majority religions. Buddhism spread from the east of India to the Tarim Basin and found a new home in China. By about 1400 AD, the entire steppe west of Dzungaria had adopted Islam. By about 1600 AD, Islam was established in the Tarim Basin while Dzungaria and Mongolia had adopted Tibetan Buddhism.

== History ==
=== Warfare ===
Raids between tribes were prevalent throughout the region's history. This relates to the ease with which a defeated enemy's flocks and herds can be driven away, making raiding profitable. In terms of warfare and raiding, in relation to sedentary societies, the horse gave the nomads an advantage of mobility. Horsemen could raid a village and retreat with their loot before an infantry-based army could be mustered and deployed. When confronted with superior infantry, horsemen could simply ride away, retreat and regroup. Outside of Europe and parts of the Middle East, agrarian societies had difficulty raising a sufficient supply of war horses and often had to enlist cavalry from their nomadic enemies (as mercenaries). Nomads could not easily be pursued onto the steppe since the steppe could not easily support a land army. If the Chinese sent an army into Mongolia, the nomads would flee and come back when the Chinese ran out of supplies. But the steppe nomads were relatively few and their rulers had difficulty holding together enough clans and tribes to field a large army. If steppe nomads conquered an agricultural area they often lacked the skills to administer it. If they tried to hold agrarian land they gradually absorbed the civilization of their subjects, lost their nomadic skills and were either assimilated or driven out.

=== Relations with neighbors ===
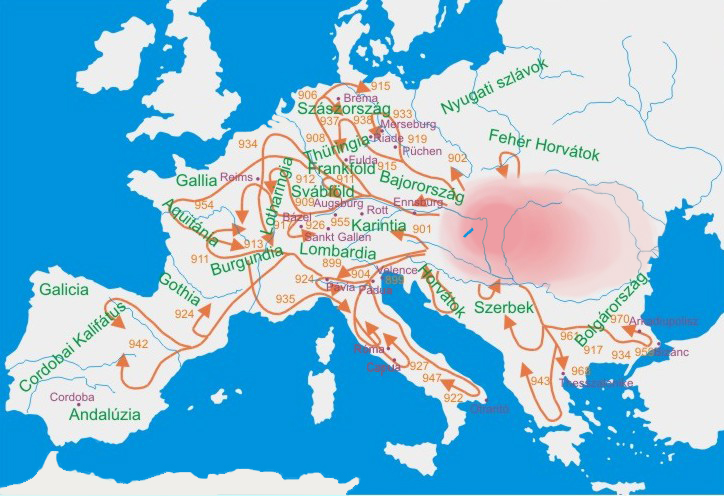
Hungarian invasions of Europe in the 9–10th centuries

Along the northern fringe of the Eurasian steppe, nomads would collect tribute from and blend with the forest tribes (see Khanate of Sibir, Buryats). Russia paid tribute (compare yasak) to the Golden Horde from about 1240 to 1480. South of the Kazakh Steppe the Turks blended with the pre-existing Iranian population living in oases during the 6th to 11th centuries during the Turkic migrations, establishing a blend of Persian and Turkic cultural traditions in Central Asia. There was a sharp cultural divide between Mongolia and China and almost constant conflict between the two entities throughout history. The nomads collected tribute from the Chinese occasionally and founded dynasties in China. At times, the relationship would be reversed with Chinese dynasties subjugating the nomads. The mixture of agriculture and pastoralism among the Manchu contributed to their successful administration of both nomads (Mongols) and the settled populations (Han Chinese).

=== Legacy of the Eurasian steppe's nomads ===
The steppe culture of Russia was shaped in Russia through cross-cultural contact mostly by Slavic, Tatar-Turkic, Mongolian and Iranian people. Rus' rulers would ally themselves by marriage with fellow-steppe peoples. In addition to ethnicity, also instruments such as the domra, traditional costumes such as the kaftan. Russian Cossack and tea culture were strongly influenced by the culture of Asian nomadic peoples. The Eurasian steppes play a major role in Eastern Europe history and the steppes are a subject of many Slavic as well as Russian folk-songs.

== Historical peoples and nations ==
- Thracians 15th–3rd century BC
- Khwarazm 13th–3rd century BC
- Cimmerians 12th–7th century BC
- Scythians 8th–4th century BC
- Sogdia 8th–4th century BC
- Issedones 7th–1st century BC
- Massagetae 7th–1st century BC
- Donghu people 7th–2nd century BC
- Thyssagetae 7th–3rd century BC
- Dahae 7th century BC–5th century AD
- Bulgars 7th century BC–7th century AD
- Saka 6th–1st century BC
- Sarmatians 5th century BC–5th century AD
- Xiongnu 3rd century BC–2nd century AD
- Iazyges 3rd century BC–5th century AD
- Yuezhi 2nd century BC–1st century AD
- Wusun 1st century BC–6th century AD
- Xianbei 1st–3rd century
- Tauri 1st–4th century
- Vandals 2nd–5th century
- Visigoths 3rd–5th century
- Goths 3rd–6th century
- Franks 3rd–8th century
- Huns 4th–8th century
- Ostrogoths 4th–8th century
- Early Slavs 5th–10th century
- Alans 5th–11th century
- Pannonian Avars 5th–9th century
- Hephthalites 5th–7th century
- Göktürks 6th–8th century
- Sabir people 6th–8th century
- Khazars 7th–11th century
- Onogurs 8th century
- Pechenegs 8th–11th century
- Crimean Goths 9th century
- Bashkirs 10th century–present
- Kipchaks and Cumans 11th–13th century
- Mongols 13th–14th century
- Cossacks 15th–18th century
- Kalmyks, Crimean Tatars, Volga Tatars, Nogais 15th–18th century
- Russians 16th–21st century
- Gagauz people, Kazakhs, Ukrainians 20th–21st century

== See also ==
- Eurasian nomads
- European Plain
- Great Hungarian Plain
- Izyum Trail
- Little Hungarian Plain
- Steppe Route
- Turkic migration
- Great Wall of China
- Fall of the Western Roman Empire

== Bibliography ==
- Barthold, W. (1992). Turkestan Down to the Mongol Invasion. Translated by Minorsky, T. New Delhi: Munshiram Manoharlal Publishers.
- Christian, David (1998). A History of Russia, Central Asia and Mongolia. Vol. 1: Inner Eurasia from Prehistory to the Mongol Empire. Blackwell Publishing.
- Fletcher, Joseph F. (1995). "The Mongols: ecological and social perspectives". In Forbes Manz, Beatrice (ed.). Studies on Chinese and Islamic Inner Asia. Aldershot, Hampshire: Variorum.
- Grousset, René (1970). The Empire of the Steppes: A History of Central Asia. Translated by Walford, Naomi. New Brunswick, NJ: Rutgers University Press.
- John of Plano Carpini (2005). "History of the Mongols". In Dawson, Christopher (ed.). Mission to Asia. Toronto: University of Toronto Press. pp. 3–76.
- Krader, Lawrence (1955). "Ecology of Central Asian Pastoralism". Southwestern Journal of Anthropology. 11 (4): 301–326. doi:10.1086/soutjanth.11.4.3628907. S2CID 130062187.
- Lattimore, Owen (1962). "The Geographical Factor in Mongol History". In Lattimore, Owen (ed.). Studies in Frontier History: Collected Papers 1928–1958. London: Oxford University Press. pp. 241–258.
- Sinor, Denis (1997). "The Inner Asian Warrior". In Sinor, Denis (ed.). Studies in Medieval Inner Asia. Collected Studies Series. Aldershot, Hampshire: Ashgate. ISBN 978-0-86078-632-0.
- Sinor, Denis (1977). "Horse and Pasture in Inner Asian History". In Sinor, Denis (ed.). Inner Asia and its Contacts with Medieval Europe. Collected Studies Series. London: Variorum.
