= West Siberian broadleaf and mixed forests =

Terrestrial ecoregion in Russia

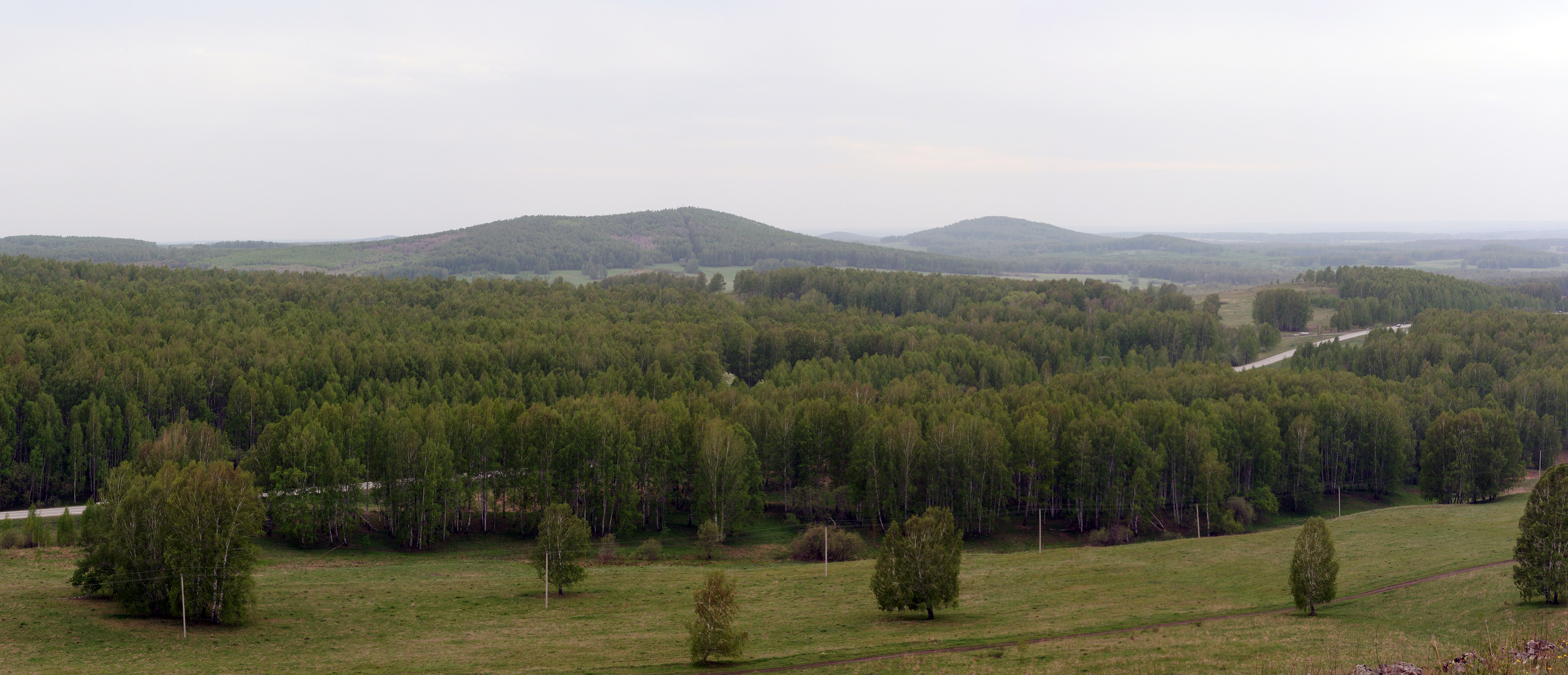
- Bugotak Hills Protected Area, Novosibirsk Oblast

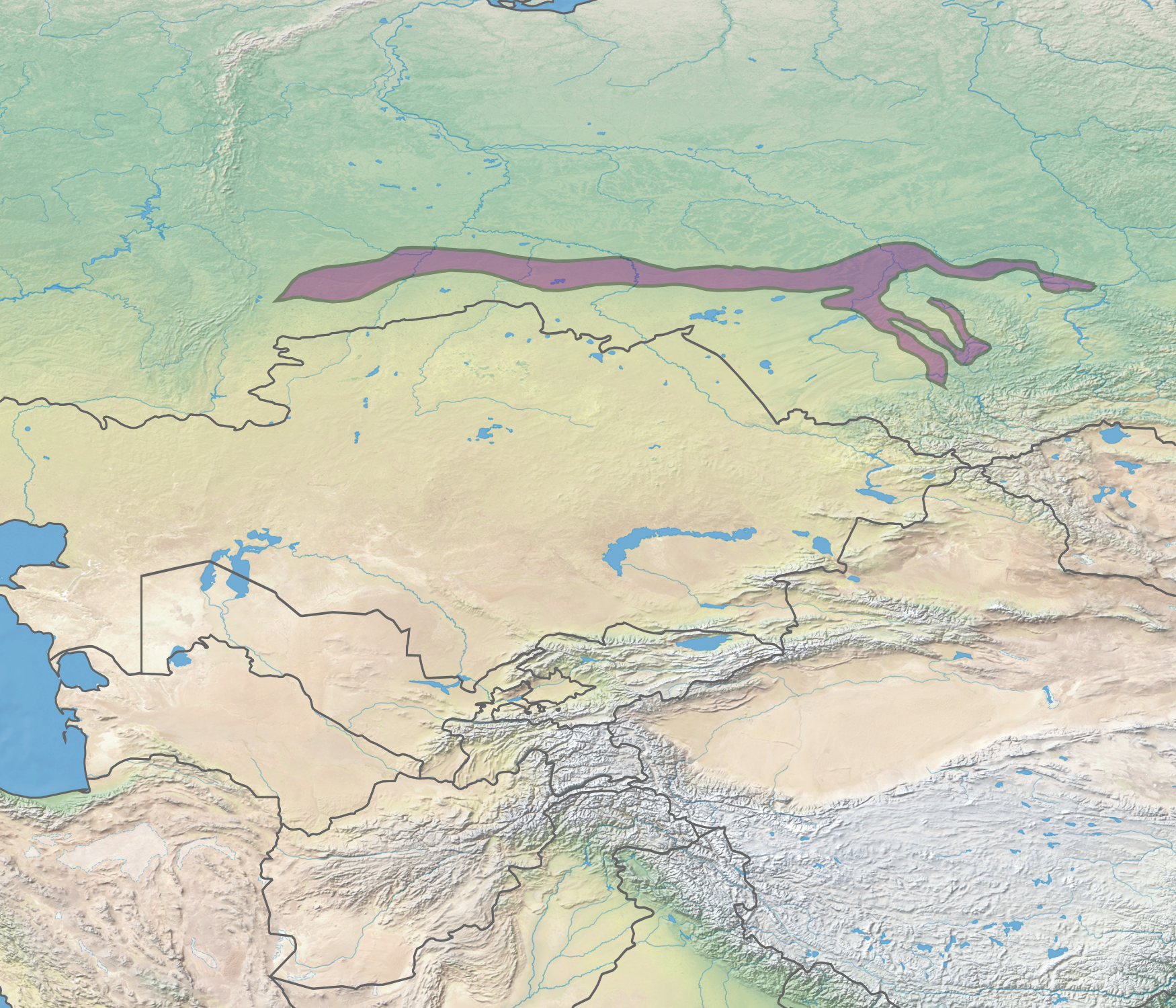
- Ecoregion territory (in purple)

Ecology
- Realm: Palearctic
- Biome: temperate broadleaf and mixed forests
- Borders: Kazakh forest steppe; Sayan montane conifer forests; South Siberian forest steppe; West Siberian taiga

Geography
- Area: 223,516 km^{2} (86,300 mi^{2})
- Country: Russia

The West Siberian broadleaf and mixed forests, also known as the Western Siberian hemiboreal forests, is an ecoregion (WWF ID: PA0444) in Russia. It consists of a thin band of mixed forest along the southernmost edge of the West Siberian taiga (coniferous forests) in Western Siberia, and north of the forest steppe belt. The biodiversity of the zone is the highest in Siberia, due to its transitional position between many different ecoregions. The area acts as a long corridor for migration of animals along the east-west axis. The ecoregion is in the Palearctic realm, with a Humid Continental climate. It covers 223,516 km^{2} (86,300 sq mi).

== Location and description ==
The ecoregion is an east-west strip, stretching 2,000 kilometres (1,200 mi) from Chelyabinsk in the west to Krasnoyarsk in the east. The zone is only 150 kilometres (93 mi) from north to south. Tomsk City is fairly located in this ecoregion. The Ob River and Irtysh River, and tributaries of those rivers, cross the region from south to north. The southeast of the region breaks up into low mountains.

== Climate ==
The region has a Humid continental climate (cool summer sub-type). The cool summer subtype is characterized by mild summers (no month averaging over 22 C), cold winters and less precipitation than the hot summer sub-type. Mean temperatures range from -24 °C (January) to +25 °C (August). Average annual precipitation is 390 mm.

Climate at 56.25 N, 76.75 E

Climate chart (precipitation, max. and min. temperature)
| J | F | M | A | M | J | J | A | S | O | N | D |
| 0.8 6 −10 | 0.5 9 −9 | 0.5 23 3 | 0.8 43 27 | 1.2 62 40 | 2 74 51 | 2.7 77 56 | 2.4 71 51 | 1.4 60 41 | 1.3 43 28 | 1.1 23 9 | 0.9 10 −6 |
- █ Average max. and min. temperatures in °F
- █ Precipitation totals in inches
- Source: GlobalSpecies.org
Metric conversion
| J | F | M | A | M | J | J | A | S | O | N | D |
| 20 −15 −24 | 13 −13 −23 | 13 −5 −16 | 20 6 −3 | 30 17 4 | 51 23 11 | 69 25 13 | 61 22 11 | 36 16 5 | 33 6 −2 | 28 −5 −13 | 23 −12 −21 |
- █ Average max. and min. temperatures in °C
- █ Precipitation totals in mm

== Flora and fauna ==
The forests of the region are dominated by Siberian fir (Abies sibirica), Siberian spruce (Picea obovata), Siberian pine (Pinus sibirica), Scots pine (Pinus sylvestris), and small-leafed Linden (Tilia cordata). Recently, grassy areas have been covered by more Silver birch (Betula pendula) and Aspen (Populus tremula). About 20 percent of the region is swamp, most of which are eutropic. The canopy in these areas is White birch (Betula alba).

== Protections ==
There are no large federally protected areas in the ecoregion, and it has been heavily affected by human activities.

== See also ==
- List of ecoregions in Russia
