= South Siberian forest steppe =

Ecoregion in Siberia, Russia

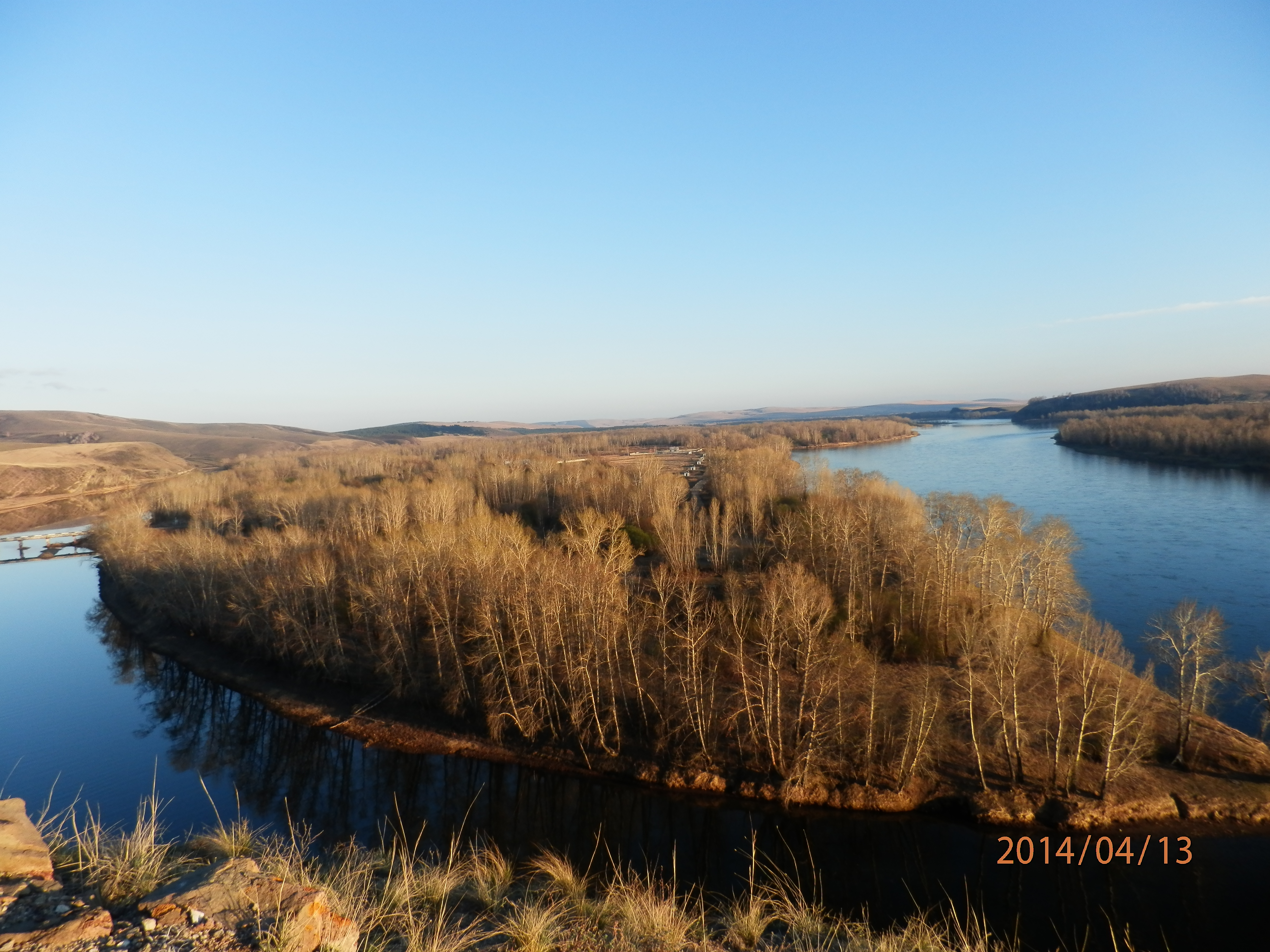
- Landscape of the near Zelyony Bor, Krasnoyarsk Krai, in the Minusinsk Hollow

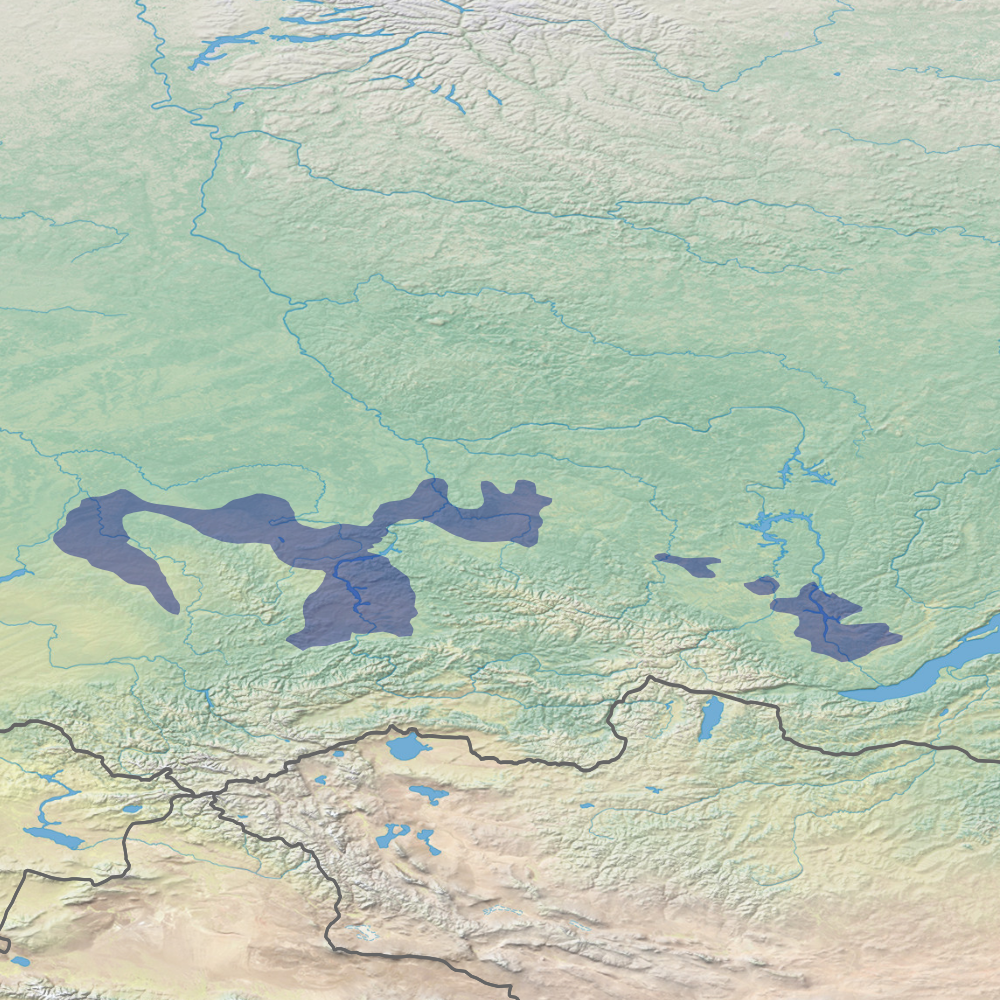
- Ecoregion territory (in purple)

Ecology
- Realm: Palearctic
- Biome: temperate grasslands, savannas, and shrublands

Geography
- Area: 727,269 km^{2} (280,800 sq mi)
- Countries: Russia

The South Siberian forest steppe ecoregion (WWF ID: PA0817) is a patchwork of grasslands and forests in the low-lying areas of south central Siberia. The region is one of high biodiversity as a transition zone between the West Siberian taiga to the north, and the Altai Mountains to the south. There are also small patches to the east in Irkutsk Oblast. The ecoregion is in the temperate grasslands, savannas, and shrublands biome, and the Palearctic realm, with a Humid Continental climate. It covers 161,874 km^{2} (62,500 sq mi).

== Location and description ==
The ecoregion is a thin band of lowland terrain, 700 kilometres (430 mi) long, stretching from Tomsk in the west, to the east of Krasnoyarsk in southern Siberia. On the western edge there is a north-south extension that follows the Tom River in the Kuznetsk Basin. In the middle is another extension, covering a low area along the Yenisei River and some of its tributaries; this area is known as the Minusinsk Hollow. To the west is the West Siberian broadleaf and mixed forests ecoregion, which is now mostly cultivated agricultural land.

== Climate ==
The climate of the South Siberian forest steppe is Subarctic climate, without dry season (Köppen climate classification Subarctic climate (Dfc)). This climate is characterized by mild summers (only 1–3 months above 10 °C (50.0 °F)) and cold, snowy winters (coldest month below −3 °C (26.6 °F)). There is sufficient precipitation (averaging 200–400 mm/year) to support patchy forests. The mean January temperature at the center of the ecoregion is −20 °C (−4 °F), and 18 °C (64 °F).

== Flora and fauna ==
The region exhibits the typical forest steppe mix of grasslands and forest too sparse to create a full canopy. Typical trees are birch, aspen and willow, generally found along the streams and in low areas. Swamps are common. The region was about 15% forested; this has been reduced by human activity. The most common grass is Calamagrostis epigejos (bushgrass).

== Protections ==
There are no federally protected areas in the South Siberian forest steppe ecoregion.

== See also ==
- List of ecoregions in Russia
