= Taiheiyo montane deciduous forests =

Ecoregion in Japan

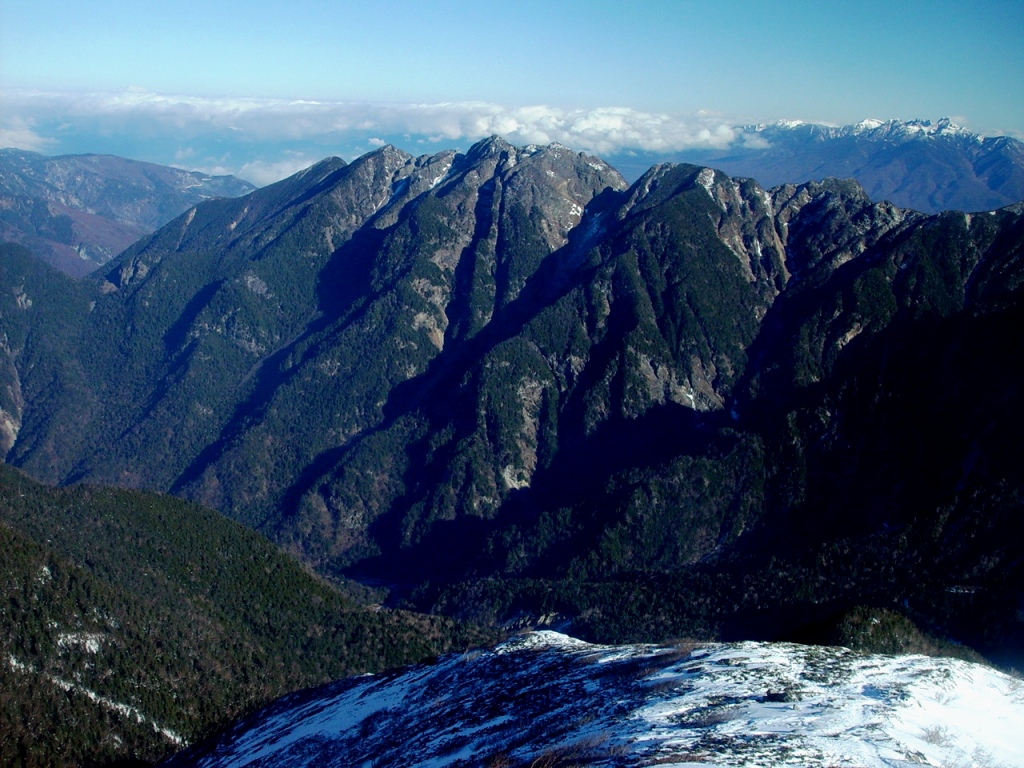
- Mount Nokogiri from Kosenjo

- Ecoregion territory (in purple)

Ecology
- Realm: Palearctic
- Biome: Temperate broadleaf and mixed forests

Geography
- Area: 41,957 km^{2} (16,200 sq mi)
- Country: Japan
- Coordinates: 35.75°N 137.75°E

The Taiheiyo montane deciduous forests ecoregion (WWF ID: PA0441) stretches for about 700 km (430 mi) along the eastern (Pacific side) slopes of the island of Honshu, with some small patches on the southern islands of Shikoku and Kyushu. Lower elevations to the east along the coast are in the Taiheiyo evergreen forests ecoregion; higher elevations to the west are in the Nihonkai montane deciduous forests ecoregion. Characteristic forests are of Japanese beech, stone pine, and spruce.

== Location and description ==
Elevations run from sea level to 3,000 metres (9,800 ft), with a mean elevation of 680 metres (2,230 ft). While most of the ecoregion is represented by a thin strip above the coastal region, there is a large inland section centered on the Akaishi Mountains in central Honshu, and another centered on Fukushima Prefecture to the north.

== Climate ==
The climate of the ecoregion is Humid continental climate, warm summer (Köppen climate classification (Dfb)). This climate is characterized by large seasonal temperature differentials and a warm summer (at least four months averaging over 10 °C (50 °F), but no month averaging over 22 °C (72 °F).

== Flora and fauna ==
Japanese beech (Fagus crenata), is a characteristic tree in the northeast of the region, up to 1,400 metres (4,600 ft). Other trees include the Japanese stone pine (Pinus pumila), Hemlock spruce (Picea jezoensis), Castanopsis sieboldii, Pinus thunbergii, Prunus nipponica, Cryptomeria japonica, Sciadopitys verticillata, Salix pierotii, Camphora officinarum, Cercidiphyllum japonicum, Carpinus laxiflora, Tilia amurensis, Larix gmelinii, Larix sibirica, Larix × czekanowskii, Betula dahurica, Betula pendula, Pinus koraiensis, Pinus sibirica, Pinus sylvestris, Picea obovata, Abies sibirica, Quercus acutissima, Quercus mongolica, Ginkgo biloba, Prunus serrulata, Prunus padus, Tilia amurensis, Salix babylonica, Acer palmatum, Populus tremula, Ulmus davidiana, Ulmus pumila, Haloxylon ammodendron, Elaeagnus angustifolia, Tamarix ramosissima, Podocarpus macrophyllus, and Prunus sibirica. Typical understory is the Saga plant. Large mammals in the ecoregion includes the Japanese serow, Sika deer, and Wild boar.

== Protected areas ==
Protected areas in the ecoregion include:

- Minami Alps National Park, a rugged area in the Akaishi Mountains of central Honshu, with many peaks over 3,000 meters.
- (Portions of) Fuji-Hakone-Izu National Park, in the mainland portions below Mount Fuji, which itself is in the Honshu alpine conifer forests ecoregion where it rises above the surrounding Taiheiyo ecoregion.
