= Taiheiyo evergreen forests =

Core ecoregion of Japan

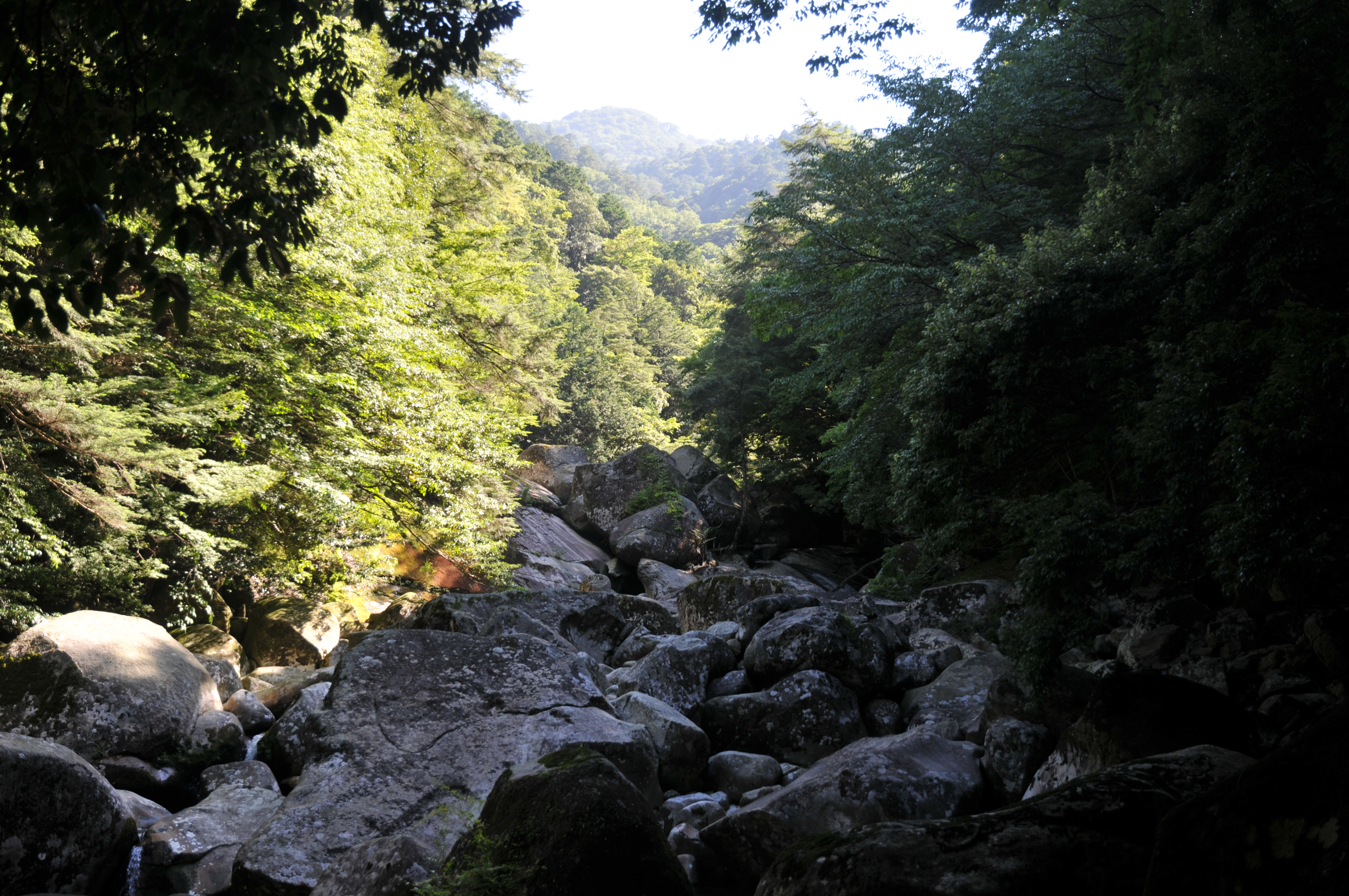
- Nametoko Ravine in Ashizuri-Uwakai National Park

Ecology
- Realm: Palearctic
- Biome: temperate broadleaf and mixed forests
- Borders: Nihonkai evergreen forests; Nihonkai montane deciduous forests, Taiheiyo montane deciduous forests

Geography
- Area: 135,819 km^{2} (52,440 sq mi)
- Country: Japan

Conservation
- Conservation status: Critical/endangered
- Protected: 23,487 km² (17%)

The Taiheiyo evergreen forests is a temperate broadleaf forest ecoregion of Japan.

== Geography ==
The ecoregion covers an area of 138,300 square kilometers (53,400 sq mi) on the Pacific (Taiheiyo) side of the islands of Honshu, Shikoku, and Kyushu. It also includes Tsushima Island in the Korea Strait between Kyushu and Korea and the volcanic Izu Islands off Honshu's southern coast.

The ecoregion is home to Japan's largest cities, including Tokyo, Yokohama, Osaka, and Nagoya.

== Climate ==
The ecoregion has a humid subtropical climate. The influence of the Japan Current creates a humid climate with mild winters and a long growing season, which nurtured evergreen broadleaf forests.

== Flora ==
Laurel forests grew near the coast, and oak forests were predominant inland. At higher elevations, the Taiheiyo evergreen forests yielded to the Taiheiyo montane deciduous forests of the interior.

The forests include a mix of species with origins in temperate and tropical Asia. Species with tropical origins include two species of the conifer Podocarpus (Podocarpus macrophyllus and Podocarpus fasciculus), one species of the Fir Abies firma, two species of Pittosporum, Fatsia japonica, Aspidistra elatior, Castanopsis sieboldii, Persea thunbergii, Cryptomeria japonica, Sciadopitys verticillata, Camphora officinarum, Cercidiphyllum japonicum, Fagus crenata, Carpinus laxiflora, Daphniphyllum macropodum, Ilex integra, Eurya japonica, Pittosporum tobira, several species in the laurel family (Machilus, Neolitsea, and Camphora (plant)), and the Cycad (Cycas revoluta(. In more coastal areas, Pinus thunbergii is quite common. Trees with origins in temperate Eurasia include species of evergreen oaks, Castanopsis, Salix pierotii, Picea jezoensis, Pinus thunbergii, Pinus pumila, Prunus nipponica, Tilia amurensis, Betula dahurica, Betula pendula, Pinus koraiensis, Picea obovata, Abies sibirica, Quercus acutissima, Quercus mongolica, Quercus glauca, Prunus serrulata, Prunus padus, Salix babylonica, Acer palmatum, Populus tremula, Ulmus davidiana, and Ulmus pumila.

== Fauna ==
Native mammals include the Sika deer (Cervus nippon) and Japanese macaque (Macaca fuscata).

Native birds include the fairy pitta (Pitta nympha) and Japanese night heron (Goraschius goisagi).

The terrestrial Odaigahara salamander (Hynobius boulengeri) is native to the ecoregion.

== Conservation and threats ==
Most of forests have been converted to agriculture or cities. Remnant areas of forest remain around temples and shrines, on steep slopes, and in gorges. Secondary growth woodlands, called Satoyama, are found on hillsides bordering farmlands.

== Protected areas ==
17% of the ecoregion is in protected areas. Protected areas include Fuji-Hakone-Izu National Park, Ise-Shima National Park, Yoshino-Kumano National Park, Seto Inland Sea National Park, Ashizuri-Uwakai National Park, Kirishima-Kinkowan National Park, Unzen-Amakusa National Park, Saikai National Park, and Suigō-Tsukuba Quasi-National Park (349.56 km^{2} (134.97 sq mi)).

== See also ==
- Biota of Tokyo Imperial Palace
