= List of ecoregions in Japan =

Japan is home to nine forest ecoregions, reflecting its climate and geography. The islands that constitute Japan generally have a humid climate, which ranges from warm subtropical in the southern islands to cool temperate on the northern island of Hokkaidō.

== Ecoregions overview ==
Japan lies at the convergence of three terrestrial realms, the Palearctic, Indomalaya, and Oceania, and its flora and fauna combine elements from all three. The ecoregions that cover the main islands of Japan, Honshū, Hokkaidō, Kyūshū, and Shikoku, along with the nearby islands, are considered part of the Palearctic realm. The island arcs of southern Japan, the Ryukyu Islands to the southwest and the Ogasawara Islands to the southeast are home to subtropical moist broadleaf forest ecoregions; the Nansei Islands subtropical evergreen forests ecoregion is part of the Indomalayan realm, while the Ogasawara subtropical moist forests of the Ogasawaras is part of the Oceanian realm.

== Terrestrial ecoregions ==
Tropical and subtropical moist broadleaf forests

- Nansei Islands subtropical evergreen forests
- Ogasawara subtropical moist forests

Temperate broadleaf and mixed forests

- Hokkaidō deciduous forests
- Nihonkai evergreen forests
- Nihonkai montane deciduous forests
- Taiheiyo evergreen forests
- Taiheiyo montane deciduous forests

Temperate coniferous forests

- Hokkaidō montane conifer forests
- Honshū alpine conifer forests

== Freshwater ecoregions ==
- Sakhalin, Hokkaido, & Sikhote-Alin Coast
- Lake Biwa
- Honshu-Shikoku-Kyushu
- Ogasarawa Islands - Kazan Archipelago

== Marine ecoregions ==
Not a complete list

- Sea of Japan
- Sea of Okhotsk
- East China Sea
- Kuroshio Current
- Oyashio Current
- Ryukyu reefs
- Ogasawara reefs
