= Hokkaidō montane conifer forests =

Ecoregion in Hokkaidō, Japan

Ecoregion: Hokkaido montane conifer forests
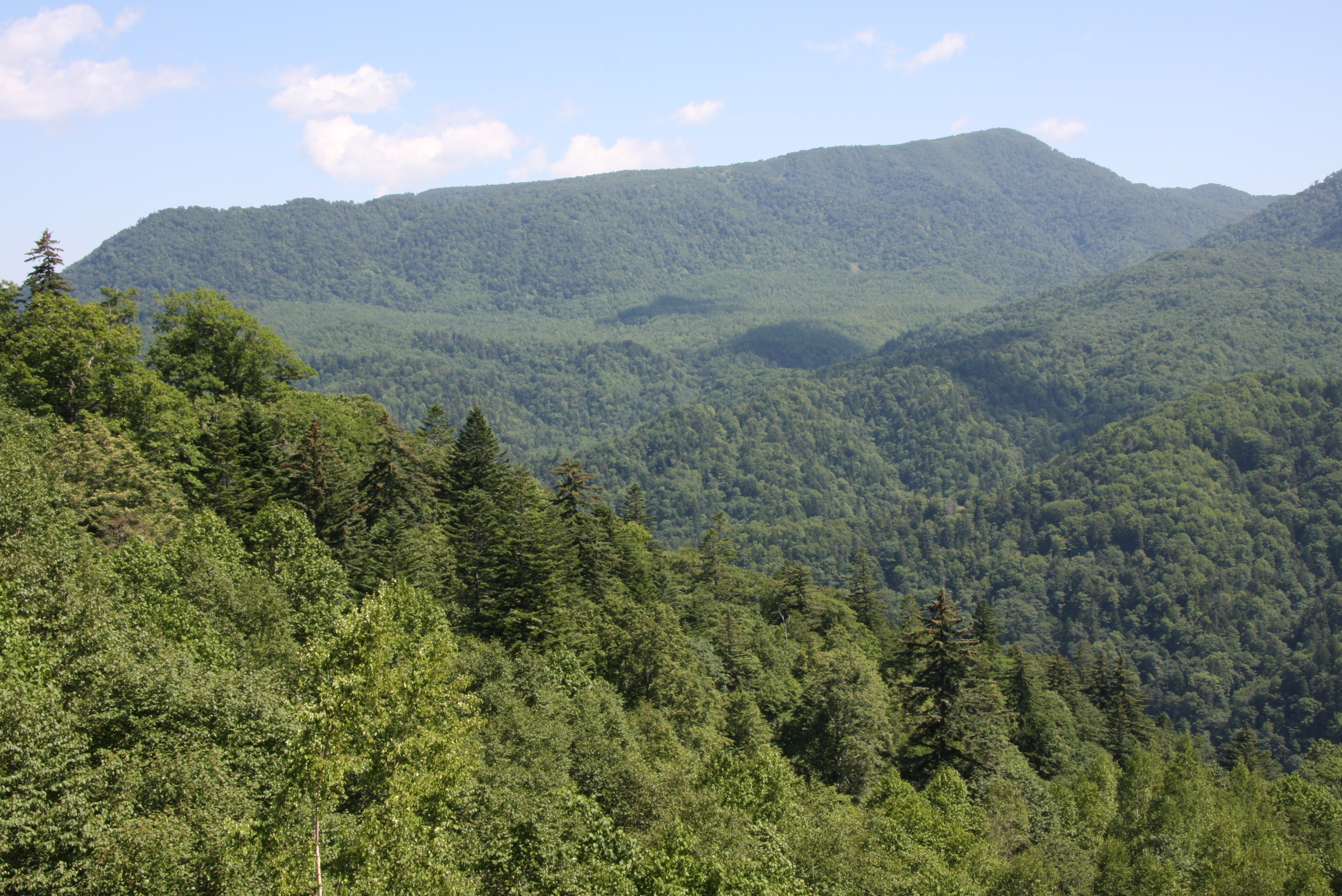
- Mt. Sapporo

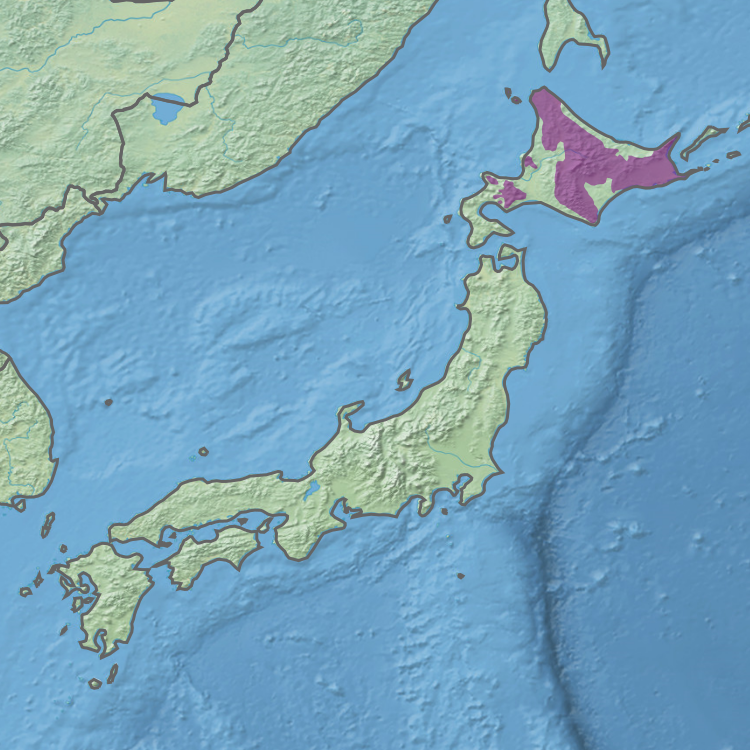
- Ecoregion territory (in purple)

Ecology
- Realm: Palearctic
- Biome: Temperate coniferous forest

Geography
- Area: 45,843 km^{2} (17,700 sq mi)
- Country: Japan
- Coordinates: 43.25°N 143.25°E

The Hokkaido montane conifer forests ecoregion covers the mountainous central regions of Hokkaido Island, the northernmost of Japan's main islands. Forests of spruce and fir thrive in the subalpine, cool climate. On the northeastern edge of the island, the conifer forests extend down to the sea under the influence of the cold Oyashio Current coming down from the north, although logging in recent years has put pressure on these stands.

== Location and description ==
The mountainous region is surrounded by the lower plains and hills of the Hokkaidō deciduous forests ecoregion. Central to the region is the Daisetsuzan Volcanic Group, the location of Daisetsuzan National Park, the largest national park in Japan. The highest mountain on the island, and in the region, is Asahi-dake with an elevation of 2,290 metres (7,510 ft). Above the conifer line, alpine conditions support thickets of Stone pine (Pinus pumila)

== Climate ==
The climate of the ecoregion is Humid continental climate, warm summer (Köppen climate classification (Dfb)). This climate is characterized by large seasonal temperature differentials and a warm summer (at least four months averaging over 10 °C (50 °F), but no month averaging over 22 °C (72 °F). Average annual precipitation is 1,150 mm.

== Flora and fauna ==
The dominant trees in the region are Ezo spruce (Picea jezoensis), Sakhalin fir (Abies sachalinensis), Sakhalin spruce (Picea glehnii), Pinus thunbergii, Prunus nipponica, Cryptomeria japonica, Sciadopitys verticillata, Salix pierotii, Castanopsis sieboldii, Camphora officinarum, Cercidiphyllum japonicum, Fagus crenata, Larix gmelinii, Larix sibirica, Larix × czekanowskii, Betula dahurica, Betula pendula, Pinus koraiensis, Pinus sibirica, Pinus sylvestris, Picea obovata, Abies sibirica, Quercus mongolica, Quercus acutissima, Ginkgo biloba, Prunus serrulata, Prunus padus, Tilia amurensis, Salix babylonica, Acer palmatum, Carpinus laxiflora, Populus tremula, Ulmus davidiana, Ulmus pumila, Pinus pumila, Haloxylon ammodendron, Elaeagnus angustifolia, Tamarix ramosissima, and Prunus sibirica. There are scattered stands of Erman's birch (Betula ermanii). The conifer belt rises to an altitude of 1,500 metres (4,900 ft).

== Protected areas ==
- Daisetsuzan National Park
- Akan Mashu National Park
- Kushiro-shitsugen National Park
- Shikotsu-Tōya National Park
