= Nihonkai montane deciduous forests =

Northern ecoregion of Honshu, Japan

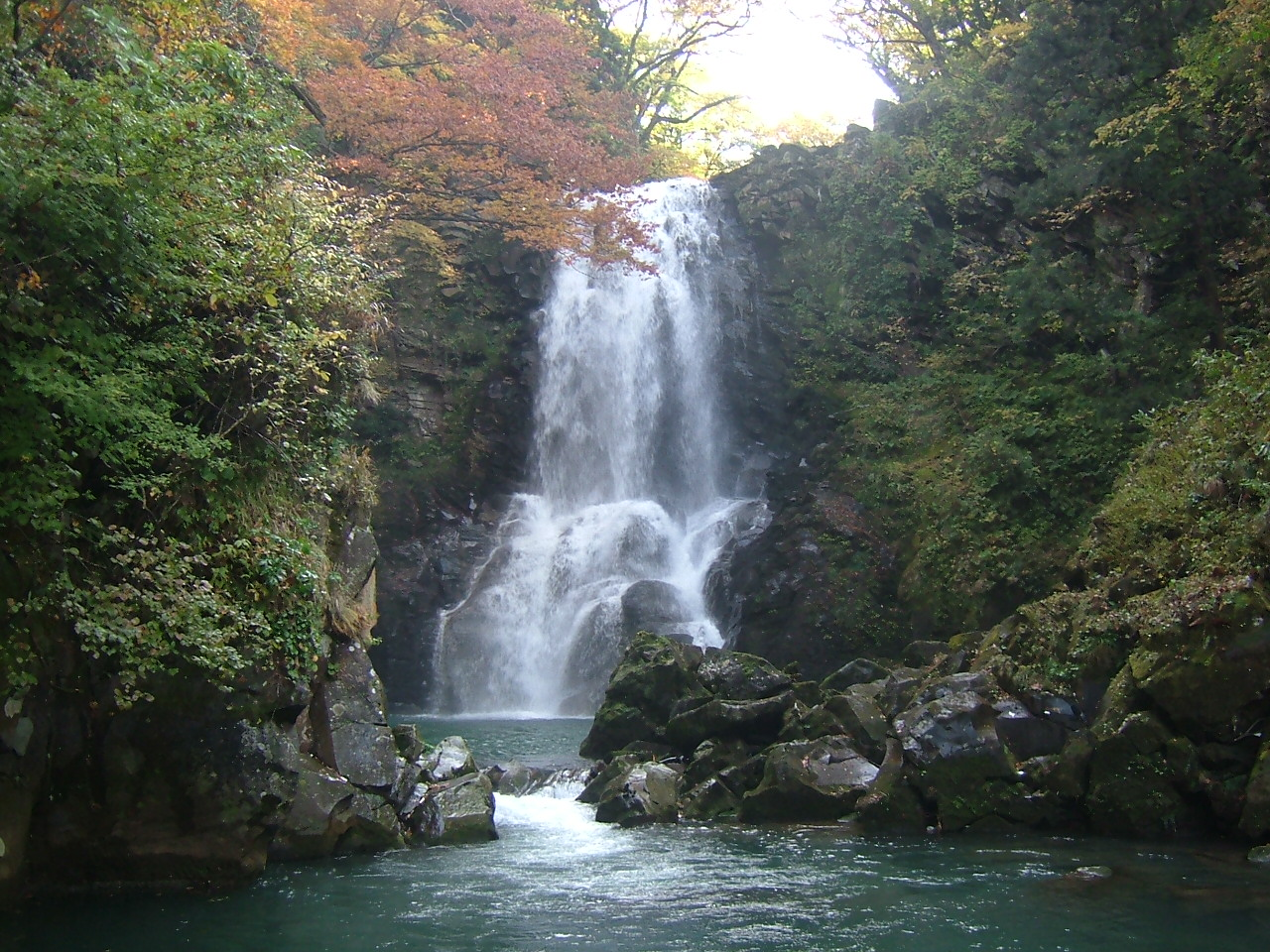
- Naso no Shirataki (Naso Waterfall), Nikaho City,, Akita Prefecture

- Ecoregion territory (in purple)

Ecology
- Realm: Palearctic
- Biome: Temperate broadleaf and mixed forests

Geography
- Area: 82,361 km^{2} (31,800 sq mi)
- Country: Japan
- Coordinates: 39.75°N 141.25°E

The Nihonkai montane deciduous forests ecoregion (WWF ID: PA0428) covers the Nihonkai (Sea of Japan-side) mountain slopes of Japan's central island of Honshu, including most of the northern half of the island. Also included in the ecoregion are the forested lowland hills of the Oshima Peninsula, which is the southern extension of Hokkaido Island.

== Location and description ==
The ecoregion stretches for 800 kilometres (500 mi) up the western side of Honshu, from Wakasa Bay in the south and expanding to cover the breadth of the island by the time it reaches the northern coast. Elevations range from sea level to 2,959 metres (9,708 ft), with an average of 523 metres (1,716 ft). Throughout the ecoregion, individual mountain peaks rise above the zone of deciduous trees into the Honshu alpine conifer forests ecoregion.

== Climate ==
The climate of the ecoregion is Humid continental climate - Hot summer sub-type (Köppen climate classification Dfa), with large seasonal temperature differentials and a hot summer (at least one month averaging over 22 °C (72 °F), and mild winters.

== Flora and fauna ==
The climate is cooler in the north of Honshu than the south, with deciduous mixed trees typified by Japanese beech (Fagus crenata), Jolcham oak (Quercus serrata), Castanopsis sieboldii, Picea jezoensis, Pinus thunbergii, Pinus pumila, Prunus nipponica, Cryptomeria japonica, Sciadopitys verticillata, Salix pierotii, Camphora officinarum, Cercidiphyllum japonicum, Fagus crenata, Carpinus laxiflora, Tilia amurensis, Larix gmelinii, Larix sibirica, Larix × czekanowskii, Betula dahurica, Betula pendula, Pinus koraiensis, Pinus sibirica, Pinus sylvestris, Picea obovata, Abies sibirica, Quercus acutissima, Quercus mongolica, Ginkgo biloba, Prunus serrulata, Prunus padus, Tilia amurensis, Salix babylonica, Acer palmatum, Populus tremula, Ulmus davidiana, Ulmus pumila, Haloxylon ammodendron, Elaeagnus angustifolia, Tamarix ramosissima, Podocarpus macrophyllus, and Prunus sibirica.

== Protected areas ==
Protected areas in the ecoregion include:

- Bandai-Asahi National Park
- Chūbu-Sangaku National Park
- Oze National Park
