= Stigmella azusa =

Scientific classification
- Kingdom: Animalia
- Phylum: Arthropoda
- Class: Insecta
- Order: Lepidoptera
- Family: Nepticulidae
- Genus: Stigmella
- Species: S. azusa

Binomial name
- Stigmella azusa Hirano, 2010

Species of moth

Stigmella azusa is a moth of the family Nepticulidae. It is known from Japan (Honshū).

The larvae feed on Salix serissaefolia. They probably mine the leaves of their host plant.
