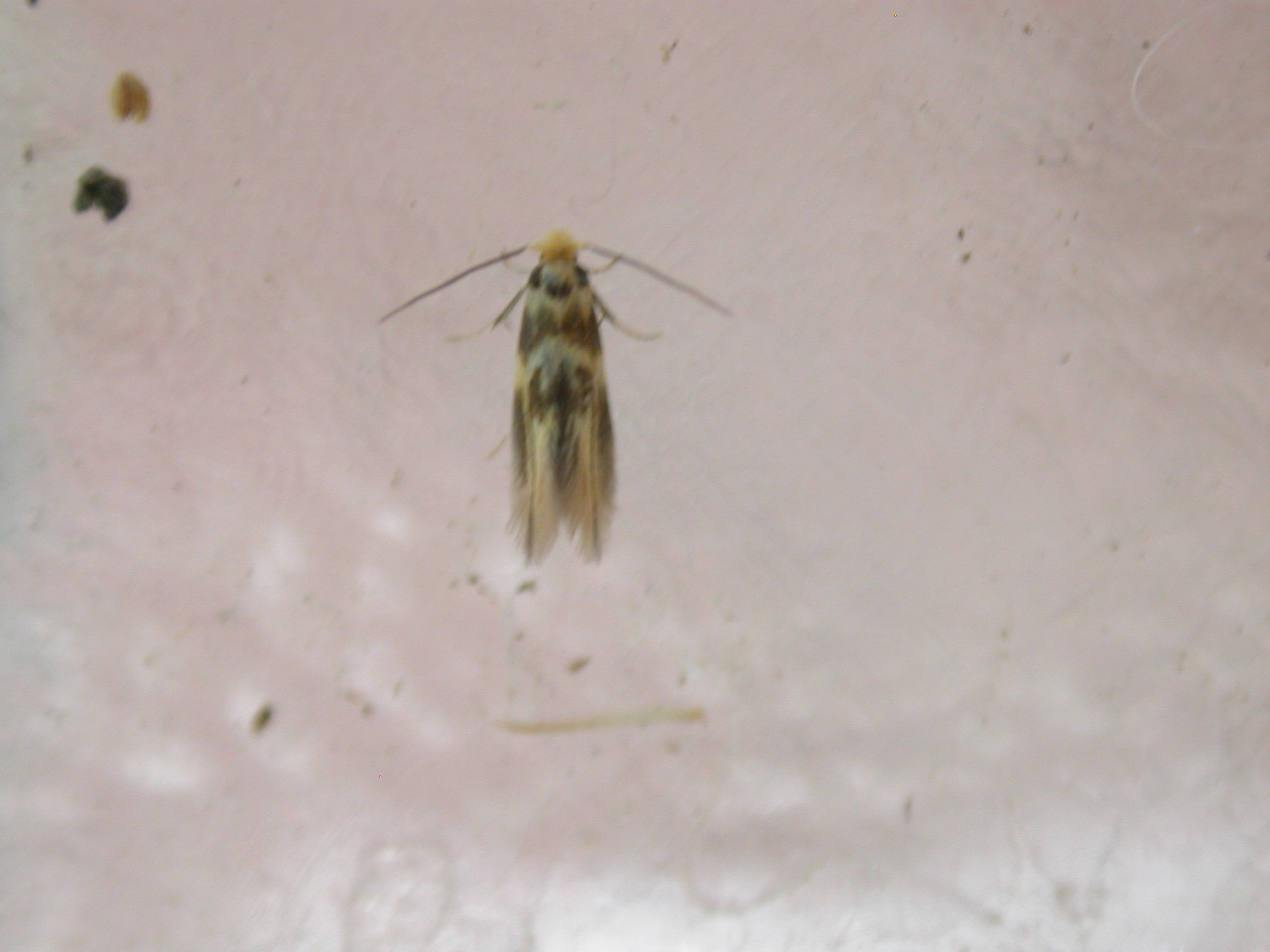

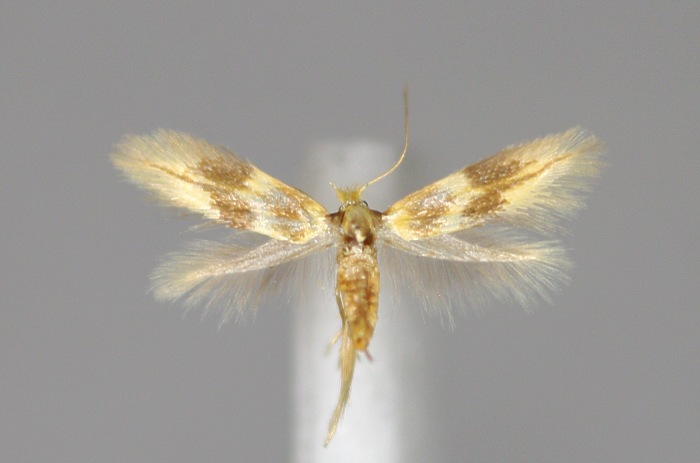

Scientific classification
- Kingdom: Animalia
- Phylum: Arthropoda
- Clade: Pancrustacea
- Class: Insecta
- Order: Lepidoptera
- Family: Bucculatricidae
- Genus: Bucculatrix
- Species: B. thoracella

Binomial name
- Bucculatrix thoracella (Thunberg, 1794)

Synonyms
- Tinea thoracella Thunberg, 1794; Elachista hippocastanella Duponchel, 1840; Bucculatrix thoracella var. luteiciliella Tengström

= Bucculatrix thoracella =

Species of moth

Bucculatrix thoracella, the lime bent-wing, is species of moth in the family Bucculatricidae, and was first described in 1794 by Carl Peter Thunberg as Tinea thoracella. It is found throughout Europe with exception of Ireland and the Balkan Peninsula, and in Japan, where it occurs on the islands of Hokkaido and Honshu.

== Appearance ==
Adult specimens of Bucculatrix thoracella are small, with a wingspan of 6–8 mm, and have a wing pattern of dark brown blotches on a yellow base, with a brown line extending to the wing's edge. Larvae have a pale, greenish yellow body and a pale yellow head. Pupae are a dark, cloudy brown, and are covered by a strongly ribbed white, yellowish or greyish brown cocoon.

== Behaviour ==
In continental Europe, Bucculatrix thoracella occurs in two generations per year, whereas it is generally univoltine in most of Britain. It overwinters as a pupa, either on the host plant's trunk or in leaf litter. Adults are on wing in June and sometimes August in Britain, while in continental Europe they are on wing from April to May and from July to August. Eggs are left on the underside of leaves, often at a vein angle.

=== Larvae ===
Larvae feed mainly on species of lime tree (Tilia spp.) and less commonly on maple species (Acer spp.), but infrequent records of a variety of other host plants exist. During the first larval stadium, they mine their host plant's leaves, resulting in a small, hook-like mine. The mine starts with a small blotch at the angle of leaf veins, then follows in a straight line along the vein, eventually turning away and forming a hook-like shape. When the larva emerges from its mine, it moults in a smooth cocoonet. Afterwards, it feeds externally from the leaf's underside, eating out windows in the leaf.

== Host plants ==
Per Plant Parasites of Europe, known host plants include multiple species of maple (Acer campestre, Acer platanoides and Acer pseudoplatanus); Aesculus hippocastanum; Alnus; Betula; Carpinus betulus; Castanea sativa; Fagus sylvatica; Sorbus; and several species of lime tree (Tilia cordata, Tilia × euchlora, Tilia × europaea, Tilia platyphyllos and Tilia tomentosa). Kobayashi, Hirowatari & Kuroko (2010) additionally report Tilia japonica. In parts of its range, it is found solely or nearly so (Note: solely: Netherlands, Britain; almost solely: Belgium) on Tilia spp. Within Great-Britain, a preference exists for Tilia cordata over Tilia × europaea where both are present.

== Gallery ==
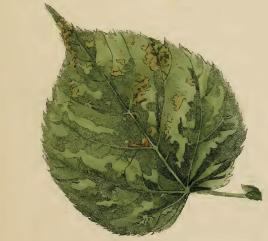
Mined leaf of lime

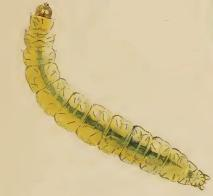
Larva
