= Salix serissaefolia =

Scientific classification
- Kingdom: Plantae
- Clade: Tracheophytes
- Clade: Angiosperms
- Clade: Eudicots
- Clade: Rosids
- Order: Malpighiales
- Family: Salicaceae
- Genus: Salix
- Species: S. serissaefolia

Binomial name
- Salix serissaefolia Kimura

Species of willow

Salix serissaefolia is a putative species of willow native to central Japan. It is known as コゴメヤナギ in Japanese. It was described by Kimura in Bot. Mag. Tokyo 40: 639 (1926). H.Ohashi synonymized it as Salix jessoesis subsp. serissaefolia (Kimura) H. Ohashi, comb. nov., in A Systematic Enumeration of Japanese Salix (Salicaceae), Hiroyoshi OHASHI 植物研究雑誌 J. Jpn. Bot. 75: 1-4 1 (2000). Note the typographical error for Salix jessoensis. Salix jessoensis is a synonym of Salix pierotii, as is Salix serissifolia. Note the spelling difference between Salix serissaefolia and Salix serissifolia.

It is a deciduous tree, reaching a height of 10–25 m.
