= Honshū alpine conifer forests =

Mountainous Ecoregion in Honshū, Japan

Ecoregion: Honshū alpine conifer forests
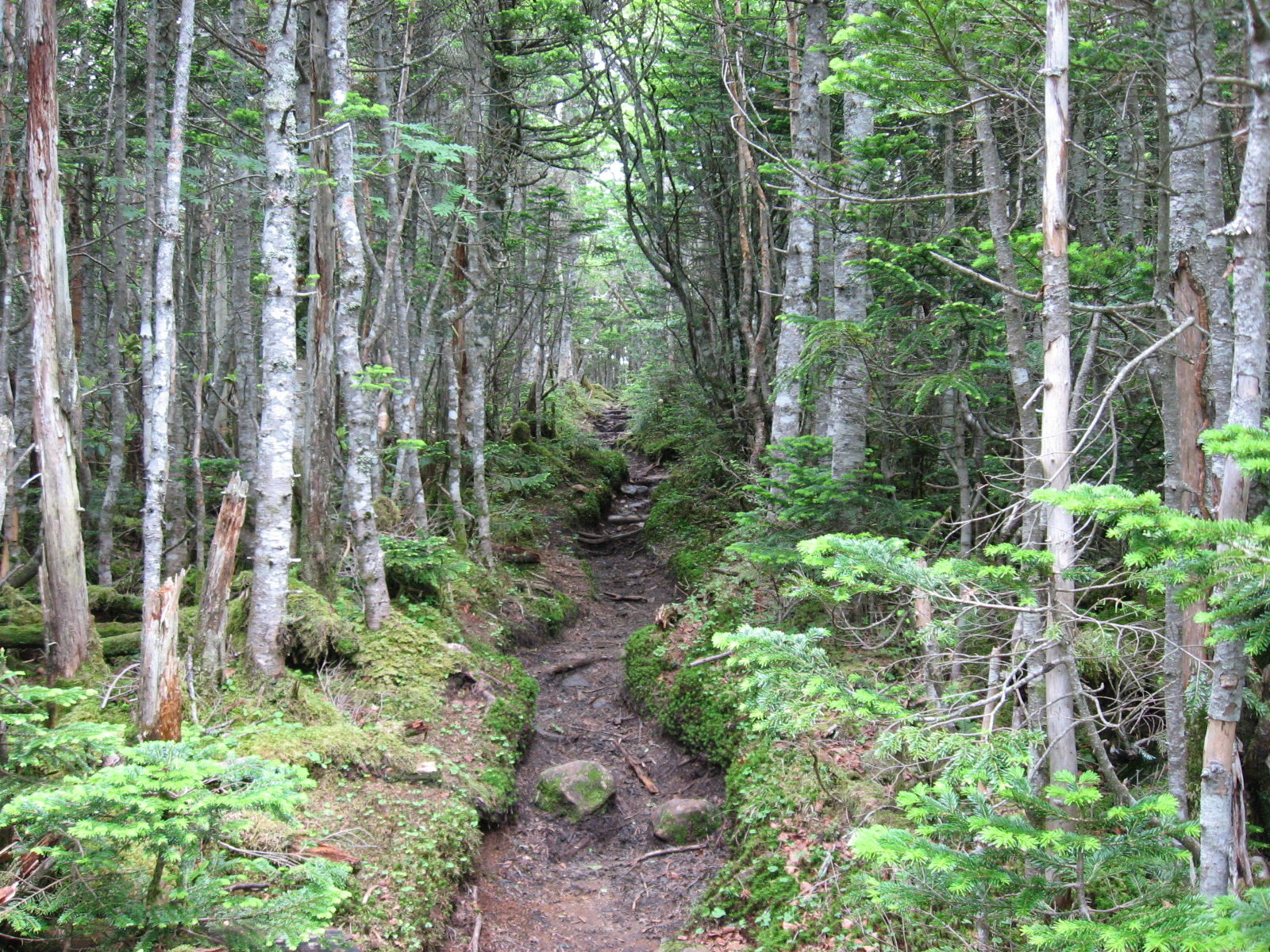
- Forest in the Okuchichibu Mountains

- Ecoregion territory (in purple)

Ecology
- Realm: Palearctic

Geography
- Area: 11,396 km^{2} (4,400 sq mi)
- Countries: Japan

The Honshū alpine conifer forests ecoregion covers 4,400 square miles (11,000 km^{2}) in the high-elevation mountains of central Honshū and the Oshima Peninsula of Hokkaido, Japan. It is a temperate coniferous forest ecoregion in the Palearctic realm.

== Flora ==
Northern Japanese hemlock grow with species of Rhododendron and Menziesia. Maries' fir, Veitch's fir, and Jezo spruce grow in forests with plentiful herbs and ferns in their understories. Sasa grass is very dense in places.

== Fauna ==
Sika deer and Asian black bear inhabit this ecoregion. Significant birds include the rock ptarmigan and the golden eagle.

== See also ==
- List of ecoregions in Japan
