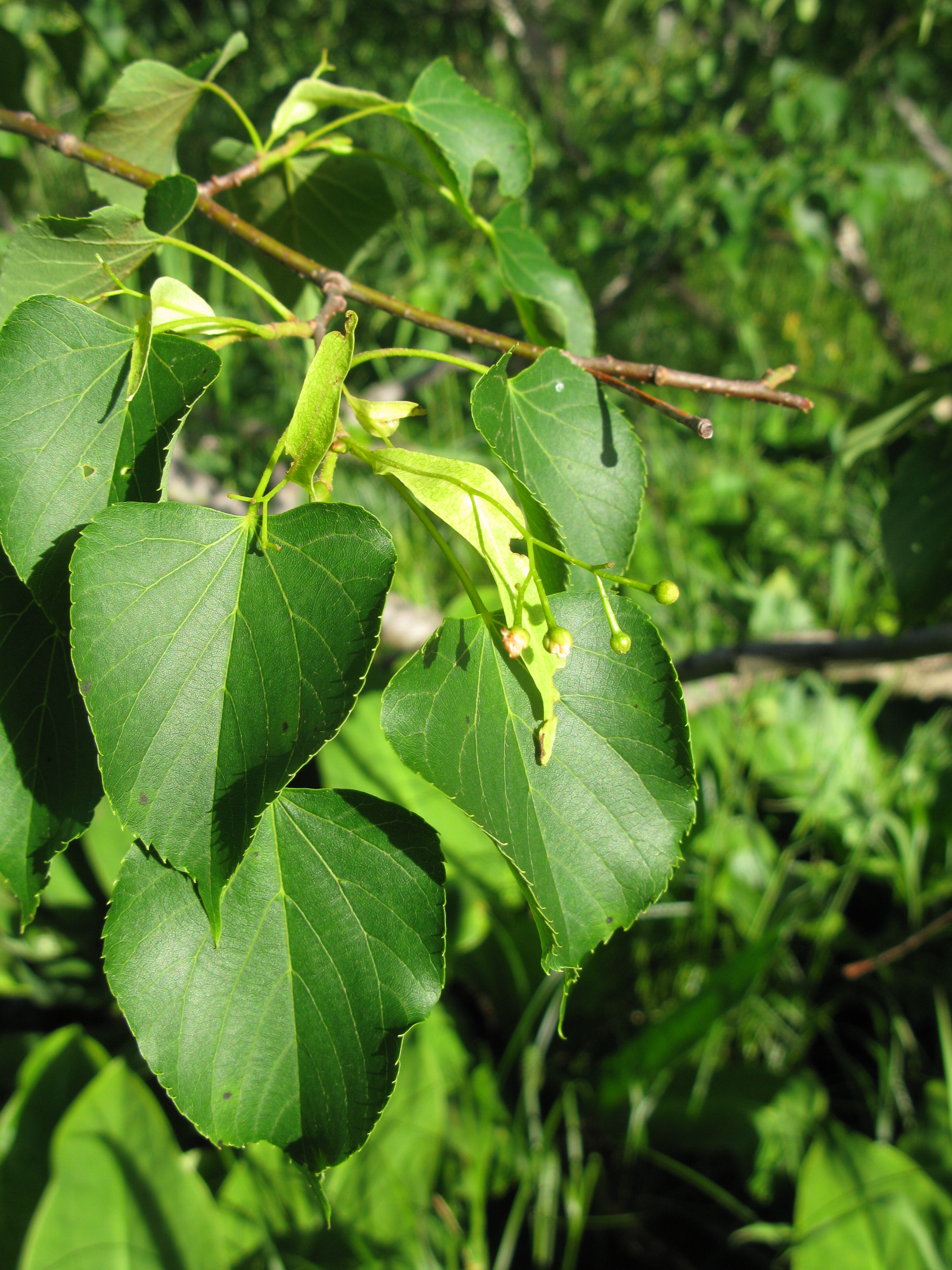

Scientific classification
- Kingdom: Plantae
- Clade: Tracheophytes
- Clade: Angiosperms
- Clade: Eudicots
- Clade: Rosids
- Order: Malvales
- Family: Malvaceae
- Genus: Tilia
- Species: T. japonica

Binomial name
- Tilia japonica (Miq.) Simonk.

Synonyms
- Tilia cordata var. japonica Miq.; Tilia eurosinica Croizat; Tilia ulmifolia var. japonica (Miq.) Sarg.; Tilia ulmifolia var. japonica (Miq.) Sarg. ex Mayr

= Tilia japonica =

Species of tree

Tilia japonica, the Japanese lime or Japanese linden, is a species of Tilia native to eastern China and Japan, preferring to grow in mountains up to 2000 m. It superficially resembles the better-known Tilia cordata, the small-leaved lime, and was originally described as Tilia cordata var. japonica. It differs from T. cordata in having 164 chromosomes instead of 82, and by some subtle differences in leaf and flower morphology. T. japonica inflorescences consistently have 5 staminodes, which is a reliable trait distinguishing it from T. cordata and T. amurensis. Recent studies indicate T.japonica to play an important role in maintaining the ectomycorrhizal networks in local forests it grows in Japan.

== Cultivation and uses ==
Tilia japonica is grown as an ornamental tree. Its 'Ernest Wilson' cultivar has gained the Royal Horticultural Society's Award of Garden Merit. Its wood was used for furniture, and due to its straight grain is still occasionally used for veneers. Like other lindens, it is a source for a premium honey. It is the official tree of the city of Nagano, Japan.

Tilia japonica's innermost bark, known as bast, was used by the Ainu for clothing, attus.
