= Temperate broadleaf and mixed forests =

Biome

Extent of temperate broadleaf and mixed forests

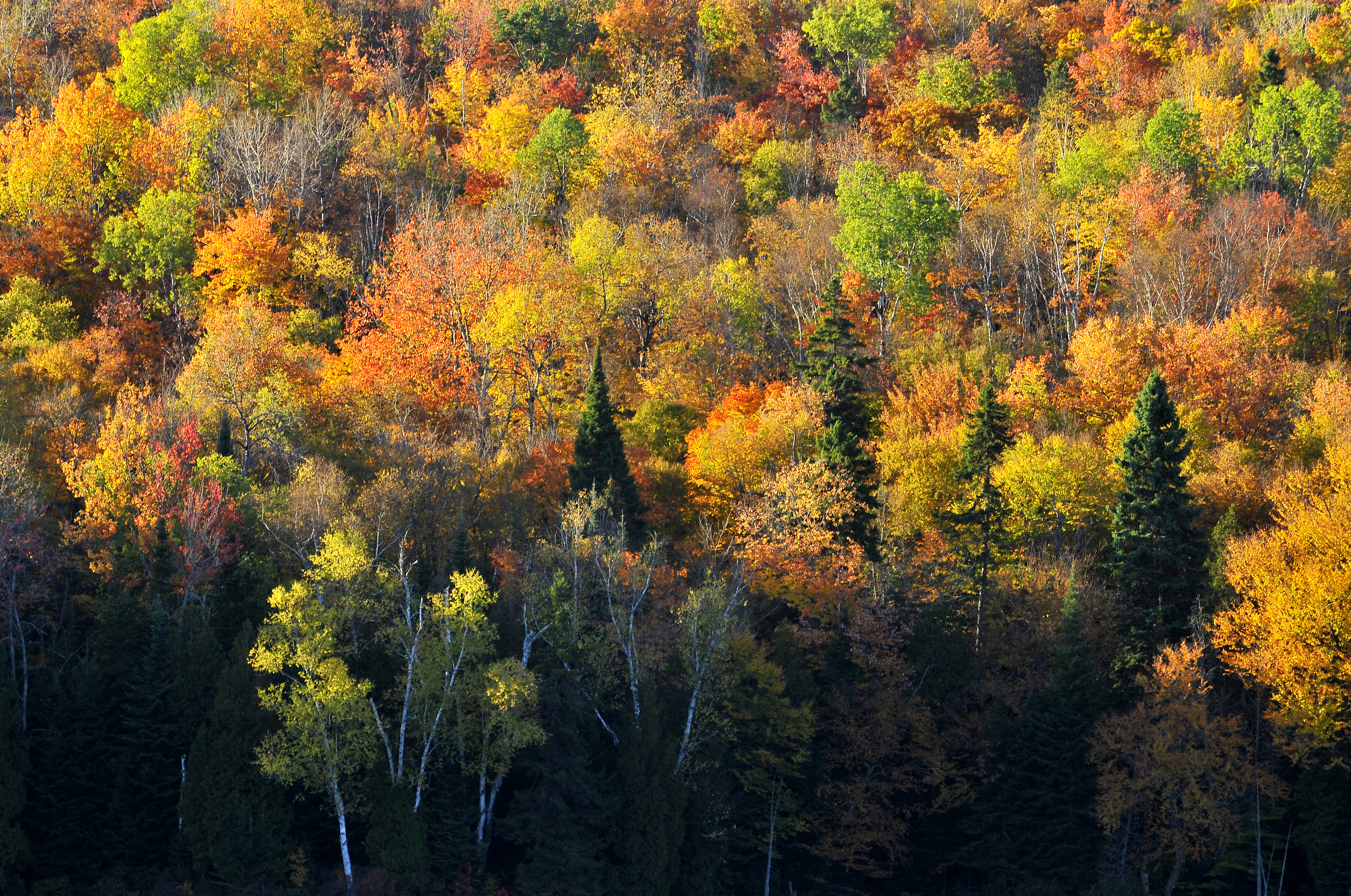
An example of temperate broadleaf and mixed forest in La Mauricie National Park, Quebec.

Temperate broadleaf and mixed forests are a temperate climate terrestrial habitat type defined by the World Wide Fund for Nature, including temperate forest, mixed coniferous forest, and temperate rainforest ecoregions.

These forests are richest and most distinctive in central China and eastern North America, with some other globally distinctive ecoregions in the Himalayas, Western and Central Europe, the southern coast of the Black Sea, Australasia, Southwestern South America and the Russian Far East.

== Ecology ==
The typical structure of these forests includes four layers.

- The uppermost layer is the canopy, composed of tall mature trees ranging from 30 to 61 m (100 to 200 ft) high. Below the canopy is the three-layered, shade-tolerant understory that is roughly 9 to 15 m (30 to 50 ft) shorter than the canopy.
- The top layer of the understory is the sub-canopy composed of smaller mature trees, saplings, and suppressed juvenile canopy layer trees awaiting an opening in the canopy.
- Below the sub-canopy is the shrub layer, composed of low growing woody plants.
- Typically the lowest growing (and most diverse) layer is the ground cover or herbaceous layer.

== Trees ==
In the Northern Hemisphere, characteristic dominant broadleaf trees in this biome include oaks (Quercus spp.), beeches (Fagus spp.), maples (Acer spp.), or birches (Betula spp.). The term "mixed forest" comes from the inclusion of coniferous trees as a canopy component of some of these forests. Typical coniferous trees include pines (Pinus spp.), firs (Abies spp.), and spruces (Picea spp.). In some areas of this biome, the conifers may be a more important canopy species than the broadleaf species. In the Southern Hemisphere, endemic genera such as Nothofagus and Eucalyptus occupy this biome, and most coniferous trees (members of the Araucariaceae and Podocarpaceae) occur in mixtures with broadleaf species, and are classed as broadleaf and mixed forests.

== Climate ==
Temperate broadleaf and mixed forests occur in areas with distinct warm and cool seasons, including climates such as humid continental, humid subtropical, and oceanic, that give them moderate annual average temperatures: 3 to 23 °C (37 to 73 °F). These forests occur in relatively warm and rainy climates, sometimes also with a distinct dry season. A dry season occurs in the winter in East Asia and in summer on the wet fringe of the Mediterranean climate zones. Other areas, such as central eastern North America, have a fairly even distribution of rainfall; annual rainfall is typically over 600 mm (24 in) and often over 1,500 mm (59 in), though it can go as low as 300 mm (12 in) in some parts of the Middle East and close to 6,000 mm (240 in) in the mountains of New Zealand and the Azores. Temperatures are typically moderate except in parts of Asia such as Ussuriland, or the Upper Midwest, where temperate forests can occur despite very harsh conditions with very cold winters.

The climates are typically humid for much of the year, usually appearing in the humid subtropical climate and in the humid continental climate zones to the south of tundra and the generally subarctic taiga. In the Köppen climate classification they are represented respectively by Cfa, Dfa/Dfb southern range and Cfb, and more rarely, Csb, BSk and Csa.

== Ecoregions ==
=== Eurasia ===
Indomalayan temperate broadleaf and mixed forests
Eastern Himalayan broadleaf forests	Bhutan, India, Nepal
Northern Triangle temperate forests	Myanmar
Western Himalayan broadleaf forests	India, Nepal, Pakistan

Palearctic temperate broadleaf and mixed forests
Apennine deciduous montane forests	Italy
Atlantic mixed forests	Denmark, France, Belgium, Germany, Netherlands
Azores temperate mixed forests	Portugal
Balkan mixed forests	Bulgaria, Greece, North Macedonia, Romania, Serbia, Turkey
Baltic mixed forests	Sweden, Denmark, Germany, Poland
Cantabrian mixed forests	Spain, Portugal
Caspian Hyrcanian mixed forests	Iran, Azerbaijan
Caucasus mixed forests	Georgia, Armenia, Azerbaijan, Russia, Turkey, Iran
Celtic broadleaf forests	United Kingdom, Ireland
Central Anatolian deciduous forests	Turkey
Central China loess plateau mixed forests	China
Central European mixed forests	Austria, Germany, Lithuania, Moldova, Poland, Belarus, Czech Republic, Ukraine
Central Korean deciduous forests	North Korea, South Korea
Changbai Mountains mixed forests	China, North Korea
Changjiang Plain evergreen forests	China
Crimean Submediterranean forest complex	Russia, Ukraine
Daba Mountains evergreen forests	China
Dinaric Mountains mixed forests	Albania, Bosnia and Herzegovina, Italy, Montenegro, Serbia, Slovenia, Croatia
East European forest steppe	Bulgaria, Moldova, Romania, Russia, Ukraine
Eastern Anatolian deciduous forests	Turkey
English Lowlands beech forests	United Kingdom
Euxine-Colchic deciduous forests	Bulgaria, Georgia, Turkey
Hokkaido deciduous forests	Japan
Huang He Plain mixed forests	China
Madeira evergreen forests	Portugal
Manchurian mixed forests	China, North Korea, Russia, South Korea
Nihonkai evergreen forests	Japan
Nihonkai montane deciduous forests	Japan
North Atlantic moist mixed forests	Ireland, United Kingdom
Northeast China Plain deciduous forests	China
Pannonian mixed forests	Austria, Bosnia and Herzegovina, Czech Republic, Hungary, Romania, Serbia, Slovakia, Slovenia, Ukraine, Croatia
Po Basin mixed forests	Italy
Pyrenees conifer and mixed forests	France, Spain, Andorra
Qin Ling Mountains deciduous forests	China
Rodope montane mixed forests	Bulgaria, Greece, North Macedonia, Serbia
Sarmatic mixed forests	Russia, Sweden, Norway, Finland, Lithuania, Latvia, Estonia, Belarus
Sichuan Basin evergreen broadleaf forests	China
South Sakhalin-Kurile mixed forests	Russia
Southern Korea evergreen forests	South Korea
Taiheiyo evergreen forests	Japan
Taiheiyo montane deciduous forests	Japan
Tarim Basin deciduous forests and steppe	China
Ussuri broadleaf and mixed forests	Russia
West Siberian broadleaf and mixed forests	Russia
Western European broadleaf forests	Switzerland, Austria, France, Germany, Czech Republic
Zagros Mountains forest steppe	Iran, Iraq, Turkey

== See also ==
- Mixed coniferous forest
- Kuchler plant association system
- Mediterranean forests, woodlands, and scrub
- Temperate deciduous forest
- Trees of the world
