= Nihonkai evergreen forests =

Terrestrial ecoregion in Japan

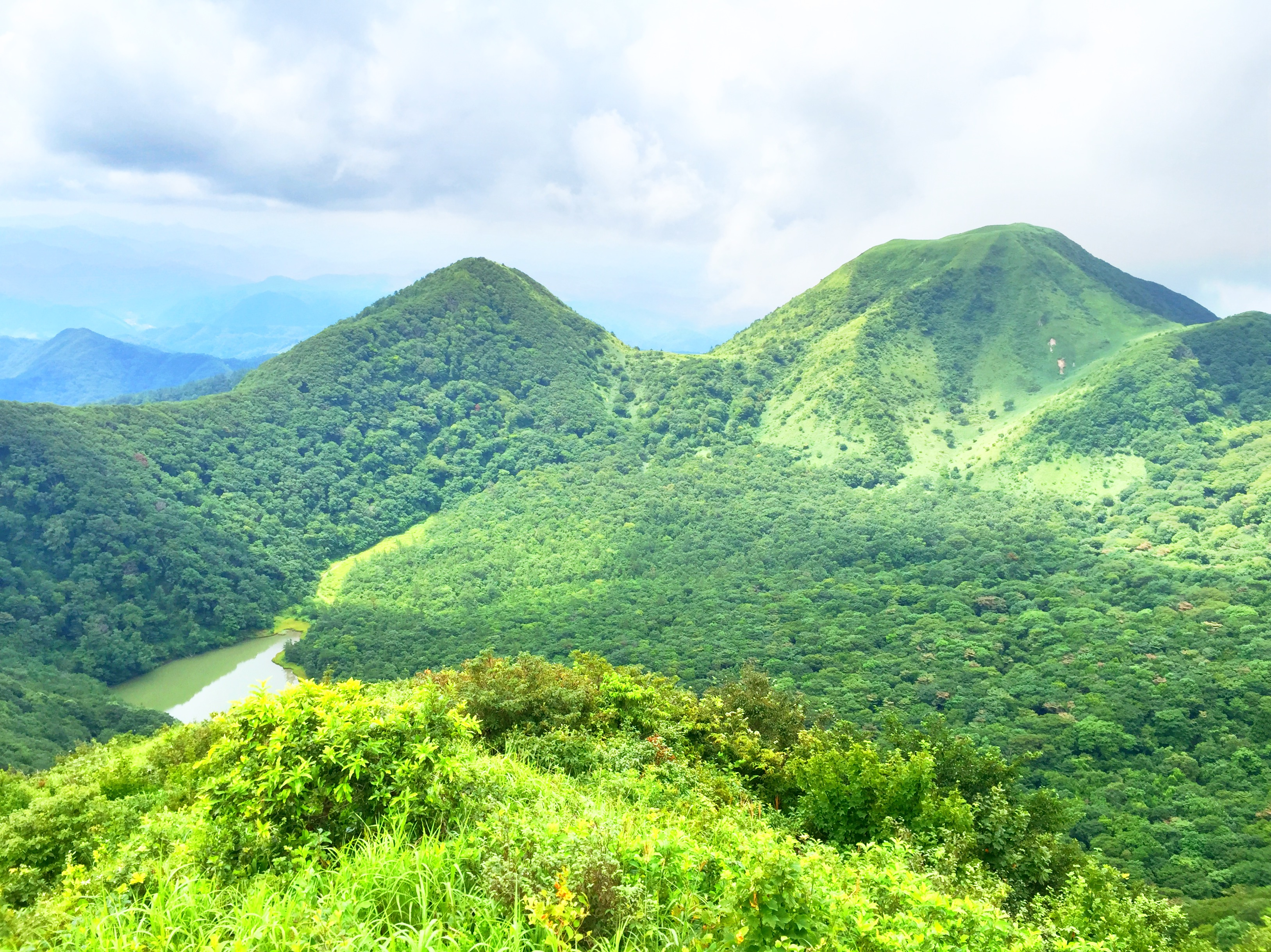
- Mt. Sanbe, near Oda

- Ecoregion territory (in purple)

Ecology
- Realm: Palearctic
- Biome: Temperate broadleaf and mixed forests

Geography
- Area: 21,496 km^{2} (8,300 sq mi)
- Country: Japan
- Coordinates: 35.5°N 133°E

The Nihonkai evergreen forests ecoregion (WWF ID: PA0427) covers a thin strip of land on the western coast (facing the Sea of Japan) of the island of Honshu in Japan. It is bounded on the east by the Nihonkai montane deciduous forests ecoregion.

== Location and description ==
The coastal strips extends for most of the length of the island, encompassing bays, inlets, rocky coasts and caves. Also represented in the ecoregion are the Oki Islands and Sado Island in the Sea of Japan about 40 km west of Honshu.

== Climate ==
The climate of the ecoregion is Humid continental climate, warm wet summer (Köppen climate classification (Cfa)). This climate is characterized by large seasonal temperature differentials. No month averages below 0 °C (32 °F), at least one month averages above 22 °C (72 °F), and four months average over 10 °C (50 °F). Precipitation is relatively even throughout the year.

== Flora and fauna ==
About 37% of the ecoregion is closed evergreen needle-leaf forest, 27% is closed deciduous forest, 11% cultivated, 10% urban/built-up, and the rest is other types of terrain.

== Protected areas ==
- Sanin Kaigan National Park
- Daisen-Oki National Park
