= Hokkaido deciduous forests =

Ecoregion in Hokkaidō, Japan

Hokkaidō deciduous forests
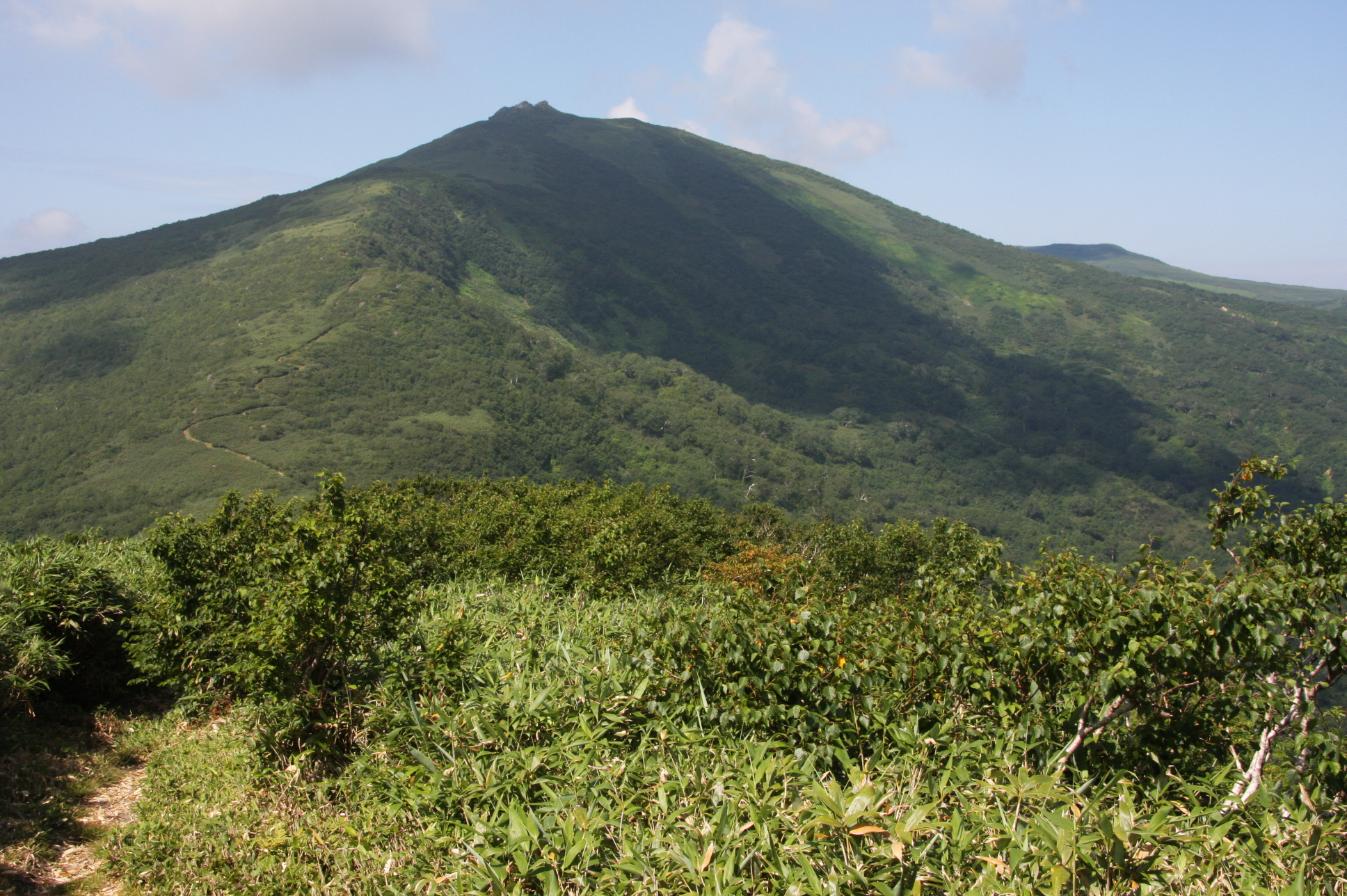
- Mt Mekunnai

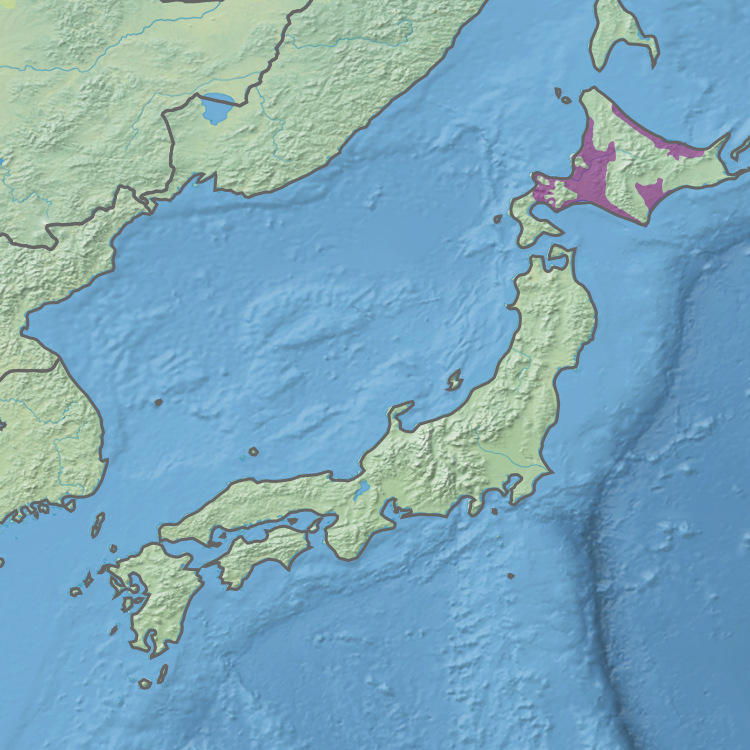
- Ecoregion territory (in purple)

Ecology
- Realm: Palearctic
- Biome: Temperate broadleaf and mixed forests

Geography
- Area: 25,381 km^{2} (9,800 sq mi)
- Country: Japan
- Coordinates: 43.15°N 141.75°E

The Hokkaidō deciduous forests ecoregion (WWF ID: PA0423) covers the northern and southern coasts of the island of Hokkaido, the northernmost of the main islands of Japan. The region sits in the transition zone between the colder subarctic forests to the north and the more temperate forests to the south. Characteristic trees include Mongolian oak, Basswood, and Ash trees.

== Location and description ==
The terrain in the ecoregion is mostly low hills and plains. The west and northern coasts face the colder Sea of Okhotsk. The ecoregion surrounds the Hokkaidō montane conifer forests ecoregion which is at higher altitudes.

== Climate ==
The climate of the ecoregion is Humid continental climate, warm summer (Köppen climate classification (Dfb)). This climate is characterized by large seasonal temperature differentials and a warm summer (at least four months averaging over 10 °C (50 °F), but no month averaging over 22 °C (72 °F). Average annual precipitation is 1,150 mm.

== Flora and fauna ==
Dominant trees of the lowland forests are Mongolian oak (Quercus mongolica), Lime trees (Tilia), and Ash trees (Fraxinus). The main underbrush is Sasa, a form of dwarf bamboo. The ecoregion is generally too cold to support the Japanese beech that is common on Honshu to the south. Biodiversity is relatively low in the area, and there are no endemic species.
