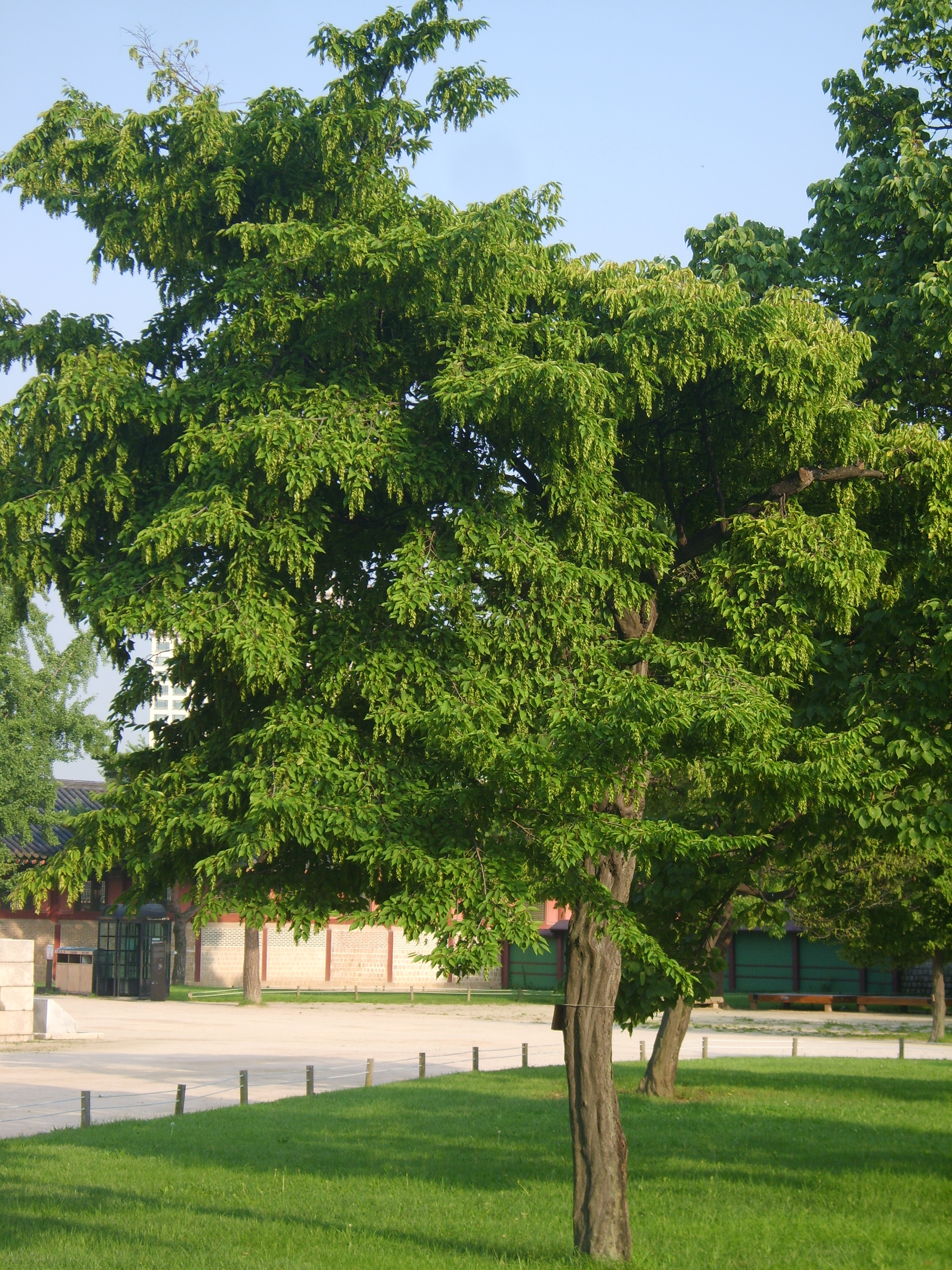
- Habit
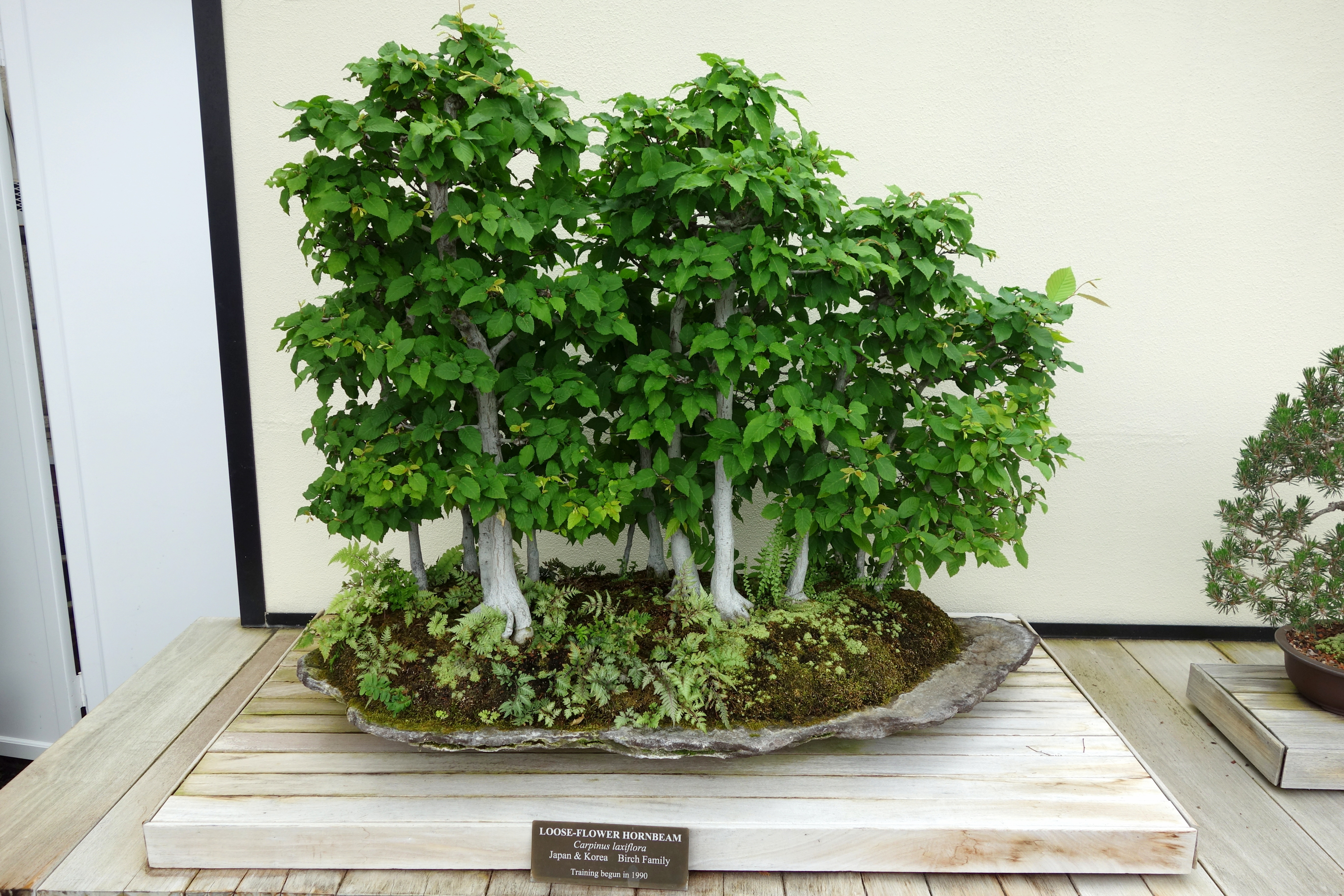
- As bonsai

Conservation status
- Data Deficient (IUCN 3.1)

Scientific classification
- Kingdom: Plantae
- Clade: Embryophytes
- Clade: Tracheophytes
- Clade: Angiosperms
- Clade: Eudicots
- Clade: Rosids
- Order: Fagales
- Family: Betulaceae
- Genus: Carpinus
- Species: C. laxiflora

Binomial name
- Carpinus laxiflora (Siebold & Zucc.) Blume

Synonyms
- List: Carpinus laxiflora var. chartacea H.Lév.; Carpinus laxiflora f. lacera Hayashi; Carpinus laxiflora var. longispica Uyeki; Carpinus laxiflora var. macrophylla Nakai; Carpinus laxiflora f. macrophylla (Nakai) W.Lee; Carpinus laxiflora var. macrothyrsa Koidz.; Carpinus laxiflora f. pendula (Miyoshi) Sugim.; Carpinus laxiflora var. pendula Miyoshi; Distegocarpus laxiflora Siebold & Zucc.

= Carpinus laxiflora =

Species of plant

Carpinus laxiflora, the aka-shide, loose-flower hornbeam, or loose-flowered hornbeam, is a species of flowering plant in the family Betulaceae, native to the Korean Peninsula, and Japan. A deciduous tree of mountain forests, and typically 10 to 15 m (33 to 49 ft) tall, it is used in bonsai, and rarely as a park or street tree. It is available from commercial suppliers. In addition to the rather rustic unimproved species, a weeping form called 'Pendula', and a sport with variegated leaves called 'Variegata' are available.

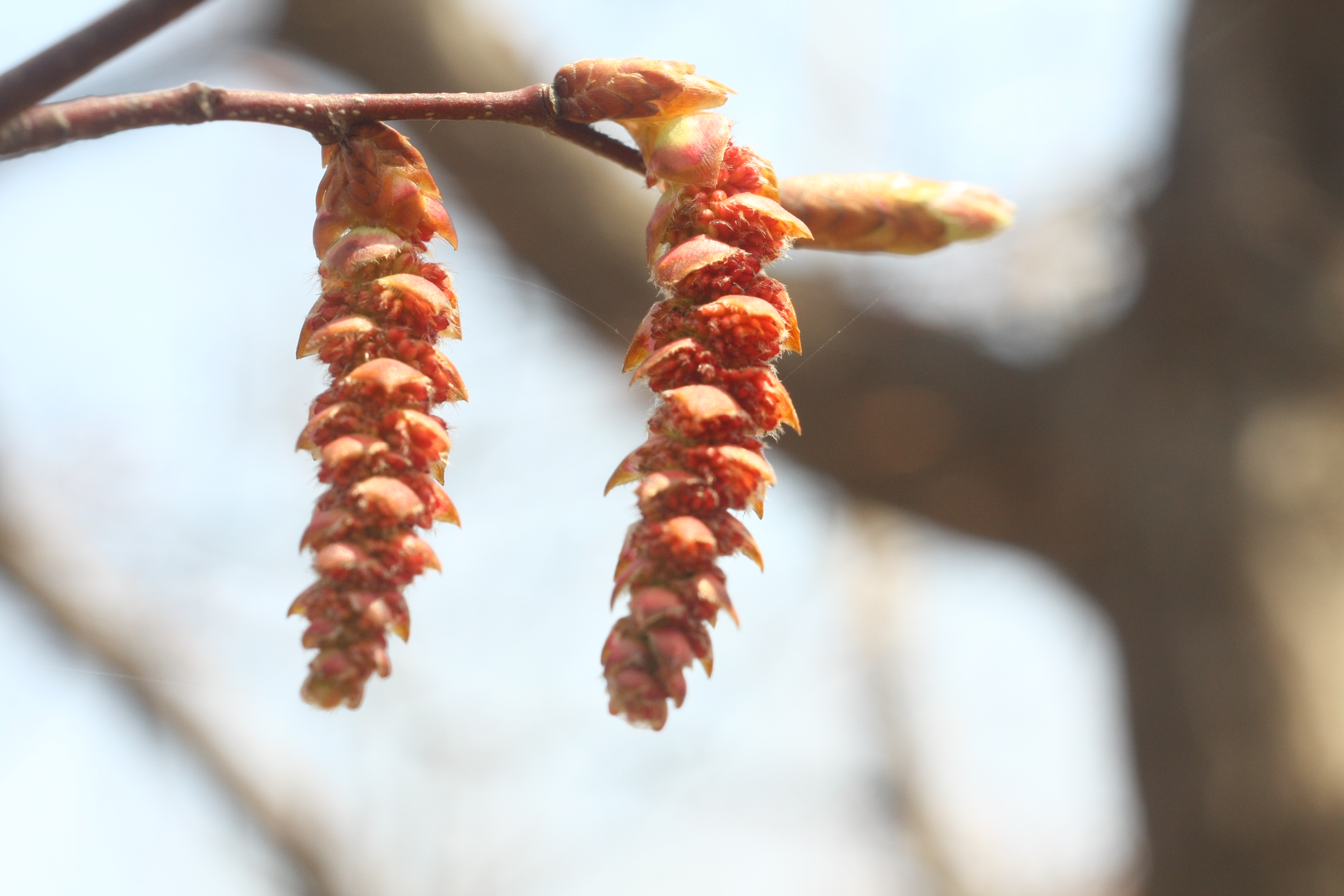
Flowers are lax

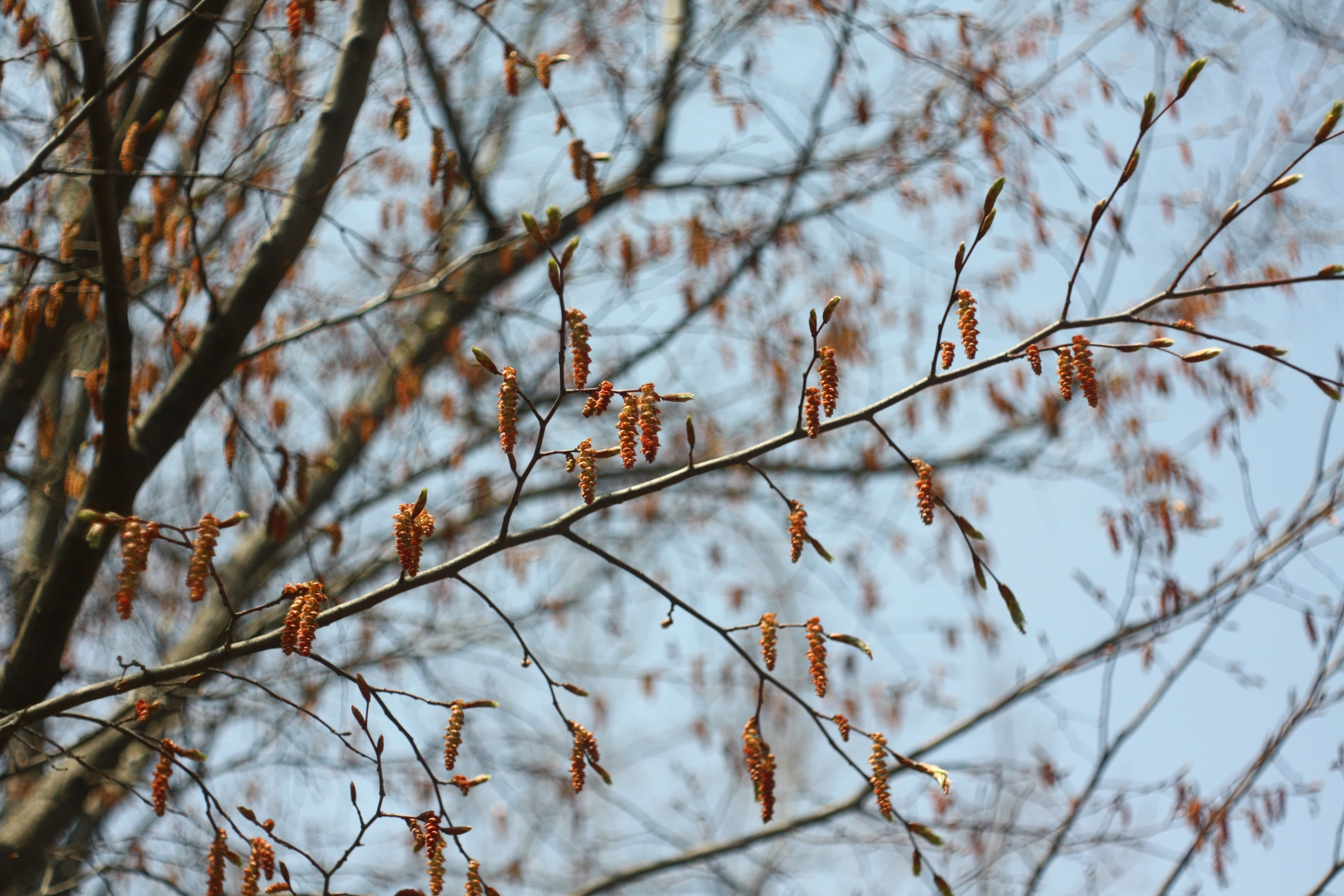
Flowers emerge before leaves

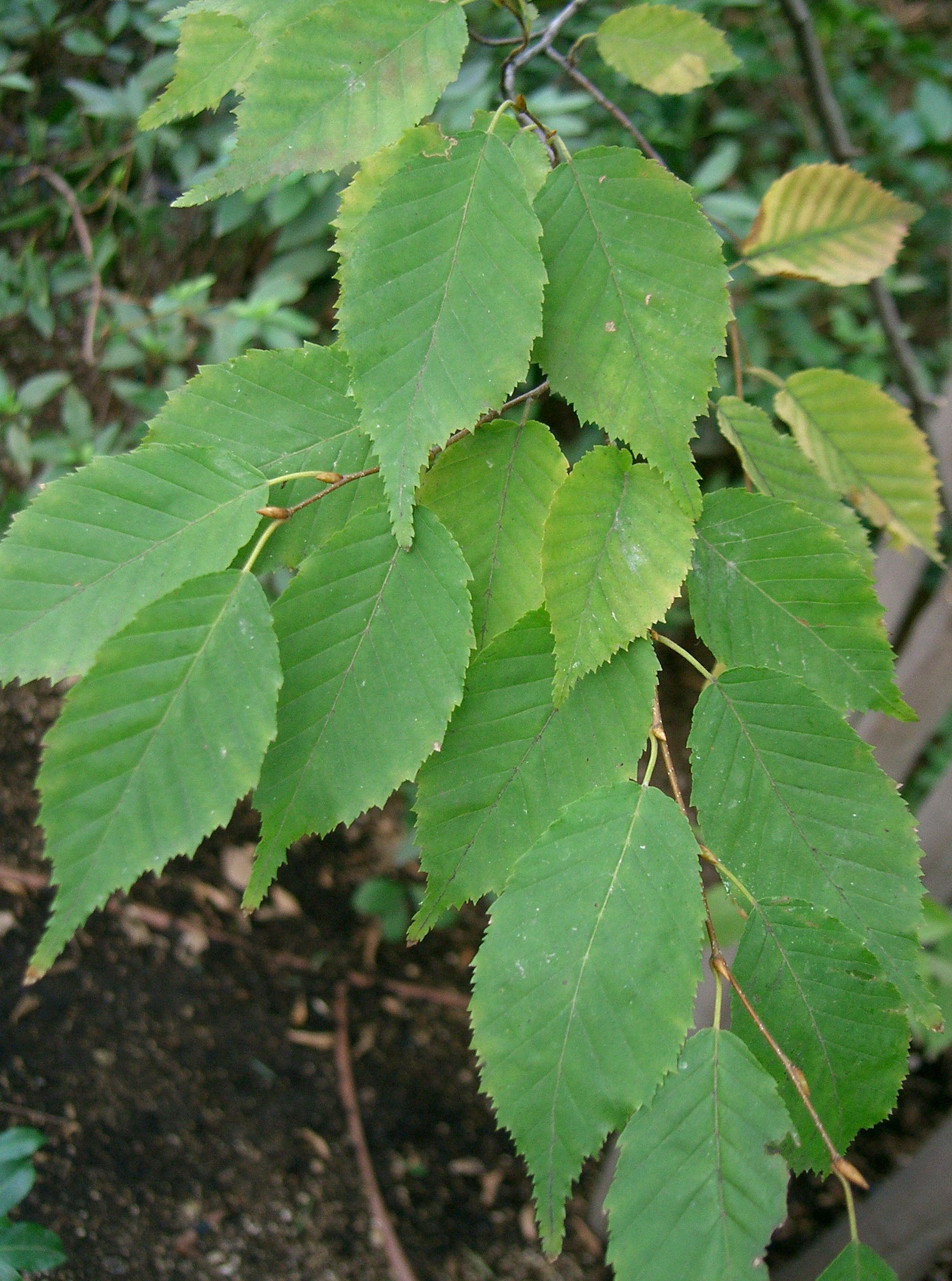
Leaves

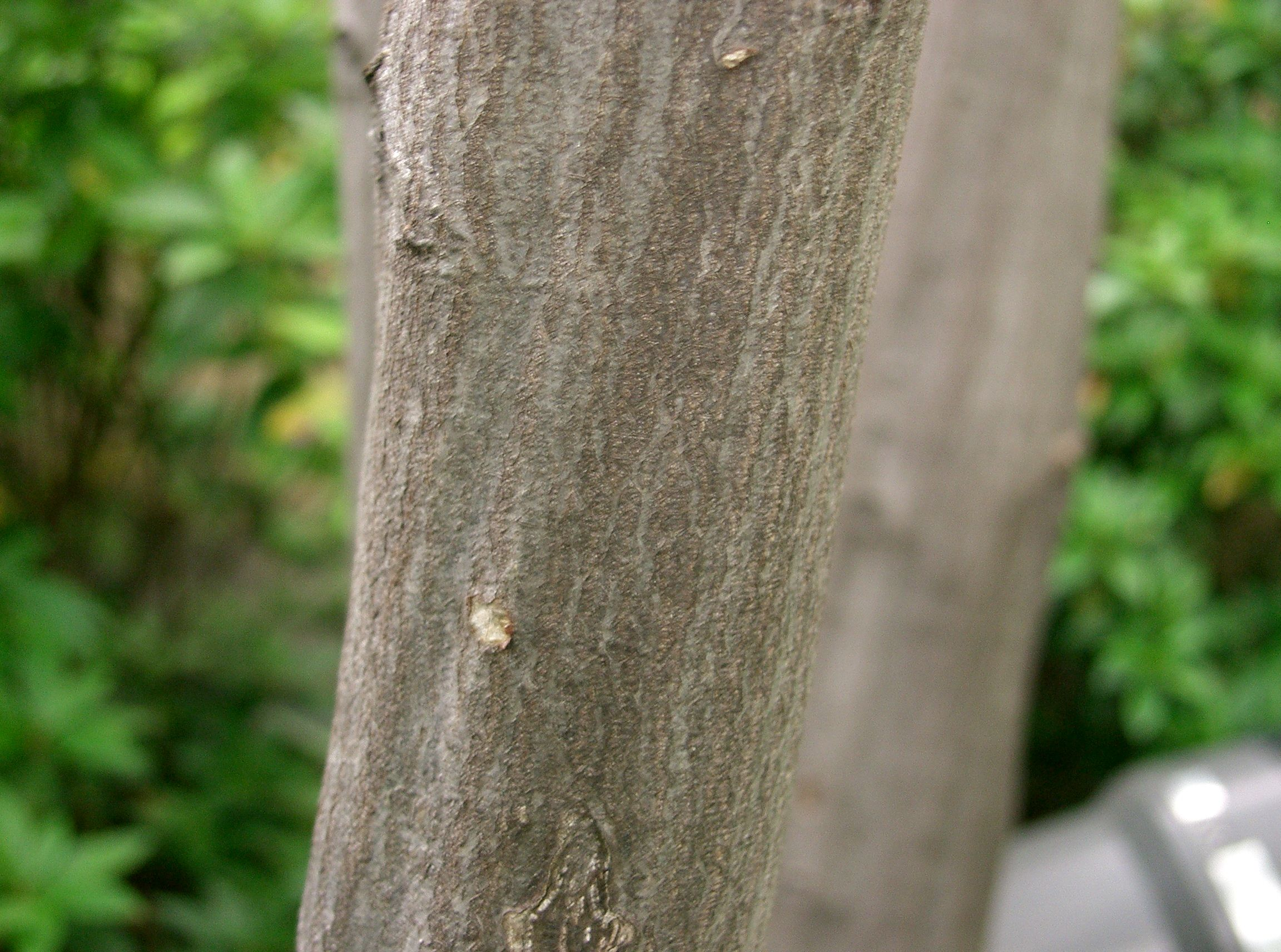
Bark

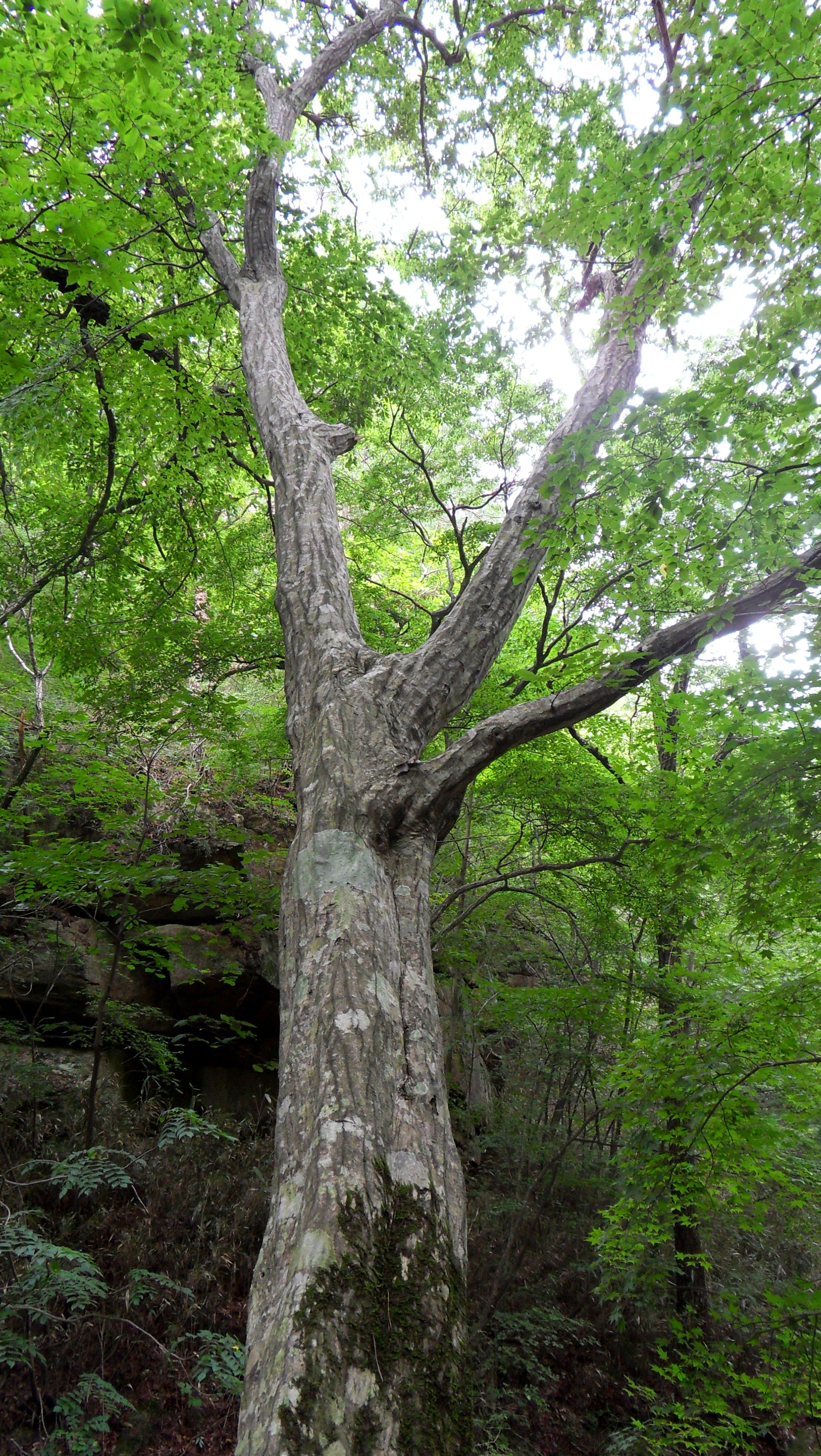
Bole

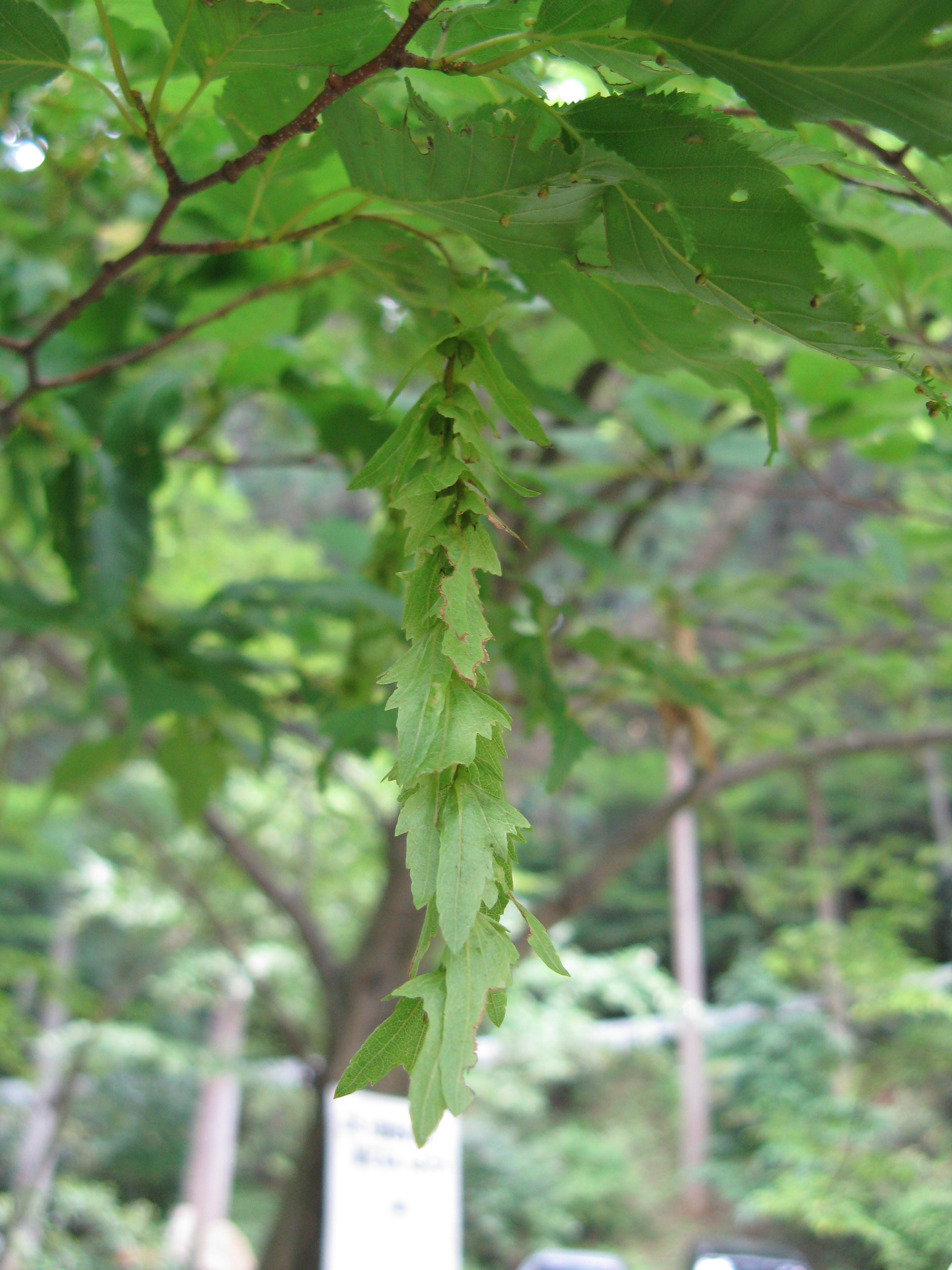
Unripe seed propagules

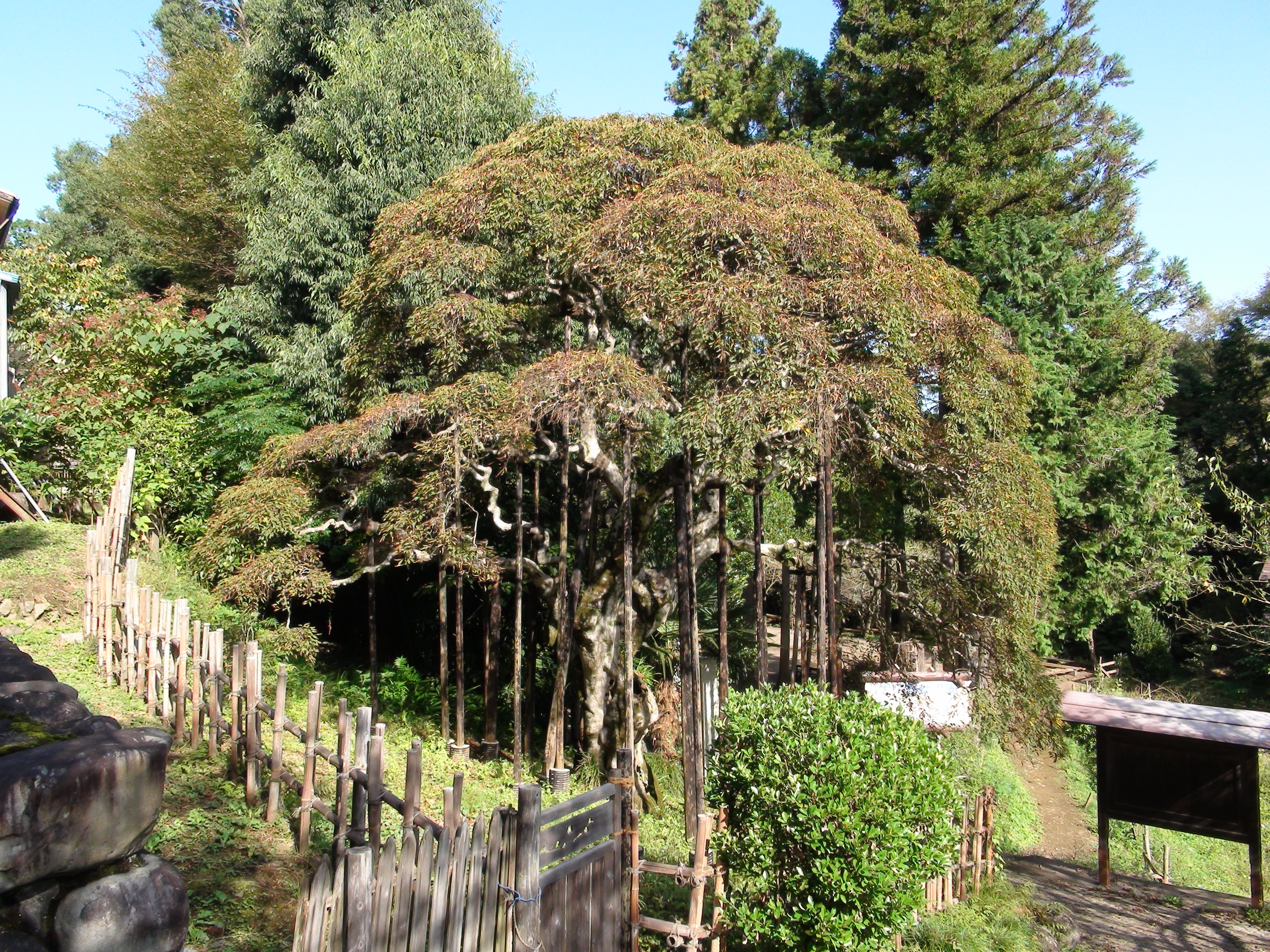
A weeping individual designated a Natural Monument of Japan
