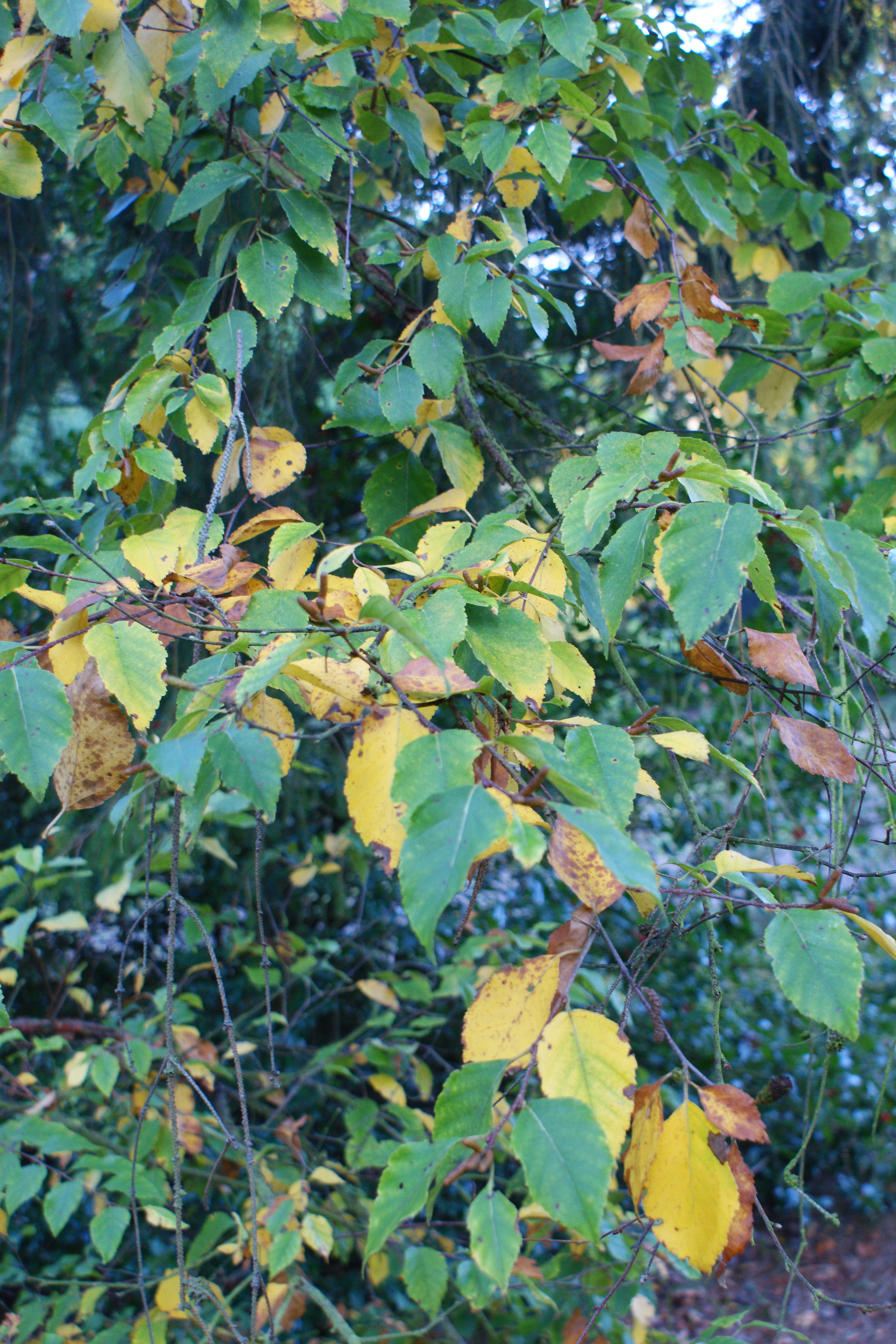

Conservation status
- Least Concern (IUCN 3.1)

Scientific classification
- Kingdom: Plantae
- Clade: Embryophytes
- Clade: Tracheophytes
- Clade: Angiosperms
- Clade: Eudicots
- Clade: Rosids
- Order: Fagales
- Family: Betulaceae
- Genus: Betula
- Species: B. davurica

Binomial name
- Betula davurica Pall.

Varieties
- Betula davurica var. davurica; Betula davurica var. okuboi Miyabe & Tatew.; Betula davurica var. parvifolia Ashburner & McAll.

Synonyms
- Betula dahurica Pall., orth. var.; Betula davurica var. typica Regel

= Betula davurica =

Species of plant

Betula davurica (lit. 'Daur birch'), Dahurian birch, or Asian black birch (Chinese: 黑桦; pinyin: hēihuà), is a species of birch which is native to China, Japan, Korea, eastern Mongolia, and Russian Far East. It was introduced to the United Kingdom and also grows at the Arnold Arboretum in Boston. In Japan, it usually grows in Nobeyama in Nagano Prefecture in the island of Honshu where it is considered to be endangered. Small population of them can also be found on Hokkaido and Kuril Islands.

== Description ==
The species is 20 metres (66 ft) tall with black coloured bark and either reddish-brown or dark brown coloured branches which are also shiny and glabrous. Petiole is 0.5–1.5 centimetres (0.20–0.59 in) with leaf blades being ovate, elliptic, rhombic and 3.5–5 centimetres (1.4–2.0 in). Females have an erect or pendulous inflorescence which have 5–12 millimetres (0.20–0.47 in) long peduncle. The bracts are 5–6 millimetres (0.20–0.24 in) long and is lanceolate. The species also have an elliptic and hairless nutlet which have membranous wings. Flowers bloom from June to July while fruits are from July to August.
