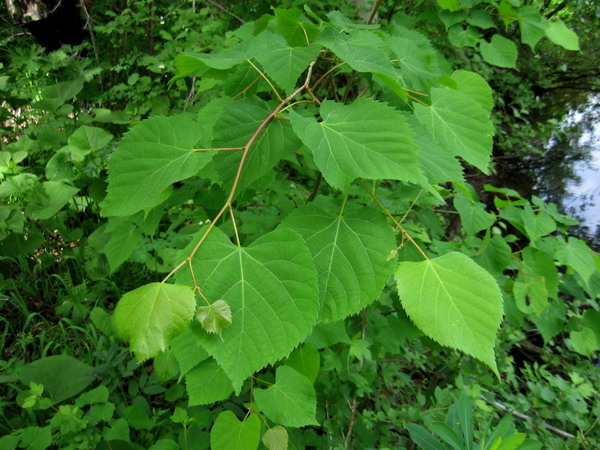
- Foliage

Scientific classification
- Kingdom: Plantae
- Clade: Tracheophytes
- Clade: Angiosperms
- Clade: Eudicots
- Clade: Rosids
- Order: Malvales
- Family: Malvaceae
- Genus: Tilia
- Species: T. amurensis

Binomial name
- Tilia amurensis Rupr.

Synonyms
- Tilia amurensis subsp. taquetii (C.K.Schneid.) Pigott; Tilia divaricata I.V.Vassil.; Tilia glabrata Nakai; Tilia insularis Nakai; Tilia koreana Nakai; Tilia rufa Nakai; Tilia taishanensis S.B.Liang; Tilia taquetii C.K.Schneid.

= Tilia amurensis =

Species of tree

Tilia amurensis, commonly known as the Amur lime or Amur linden, is a species of Tilia native to eastern Asia. It differs from the better-known Tilia cordata in having somewhat smaller leaves, bracts, and cymes. It is an important timber tree in Russia, China, and Korea, and is occasionally planted as a street tree in cities with colder climates.

== Description ==
Tilia amurensis is a medium-sized shade tree that can grow up to 30 m (98 ft) tall. Its appearance is quite similar to Tilia japonica besides the difference in size of leaves and bracts and a shorter cyme. T. amurensis is a hermaphrodite, which means the flower contains both female and male organs, and is mainly pollinated by insects.

== Habitat ==
Tilia amurensis prefers a medium moisture level and fertile, well drained, loamy soil. It has the ability to adapt to several different ranges of soil conditions, as well as a good tolerance for urban conditions. It is often found in mixed forests across China, North Korea, South Korea, Russia, and north-east Siberia.

== Life cycle ==
The leaves of the tree tend to begin to emerge around late spring to early June. In areas with clement winters, the tree is known for badly frosting after emerging early. Its lifespan is generally around 50 years, with many going on to live much longer in situations where they are maintained well and kept free of disease.

== Development ==
Tilia amurensis has a dark bark color, with irregular scaled ridges that become more apparent as it matures. The twigs measure (1.3-2.6 mm thick). Primarily, they start with tangled stellate indumentum, which becomes glabrous as they mature. The buds are smooth, with two exposed scales. The leaves tend to measure 4-8 x 4–7 cm and are orbicular alongside a long, skinny tip with a cordata base. The lower bases of the leaves are pale green with a loose stellate indumentum and strong tufts with red hair under the vein axils. The teeth with micronate tips can grow up to 1.2 mm long, with the floral bracts growing to 4–10 cm x 0.5-1.5 cm. The leaves are rather droopy with 10-30 flowers on each pedicel.

== Medicine ==
Tea can be made from the leaves, which has an antispasmodic, diaphoretic, and sedative effect.

== Food ==
Tilia amurensis is not commonly used as a supplement for food. The leaves are edible, but it is known as a famine food, only to be consumed if no better options exist. A substitute for chocolate can be made from a paste of its ground fruits and flowers. This has not become a popular product due to the paste decomposing very easily and rapidly.
