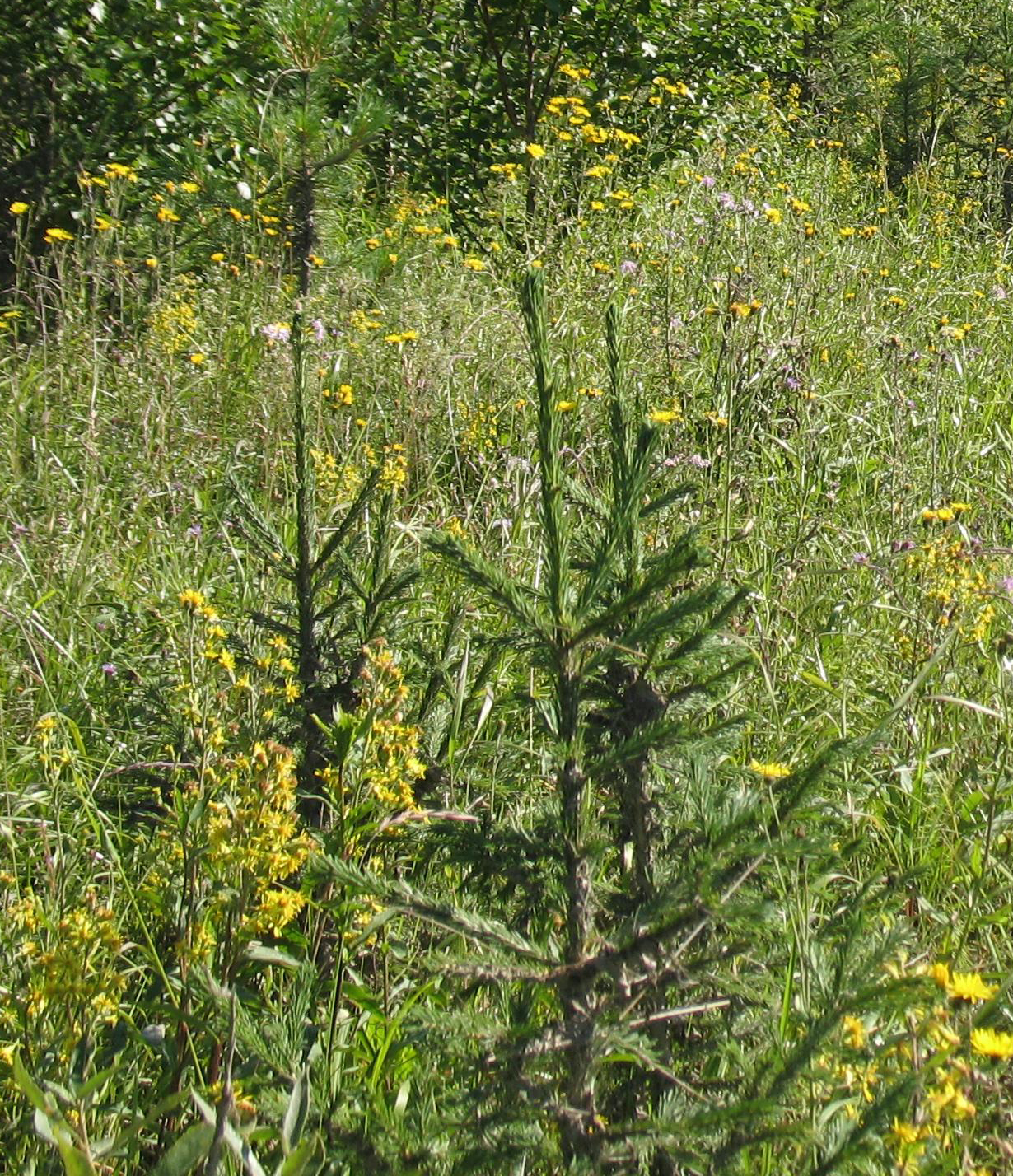
- Young Siberian spruce trees, Khanty–Mansi Autonomous Okrug (Russia)

Conservation status
- Least Concern (IUCN 3.1)

Scientific classification
- Kingdom: Plantae
- Clade: Embryophytes
- Clade: Tracheophytes
- Clade: Gymnosperms
- Division: Pinophyta
- Class: Pinopsida
- Order: Pinales
- Family: Pinaceae
- Genus: Picea
- Species: P. obovata

Binomial name
- Picea obovata Ledeb.

Synonyms
- Picea abies subsp. obovata (Ledeb.) Hultén; Picea excelsa var. altaica Tepl.; Picea obovata var. coerulea Tigerstedt; Picea obovata var. argentea Luchnik; Picea obovata var. krylovii Luchnik; Picea obovata var. lucifera Luchnik; Picea obovata var. lutescens Luchnik; Picea obovata var. pendula Luchnik; Picea obovata var. seminskiensis Luchnik; Picea obovata var. tschiketamanica Luchnik

= Picea obovata =

Siberian spruce

Species of conifer

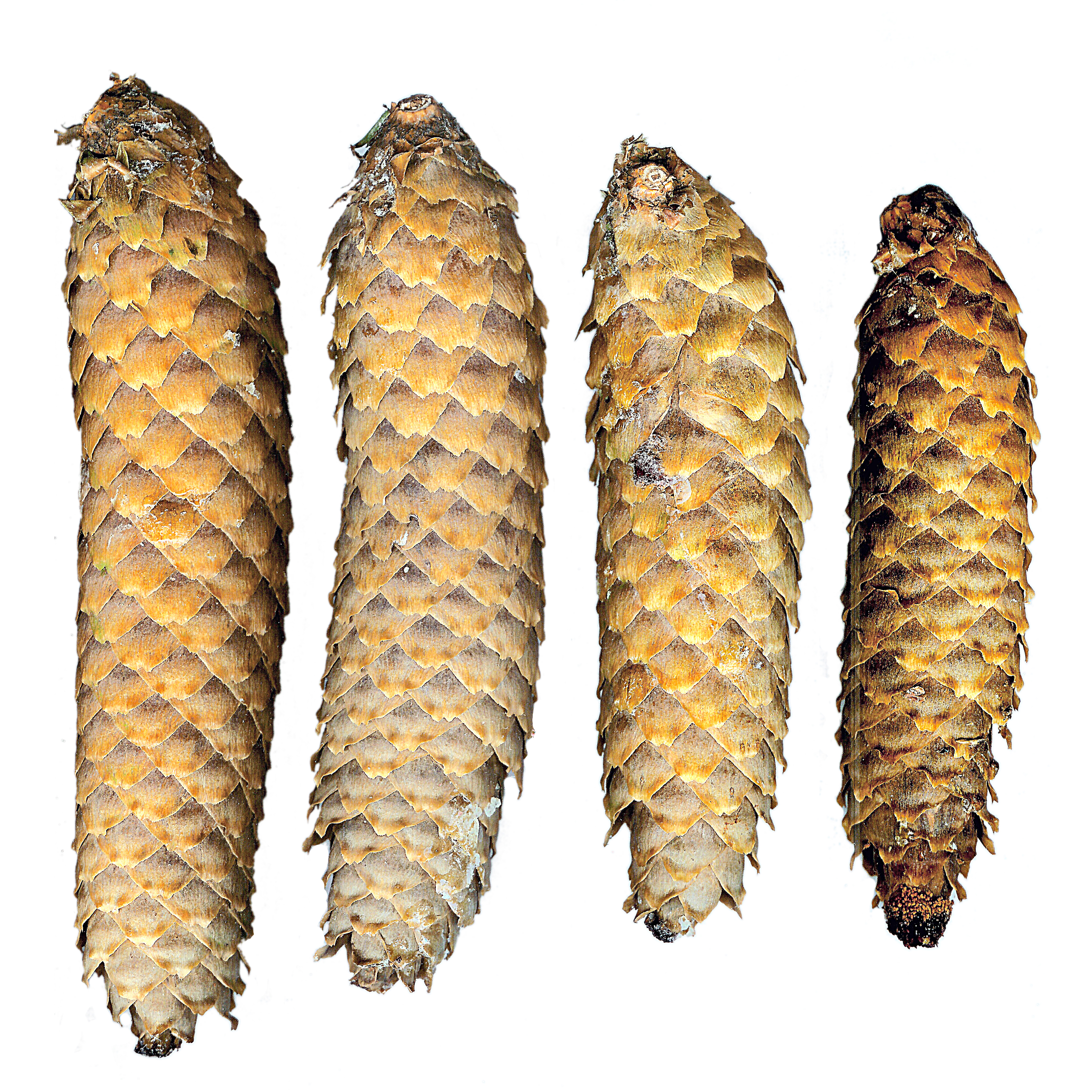
P. abies

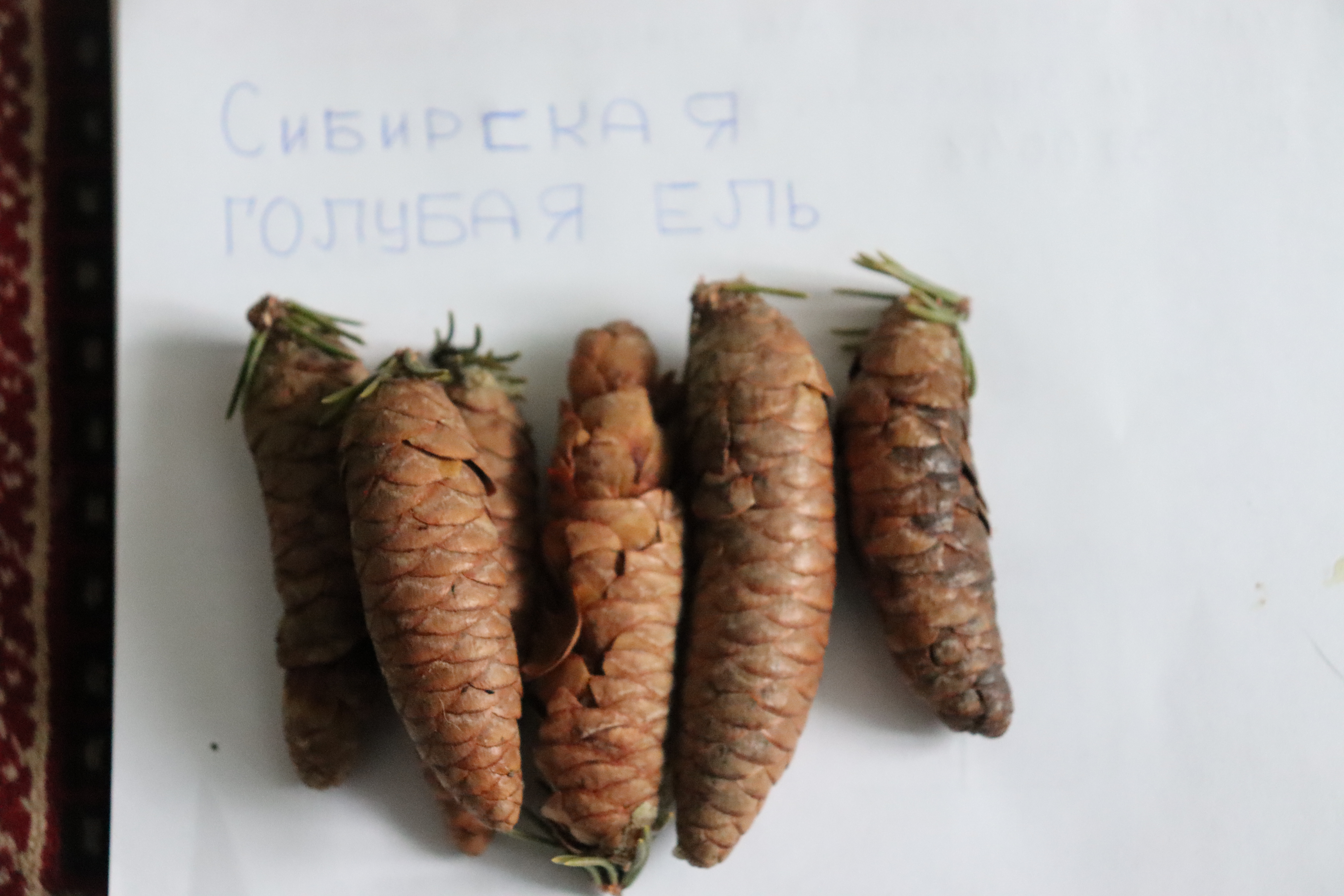
P. obovata

Comparison of cones

Picea obovata, the Siberian spruce, is a spruce native to Siberia, from the Ural Mountains east to Magadan Oblast, and from the Arctic tree line south to the Altay Mountains in northwestern Mongolia.

It is a medium-sized evergreen tree growing to 15–35 m tall, and with a trunk diameter of up to 1.5 m, and a conical crown with drooping branchlets. The shoots are orange-brown, with variably scattered to dense pubescence. The leaves are needle-like, 1–2 cm long, rhombic in cross-section, shiny green to grayish-green with inconspicuous stomatal lines; the leaves subtending a bud are distinctively angled out at a greater angle than the rest of the leaves (a character shared by only two or three other spruces). The cones are cylindric-conic, 5–10 cm long and 1.5–2 cm broad, green or purple, maturing glossy brown 4–6 months after pollination, and have stiff, smoothly rounded scales. The specific name obovata means "egg-shaped."

It is an important timber tree in Russia, the wood being used for general construction and paper making. The leaves are used to make spruce beer.

Siberian spruce cone-scales are used as food by the caterpillars of the tortrix moth Cydia illutana.

Due to their hardness and flexibility, planks made from untreated siberian spruce are the material of choice for the surfaces of modern world-class velodromes.

== Taxonomy and systematics ==
Siberian spruce and Norway spruce (Picea abies) have turned out to be extremely similar genetically and might be considered two closely related subspecies of P. abies.

Siberian spruce hybridises extensively with Norway spruce where the two species (or subspecies) meet in northeastern Europe; trees over a broad area from extreme northeast Norway and Sweden, northern Finland east to the Ural Mountains are classified as the hybrid Picea × fennica (Regel) Komarov (or P. abies subsp. ×fennica, if the two taxa are considered subspecies); they differ from typical P. obovata from east of the Urals in having cones with less smoothly rounded, often triangular-pointed, scales.
