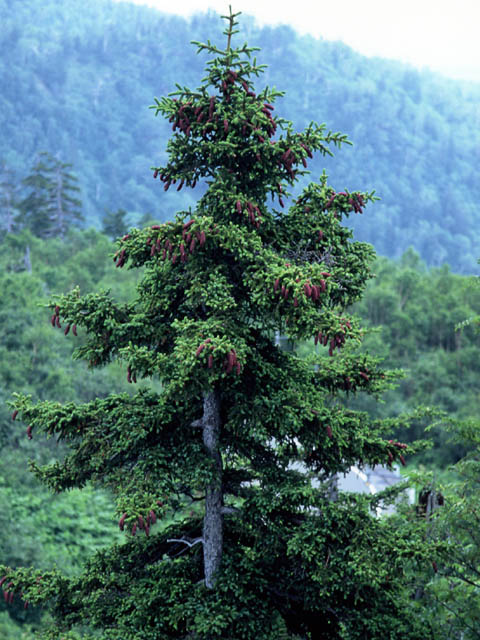

Conservation status
- Least Concern (IUCN 3.1)

Scientific classification
- Kingdom: Plantae
- Clade: Tracheophytes
- Clade: Gymnospermae
- Division: Pinophyta
- Class: Pinopsida
- Order: Pinales
- Family: Pinaceae
- Genus: Picea
- Species: P. jezoensis

Binomial name
- Picea jezoensis (Siebold & Zucc.) Carr.

= Picea jezoensis =

Ezo spruce

Species of conifer

Picea jezoensis (sometimes misspelled Picea yezoensis), the dark-bark spruce, Ezo spruce, Yezo spruce, or Jezo spruce, is a large evergreen tree growing to 30–50 m tall and with a trunk diameter of up to 2 m. It is native to northeast Asia, from the mountains of central Japan and the Changbai Mountains on the China-North Korea border, north to eastern Siberia, including the Sikhote-Alin, Kuril Islands, Sakhalin and Kamchatka. It is found in cold but humid temperate rain forests, and nowhere does its range extend more than 400 km from the Pacific Ocean. The specific epithet jezoensis derives from Ezo, an old name for Hokkaido and other islands north of the Japanese island of Honshu, where the species is found.

The bark is thin and scaly, becoming fissured in old trees. The crown is broad conic. The shoots are pale buff-brown, glabrous (hairless) but with prominent pulvini. The leaves are needle-like, 15–20 mm long, 2 mm broad, flattened in cross-section, dark green above with no stomata, and blue-white to white below with two dense bands of stomata.

The cones are pendulous, slender cylindrical, 4–7 cm long and 2 cm broad when closed, opening to 3 cm broad. They have thin, flexible scales 12–18 mm long. They are green or reddish, maturing pale brown 5–6 months after pollination. The seeds are black, 3 mm long, with a slender, 6–8 mm long pale brown wing.

There are two geographical subspecies, treated as varieties by some authors, and as distinct species by others:

- Picea jezoensis subsp. jezoensis (Ezo spruce). All of the range except as below, south to Hokkaidō, Japan. Shoots very pale buff-brown, almost white; stomatal bands blue-white; cones pale brown with flexible scales.
- Picea jezoensis subsp. hondoensis (Mayr) P. A. Schmidt (Hondo spruce). An isolated southern population on high mountains in central Honshū, Japan. Shoots buff-brown to orange-brown, less often very pale; stomatal bands bright white; cones orange-brown with stiffer scales.

Ezo spruce is very closely related to Sitka spruce (Picea sitchensis), which replaces it on the opposite side of the north Pacific. They, particularly subsp. jezoensis, can be difficult to distinguish, with the absence of stomata on the upper surface of the leaves of P. jezoensis being the best feature. Its leaves are also somewhat blunter, less sharply spine-tipped, than Sitka Spruce.

== Usage ==
Jezo spruce is important in the Russian Far East and northern Japan, for timber and paper production. Much of what is cut is harvested unsustainably (and often illegally) from pristine natural forests.

It is also occasionally planted as an ornamental tree in large gardens.

The Ainu string instrument called tonkori has a body made from Jezo Spruce.
