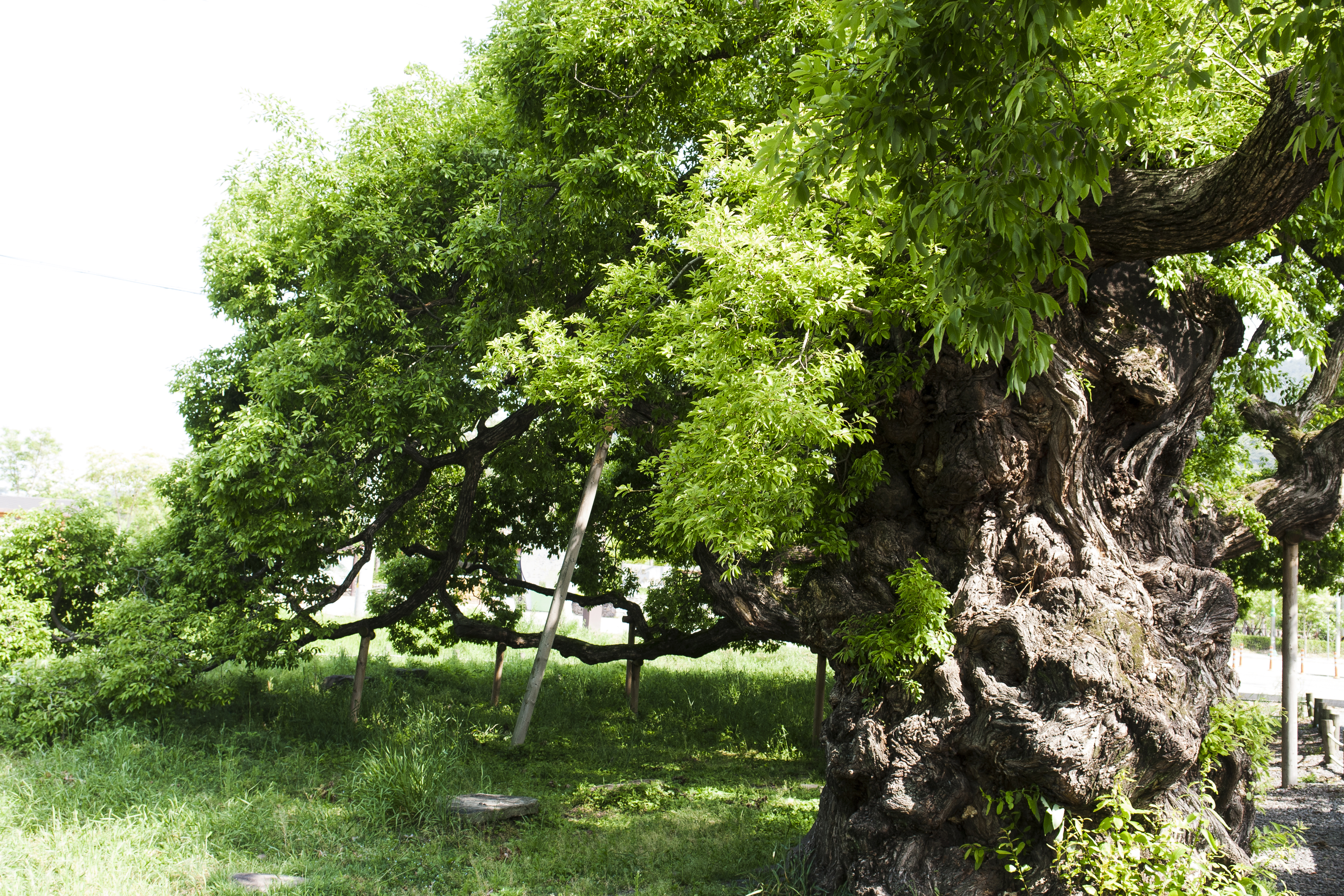
- Here given as Salix koreensis

Conservation status
- Least Concern (IUCN 3.1)

Scientific classification
- Kingdom: Plantae
- Clade: Embryophytes
- Clade: Tracheophytes
- Clade: Spermatophytes
- Clade: Angiosperms
- Clade: Eudicots
- Clade: Rosids
- Order: Malpighiales
- Family: Salicaceae
- Genus: Salix
- Species: S. pierotii

Binomial name
- Salix pierotii Miq.

Synonyms
- List: Salix dolichostyla Seemen; Salix dolichostyla subsp. serissifolia (Kimura) H.Ohashi & H.Nakai; Salix eriocarpa Franch. & Sav.; Salix feddei H.Lév.; Salix hirosakensis Koidz.; Salix hondoensis Koidz.; Salix jessoensis Seemen; Salix jessoensis subsp. serissifolia (Kimura) H.Ohashi; Salix koreensis Andersson; Salix koreensis var. pedunculata Y.L.Chou; Salix koreensis var. shandongensis C.F.Fang; Salix mixta Korsh.; Salix pogonandra H.Lév.; Salix pseudojessoensis H.Lév.; Salix pseudokoreensis Koidz.; Salix pseudoyoshinoi Koidz.; Salix serissifolia Kimura; Salix serissifolia f. pendula Okuhara ex T.Shimizu; Salix yoshinoi Koidz.

= Salix pierotii =

Species of plant

Salix pierotii, the Korean willow, is a species of willow native to northeast China, far eastern Russia, the Korean peninsula and Japan. They are shrubs or trees reaching 8 m (26 ft). Because their twisted wood is not good for timber or making tools, in Japan Salix pierotii trees are used to demarcate property lines between farms.

== Forms ==
One form is currently accepted:

- Salix pierotii f. auricomans Kimura
