= List of ecoregions in China =

The following is a list of terrestrial ecoregions of the People's Republic of China and the Republic of China, according to the World Wide Fund for Nature.

The transition between two of the planet's eight terrestrial biogeographic realms – the Palearctic, which includes temperate and boreal Eurasia, and Indomalaya, which includes tropical South and Southeast Asia – extends through southern China.

== Tropical and subtropical moist broadleaf forests ==
- Guizhou Plateau broadleaf and mixed forests
- Hainan Island monsoon rain forests
- Jiang Nan subtropical evergreen forests
- Mizoram–Manipur–Kachin rain forests
- Northern Indochina subtropical forests
- South China Sea Islands
- South China-Vietnam subtropical evergreen forests
- South Taiwan monsoon rain forests (Taiwan)
- Taiwan subtropical evergreen forests (Taiwan)
- Yunnan Plateau subtropical evergreen forests

== Temperate broadleaf and mixed forests ==
- Central China loess plateau mixed forests
- Changbai Mountains mixed forests
- Changjiang Plain evergreen forests
- Daba Mountains evergreen forests
- Eastern Himalayan broadleaf forests
- Huang He Plain mixed forests
- Manchurian mixed forests
- Northeast China Plain deciduous forests
- Qin Ling Mountains deciduous forests
- Sichuan Basin evergreen broadleaf forests
- Tarim Basin deciduous forests and steppe

== Temperate coniferous forests ==
- Altai montane forest and forest steppe
- Da Hinggan–Dzhagdy Mountains conifer forests
- Eastern Himalayan subalpine conifer forests
- Helanshan montane conifer forests
- Hengduan Mountains subalpine conifer forests
- Northeastern Himalayan subalpine conifer forests
- Nujiang Lancang Gorge alpine conifer and mixed forests
- Qilian Mountains conifer forests
- Qionglai–Minshan conifer forests
- Tian Shan montane conifer forests

== Temperate grasslands, savannas, and shrublands ==
- Altai steppe and semi-desert
- Daurian forest steppe
- Emin Valley steppe
- Mongolian–Manchurian grassland
- Tian Shan foothill arid steppe

== Flooded grasslands and savannas ==
- Amur meadow steppe
- Bohai Sea saline meadow
- Nenjiang River grassland
- Suiphun–Khanka meadows and forest meadows
- Yellow Sea saline meadow

== Montane grasslands and shrublands ==
- Altai alpine meadow and tundra
- Central Tibetan Plateau alpine steppe
- Eastern Himalayan alpine shrub and meadows
- Karakoram–West Tibetan Plateau alpine steppe
- North Tibetan Plateau–Kunlun Mountains alpine desert
- Northwestern Himalayan alpine shrub and meadows
- Ordos Plateau steppe
- Pamir alpine desert and tundra
- Qilian Mountains subalpine meadows
- Southeast Tibet shrub and meadows
- Tian Shan montane steppe and meadows
- Tibetan Plateau alpine shrublands and meadows
- Western Himalayan alpine shrub and meadows
- Yarlung Tsangpo arid steppe

== Deserts and xeric shrublands ==
- Alashan Plateau semi-desert
- Eastern Gobi desert steppe
- Junggar Basin semi-desert
- Qaidam Basin semi-desert
- Taklimakan desert
