= List of ecoregions in Kazakhstan =

The following is a list of ecoregions in Kazakhstan as identified by the World Wide Fund for Nature (WWF).

== Terrestrial ==
=== Temperate coniferous forests ===
- Altai montane forest and forest steppe (China, Kazakhstan, Mongolia, Russia)
- Tian Shan montane conifer forests (Kyrgyzstan, Kazakhstan, Russia)

=== Temperate grasslands, savannas and shrublands ===
- Alai-Western Tian Shan steppe (Kazakhstan, Uzbekistan, Turkmenistan)
- Altai steppe and semi-desert (Kazakhstan, China)
- Emin Valley steppe (Kazakhstan, China)
- Gissaro-Alai open woodlands (Afghanistan, Kazakhstan, Kyrgyzstan, Tajikistan, Uzbekistan)
- Kazakh forest steppe (Kazakhstan, Russia)
- Kazakh steppe (Kazakhstan, Russia)
- Kazakh upland (Kazakhstan)
- Pontic steppe (Moldova, Romania, Russia, Ukraine, Kazakhstan)
- Tian Shan foothill arid steppe (Kazakhstan, Kyrgyzstan, China)

=== Montane grasslands and shrublands ===
- Altai alpine meadow and tundra (China, Kazakhstan, Mongolia, Russia)
- Tian Shan montane steppe and meadows (China, Kazakhstan, Kyrgyzstan, Tajikistan)

=== Deserts and xeric shrublands ===
- Caspian lowland desert (Iran, Kazakhstan, Russia, Turkmenistan)
- Central Asian northern desert (Kazakhstan, Uzbekistan)
- Central Asian riparian woodlands (Kazakhstan, Uzbekistan, Turkmenistan)
- Central Asian southern desert (Kazakhstan, Uzbekistan, Turkmenistan)
- Junggar Basin semi-desert (Kazakhstan, China, Mongolia)
- Kazakh semi-desert (Kazakhstan)
