= Altai steppe and semi-desert =

Ecoregion in the Altai Mountains

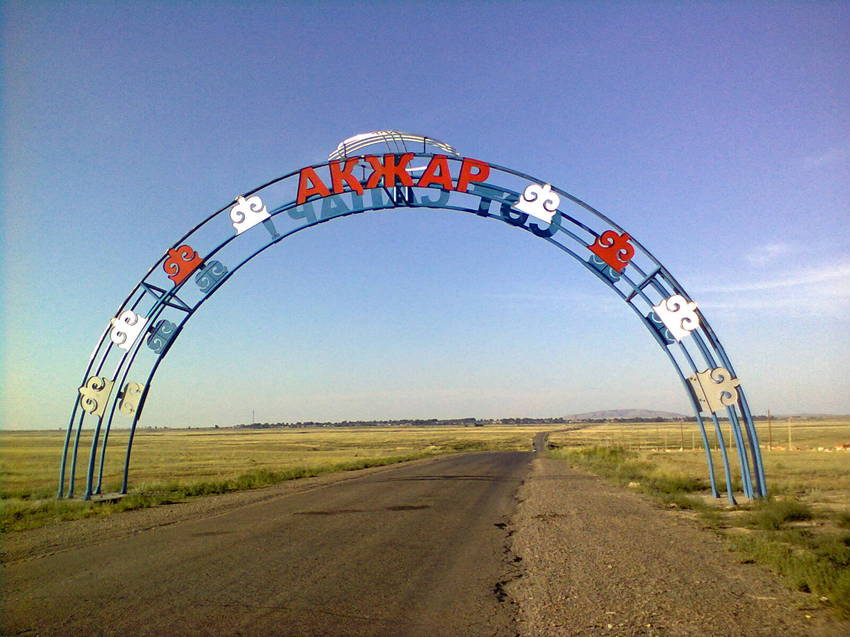
- Akzhar, District Of Tarbagatay - Gates Of Village

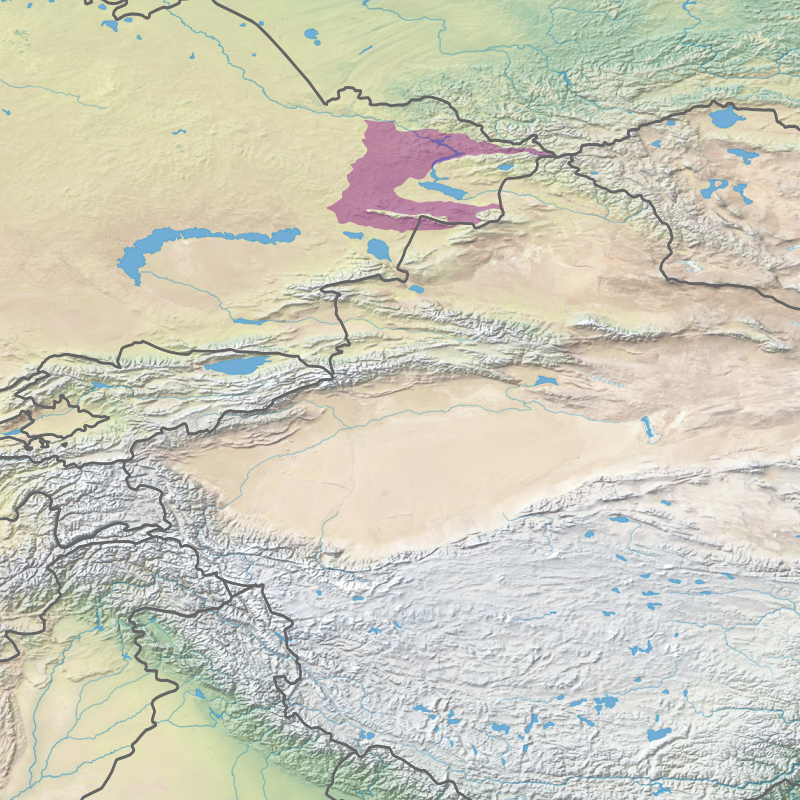
- Altai steppe and semi-desert in purple

Ecology
- Realm: Palearctic
- Biome: Temperate grasslands, savannas, and shrublands

Geography
- Area: 82,880 km^{2} (32,000 mi^{2})
- Countries: Kazakhstan; China
- Coordinates: 48°50′N 82°0′E

The Altai steppe and semi-desert ecoregion (WWF ID: PA0802), as its name indicates, sits in a transition zone between steppe and semi-desert, supporting sparse grass and shrublands. The area is relatively undeveloped, with agriculture mostly represented by grazing livestock. There are a few shallow lakes in depressions used by migratory birds.

== Location and description ==
The ecoregion is situated between steppe on its south (the Emin Valley steppe ecoregion) and conifer forests to its north (the Altai montane forest and forest steppe ecoregion). To the west is the Kazakh semi-desert ecoregion and to the east is the Junggar Basin semi-desert and Lake Zaysan. The Irtysh River runs along the northeast of the ecoregion, and the Tarbagatay Mountains along the south. A small portion of the ecoregion reaches into China.

== Climate ==
The climate of the ecoregion is Humid continental climate, warm summer (Köppen climate classification (Dfb)). This climate is characterized by large seasonal temperature differentials and a warm summer (at least four months averaging over 10 °C (50 °F), but no month averaging over 22 °C (72 °F).

== Flora and fauna ==
The ground cover is grassland, shrubs, and bare rock. Use of the land for livestock range is putting pressure on wildlife. The Manrak ridge in the southeast of the region is an important area for birds, with 121 species identified.

== See also ==
- List of ecoregions in China
