= Qin Ling Mountains deciduous forests =

Ecoregion in Central China

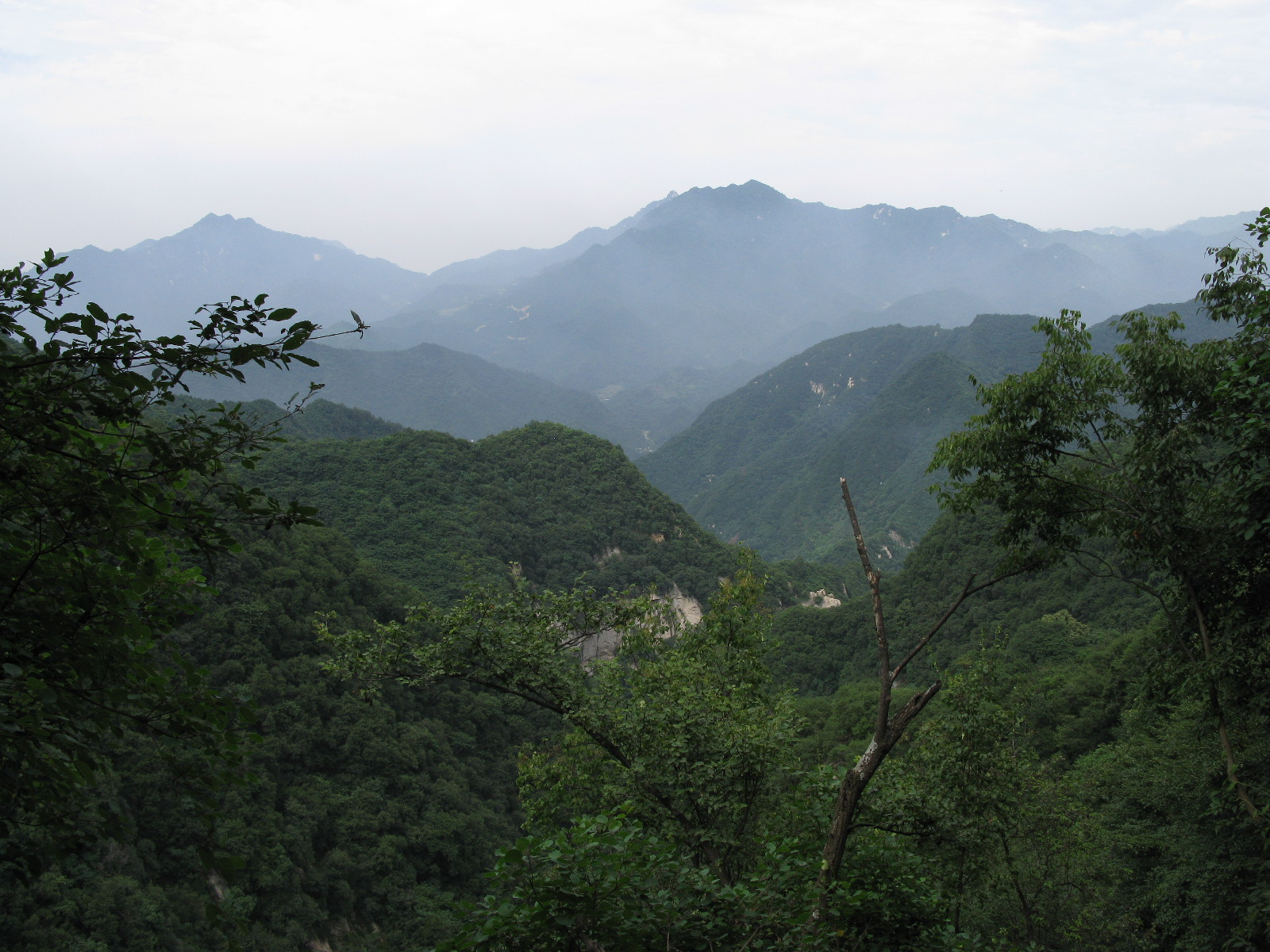
- Qin Ling mountains

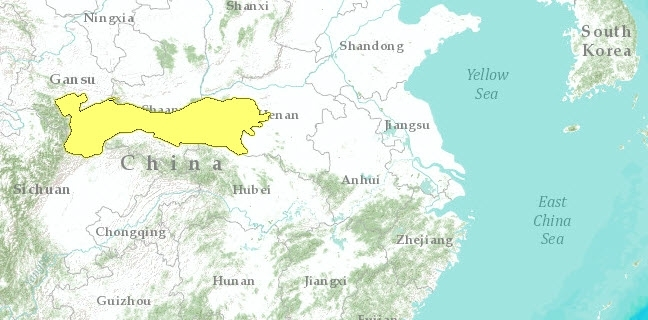
- Ecoregion territory (in yellow)

Ecology
- Realm: Palearctic
- Biome: Temperate broadleaf and mixed forest

Geography
- Area: 123,283 km^{2} (47,600 sq mi)
- Countries: China
- Coordinates: 33°30′N 109°00′E

The Qin Ling Mountains deciduous forests ecoregion (WWF ID: PA0434) covers the Qin Mountains, which run west-to-east across central China. The mountains effectively divide the biological regions of China into north and south. To the north is the Yellow River basin, a loess-soil region of temperate deciduous forests. To the south is the Yangtze River basic, a subtropical forest region. In between, the Qin Mountains support many rare and endemic species, including the Giant panda and the Sichuan snub-nosed monkey.

== Location and description ==
The Qin Mountains or Qin Ling Mountains (Chinese: 秦岭山), also called "Nanshan" (Southern Mountains), are the traditional dividing line between northern and southern China. They stretch 500 kilometres (310 mi) across southern Shaanxi Province, with the Yellow River basin to the north, and Yangtze River basin to the south. The Daba Mountains run parallel to the main northern ridge of the Qinling, placing the Daba Mountains evergreen forests ecoregion to the south of the Qin Ling ecoregion. The highest elevation in the Qinling is 3,700 metres (12,100 ft).

== Climate ==
The climate of the ecoregion is subtropical highland to humid continental climate (Köppen: Cwb to Dwb), with a dry winter. This climate is characterized by large seasonal temperature differentials and a warm summer (at least four months averaging over 10 °C (50 °F), but no month averaging over 22 °C (72 °F), and cold winters having monthly precipitation less than one-tenth of the wettest summer month. Precipitation averages 850 to 950 mm/year in the Qinling Mountains. Example of a valley climate in the ecoregion: Shangluo.

== Flora and fauna ==
The Qin Ling deciduous forests ecoregion sits on the north-facing ridge of the divide; the Daba Mountains face south. The Qinling are colder, being more exposed to the climate of northern China. The forests exhibit altitude zonation, with deciduous forests of oak, elm, walnut, ash and maple at the lowest level. The middle elevations support a mixed forest of deciduous trees (oak and birch) and evergreen conifers such as Chinese white pine (Pinus armandii). At higher elevations the forests thin to sub-alpine fir, larch, birch, and rhododendron.

The ecoregion is the eastern range of the Giant panda, and also provides habitat for the endangered Red panda (Ailurus fulgens), and the Chinese snub-nosed monkey (Rhinopithecus roxellana). A stable population of the Giant panda is found in the Foping National Nature Reserve in the ecoregion.

== See also ==
- List of ecoregions in China
