= Qilian Mountains subalpine meadows =

Ecoregion in China

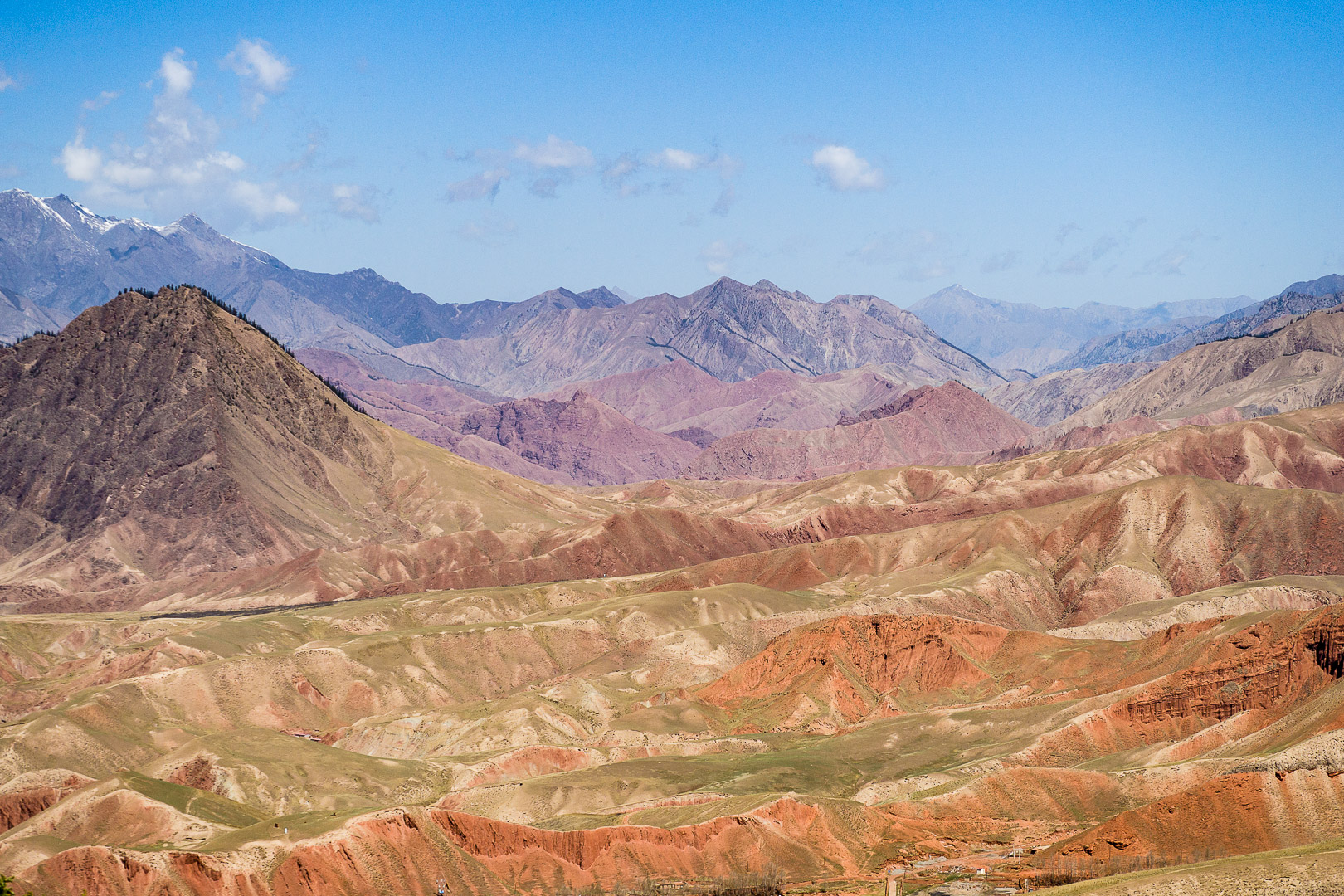
- Qilian Mountains

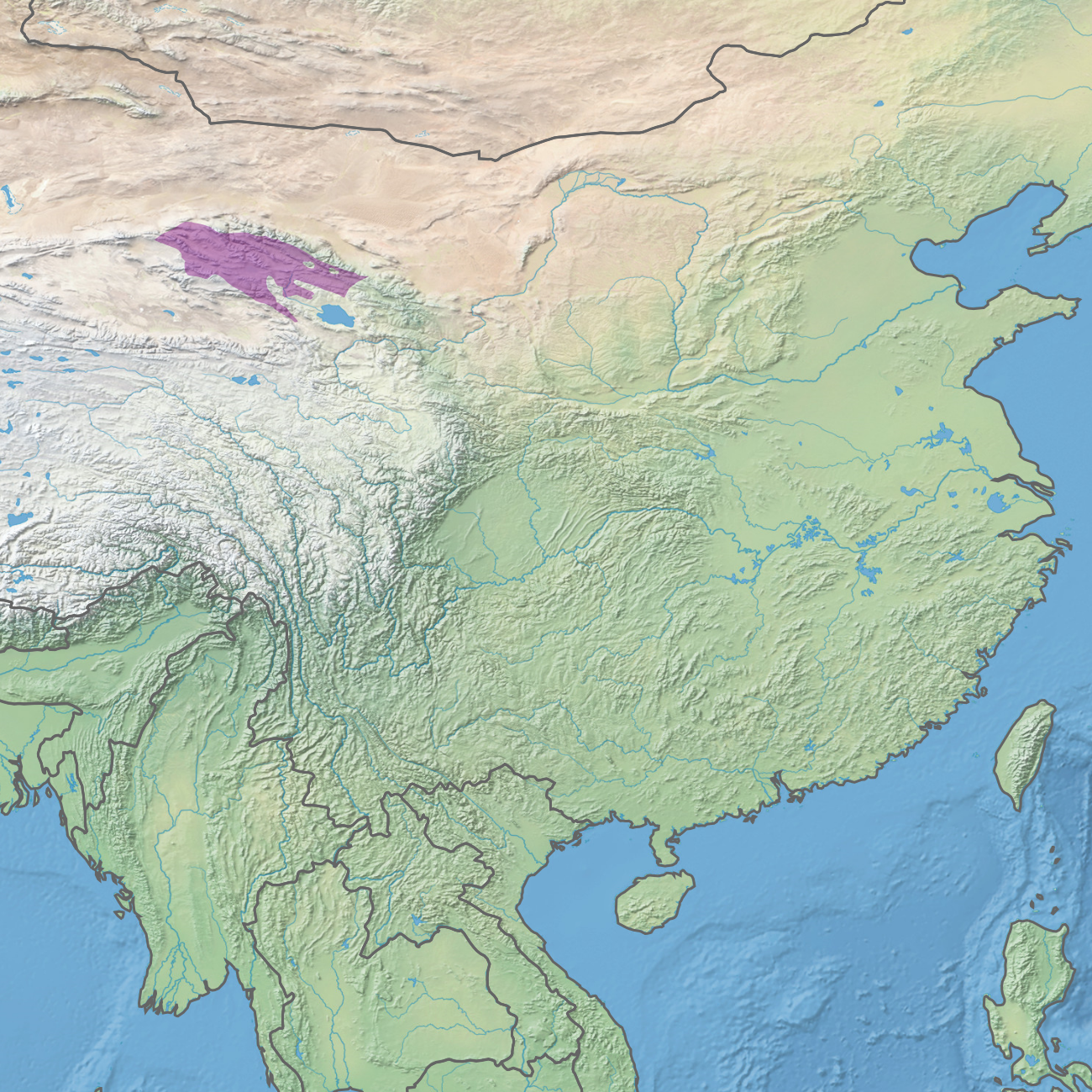
- Ecoregion territory (in purple)

Ecology
- Realm: Palearctic
- Biome: Montane grasslands and shrublands

Geography
- Area: 73,297 km^{2} (28,300 sq mi)
- Countries: China
- Coordinates: 39°00′N 97°30′E

The Qilian Mountains subalpine meadows ecoregion (WWF ID: PA1015) covers the high meadows and shrubland of the Qilian Mountains, on the northeastern edge of the Tibetan Plateau in central China. These mountains form a divide between the dry regions of the Gobi Desert to the north, and the Qaidam Basin and the Tibetan Plateau to the south. While the habitat supports populations of marmots, grouse and some rare mammal species, the grasslands of the region are under pressure from over-grazing by domestic livestock.

== Location and description ==
The Qilian Mountains lie on the northeastern rim of the Tibetan Plateau in central China, forming a border between Qinghai Province and Gansu Province. The mountains range in elevation from 3,000 meters to 5,547 meters, with a terrain of rolling hills surrounding rocky and glaciated peaks.

== Climate ==
Because of the altitude, latitude, and distance from the ocean, the climate of the ecoregion is Tundra climate (Köppen climate classification ET), a local climate in which at least one month has an average temperature high enough to melt snow (0 °C (32 °F)), but no month with an average temperature in excess of 10 °C (50 °F).

== Flora and fauna ==
The vegetation of the ecoregion exhibits altitude zoning typical to the Tibetan Plateau. Meadows are found below 3,300 meters, particularly on the drier southern slopes. Deciduous shrubs are dominant from 3,300 to 4,500 meters, and above 4,500 meters are found mostly cushion plants and barren rock. There are scattered sub-alpine conifer forests in the Qilian Mountains, mostly on the northern slopes; these forests constitute a separate ecoregion, the Qilian Mountains conifer forests.

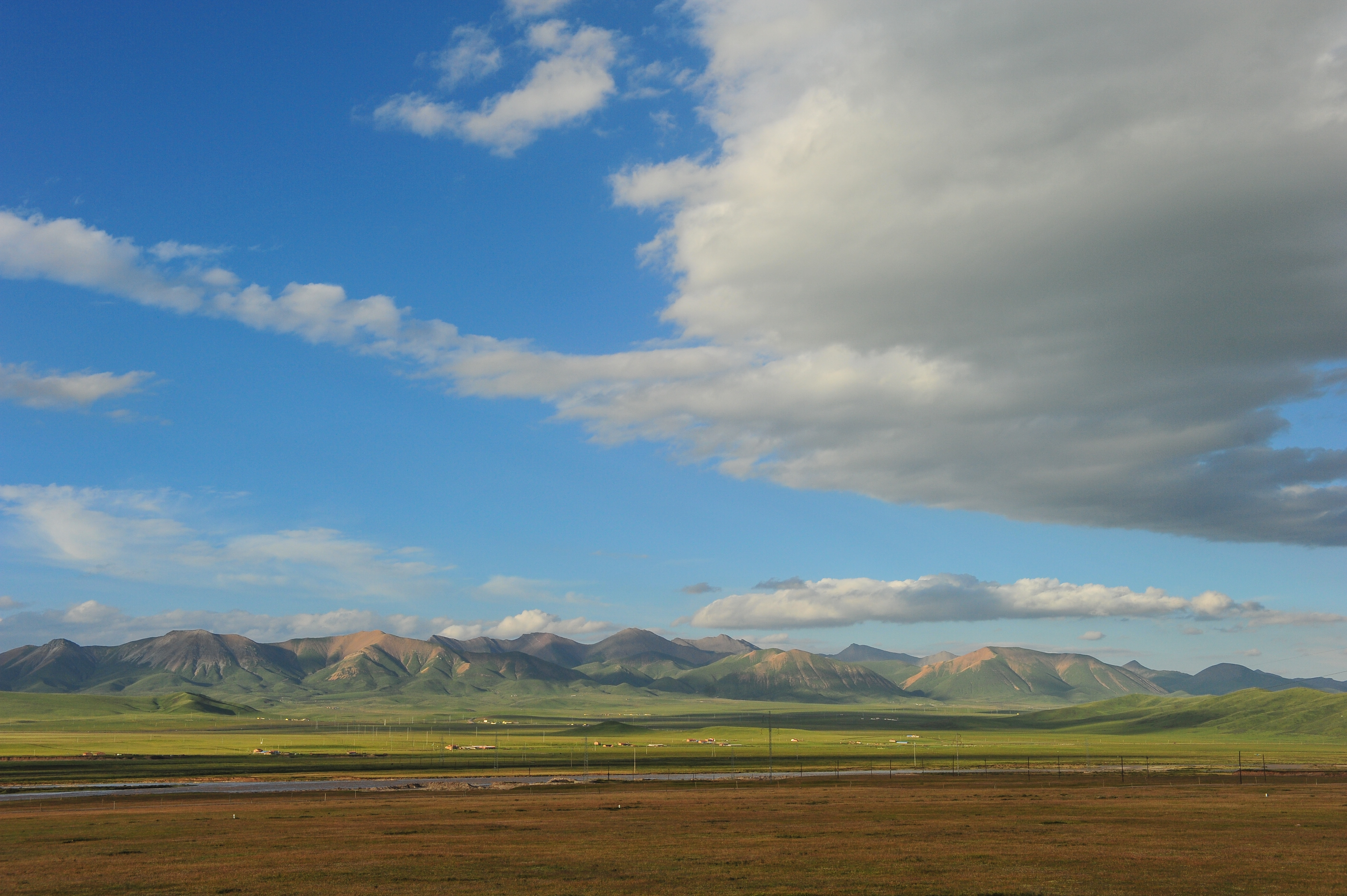
High meadows north of Qinhai Lake

The area supports herds of the vulnerable Thorold's deer, Tibetan antelope, and yak. The wild ungulates compete with domestic sheep for the available grasses.

== See also ==
- Ecoregions in China
