= Lake Alakol =

Lake in the country of Kazakhstan

Alakol Lake
- Алакөл
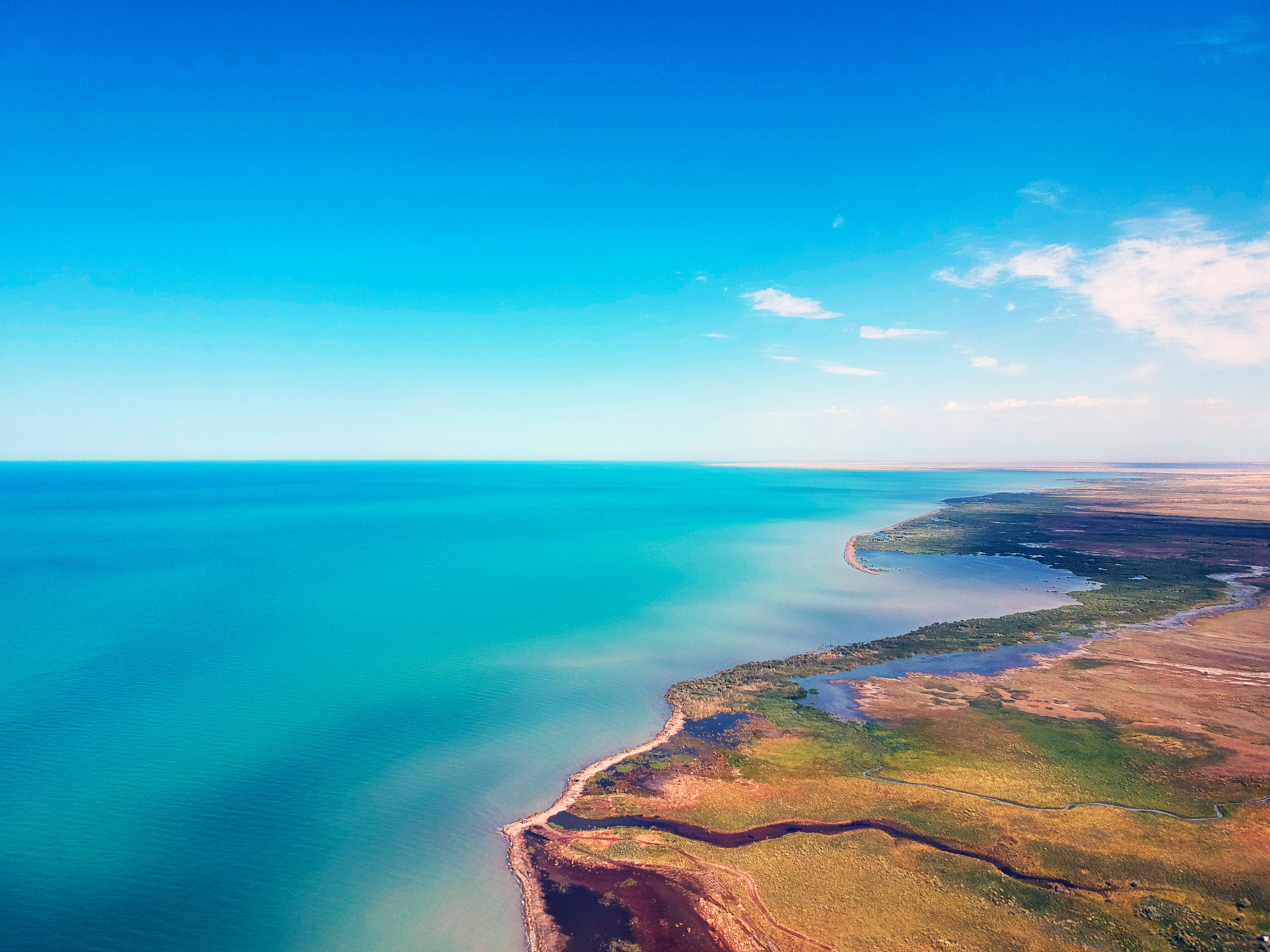
- Alakol lakeshore panorama.

- Location within Kazakhstan
- Location: Abai and Jetisu regions, Kazakhstan
- Coordinates: 46°10′N 81°35′E
- Type: salt lake
- Basin countries: Kazakhstan
- Surface area: 2,650 km^{2} (1,020 sq mi)
- Max. depth: 54 m (177 ft)
- Water volume: 58.6 km^{3} (47,500,000 acre⋅ft)
- Surface elevation: 347 m (1,138 ft)

Alakol Lake (Kazakh: Алакөл, Alaköl is a lake located in the Balkhash-Alakol Basin, part of the Abai and Jetisu regions, in east-central Kazakhstan. Its elevation is 347 m (1,138 ft) above sea level.

The lake is the northwest extension of the region known as the Dzhungarian Gate (Alataw Pass), a narrow valley that connects the southern uplands of Kazakhstan with arid northwest China. The Dzhungarian Gate is a fault-bounded valley (see vertical line on the image along the southwest side of the lake) where the elevation of the valley floor is between 350 and 450 m above sea level and the peaks of the Dzhungarsky Alatau range (lower left) reach 4,463 m (14,642 ft) above sea level. Two well-defined alluvial fans are visible where mountain streams cut through the faulted landscape to the southwest of the lake.

Its waters are reputed to have medicinal properties since the time of the Silk Road. In 2021, Lake Alakol was selected as one of the top 10 tourist destinations in Kazakhstan.

== Geography ==
The surface area of the lake is 2,650 km2 (1,020 sq mi). It is 54 m (177 ft) deep at its maximum depth, with a volume of 58.6 km^{3}. A swampy lowland (just above the center of the photo) connects the northwest end of Lake Alakol with the Kosharkol and Sasykkol (the two lighter-colored lakes in the photo). From the southern tip of Lake Alakol a narrow swampy valley connects it to the freshwater Lake Zhalanashkol (at the bottom edge of the picture).

Alakol Lake, a salt lake, has a drainage basin of 65,200 km^{2} (25,200 sq mi) and receives water periodically from several streams flowing from the Tarbagatai Mountains. Among them are the southerly draining Urzhar River at the north end of the lake, and the Emil River, on the lake's north-eastern shore. During seasonal floods, surplus water drains from Lake Zhalanashkol to Lake Alakol along the 10-km long slough called Zhaman-Otkel (Russian: Жаман-Откель).

The Alakol State Sanctuary has been created to protect the area for the lake is an important breeding and nesting ground for various wetland birds, notably the very rare relict gull. Piski Island has flocks of flamingo, and 40 species of other birds. UNESCO designated the Alakol Biosphere Reserve as part of its Man and the Biosphere Programme in 2013.

Ulken Araltobe is one of the islands in Lake Alakol, with an area of 2,119 ha, significantly larger than Kishkene Araltobe (148 ha) and Sredniy (23 ha).

Agricultural activity in this arid region is limited to areas where adequate moisture is available, mainly along ephemeral streambeds and in the deltas and alluvial fans.

In the middle of the 1st century BCE the Lake Alakol marked an eastern end of the Kangju state, shown on Chinese maps of the Western territory.

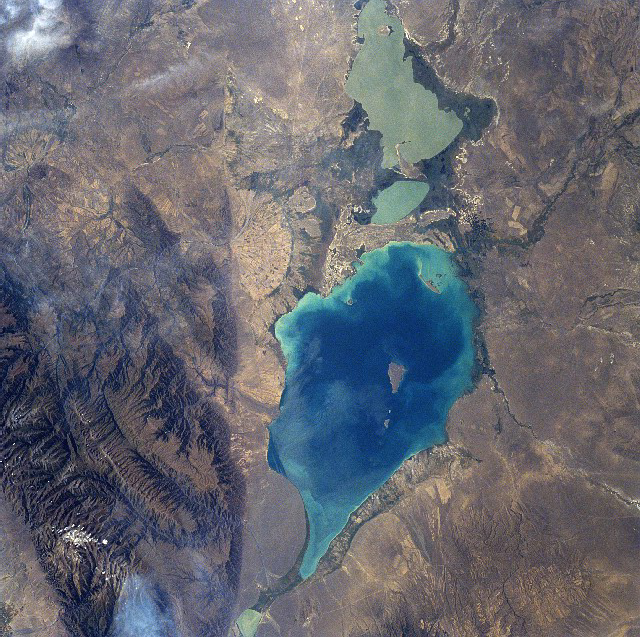
Lake Alakol; north at top right.

== History ==
During the reign of Timur, it was said that this lake "It-Ichmes" (translated "dog will not drink") because one liter of water contains 8 g of salt. Kimaks (IX-XI centuries) called this lake Gagan, after the city located on the site of the village of Koktuma.

Alakol has been called "The great gift of nature in Kazakhstan".

The lake is already thought to be reported in the account given by William of Rubruck of his voyage to Karakorum, but he thinks it to be an inner sea, the oriental end of the Lake Balkash.

== Medical property ==
Modern medical research confirms the healing qualities of lake water. Sea breath of Alakol in a combination with dry, hot, filled with aroma of steppes, the air has a beneficial effect on humans. It was in the resort areas of Alakol that cosmonauts underwent rehabilitation after returning from orbit.

== See also ==
- Emin Valley
