= Altai montane forest and forest steppe =

Ecoregion in the Altai Mountains

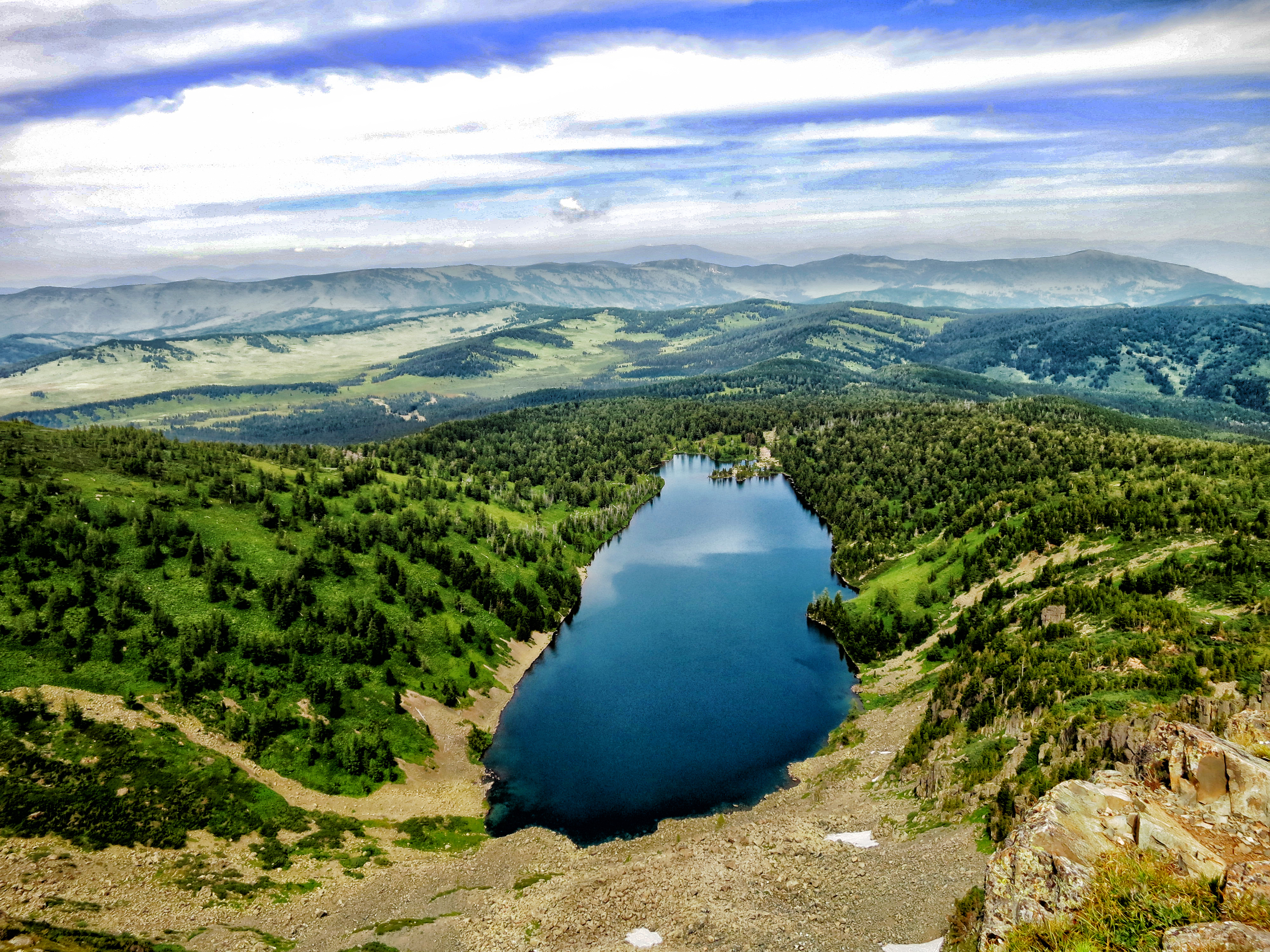
- Forest and forest-steppe in Katun Nature Reserve

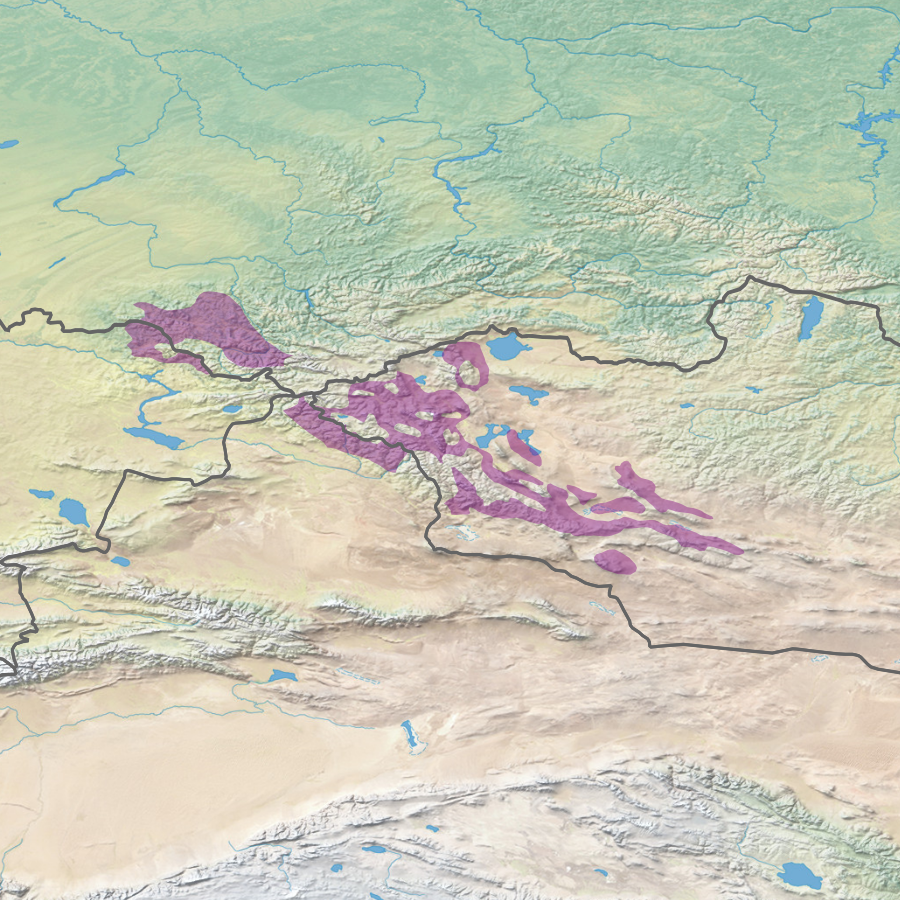
- Altai montane forest and forest steppe in purple

Ecology
- Realm: Palearctic
- Biome: temperate coniferous forest

Geography
- Area: 142,449 km^{2} (55,000 sq mi)
- Countries: Russia; Kazakhstan; Mongolia; China
- Coordinates: 48.25°N 90.25°E
- Climate type: Cold semi-arid climate (Bsk)

The Altai montane forest and forest steppe ecoregion (WWF ID: PA0502) covers patches of the subalpine forest belt on the Altai Mountains, crossing the border region where Russia, Kazakhstan, Mongolia and China meet. The region has high biodiversity, as it is located in transition zones between different ecoregions, altitudes, and climate zones. It is in the Palearctic realm, with a Cold semi-arid climate. It covers 35,199,998 km^{2} (13,590,795 sq mi).

== Location and description ==
The ecoregion stretches 1,500 km, from the Belukh Range of the Altai mountains on the Russia-Kazakhstan border in the northwest, to the Gobi-Altai in Mongolia to the southeast. The ecoregion slices through the Altai at the sub-alpine elevations, leaving out the alpine peaks above, and the lakes and valleys below. To the south of the Altai are the cold, arid regions of central Asia, and to the north are the forests and wetlands of Siberia.

== Climate ==
Because of its altitude distance from the ocean, the ecoregion has a cold semi-arid climate (Köppen climate classification Bsk). This indicates a local climate characterized by cool summers, and cold, dry winters. These climate regions tend to be found at higher elevations in the middle of continents, with wide differences between day and night temperatures.

Climate at 48.25 N, 90.25 E

Climate chart (precipitation, max. and min. temperature)
J	F	M	A	M	J	J	A	S	O	N	D
0.1 −6 −31	0.1 −2 −29	0.4 12 −14	0.7 35 10	1.1 49 24	1.4 59 32	2 62 36	1.4 60 33	0.7 50 24	0.4 35 10	0.4 15 −9	0.4 0 −24
- █ Average max. and min. temperatures in °F
- █ Precipitation totals in inches
- Source: GlobalSpecies.org
Metric conversion
J	F	M	A	M	J	J	A	S	O	N	D
2.5 −21 −35	2.5 −19 −34	10 −11 −25	18 1 −12	28 10 −5	36 15 0	51 17 2	36 16 0	18 10 −5	10 2 −12	10 −10 −23	10 −18 −31
- █ Average max. and min. temperatures in °C
- █ Precipitation totals in mm

== Flora ==
Bands of conifer forests tend to be found on the cooler, wetter northern slopes of the mountains, with desert-steppe vegetation more predominant on the southern slopes. The forests in the southeast of the region include larch and larch-cedar stands. Mid-elevation grasses are dominated by tundra fescue (Festuca lenensis) and prairie junegrass (Koeleria macrantha). Desert-steppe vegetation in the south often features European feather grass (Stipa pennata), wild onion (Allium polyrhizum), Anabasis breviloa, and fringed sagebrush (Artemisia frigida). This is only a representative list, however, as the biodiversity in the area is very high. The World Wildlife Federation notes that the endemism of the area (12%) is higher than that of the Pyrenees or Alps.

== Fauna ==
As a meeting zone of forest species from the north, and southern species from the south, the Altai mid-elevations exhibits high numbers of species. The most numerous of the southern small mammals are the Gray marmot (Marmota baibacina), the Tarbagan marmot (M. sibirica), and Lagomorpha (rabbits, hares, and pikas). The area is home to several globally threatened species, such as the Snow leopard (Uncia uncia).

== Protections ==
Officially protected areas in the ecoregion include:

- Katun Nature Reserve ("Katunsky"). An IUCN class Ia "strict ecological reserve" (a Zapovednik) located in the northwest section of the Altai montane forest and forest steppe ecoregion, north of the Russia-Kazakhstan border. This nature reserve is in the highlands of the central Altai mountains; the Katun River flowing down its slopes form the headwaters of the Ob River. (Area: 150,079 km2).
- Munkhkhairkhan National Park. A national park of Mongolia, covering the second-highest mountain in Mongolia, Mönkhkhairkhan Mountain at an altitude of 4,362 metres (14,311 ft) (Area: 5061 km2).

== See also ==
- Altai-Sayan region
- List of ecoregions in Russia
- List of ecoregions in Mongolia
- List of ecoregions in China
- List of ecoregions in Kazakhstan
