= Yellow Sea saline meadow =

Ecoregion in the Yellow Sea Coast

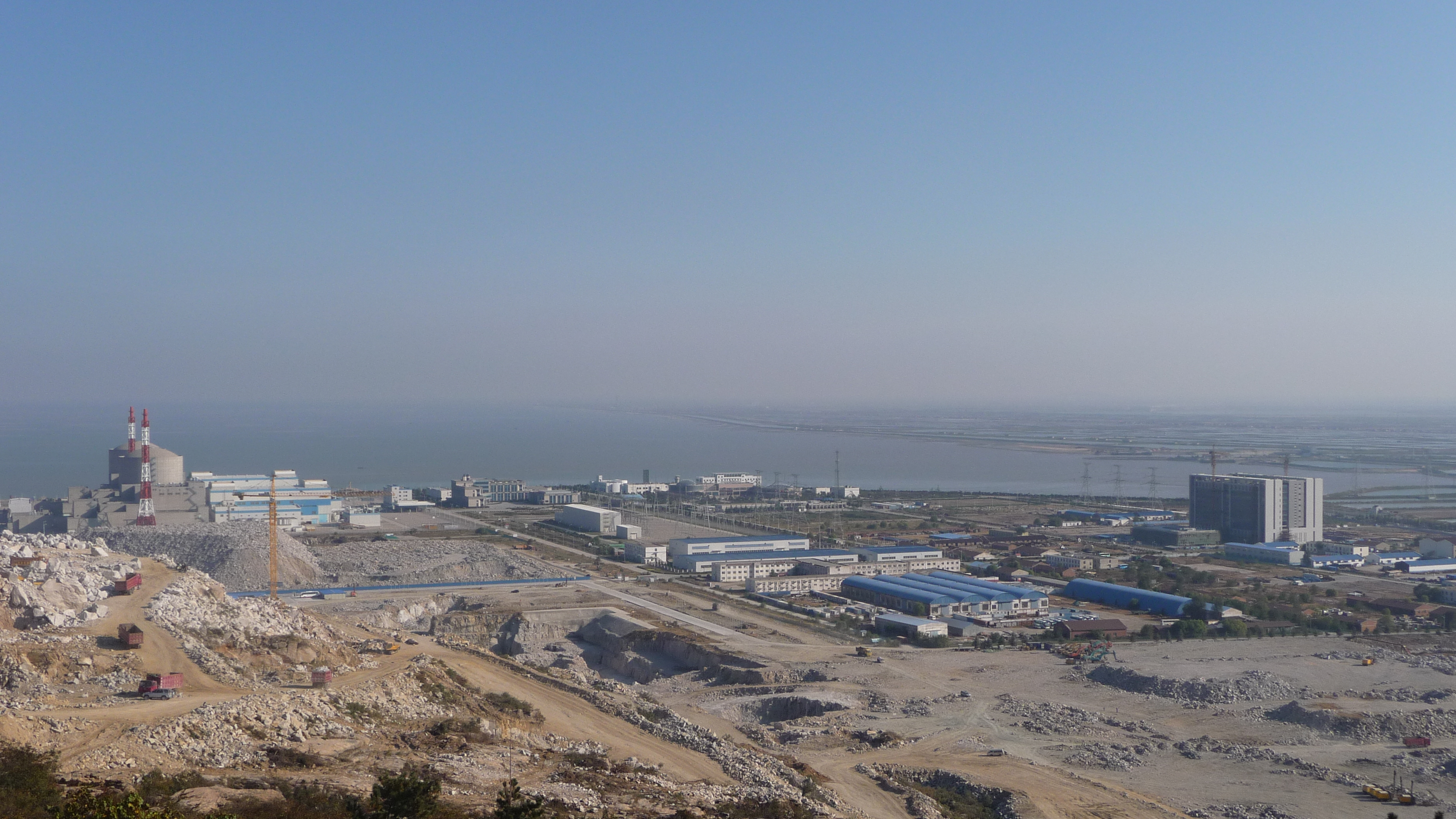
- Northern border of ecoregion, in distance across the bay from Tianwan Nuclear Power Plant

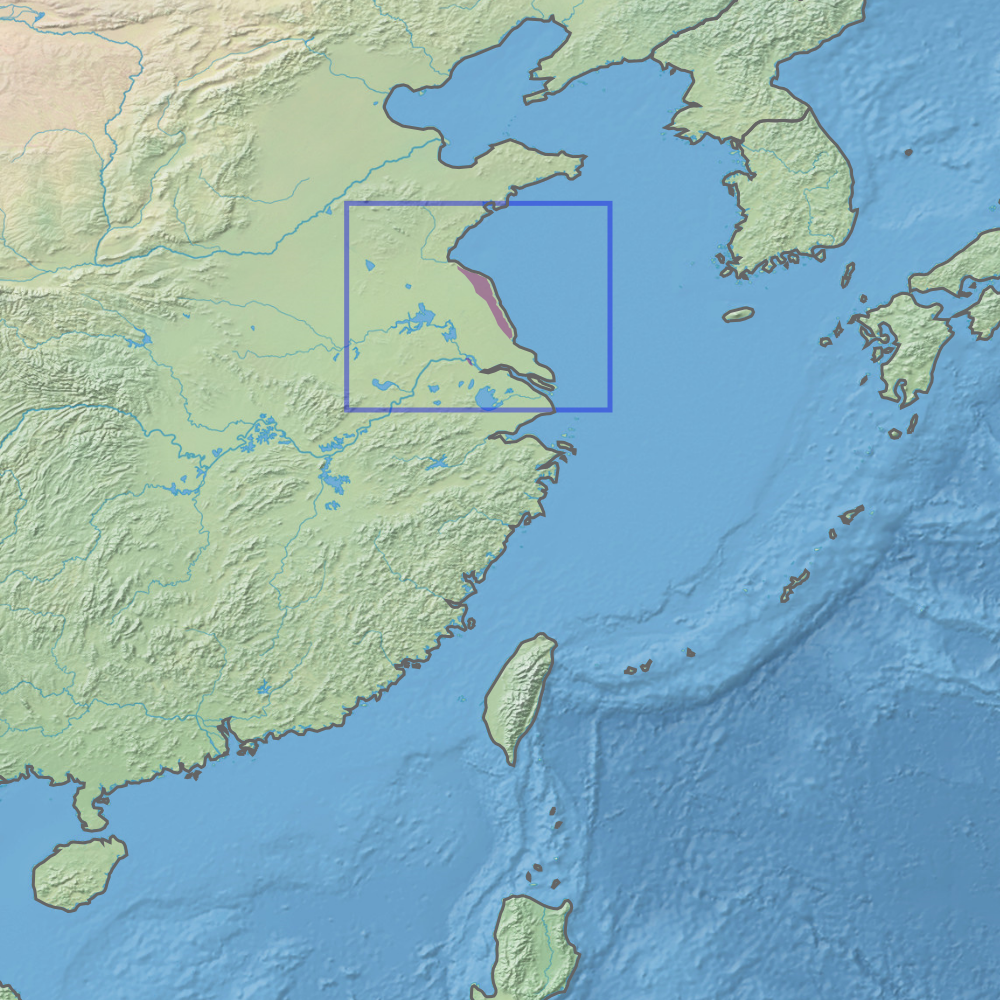
- Ecoregion territory (in purple)

Ecology
- Realm: Palearctic
- Biome: Flooded grasslands and savannas

Geography
- Area: 2,000 km^{2} (770 sq mi)
- Countries: China
- Coordinates: 33°15′N 120°15′E

The Yellow Sea saline meadow ecoregion (WWF ID: PA0908) covers a thin strip of wetlands between the Shandong Peninsula and the mouth of the Yangtze River on the coast of the East China Sea. The plants of the region are adapted to the wet, saline soils transitioning inland to fresh water arriving from the west. The area is an important stop-over on the East Asian–Australasian Flyway. The region is under heavy ecological pressure from human development and agriculture.

== Location and description ==
The ecoregion runs 150 kilometres (93 mi) north-south along the coast, reaching only 30 kilometres (19 mi) inland. At the south end is the outlet of the Yangtze River into the Yellow Sea; at the northern end is the outlet of the Xinyi River, an offshoot of the Huai River. Both rivers carry deposits that add to the mud flats of the river deltas, mixing freshwater into saline environments of the coast. Due to the silt additions, the regions is extending an average of 1 km into the sea every 60 years.

== Climate ==
The climate of the ecoregion is Humid continental climate, warm wet summer (Köppen climate classification (Cfa)). This climate is characterized by large seasonal temperature differentials. No month averages below 0 °C (32 °F), at least one month averages above 22 °C (72 °F), and four months average over 10 °C (50 °F). Precipitation is generally highest in the summer. Annual precipitation is 800 - 1,200 mm. The ecoregion sits in the transition zone between the temperate zone to the north, and the sub-tropical region to the south.

== Flora and fauna ==
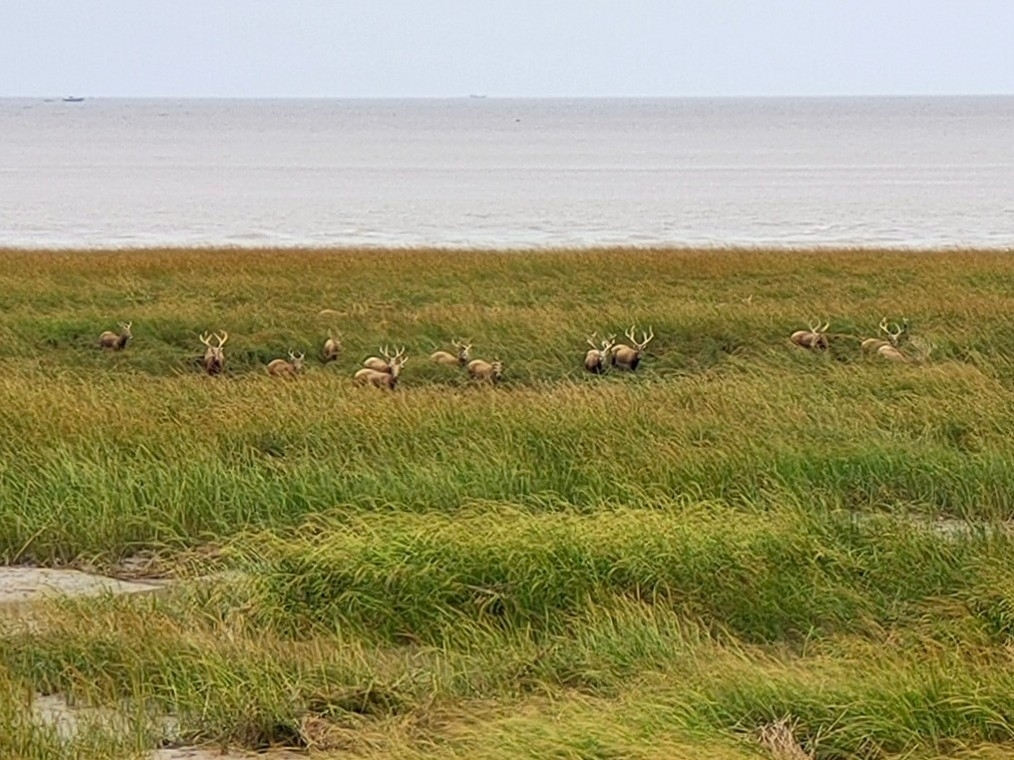
Père David's Deer grazing on saline meadow

Jiangsu Province, in which the ecoregion is located, is the most densely populated province in China, so the area in heavily developed. The land is almost completely converted to human habitation, rice agriculture, or fish aquaculture. There are some areas of saline grass and sedge marshes, and inter-tidal mudflats. The saline meadows are characterized by Suaeda salsa, the inland fresh water fed areas by kunai grass (Imperata cylindrica).

The Yancheng Coastal Wetlands Nature Reserve is an important component of the ecoregion, hosting an estimated 500,000 migratory birds each year. An estimated 40% of the world's endangered Red-crowned cranes breed in the area.

== See also ==
- List of ecoregions in China
