= Nenjiang River grassland =

Ecoregion in the Nen river basin

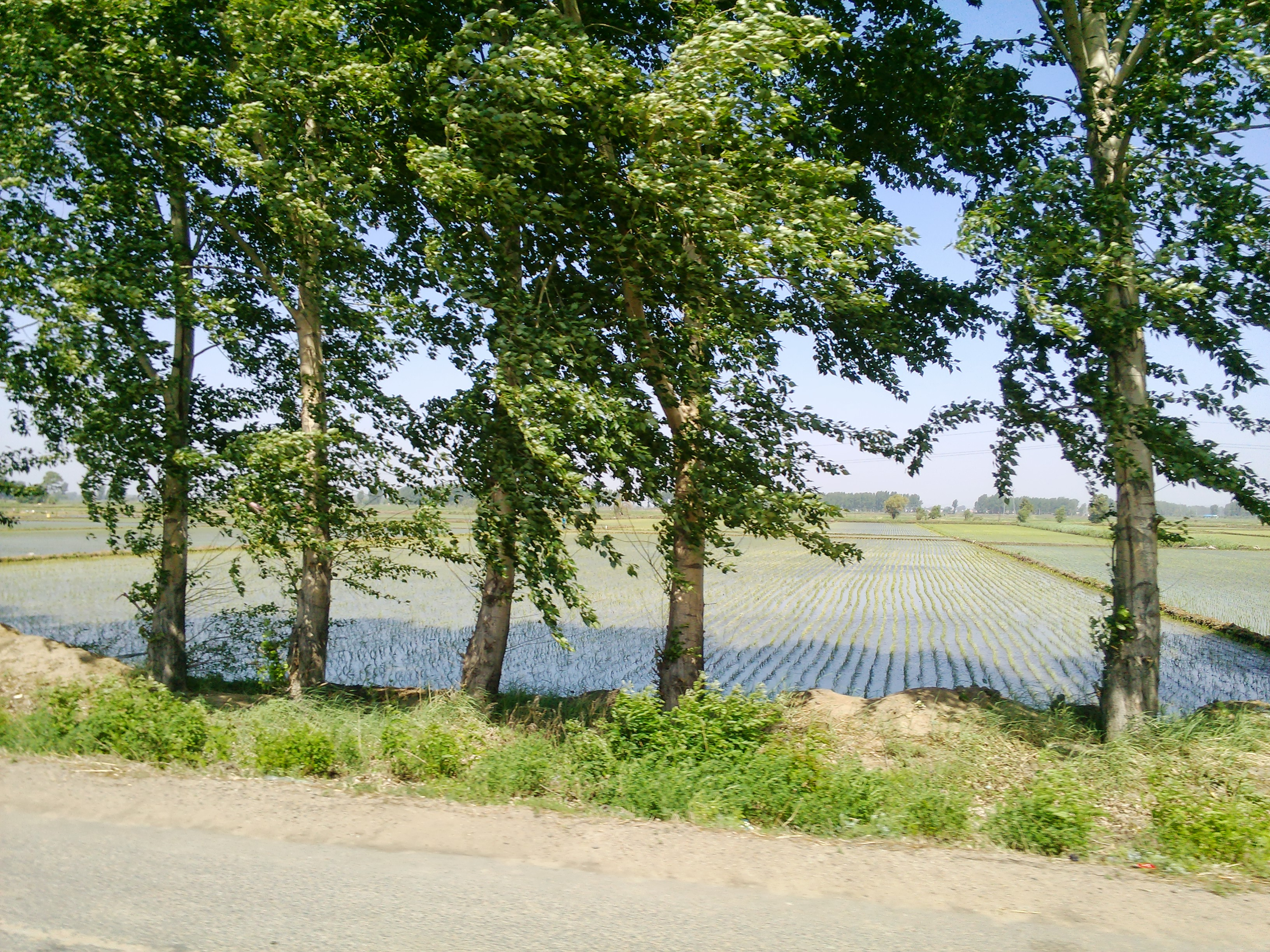
- Flooded area in the ecoregion

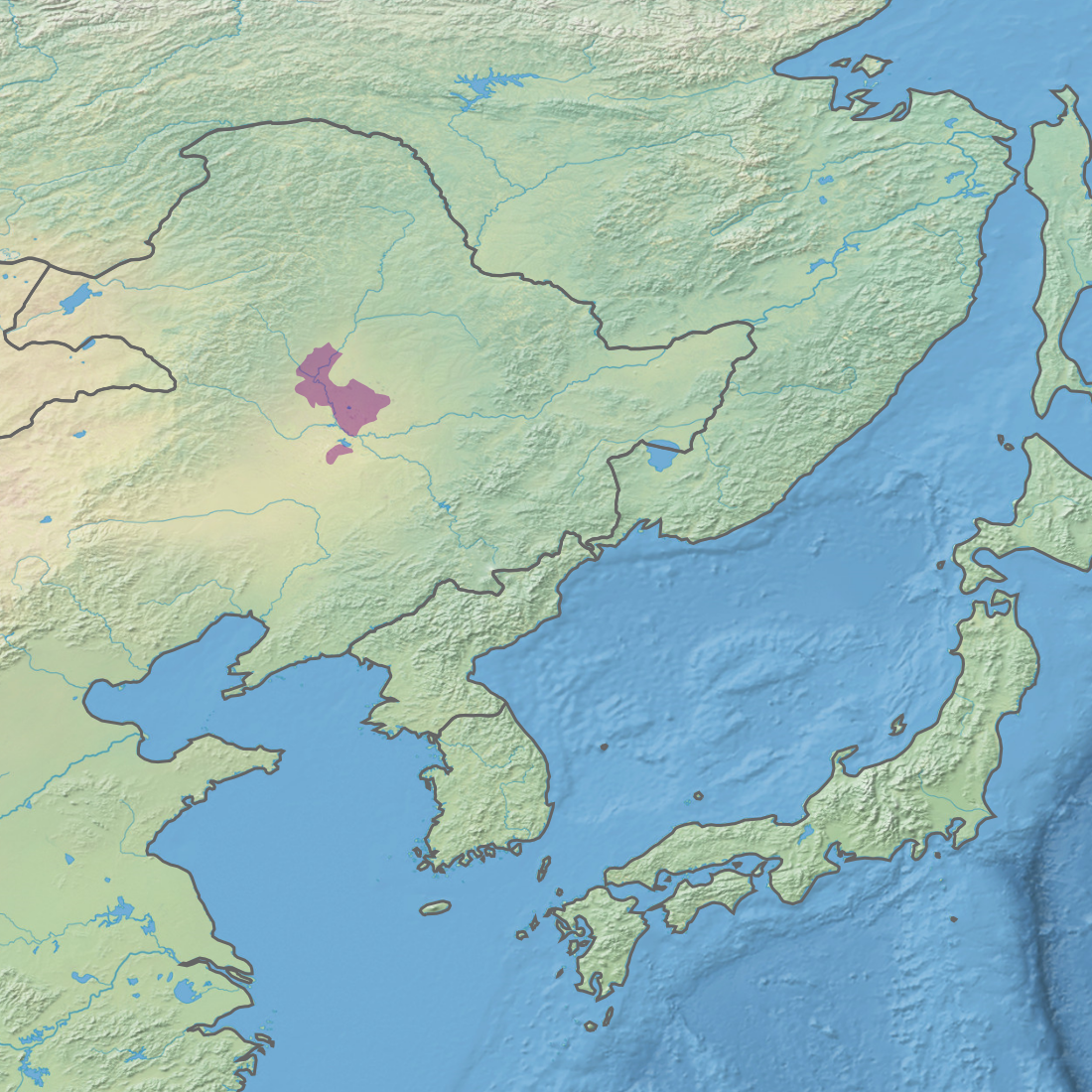
- Ecoregion territory (in purple)

Ecology
- Realm: Palearctic
- Biome: Flooded grasslands and savannas

Geography
- Area: 23,310 km^{2} (9,000 sq mi)
- Countries: China
- Coordinates: 45°15′N 124°15′E

The Nenjiang River grassland ecoregion (WWF ID: PA0903) covers the low wetlands of the lower Nen River (Nenjiang River) in northeast China. The region is known for supporting migratory and permanent nesting populations of a variety of migratory waterfowl, including six species of crane.

== Location and description ==
The Nenjiang River plain is surrounded by low mountains - the Lesser Khingan to the west, the Greater Khingan to the north, and the Changbai Mountains along the Korean border to the south. The Nenjiang River carries sediment down from the north, before emptying into the Songhua River in the ecoregion. Because the surrounding plain is relatively poorly drained, the grasslands are periodically flooded.

== Climate ==
The climate of the Nenjiang ecoregion is Humid continental climate, hot summer (Köppen climate classification (Dwa)), with a dry winter. This climate is characterized by large seasonal temperature differentials and a hot summer (at least one month averaging over 22 °C (72 °F)), and cold winters having monthly precipitation less than one-tenth of the wettest summer month. Mean annual precipitation is 400 to 450 mm/year, concentrated in the spring and summer rainy season.

== Flora and fauna ==
The ecoregion's habitats are characterized by patches of swampy coniferous forests (Larch (Larix gmelini) with an under-story of birch (Betula)) surrounded by meadows of grasses and sedges. Also among the meadows are freshwater or brackish lakes edged with reed beds.

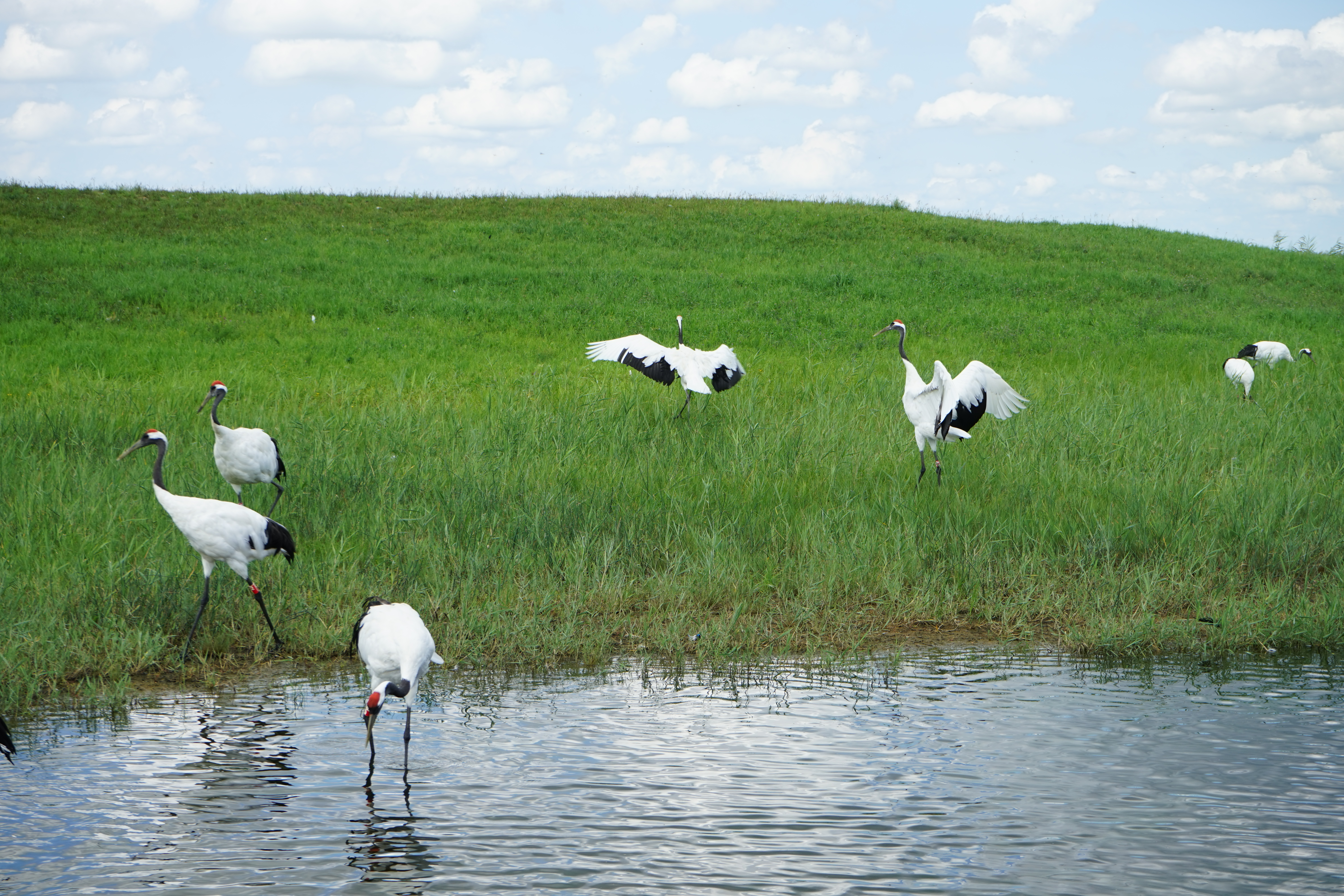
Red-crowned cranes in the Zhalong Nature Reserve, 2017

The extensive network of rivers and lakes, and seasonally flooded wetlands, are notable for supporting several species of crane, including breeding populations of the endangered Red-crowned crane, the vulnerable White-naped crane, and the critically endangered Siberian crane. A permanent population of 350 red-crowned cranes winter in the ecoregion. The wetlands also support 42 species of fish, and several species of amphibians, including the Heilongjiang brown frog (Rana amurensis).

== Protected areas ==
Within the ecoregion are two significant protected areas:

- Zhalong Nature Reserve. A complex of marshes and ponds supporting migratory and captive populations of endangered cranes. A Ramsar wetland of international importance. (210,000 hectares (810 sq mi))
- Momoge Nature Reserve. Wetlands in the transition zone between grasslands and desert. A Ramsar wetland of international importance. (144,000 hectares (560 sq mi))

== See also ==
- Ecoregions in China
