= Bohai Sea saline meadow =

Ecoregion in the Bohai Sea Coast

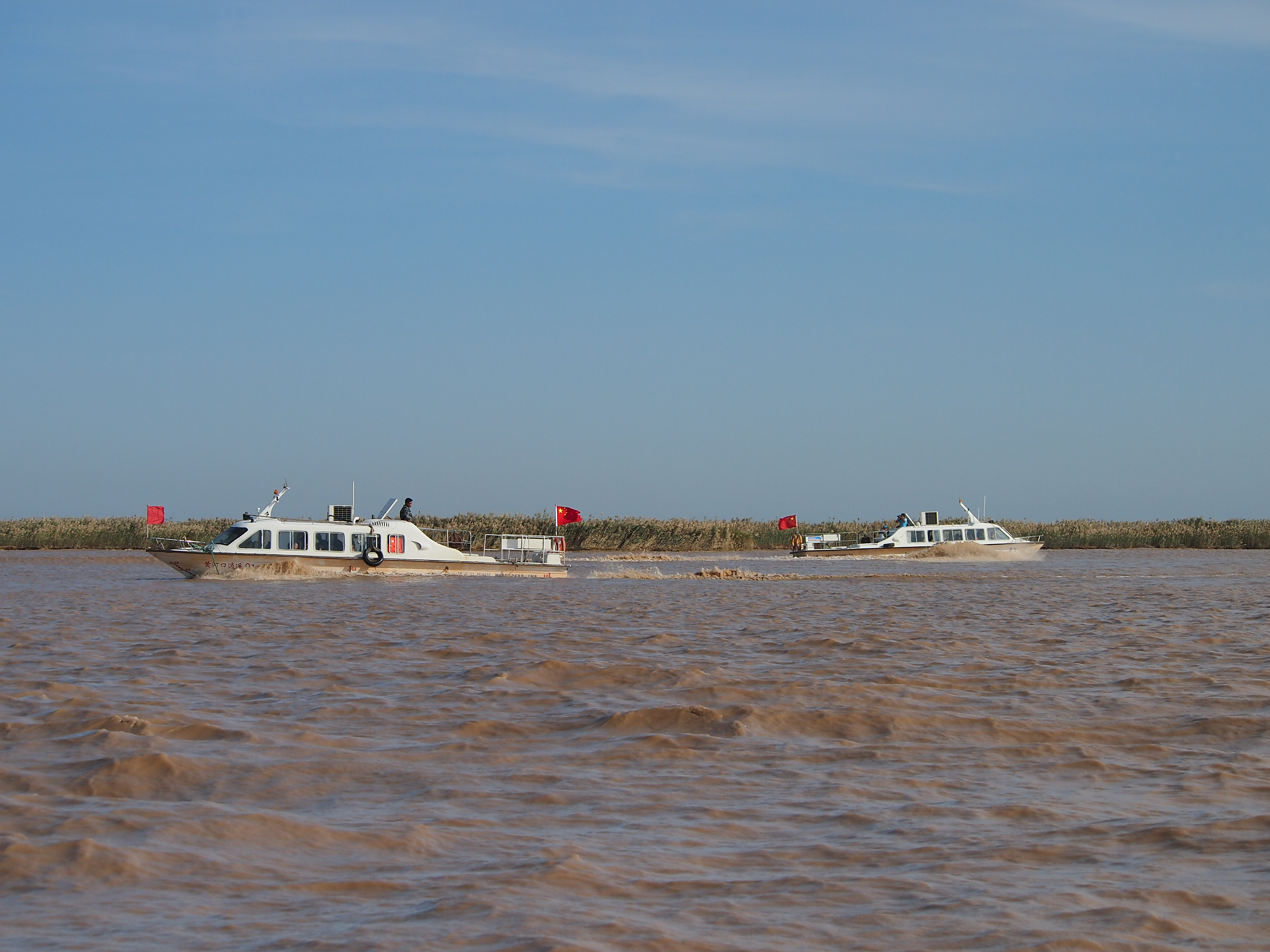
- Tourist Boats, Yellow River Delta, Bohai Bay

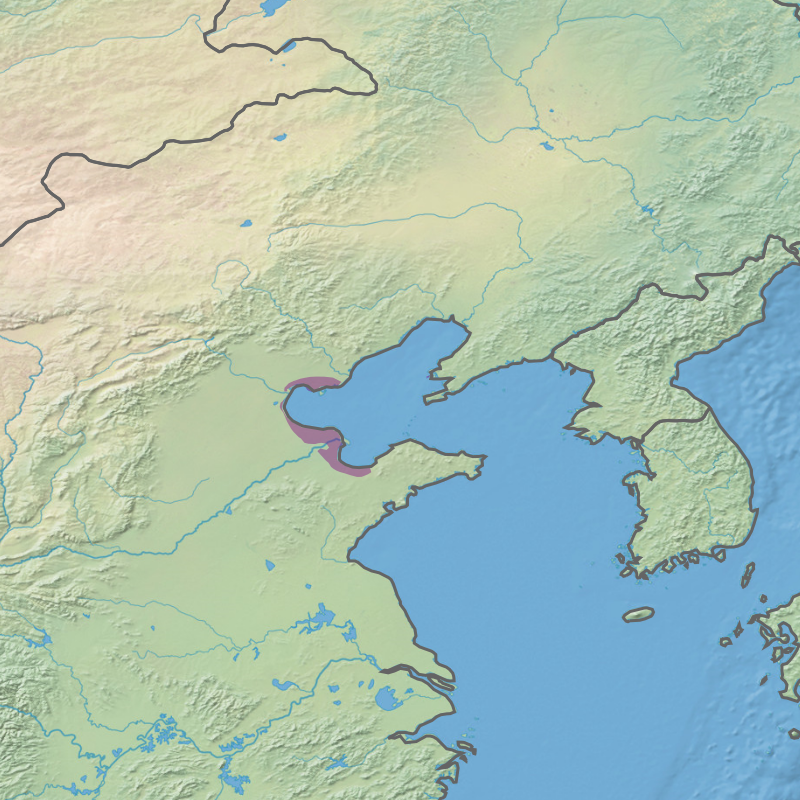
- Ecoregion territory (in purple)

Ecology
- Realm: Palearctic
- Biome: Flooded grasslands and savannas

Geography
- Area: 11,700 km^{2} (4,500 sq mi)
- Country: China
- Coordinates: 38°00′N 118°45′E

The Bohai Sea saline meadow ecoregion (WWF ID: PA0902) covers the coastal deltas of the Yellow River and the Luan River where they enter the Bohai Sea in China. The saline meadows and intertidal mudflats provide an important stopping-over point for birds migrating on the East Asian–Australasian Flyway. The region is under heavy ecological pressure from human development.

== Location and description ==
The ecoregion rims the crescent-shaped shore of Bohai Bay, on the northwest of the Bohai Sea. The river deltas are expanding from silt carried by the Yellow River from the loess soil regions to the west, and by the Luan River from the north.

Both natural and artificial wetlands are extensive in the region. The natural wetlands - reed fields and tidal flats - have diminished greatly in recent years through conversion to aquaculture and development. Artificial wetlands include paddy fields, salt fields, reservoirs and ponds. A portion of the region is a Ramsar Convention wetland of international importance. The Dongying-Huang He Nature Reserve is the area sits on the second largest oil-field in China.

== Climate ==
The climate of the ecoregion is Humid continental climate, hot summer (Köppen climate classification (Dwa)), with a dry winter. This climate is characterized by large seasonal temperature differentials and a hot summer (at least one month averaging over 22 °C (72 °F)), and cold winters having monthly precipitation less than one-tenth of the wettest summer month. The average precipitation in the region is 592 mm/year, varying up to 20%.

== Flora and fauna ==
There are a wide variety local habitats, influenced by the interplay of fresh water and silt arriving by river with salt water pressure from the sea. The interior grasslands are characterized by Kunai grass (Imperata cylindrica), the saline meadows by salt-tolerate plants such as Suaeda. Freshwater stands inland have mostly been converted to rice paddies and aquaculture ponds.

The region is an important migratory stop-over for the endangered Red-crowned crane and Siberian crane. The vulnerable Saunders's gull uses the region as one of its few breeding sites. Biodiversity is high: scientists have recorded 367 species of bird, and 197 species of fish, in the Shandong delta alone.

== See also ==
- Ecoregions in China
