= Tibetan Plateau alpine shrublands and meadows =

Type of regional vegetation

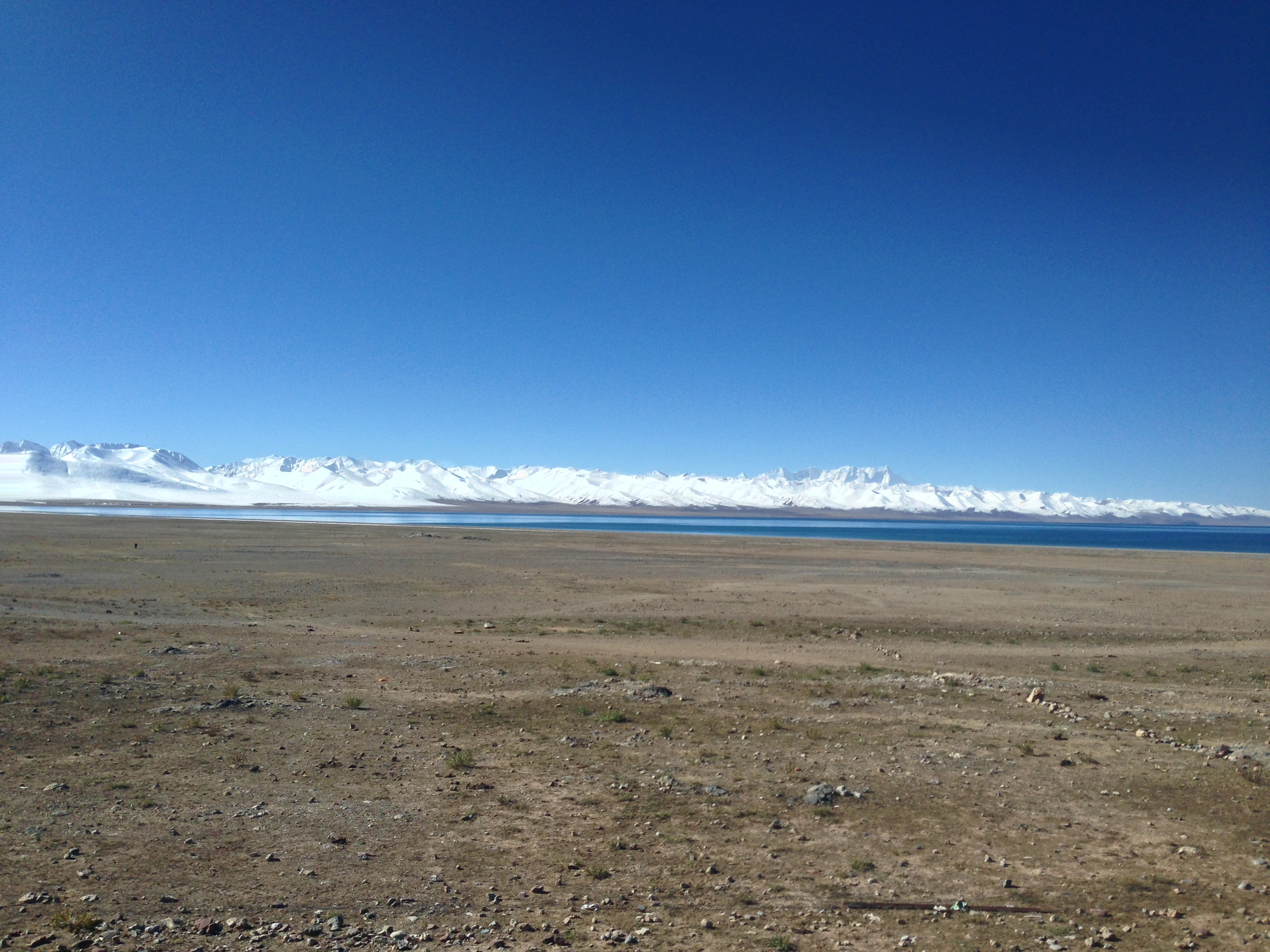
- Damxung, Lhasa, Tibet, China

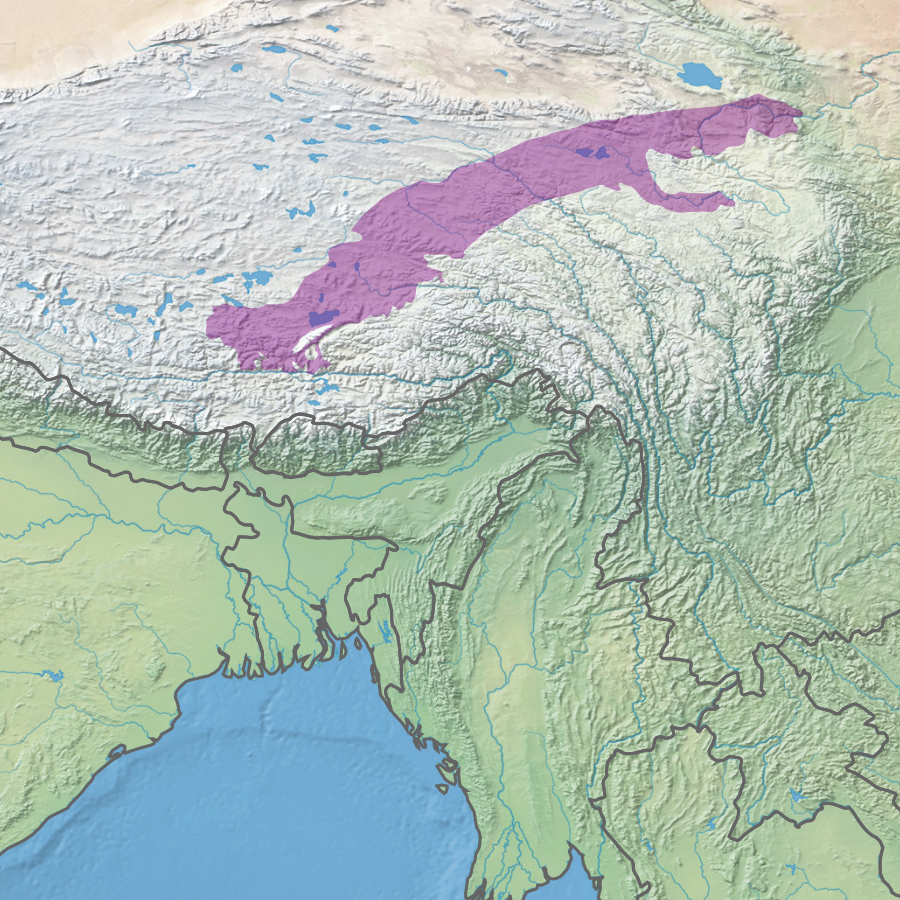
- Ecoregion territory (in purple)

Ecology
- Realm: Palearctic
- Biome: Montane grasslands and shrublands

Geography
- Area: 272,208 km^{2} (105,100 sq mi)
- Country: China
- Coordinates: 33°45′N 94°45′E

The Tibetan Plateau alpine shrublands and meadows ecoregion covers the middle transition zone between the northern and southern regions of the Tibetan Plateau. The region supports both cold alpine steppe and meadows across a broad expanse of the plateau. Wild deer, antelope, and sheep roam the grasslands, but the habitat is increasingly being used to graze domestic livestock.

== Location and description ==
The region is about 1,500 km long and 250 km wide, stretching from the Yarlung Tsangpo river valley in Tibet in the southwest, to the Qilian Mountains of Gansu Province in the northeast. The strip of land forms a high plain over 4,000 meters in elevation. The plateau is inclined slightly from northwest to southeast. Both the Yellow River and the Yangtze River have their headwaters in the eastern extent of this ecoregion.

== Climate ==
The climate of the ecoregion is Cold semi-arid climate (Köppen climate classification BSk). This climate is characteristic of steppe climates intermediary between desert humid climates, and typically have precipitation above evapotranspiration. At least one month has an average temperature below 0 °C (32 °F).

== Flora and fauna ==
Because the eastern parts of the ecoregion are somewhat lower in altitude, and the precipitation slightly higher, the plant communities grade from cold alpine steppe in the west to wet meadows in the east. The meadows are mostly sedges - Kobresia and black spike sedge (Carex atrata). North-facing slopes, which receive more snow and are more protected from cold winds in winter, support in some places juniper and rhododendron. Above 5,000 meters much of the terrain is barren of life.

The meadows support herds of the vulnerable Thorold's deer (Cervus albirostris), Kiang (Equus kiang), the near-threatened Goa (Procapra picticaudata), and Bharal (Pseudois nayaur) (also called blue sheep). These large mammals have been declining in number, and the habitat is under pressure from increased grazing by domestic livestock.

== See also ==
- List of ecoregions in China
