= Emil (river) =

River of China and Kazakhstan

Location
- Country: China, Kazakhstan

Physical characteristics
- Mouth: Lake Alakol
  - coordinates: 46°22′03″N 81°56′42″E
- Length: 250 km (160 mi)

The Emil (Kazakh: Еміл, Emıl; Russian: Эмель Emel) or Emin (Chinese: 额敏河; pinyin: Émǐn hé), also spelled Emel, Imil, etc., is a river in China and Kazakhstan. It flows through Tacheng (Tarbagatay) Prefecture of China's Xinjiang Uighur Autonomous Region and the East Kazakhstan Province of Kazakhstan, and is one of the principal affluents of Lake Alakol.

The Emil River is the principal watercourse of the Emin Valley, the plain bounded by the Tarbagatai Mountains in the north, the Barlyk Mountains (Chinese: 巴尔鲁克山; pinyin: Bā'ěrlǔkè Shān) in the southeast and Lake Alakol in the west. The Emil's headwaters are two streams, the Sary Emil ("Yellow Emil") and Kara Emil ("Black Emil"), which rise near the Sino-Kazakh border in the Tarbagatai Mountains, near the Tarbagatai's junction with the Saur. The two Emils flow in a west-south-western direction, eventually joining together, across Dörbiljin County (which is called in Chinese as Emin County, after the river). The river continues its flow to the west, the border of Tacheng City and Yumin County mostly following its course. The Emil crosses the Sino-Kazakh border at 46°29′35″N 82°43′30″E, and after a short stretch in Kazakhstan discharges into Lake Alakol, where it forms a small delta. The total length of the meandering river is estimated at 250 kilometres (160 mi), of which 180 kilometres (110 mi) is China and 70 kilometres (43 mi) in Kazakhstan.

Emin Town, the county seat of Emin County, is situated in the Emil River valley.

Similarly to the much larger and better known Ili, the Emil receives most of its water from the mountains on the Chinese side of the border and is an essential for the water balance of a major lake in Kazakhstan (the Alakol in case of the Emil, the Balkhash for the Ili). Accordingly, the management of its water within China is also of concern for Kazakhstan, and is a subject of interaction between the authorities of the two countries.
