= Allium polyrhizum =

Scientific classification
- Kingdom: Plantae
- Clade: Tracheophytes
- Clade: Angiosperms
- Clade: Monocots
- Order: Asparagales
- Family: Amaryllidaceae
- Subfamily: Allioideae
- Genus: Allium
- Subgenus: A. subg. Rhizirideum
- Species: A. polyrhizum

Binomial name
- Allium polyrhizum Turcz. ex Regel

Synonyms
- Allium polyrhizum var. przewalskii Regel

Species of flowering plant

Allium polyrhizum is a species of wild onion widespread across Zabaykalsky Krai, Kazakhstan, Mongolia, and China (Gansu, Hebei, Heilongjiang, Jilin, Liaoning, Inner Mongolia, Ningxia, Qinghai, Shaanxi, Shanxi and Xinjiang) at elevations 1000–3700 m.

Allium polyrhizum produces clumps of many narrowly cylindrical bulbs, each generally less than 10 cm in diameter. Scape is up to 30 cm long, round in cross-section. Leaves are tubular, less than 1 cm across, shorter than the scape. Umbel is hemispheric with many densely packed flowers. Tepals are usually pink or purple but occasionally white, either way with a green midvein.
