= Central China loess plateau mixed forests =

Ecoregion in North-Central China

Central China Loess Plateau Mixed Forests
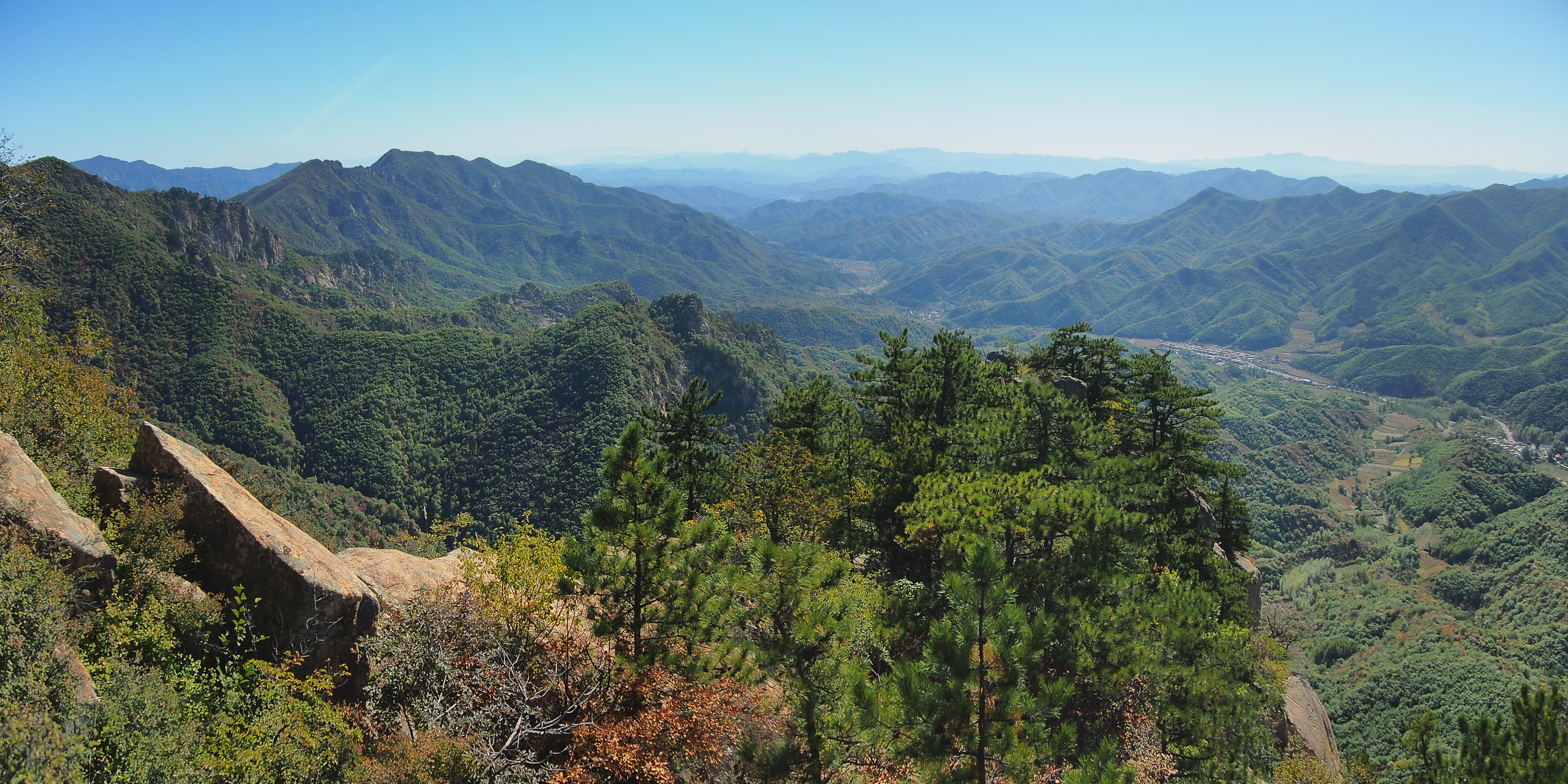
- Central China Loess Plateau Mixed Forests

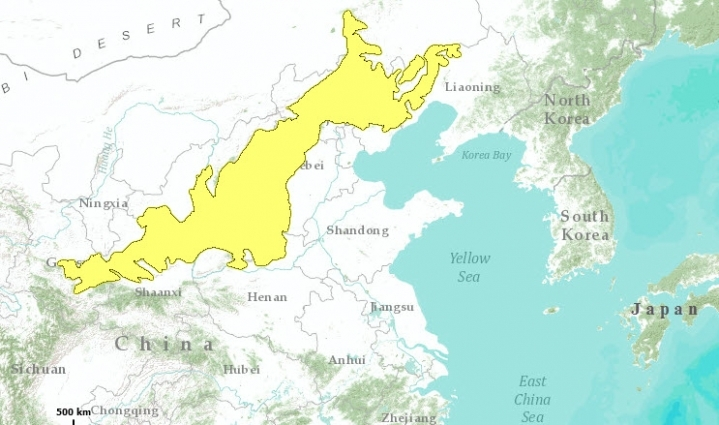
- Ecoregion territory (in yellow)

Ecology
- Realm: Palearctic
- Biome: Temperate broadleaf and mixed forest

Geography
- Area: 359,867 km^{2} (138,945 sq mi)
- Countries: China
- Coordinates: 37°00′N 112°45′E
- Soil types: Loess

The Central China Loess Plateau Mixed Forests ecoregion (WWF ID: PA0411) covers an elongated plateau across north-central China, characterized by accumulated soils of wind-blown dust known as loess and glacial till. The yellowish soil imparts its color to the Yellow River and Yellow Sea downstream. The ecoregion is located west of the lower Yellow River basin and the North China Plain.

== Location and description ==
The ecoregion runs about 1,600 km from southwest to northeast, and is about 300 km wide. The loess soil is up to 200 meters thick, with the greatest depths in the southwest, where consolidated loess can be formed into mountains. Thinner deposits are in the northeast where the loess only fills basins. Because loess retains nutrients and water well, the soil can support vegetation through dry seasons.

== Climate ==
The climate of the ecoregion is Humid continental climate, warm summer (Köppen climate classification (Dwb)), with a dry winter. This climate is characterized by large seasonal temperature differentials and a warm summer (at least four months averaging over 10 °C (50 °F), but no month averaging over 22 °C (72 °F), and cold winters having monthly precipitation less than one-tenth of the wettest summer month.

== Flora and fauna ==
The plateau supports mixed deciduous broadleaf forests in the northern and eastern areas, although vegetation gets more sparse and poor towards the southwest. Conversion of forest to agriculture over time has led to erosion and loss of vegetation, which has been severe in some areas. The general belief is that the area was once heavily forested with tall trees, however recent research suggests that much of the area may have been grassland at times in the past 20,000 years.

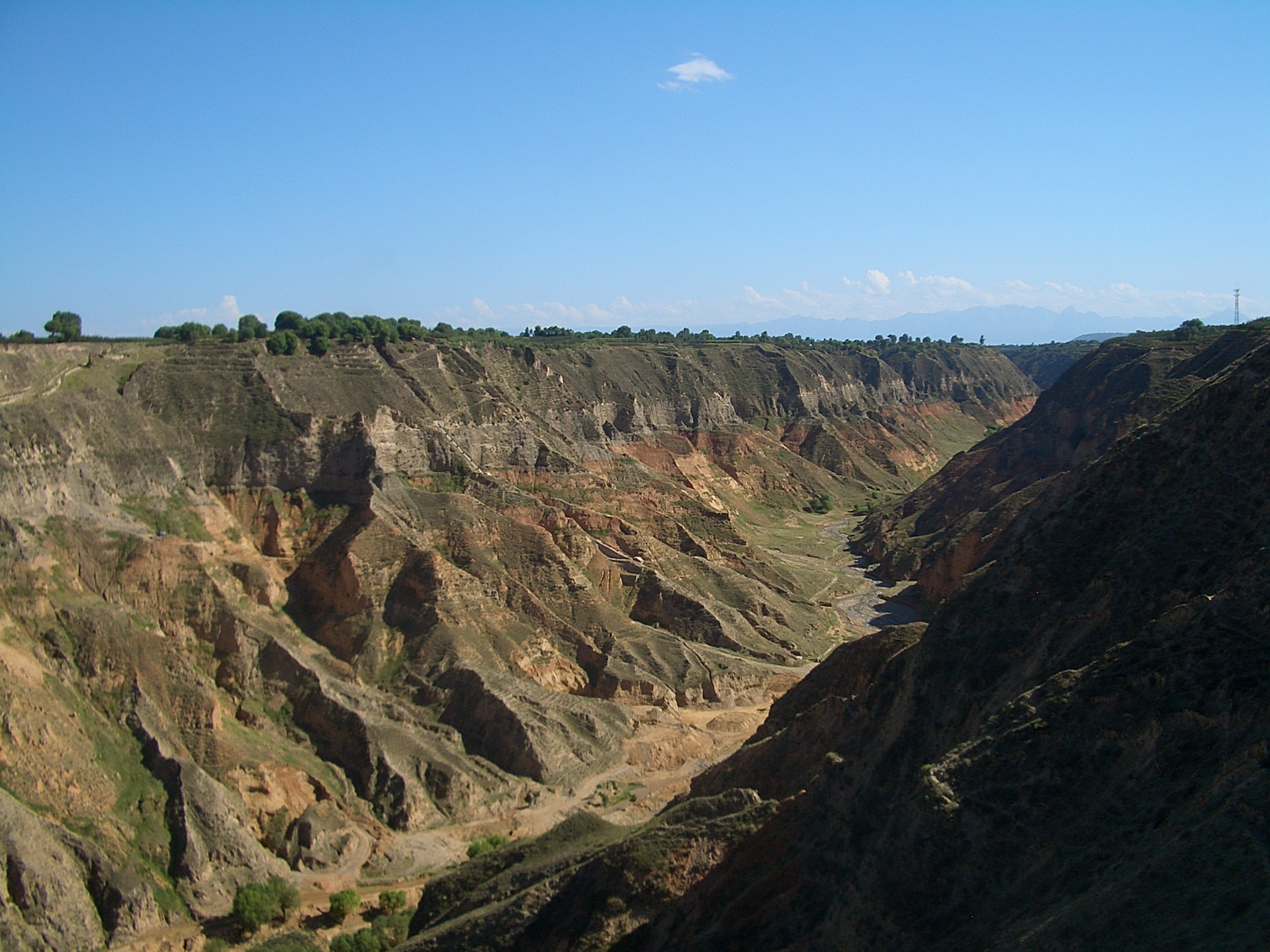
A canyon formed in the soft loess soil, Linxia County

== Conservation ==
Since the 1950s the government has heavily supported tree-planting programs for erosion control in the region, converting unproductive agricultural land on steep slopes to forest. A 2017 estimate approximated that 17,299 square kilometers of the region are in protected areas, including the Lishan National Nature Reserve in Guangxi, and the Luyashan National and the Pangquangou National Nature Reserves in Shanxi.
