= Tian Shan foothill arid steppe =

Ecoregion in the Tian Shan Mountains

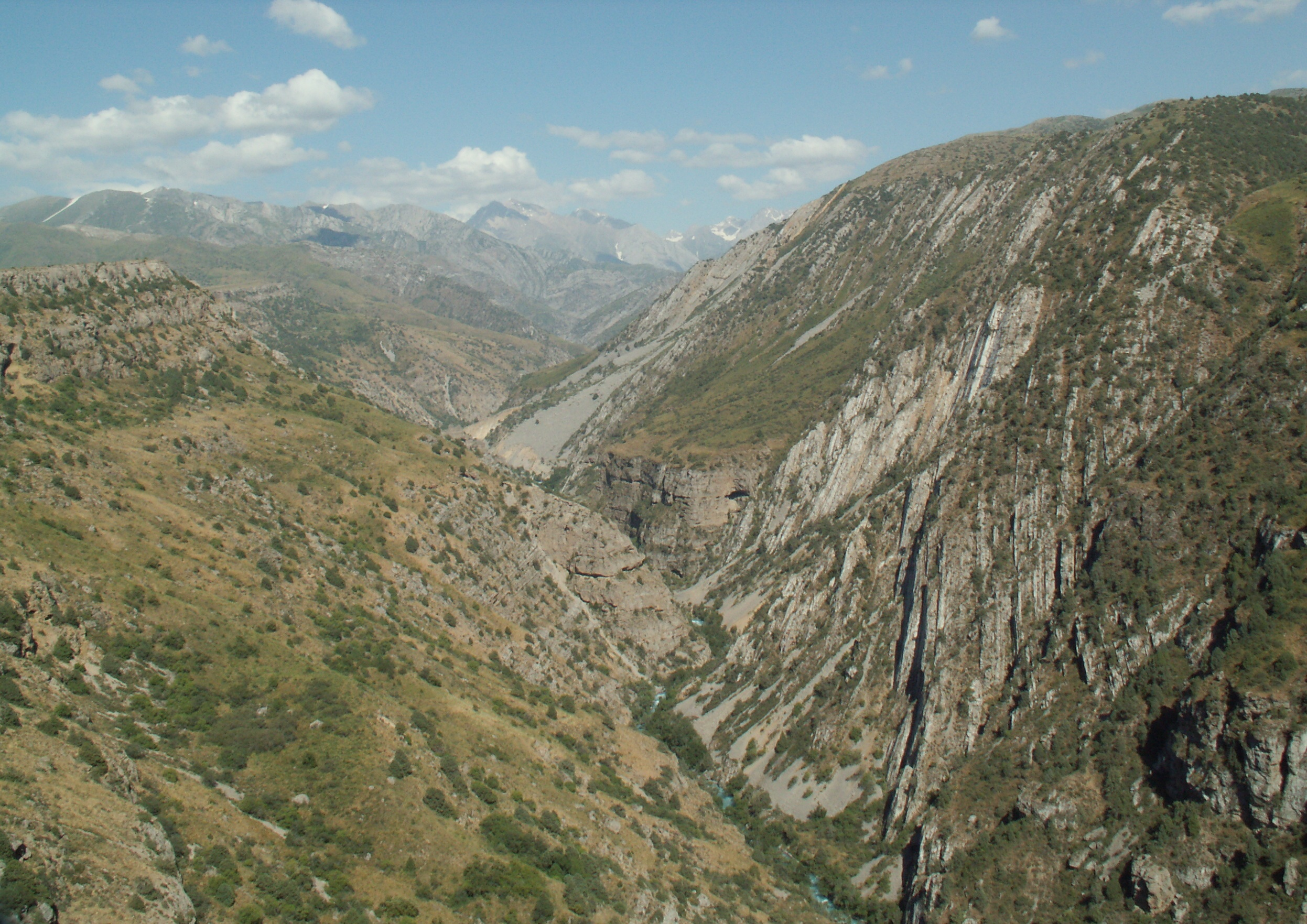
- Aksu Canyon, Kazakhstan

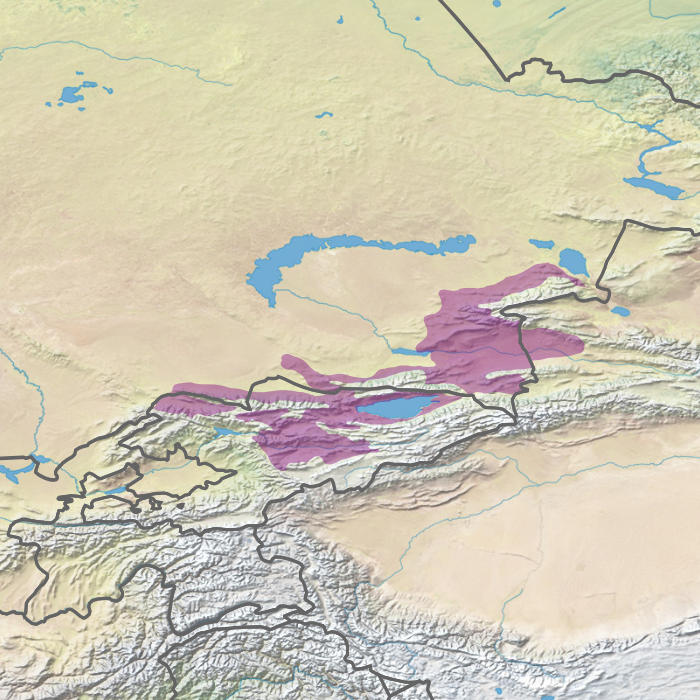
- Ecoregion territory (in purple)

Ecology
- Realm: Palearctic
- Biome: Temperate grasslands, savannas, and shrublands

Geography
- Area: 129,000 km^{2} (50,000 sq mi)
- Countries: Kazakhstan, Kyrgyzstan, China
- Coordinates: 43°30′N 79°00′E

The Tian Shan foothill arid steppe ecoregion (WWF ID: PA0818) covers the northern and western approaches to the Tian Shan mountains, centered on Lake Issyk-Kul in Kyrgyzstan. This region receives more moisture from Central Asia, thereby supporting more vegetation and diversity of plant and animal species than the deserts to the south.

== Location and description ==
The ecoregion stretches around the lower altitudes of the Tian Shan mountain ridge, running for approximately 1,000 km from western Kyrgyzstan to a small section inside the western reaches of Xinjiang Province in China. The foothills of the northwestern Tian Shan are a series of ridges and lake basins in this region. Elevations for this ecoregion are 150 - 660 meters.

== Climate ==
Several different climate classifications are represented in the ecoregion, both semi-arid and humid. The most widespread in the northeast is cold semi-arid (Köppen climate classification (BSk)). This climate is generally characterized as having precipitation greater than a true desert, and also a colder temperature. The western areas of the ecoregion, and the closer areas to the main ridge, are warmer, particularly in the summer, with high temperatures above 32 degrees C in July.

== Flora and fauna ==
The semi-desert of the lower foothills feature Fescue (Festuca) and feather grass (Stipa), with sagebrush and similar shrubs (genus Artemisia), and salt-tolerant tamarisk (Tamarix). Common mammals include red fox, corsac fox, wolf, steppe cat, weasels, ferrets, and various voles and shrews.

== See also ==
- Ecoregions in China
