= Kazakh semi-desert =

Ecoregion in Kazakhstan

Ecoregion: Kazakh semi-desert
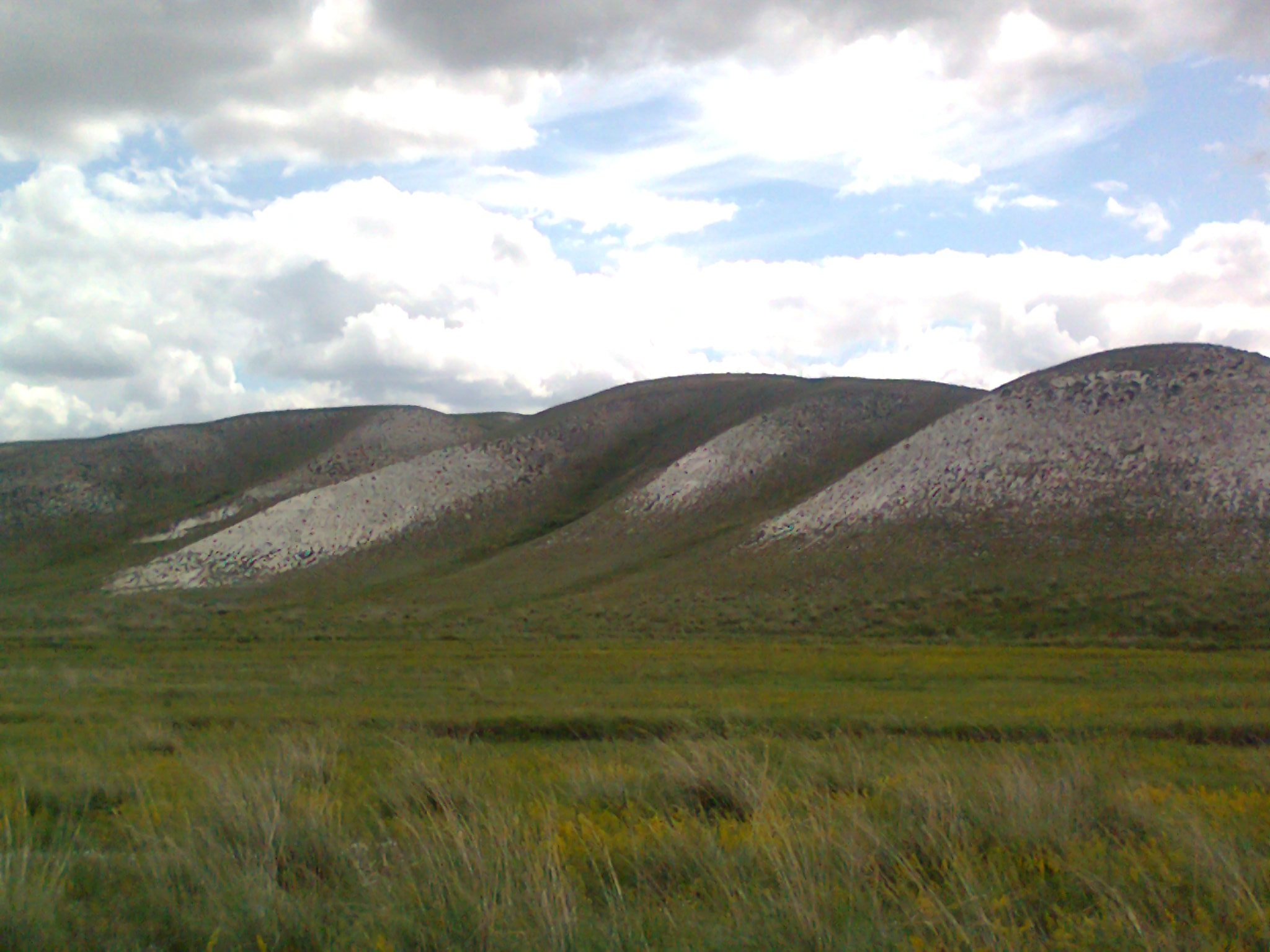
- Landscape in West Kazakhstan Region

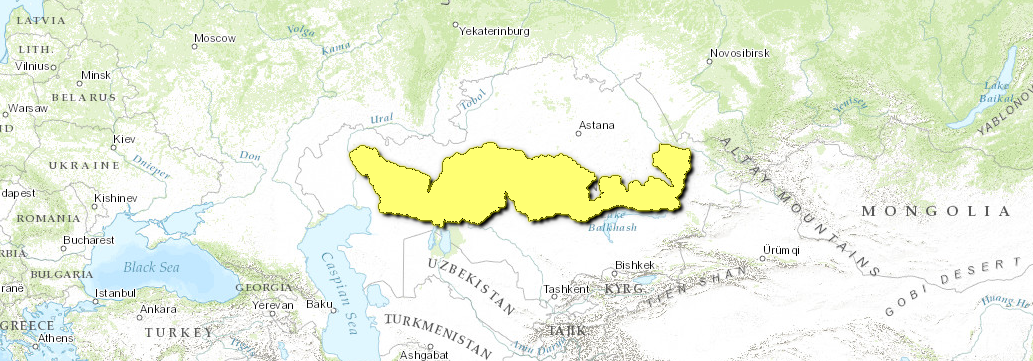
- Ecoregion territory (in yellow)

Ecology
- Realm: Palearctic
- Biome: Deserts and xeric shrublands

Geography
- Area: 678,400 km^{2} (261,900 sq mi)
- Countries: Kazakhstan
- Coordinates: 48°40′N 63°6′E

The Kazakh semi-desert is an ecoregion in the deserts and xeric shrublands biome, located in Kazakhstan. The climate is semi-arid and continental, with a total annual precipitation of 160 millimetres (6.3 in), and mean temperatures in January averaging −15 °C (5 °F) and in July 23 °C (73 °F). It is a transitional area between the steppes and the deserts of Central Asia and supports flora found in both biomes, predominantly grasses, particularly Stipa species, and shrubs such as Artemisia species. A number of mammals and birds are found in this ecoregion but the habitat is threatened by overgrazing and fragmentation from human encroachment. However, a recent reduction in livestock numbers in Kazakhstan is allowing the native plants a greater opportunity to regenerate.

== Setting ==
The Kazakh semi-desert is an ecotone between the Kazakh Steppe to the north and the Central Asian northern desert to the south, running in a band across central Kazakhstan. The climate here is semi-arid and highly continental. Precipitation averages between 160 millimetres (6.3 in) and 240 millimetres (9.4 in) annually. Mean temperatures in January range from −13 °C (9 °F) and −16 °C (3 °F), while July means are between 21 °C (70 °F) and 24 °C (75 °F). Annual average temperatures are around 10 °C (50 °F). The region's topography consists of vast, flat plains and salt flats broken by dissected plateaus (known locally as "melkosopochniki").

== Flora ==
As a transition between steppes and deserts of Central Asia, this ecoregion supports flora found in both biomes. Grasses, more dominant in the north, include various Stipa species (S. lessingiana, S. sareptana, S. kirghisorum and the endemic S. richterana) and tipchak (Festuca valesiaca). To the south, shrubs come to dominate, mainly Artemisia species (A. lerchena and A. lessingiana, A. gracilescens, A. sublessingiana, A. terrae albae semiarida and A. sublessingiana). Vegetation on the saline plains consists of Artemisia pauciflora, A. schrenkiana, A. nitrosa, Atriplex cana, Anabasis salsa, and Camphorosma monspeliaca.

== Fauna ==
Mammals in the ecoregion include the critically endangered saiga antelope (Saiga tatarica), Karaganda argali (Ovis ammon collium), goitered gazelle (Gazella subgutterosa), Pallas's cat (Otocolobus manul), gray wolf (Canis lupus), European badger (Meles meles) and marbled polecat (Vormela peregusna). Przewalski's horse (Equus ferus przewalskii) is native to the ecoregion, but has not been seen in it since 1968.

Avian species include the common crane (Grus grus), demoiselle crane (Anthropoides virgo), red-headed bunting (Emberiza bruniceps), larks (Alaudidae), wheatears (Oenanthe), pipits (Anthus spp.), black-bellied sandgrouse (Pterocles orientalis), Pallas’s sandgrouse (Syrrhaptes paradoxus), steppe eagle (Aquila rapax), golden eagle (Aquila chrysaetos), peregrine falcon (Falco peregrinus) and the saker falcon (Falco cherrug).

== Conservation status and threats ==
Agriculture, overgrazing, and fragmentation of habitat from human encroachment are the main threats to this ecoregion's integrity, and its conservation status is listed as "critical/endangered". However, recent and dramatic reductions in the number of livestock in Kazakhstan have resulted in large areas having a greater chance for rehabilitation. No areas in this ecoregion are strictly protected, and some refuges do not adequately preserve local ecosystems.
