= Tarbagatai Mountains =

Mountain range straddling the China–Kazakhstan border

Tarbagatai
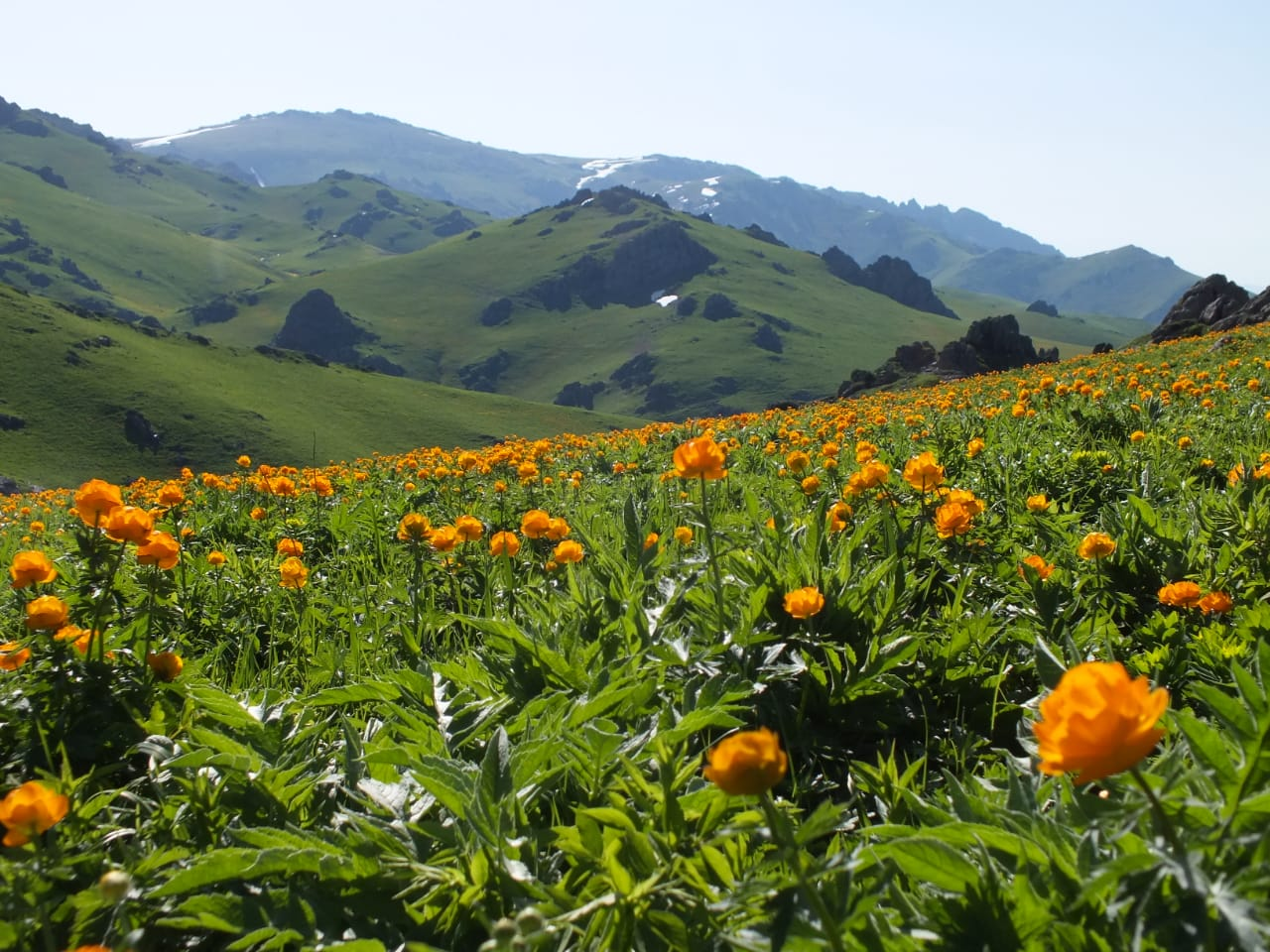

Highest point
- Coordinates: 47°11′18″N 82°27′59″E

Geography
- Location within Kazakhstan
- Location: China–Kazakhstan border
- Countries: China; Kazakhstan

Tarbagatai Mountains

Mongolian name
- Mongolian Cyrillic: Тарвагатай нуруу
- Mongolian script: ᠲᠠᠷᠪᠠᠭᠠᠲᠠᠢ ᠨᠢᠷᠤᠭᠤ
Transcriptions
- SASM/GNC: Tarvagatai nuruu

Chinese name
- Simplified Chinese: 塔尔巴哈台山
- Traditional Chinese: 塔爾巴哈台山
Transcriptions
Standard Mandarin
- Hanyu Pinyin: Tǎ'ěrbāhātái Shān

Kazakh name
- Kazakh: Тарбағатай жотасы Tarbaǵataı jotasy

The Tarbagatai Mountains are a mountain range straddling the China–Kazakhstan border, located in northwestern Xinjiang, China, and the Abai Region of East Kazakhstan. The name of the mountain derived from the Mongolian word tarvaga, meaning "marmot", with the suffix -tai, literally "to have" or "with". Tarbagan marmots live in this mountain range.

An eastern extension of the Tarbagatai is the Saur Mountains.

== Drainage ==
As is common for mountain ranges, there is more precipitation in the Tarbagatai mountains than in the adjacent flatlands. The mountains are thus an important watershed. Streams from the northern slopes of the Tarbagatai flow into Lake Zaysan, which eventually drains (via the Irtysh) into the Arctic Ocean. The streams of the southern slope, many of which merge into the Emil, flow into the Emin Valley, part of the endorheic Balkhash-Alakol Basin; they are an important source of water for several counties of Tacheng (Tarbagatay) Prefecture in China. The Urzhar has its sources in the range.
