= Qilian Mountains conifer forests =

Ecoregion in the Tibetan Plateau

Qilian Mountains Conifer Forests
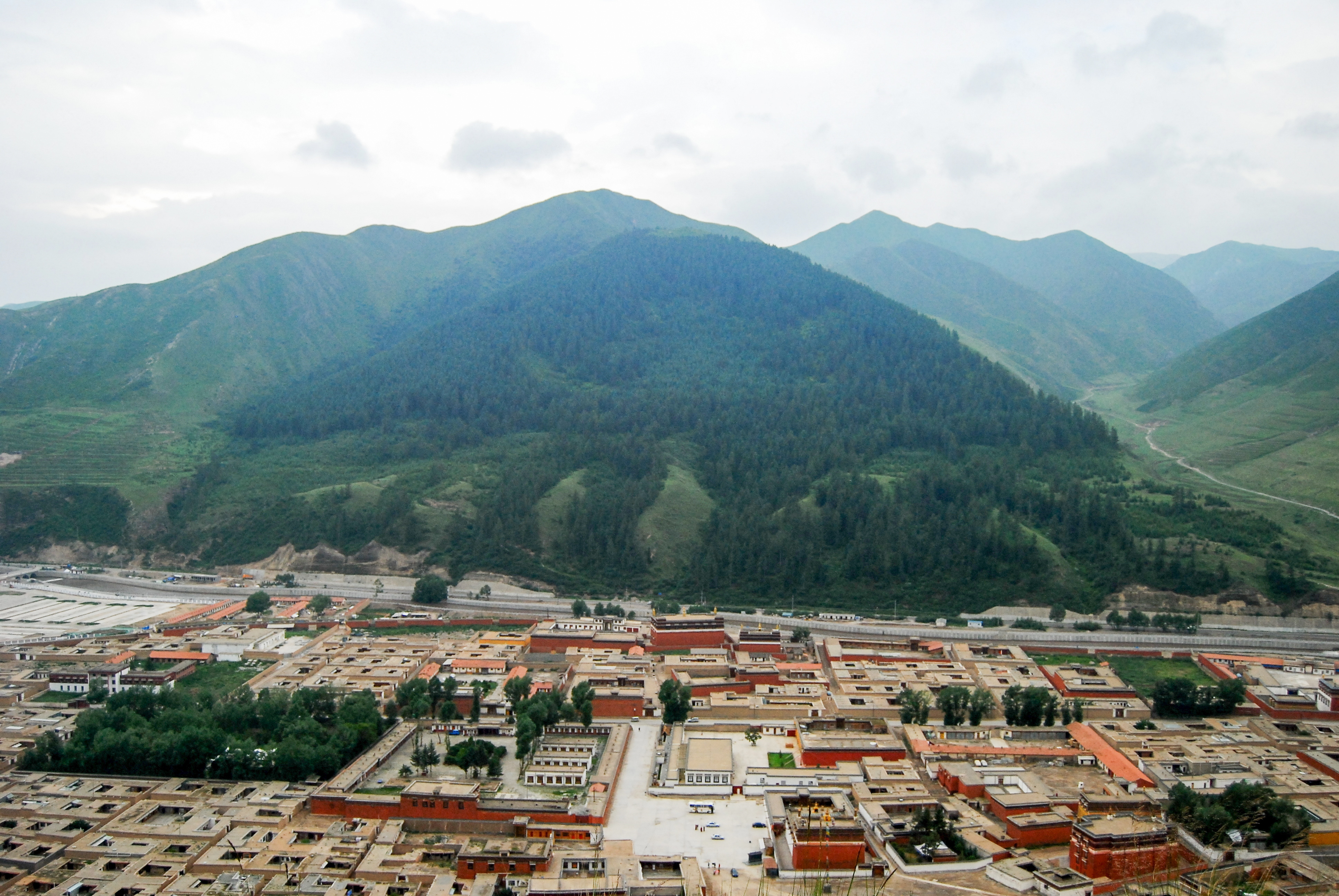
- Labrang Monastery, in Xiahe County in the ecoregion

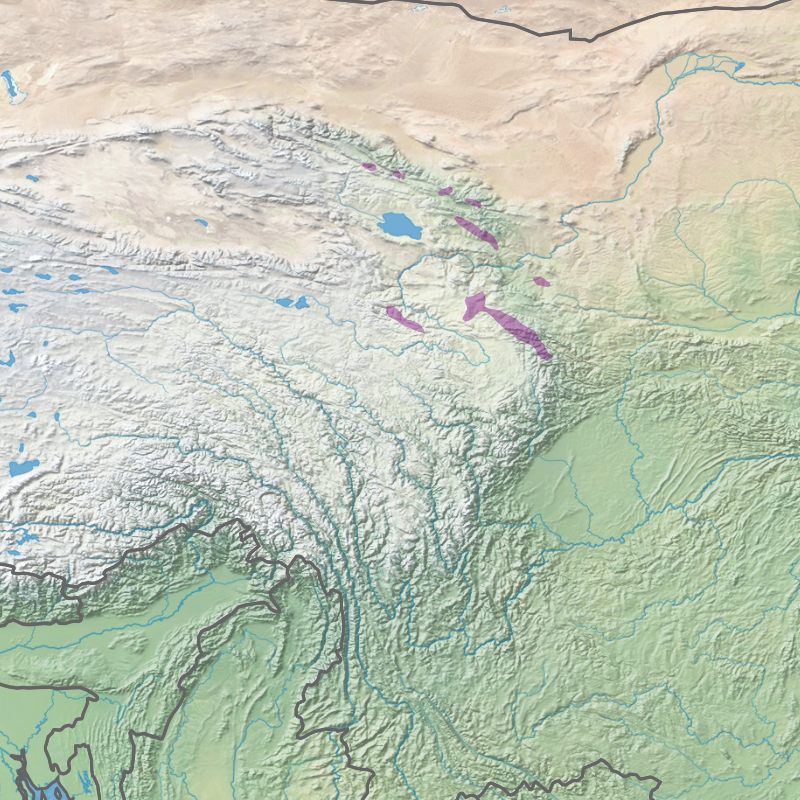
- Ecoregion territory (shown in purple)

Ecology
- Realm: Palearctic
- Biome: Temperate coniferous forest

Geography
- Area: 16,576 km^{2} (6,400 mi^{2})
- Countries: China
- Coordinates: 34.35°N 103.79°E

The Qilian Mountains Conifer Forests ecoregion (WWF ID: PA0517) is an ecoregion that consists of a series of isolated conifer forests on the northern slopes of the Qilian Mountain Range, on the northeast edge of the Tibetan Plateau in Qinghai and Gansu provinces of north-central China.

== Location and description ==
The scattered patches of this ecoregion are thin ridges of forest between the Gobi Desert to the north, and the dry and high Tibetan Plateau to the south. The surrounding areas are alpine meadows and scrub. The fragmented forests are found in isolated segments in the eastern Qilian Mountains, Daban Shan, the Amne Machin range, and Dié Shan. These segments are located in Qinghai and Gansu provinces.

== Climate ==
Because of its high elevation and mid-continental location, the ecoregion's climate is Subarctic climate, dry winter (Köppen climate classification Subarctic climate (Dwc)). This climate is characterized by mild summers (only 1–3 months above 10 °C or 50.0 °F) and cold winters having monthly precipitation less than one-tenth of the wettest summer month. The average temperatures range from −18 to −7 °C (0 to 19 °F) in January, and 5 to 21 °C (41 to 70 °F) in July.

== Flora and fauna ==
The dominant trees in the ecoregion are the Qilian spruce (Picea crassifolia), Przewalski's juniper (Juniperus przewalskii), Larix griffithii, Pinus roxburghii, Pinus hwangshanensis, Pinus yunnanensis, Juniperus tibetica, Shorea robusta, Olea europaea subsp. cuspidata, Taxus sumatrana, Tsuga dumosa, Alnus nepalensis, Betula alnoides, Betula utilis, Picea brachytyla, Juglans regia, Larix gmelinii, Larix sibirica, Larix × czekanowskii, Betula dahurica, Betula pendula, Pinus sibirica, Pinus sylvestris, Picea obovata, Abies sibirica, Quercus acutissima, Quercus mongolica, Ginkgo biloba, Prunus serrulata, Prunus padus, Tilia amurensis, Salix babylonica, Acer palmatum, Populus tremula, Ulmus davidiana, Ulmus pumila, Pinus pumila, Haloxylon ammodendron, Elaeagnus angustifolia, Tamarix ramosissima, Cathaya argyrophylla, Taiwania cryptomerioides, Cyathea spinulosa, Sassafras tzumu, Davidia involucrata, Metasequoia glyptostroboides, Glyptostrobus pensilis, Castanea mollissima, Quercus myrsinifolia, Quercus acuta, Machilus thunbergii, Tetracentron, Cercidiphyllum japonicum, Emmenopterys henryi, Eucommia ulmoides and Prunus sibirica. There are stands of short-stature bamboo in the understory. The relative isolation of the forests suggests that they may serve as habitat for a number of rare species of mammals, but the area is little studied and the presence of vulnerable species is unclear.
