= Daba Mountains evergreen forests =

Ecoregion in Daba Mountains, China

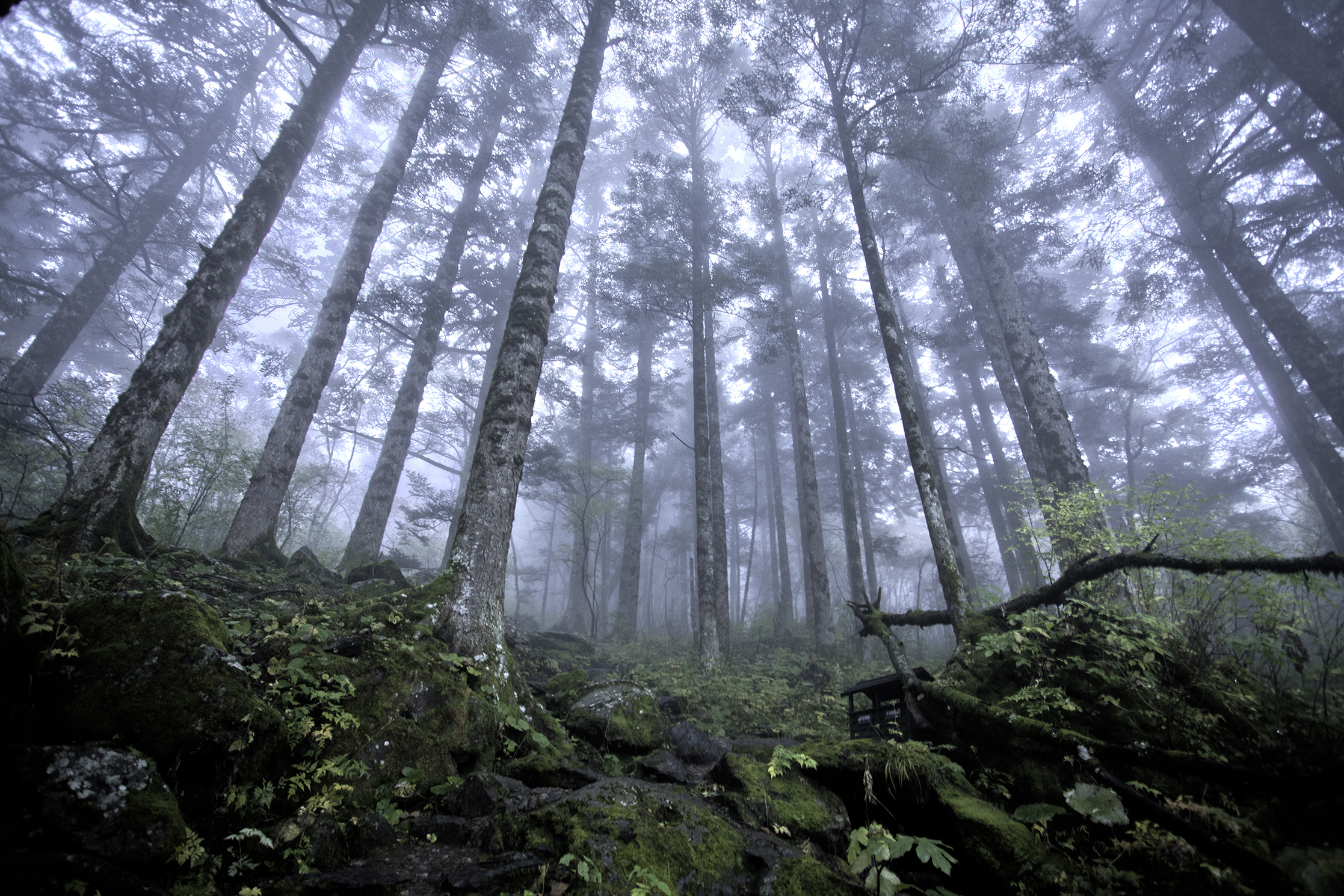
- Evergreen coniferous forest in Shennongjia

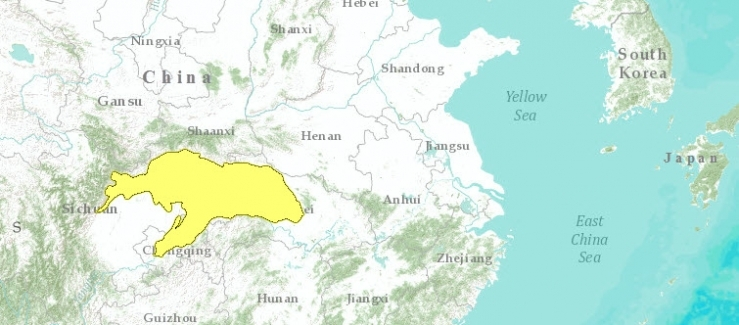
- Ecoregion territory (in yellow)

Ecology
- Realm: Palearctic
- Biome: Temperate broadleaf and mixed forests

Geography
- Country: China

Conservation
- Global 200: Yes

The Daba Mountains evergreen forests are a Global 200 endangered ecoregion located on the Daba Mountains in China. The forests are part of temperate broadleaf and mixed forests containing both coniferous and broadleaf trees covering a swath of Central China. Forests here provide a transitional area between evergreen forests to the south and deciduous forests to the north. The Daba Mountains evergreen forests cover areas of northeast Sichuan Province, southern Shaanxi Province, the northern half of Chongqing Municipality, and western Hubei Province.

The Daba Mountains evergreen forests support a wide variety of endemic species. Lower elevations contain oaks and arboreal mints, and higher elevations support pines including the Chinese red pine and Chinese white pine. Some of the other significant tree species include the dawn redwood, dove tree, Tetracentron, Cercidiphyllum japonicum, Emmenopterys henryi, and Eucommia ulmoides.

Industry in the region has long been dependent on logging and harvesting for medicines. A major protected area of forests is the Shennongjia National Nature Reserve in Hubei.
