= Emin Valley =

Ecoregion in China and Kazakhstan

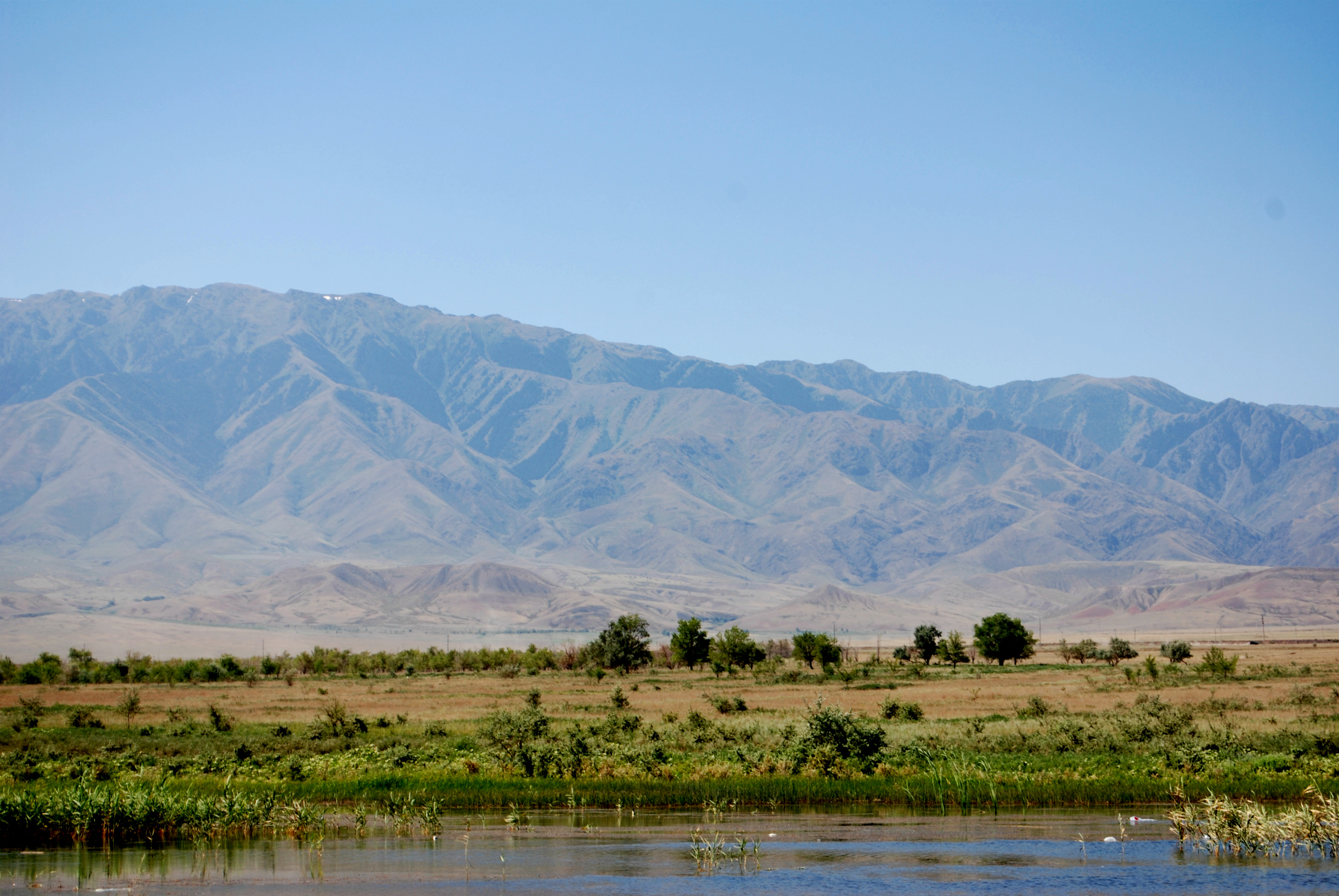
- Lake Alakol

- Location within Kazakhstan
- Area: 65,000 km^{2} (25,000 mi^{2})

Geography
- Coordinates: 47.5°N 82°E
- River: Emil River
- Interactive map of Emin Valley

Emin Valley
- Simplified Chinese: 额敏谷地
- Traditional Chinese: 額敏谷地
Transcriptions

The Emin Valley (Chinese: 额敏谷地; pinyin: Émǐn gǔdì) is located on the China–Kazakhstan border, in Central Asia. It has an area of about 65,000 square kilometres (25,000 mi^{2}). Its main waterway is the Emil River.

Administratively, the Emin Valley occupies areas of Tacheng Prefecture in the Xinjiang Region of north-western China and East Kazakhstan Province of eastern Kazakhstan.

== Ecology ==
The Emin Valley has a steppe ecosystem of mostly grasslands, with two saline lakes, Alakol and Sasykkol, and mountains with temperate climates.

The Emin Valley Steppe is a Palearctic ecoregion in the Temperate grasslands, savannas, and shrublands Biome. It lies within the vast and larger Eurasian Steppe.

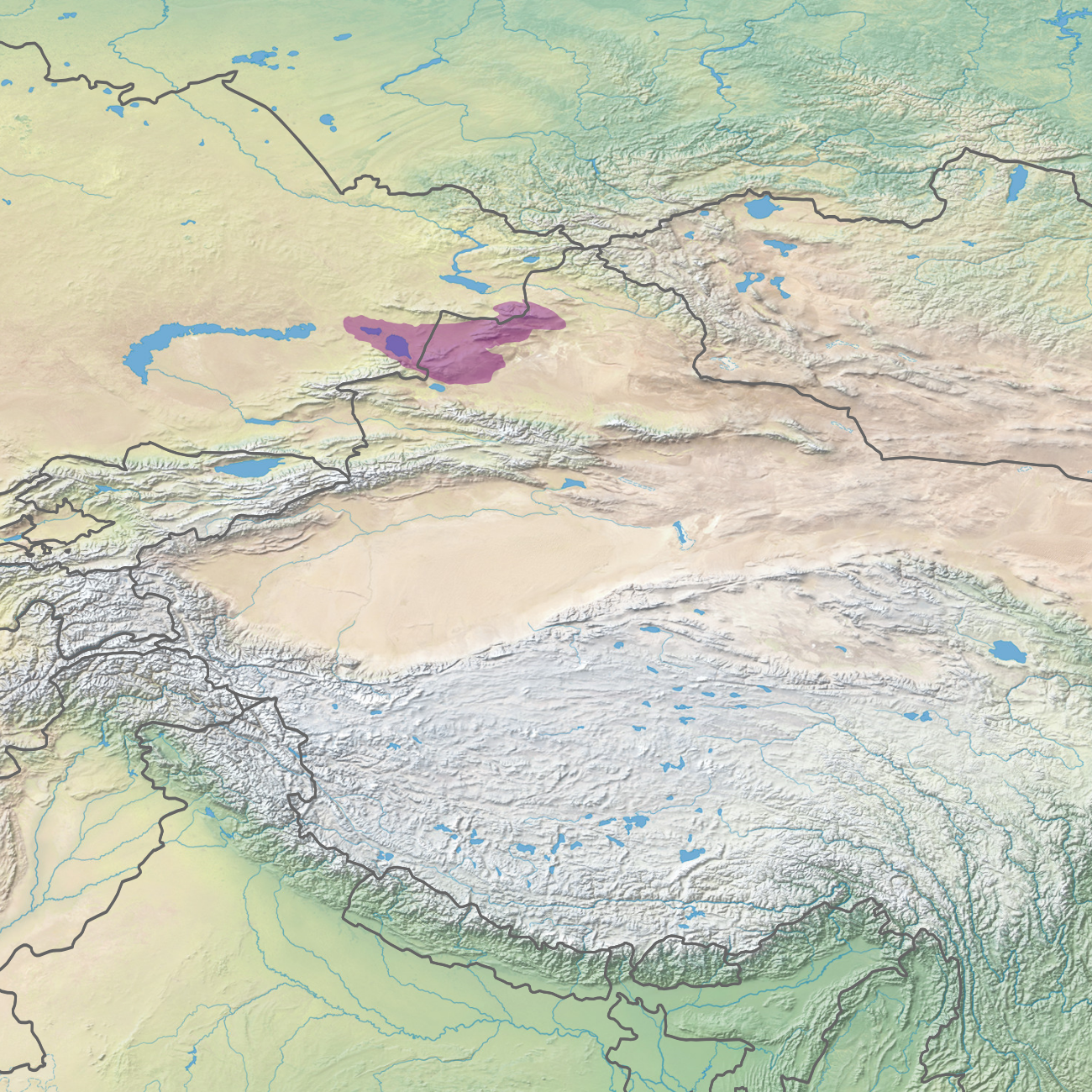
WWF ecoregion "Emin Valley" (PA0806) (in purple)

== Hydrology ==
Orographically, the Emil Valley is an endorrheic basin. In the north, the Tarbagatai Mountains separate it from the Lake Zaysan basin, which is part of the basin of the Irtysh River, eventually draining into the Arctic Ocean. In the southeast, another series of mountain ranges separate it from the Dzungarian Basin (Gurbantünggüt Desert).

The Emin Valley's main watercourse is the Emin (Emil) River, which flows in the general western direction, receiving numerous streams flowing from the Tarbagatai Mountains and carrying their water to Lake Alakol.

Lake Alakol and Lake Sasykkol, situated in the western (Kazakhstan) part of the valley, are the homes of the rare Dalmatian pelican and relict gull.

== See also ==
- Eurasian Steppe
- Temperate grasslands, savannas, and shrublands
