= List of terrestrial ecoregions (WWF) =

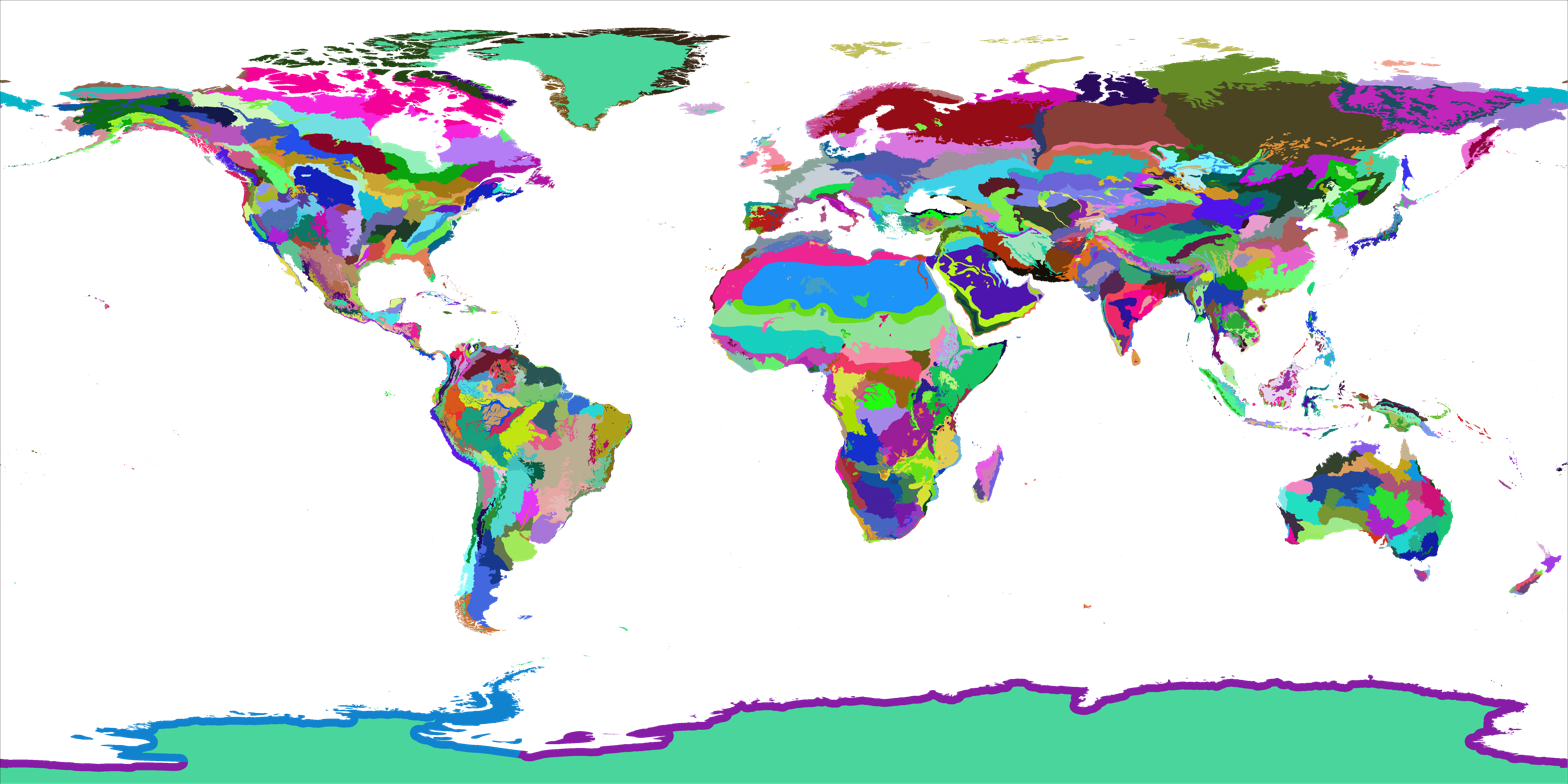
Terrestrial ecoregions of the world

This is a list of terrestrial ecoregions as compiled by the World Wildlife Fund (WWF). The WWF identifies terrestrial, freshwater, and marine ecoregions.

The terrestrial scheme divides the Earth's land surface into 8 biogeographic realms, containing 867 smaller ecoregions. Each ecoregion is classified into one of 14 major habitat types, or biomes.

In 2017 the WWF team revised ecosystem names and boundaries in the Arabian Peninsula, drier African regions, and Southeastern United States.

Realm	Biome	Ecoregion	Country/Territory
Afrotropical	Tropical and subtropical moist broadleaf forests	Albertine Rift montane forests	Burundi; DR Congo; Rwanda; Tanzania; Uganda
Afrotropical	Tropical and subtropical moist broadleaf forests	Atlantic Equatorial coastal forests	Cameroon; Congo, Republic of the; DR Congo; Equatorial Guinea; Gabon
Afrotropical	Tropical and subtropical moist broadleaf forests	Cameroonian Highlands forests	Cameroon; Nigeria
Afrotropical	Tropical and subtropical moist broadleaf forests	Central Congolian lowland forests	DR Congo
Afrotropical	Tropical and subtropical moist broadleaf forests	Comoros forests	Comoros; Mayotte
Afrotropical	Tropical and subtropical moist broadleaf forests	Cross–Niger transition forests	Nigeria
Afrotropical	Tropical and subtropical moist broadleaf forests	Cross–Sanaga–Bioko coastal forests	Cameroon; Equatorial Guinea; Nigeria
Afrotropical	Tropical and subtropical moist broadleaf forests	East African montane forests	Kenya; South Sudan; Tanzania; Uganda
Afrotropical	Tropical and subtropical moist broadleaf forests	Eastern Arc forests	Kenya; Tanzania
Afrotropical	Tropical and subtropical moist broadleaf forests	Eastern Congolian swamp forests	DR Congo
Afrotropical	Tropical and subtropical moist broadleaf forests	Eastern Guinean forests	Benin; Ivory Coast; Ghana; Togo
Afrotropical	Tropical and subtropical moist broadleaf forests	Ethiopian montane forests	Eritrea; Ethiopia; Somalia; Sudan
Afrotropical	Tropical and subtropical moist broadleaf forests	Granitic Seychelles forests	Seychelles
Afrotropical	Tropical and subtropical moist broadleaf forests	Guinean montane forests	Ivory Coast; Guinea; Liberia; Sierra Leone
Afrotropical	Tropical and subtropical moist broadleaf forests	Knysna–Amatole montane forests	South Africa
Afrotropical	Tropical and subtropical moist broadleaf forests	KwaZulu–Cape coastal forest mosaic	South Africa
Afrotropical	Tropical and subtropical moist broadleaf forests	Madagascar lowland forests	Madagascar
Afrotropical	Tropical and subtropical moist broadleaf forests	Madagascar subhumid forests	Madagascar
Afrotropical	Tropical and subtropical moist broadleaf forests	Maputaland coastal forest mosaic	Mozambique; South Africa; Eswatini
Afrotropical	Tropical and subtropical moist broadleaf forests	Mascarene forests	Mauritius; Réunion
Afrotropical	Tropical and subtropical moist broadleaf forests	Mount Cameroon and Bioko montane forests	Cameroon; Equatorial Guinea
Afrotropical	Tropical and subtropical moist broadleaf forests	Niger Delta swamp forests	Nigeria
Afrotropical	Tropical and subtropical moist broadleaf forests	Nigerian lowland forests	Benin; Nigeria
Afrotropical	Tropical and subtropical moist broadleaf forests	Northeastern Congolian lowland forests	Central African Republic; DR Congo
Afrotropical	Tropical and subtropical moist broadleaf forests	Northern Zanzibar–Inhambane coastal forest mosaic	Kenya; Somalia; Tanzania
Afrotropical	Tropical and subtropical moist broadleaf forests	Northwestern Congolian lowland forests	Cameroon; Central African Republic; Congo, Republic of the; DR Congo; Gabon
Afrotropical	Tropical and subtropical moist broadleaf forests	São Tomé, Príncipe, and Annobón forests	Equatorial Guinea; São Tomé and Príncipe
Afrotropical	Tropical and subtropical moist broadleaf forests	Southern Zanzibar–Inhambane coastal forest mosaic	Mozambique; Tanzania
Afrotropical	Tropical and subtropical moist broadleaf forests	Western Congolian swamp forests	Central African Republic; Congo, Republic of the; DR Congo
Afrotropical	Tropical and subtropical moist broadleaf forests	Western Guinean lowland forests	Ivory Coast; Guinea; Liberia; Sierra Leone
Afrotropical	Tropical and subtropical dry broadleaf forests	Cape Verde Islands dry forests	Cape Verde
Afrotropical	Tropical and subtropical dry broadleaf forests	Madagascar dry deciduous forests	Madagascar
Afrotropical	Tropical and subtropical dry broadleaf forests	Zambezian Cryptosepalum dry forests	Angola; Zambia
Afrotropical	Tropical and subtropical grasslands, savannas, and shrublands	Angolan miombo woodlands	Angola; DR Congo
Afrotropical	Tropical and subtropical grasslands, savannas, and shrublands	Angolan mopane woodlands	Angola; Namibia
Afrotropical	Tropical and subtropical grasslands, savannas, and shrublands	Ascension scrub and grasslands	Saint Helena, Ascension and Tristan da Cunha
Afrotropical	Tropical and subtropical grasslands, savannas, and shrublands	Central Zambezian miombo woodlands	Angola; Burundi; DR Congo; Malawi; Tanzania; Zambia
Afrotropical	Tropical and subtropical grasslands, savannas, and shrublands	East Sudanian savanna	Cameroon; Central African Republic; Chad; DR Congo; Eritrea; Ethiopia; Nigeria; South Sudan; Sudan; Uganda
Afrotropical	Tropical and subtropical grasslands, savannas, and shrublands	Eastern miombo woodlands	Malawi; Mozambique; Tanzania
Afrotropical	Tropical and subtropical grasslands, savannas, and shrublands	Guinean forest–savanna mosaic	Benin; Cameroon; Ivory Coast; Gambia; Ghana; Guinea; Guinea-Bissau; Liberia; Nigeria; Senegal; Sierra Leone; Togo
Afrotropical	Tropical and subtropical grasslands, savannas, and shrublands	Itigi–Sumbu thicket	DR Congo; Tanzania; Zambia
Afrotropical	Tropical and subtropical grasslands, savannas, and shrublands	Kalahari acacia–baikiaea woodlands	Botswana; Namibia; South Africa; Zimbabwe
Afrotropical	Tropical and subtropical grasslands, savannas, and shrublands	Mandara Plateau mosaic	Cameroon; Nigeria
Afrotropical	Tropical and subtropical grasslands, savannas, and shrublands	Northern Acacia–Commiphora bushlands and thickets	Ethiopia; Kenya; South Sudan; Tanzania; Uganda
Afrotropical	Tropical and subtropical grasslands, savannas, and shrublands	Northern Congolian forest–savanna mosaic	Cameroon; Central African Republic; DR Congo; South Sudan; Uganda
Afrotropical	Tropical and subtropical grasslands, savannas, and shrublands	Sahelian Acacia savanna	Burkina Faso; Cameroon; Central African Republic; Chad; Eritrea; Ethiopia; Mali; Mauritania; Niger; Nigeria; Senegal; South Sudan; Sudan
Afrotropical	Tropical and subtropical grasslands, savannas, and shrublands	Serengeti volcanic grasslands	Tanzania
Afrotropical	Tropical and subtropical grasslands, savannas, and shrublands	Somali Acacia–Commiphora bushlands and thickets	Eritrea; Ethiopia; Kenya; Somalia; Sudan; Tanzania
Afrotropical	Tropical and subtropical grasslands, savannas, and shrublands	Southern Acacia–Commiphora bushlands and thickets	Kenya; Tanzania; Uganda
Afrotropical	Tropical and subtropical grasslands, savannas, and shrublands	Southern Africa bushveld	Botswana; Mozambique; South Africa; Zimbabwe
Afrotropical	Tropical and subtropical grasslands, savannas, and shrublands	Southern Congolian forest–savanna mosaic	Angola; DR Congo
Afrotropical	Tropical and subtropical grasslands, savannas, and shrublands	Southern miombo woodlands	Malawi; Mozambique; Zambia; Zimbabwe
Afrotropical	Tropical and subtropical grasslands, savannas, and shrublands	Saint Helena scrub and woodlands	Saint Helena, Ascension and Tristan da Cunha
Afrotropical	Tropical and subtropical grasslands, savannas, and shrublands	Victoria Basin forest–savanna mosaic	Burundi; DR Congo; Ethiopia; Kenya; Rwanda; South Sudan; Tanzania; Uganda
Afrotropical	Tropical and subtropical grasslands, savannas, and shrublands	West Sudanian savanna	Benin; Burkina Faso; Ivory Coast; Gambia; Ghana; Guinea; Mali; Mauritania; Niger; Nigeria; Senegal; Togo
Afrotropical	Tropical and subtropical grasslands, savannas, and shrublands	Western Congolian forest–savanna mosaic	Angola; Congo, Republic of the; DR Congo; Gabon
Afrotropical	Tropical and subtropical grasslands, savannas, and shrublands	Western Zambezian grasslands	Angola; Zambia
Afrotropical	Tropical and subtropical grasslands, savannas, and shrublands	Zambezian Baikiaea woodlands	Angola; Botswana; Namibia; Zambia; Zimbabwe
Afrotropical	Tropical and subtropical grasslands, savannas, and shrublands	Zambezian and mopane woodlands	Botswana; Malawi; Mozambique; Namibia; South Africa; Eswatini; Zambia; Zimbabwe
Afrotropical	Temperate grasslands, savannas, and shrublands	Al Hajar montane woodlands	Oman; United Arab Emirates
Afrotropical	Temperate grasslands, savannas, and shrublands	Amsterdam and Saint-Paul Islands temperate grasslands	French Southern Lands
Afrotropical	Temperate grasslands, savannas, and shrublands	Tristan da Cunha–Gough Islands shrub and grasslands	Saint Helena, Ascension and Tristan da Cunha
Afrotropical	Flooded grasslands and savannas	East African halophytics	Kenya; Tanzania
Afrotropical	Flooded grasslands and savannas	Etosha Pan halophytics	Namibia
Afrotropical	Flooded grasslands and savannas	Inner Niger Delta flooded savanna	Mali
Afrotropical	Flooded grasslands and savannas	Lake Chad flooded savanna	Cameroon; Chad; Niger; Nigeria
Afrotropical	Flooded grasslands and savannas	Saharan flooded grasslands	Ethiopia; South Sudan
Afrotropical	Flooded grasslands and savannas	Zambezian coastal flooded savanna	Mozambique
Afrotropical	Flooded grasslands and savannas	Zambezian flooded grasslands	Angola; Botswana; DR Congo; Malawi; Mozambique; Namibia; Tanzania; Zambia
Afrotropical	Flooded grasslands and savannas	Zambezian halophytics	Botswana; Zimbabwe
Afrotropical	Montane grasslands and shrublands	Angolan montane forest–grassland mosaic	Angola
Afrotropical	Montane grasslands and shrublands	Angolan Scarp savanna and woodlands	Angola
Afrotropical	Montane grasslands and shrublands	Drakensberg alti-montane grasslands and woodlands	Lesotho; South Africa
Afrotropical	Montane grasslands and shrublands	Drakensberg montane grasslands	Lesotho; South Africa; Eswatini
Afrotropical	Montane grasslands and shrublands	East African montane moorlands	Kenya; Tanzania; Uganda
Afrotropical	Montane grasslands and shrublands	Eastern Zimbabwe montane forest-grassland mosaic	Mozambique; Zimbabwe
Afrotropical	Montane grasslands and shrublands	Ethiopian montane grasslands and woodlands	Eritrea; Ethiopia; Sudan
Afrotropical	Montane grasslands and shrublands	Ethiopian montane moorlands	Ethiopia
Afrotropical	Montane grasslands and shrublands	Highveld grasslands	Lesotho; South Africa
Afrotropical	Montane grasslands and shrublands	Jos Plateau forest-grassland mosaic	Nigeria
Afrotropical	Montane grasslands and shrublands	Madagascar ericoid thickets	Madagascar
Afrotropical	Montane grasslands and shrublands	Maputaland–Pondoland bushland and thickets	South Africa
Afrotropical	Montane grasslands and shrublands	Rwenzori–Virunga montane moorlands	DR Congo; Rwanda; Uganda
Afrotropical	Montane grasslands and shrublands	South Malawi montane forest–grassland mosaic	Malawi
Afrotropical	Montane grasslands and shrublands	Southern Rift montane forest–grassland mosaic	Malawi; Mozambique; Tanzania; Zambia
Afrotropical	Mediterranean forests, woodlands, and scrub	Albany thickets	South Africa
Afrotropical	Mediterranean forests, woodlands, and scrub	Lowland fynbos and renosterveld	South Africa
Afrotropical	Mediterranean forests, woodlands, and scrub	Montane fynbos and renosterveld	South Africa
Afrotropical	Deserts and xeric shrublands	Aldabra Island xeric scrub	Seychelles
Afrotropical	Deserts and xeric shrublands	Arabian Peninsula coastal fog desert	Oman; Saudi Arabia; Yemen
Afrotropical	Deserts and xeric shrublands	East Saharan montane xeric woodlands	Chad; Sudan
Afrotropical	Deserts and xeric shrublands	Eritrean coastal desert	Djibouti; Eritrea
Afrotropical	Deserts and xeric shrublands	Djibouti xeric shrublands	Djibouti; Eritrea; Ethiopia; Somalia; Sudan
Afrotropical	Deserts and xeric shrublands	Gulf of Oman desert and semi-desert	Oman; United Arab Emirates
Afrotropical	Deserts and xeric shrublands	Hobyo grasslands and shrublands	Somalia
Afrotropical	Deserts and xeric shrublands	Ile Europa and Bassas da India xeric scrub	French Southern Lands
Afrotropical	Deserts and xeric shrublands	Kalahari xeric savanna	Botswana; Namibia; South Africa
Afrotropical	Deserts and xeric shrublands	Kaokoveld desert	Angola; Namibia
Afrotropical	Deserts and xeric shrublands	Madagascar spiny thickets	Madagascar
Afrotropical	Deserts and xeric shrublands	Madagascar succulent woodlands	Madagascar
Afrotropical	Deserts and xeric shrublands	Masai xeric grasslands and shrublands	Ethiopia; Kenya; South Sudan
Afrotropical	Deserts and xeric shrublands	Nama Karoo	Namibia; South Africa
Afrotropical	Deserts and xeric shrublands	Namib desert	Namibia
Afrotropical	Deserts and xeric shrublands	Namibian savanna woodlands	Angola; Namibia
Afrotropical	Deserts and xeric shrublands	Socotra Island xeric shrublands	Yemen
Afrotropical	Deserts and xeric shrublands	Somali montane xeric woodlands	Somalia
Afrotropical	Deserts and xeric shrublands	Southwestern Arabian foothills savanna	Oman; Saudi Arabia; Yemen
Afrotropical	Deserts and xeric shrublands	Southwestern Arabian montane woodlands	Saudi Arabia; Yemen
Afrotropical	Deserts and xeric shrublands	Succulent Karoo	Namibia; South Africa
Afrotropical	Mangrove	Central African mangroves	Angola; Cameroon; DR Congo; Equatorial Guinea; Gabon; Ghana; Nigeria
Afrotropical	Mangrove	East African mangroves	Kenya; Mozambique; Somalia; Tanzania
Afrotropical	Mangrove	Guinean mangroves	Ivory Coast; Gambia; Ghana; Guinea; Guinea-Bissau; Liberia; Senegal; Sierra Leone
Afrotropical	Mangrove	Madagascar mangroves	Madagascar
Afrotropical	Mangrove	Southern Africa mangroves	Mozambique; South Africa
Antarctic	Tundra	Marielandia Antarctic tundra	Antarctica
Antarctic	Tundra	Maudlandia Antarctic desert	Antarctica
Antarctic	Tundra	Scotia Sea Islands tundra	Bouvet Island; South Shetland Islands; South Georgia and the South Sandwich Islands
Antarctic	Tundra	Southern Indian Ocean Islands tundra	French Southern Lands; Heard Island and McDonald Islands; South Africa
Australasian	Tropical and subtropical moist broadleaf forests	Admiralty Islands lowland rain forests	Papua New Guinea
Australasian	Tropical and subtropical moist broadleaf forests	Banda Sea Islands moist deciduous forests	Indonesia
Australasian	Tropical and subtropical moist broadleaf forests	Biak–Numfoor rain forests	Indonesia
Australasian	Tropical and subtropical moist broadleaf forests	Buru rain forests	Indonesia
Australasian	Tropical and subtropical moist broadleaf forests	Central Range montane rain forests	Indonesia; Papua New Guinea
Australasian	Tropical and subtropical moist broadleaf forests	Halmahera rain forests	Indonesia
Australasian	Tropical and subtropical moist broadleaf forests	Huon Peninsula montane rain forests	Papua New Guinea
Australasian	Tropical and subtropical moist broadleaf forests	Lord Howe Island subtropical forests	Australia
Australasian	Tropical and subtropical moist broadleaf forests	Louisiade Archipelago rain forests	Papua New Guinea
Australasian	Tropical and subtropical moist broadleaf forests	New Britain–New Ireland lowland rain forests	Papua New Guinea
Australasian	Tropical and subtropical moist broadleaf forests	New Britain–New Ireland montane rain forests	Papua New Guinea
Australasian	Tropical and subtropical moist broadleaf forests	New Caledonia rain forests	New Caledonia
Australasian	Tropical and subtropical moist broadleaf forests	Norfolk Island subtropical forests	Norfolk Island
Australasian	Tropical and subtropical moist broadleaf forests	Northern New Guinea lowland rain and freshwater swamp forests	Indonesia; Papua New Guinea
Australasian	Tropical and subtropical moist broadleaf forests	Northern New Guinea montane rain forests	Indonesia; Papua New Guinea
Australasian	Tropical and subtropical moist broadleaf forests	Queensland tropical rain forests	Australia
Australasian	Tropical and subtropical moist broadleaf forests	Seram rain forests	Indonesia
Australasian	Tropical and subtropical moist broadleaf forests	Solomon Islands rain forests	Solomon Islands
Australasian	Tropical and subtropical moist broadleaf forests	Southeastern Papuan rain forests	Papua New Guinea
Australasian	Tropical and subtropical moist broadleaf forests	Southern New Guinea freshwater swamp forests	Indonesia; Papua New Guinea
Australasian	Tropical and subtropical moist broadleaf forests	Southern New Guinea lowland rain forests	Indonesia; Papua New Guinea
Australasian	Tropical and subtropical moist broadleaf forests	Sulawesi lowland rain forests	Indonesia
Australasian	Tropical and subtropical moist broadleaf forests	Sulawesi montane rain forests	Indonesia
Australasian	Tropical and subtropical moist broadleaf forests	Trobriand Islands rain forests	Papua New Guinea
Australasian	Tropical and subtropical moist broadleaf forests	Vanuatu rain forests	Solomon Islands; Vanuatu
Australasian	Tropical and subtropical moist broadleaf forests	Vogelkop montane rain forests	Indonesia
Australasian	Tropical and subtropical moist broadleaf forests	Vogelkop–Aru lowland rain forests	Indonesia
Australasian	Tropical and subtropical moist broadleaf forests	Yapen rain forests	Indonesia
Australasian	Tropical and subtropical dry broadleaf forests	Lesser Sundas deciduous forests	Indonesia
Australasian	Tropical and subtropical dry broadleaf forests	New Caledonia dry forests	New Caledonia
Australasian	Tropical and subtropical dry broadleaf forests	Sumba deciduous forests	Indonesia
Australasian	Tropical and subtropical dry broadleaf forests	Timor and Wetar deciduous forests	Indonesia; East Timor
Australasian	Temperate broadleaf and mixed forests	Chatham Island temperate forests	New Zealand
Australasian	Temperate broadleaf and mixed forests	Eastern Australian temperate forests	Australia
Australasian	Temperate broadleaf and mixed forests	Fiordland temperate forests	New Zealand
Australasian	Temperate broadleaf and mixed forests	Nelson Coast temperate forests	New Zealand
Australasian	Temperate broadleaf and mixed forests	North Island temperate forests	New Zealand
Australasian	Temperate broadleaf and mixed forests	Northland temperate kauri forests	New Zealand
Australasian	Temperate broadleaf and mixed forests	Rakiura Island temperate forests	New Zealand
Australasian	Temperate broadleaf and mixed forests	Richmond temperate forests	New Zealand
Australasian	Temperate broadleaf and mixed forests	Southeast Australia temperate forests	Australia
Australasian	Temperate broadleaf and mixed forests	Southland temperate forests	New Zealand
Australasian	Temperate broadleaf and mixed forests	Tasmanian Central Highland forests	Australia
Australasian	Temperate broadleaf and mixed forests	Tasmanian temperate forests	Australia
Australasian	Temperate broadleaf and mixed forests	Tasmanian temperate rain forests	Australia
Australasian	Temperate broadleaf and mixed forests	Westland temperate forests	New Zealand
Australasian	Tropical and subtropical grasslands, savannas, and shrublands	Arnhem Land tropical savanna	Australia
Australasian	Tropical and subtropical grasslands, savannas, and shrublands	Brigalow tropical savanna	Australia
Australasian	Tropical and subtropical grasslands, savannas, and shrublands	Cape York Peninsula tropical savanna	Australia
Australasian	Tropical and subtropical grasslands, savannas, and shrublands	Carpentaria tropical savanna	Australia
Australasian	Tropical and subtropical grasslands, savannas, and shrublands	Einasleigh Uplands savanna	Australia
Australasian	Tropical and subtropical grasslands, savannas, and shrublands	Kimberley tropical savanna	Australia
Australasian	Tropical and subtropical grasslands, savannas, and shrublands	Mitchell Grass Downs	Australia
Australasian	Tropical and subtropical grasslands, savannas, and shrublands	Trans-Fly savanna and grasslands	Indonesia; Papua New Guinea
Australasian	Tropical and subtropical grasslands, savannas, and shrublands	Victoria Plains tropical savanna	Australia
Australasian	Temperate grasslands, savannas, and shrublands	Canterbury–Otago tussock grasslands	New Zealand
Australasian	Temperate grasslands, savannas, and shrublands	Eastern Australia mulga shrublands	Australia
Australasian	Temperate grasslands, savannas, and shrublands	Southeast Australia temperate savanna	Australia
Australasian	Montane grasslands and shrublands	Australian Alps montane grasslands	Australia
Australasian	Montane grasslands and shrublands	Central Range sub-alpine grasslands	Indonesia; Papua New Guinea
Australasian	Montane grasslands and shrublands	Southland montane grasslands	New Zealand
Australasian	Tundra	Antipodes Subantarctic Islands tundra	Australia; New Zealand
Australasian	Mediterranean forests, woodlands, and scrub	Coolgardie woodlands	Australia
Australasian	Mediterranean forests, woodlands, and scrub	Esperance mallee	Australia
Australasian	Mediterranean forests, woodlands, and scrub	Eyre and York mallee	Australia
Australasian	Mediterranean forests, woodlands, and scrub	Jarrah-Karri forest and shrublands	Australia
Australasian	Mediterranean forests, woodlands, and scrub	Swan Coastal Plain scrub and woodlands	Australia
Australasian	Mediterranean forests, woodlands, and scrub	Mount Lofty woodlands	Australia
Australasian	Mediterranean forests, woodlands, and scrub	Murray-Darling woodlands and mallee	Australia
Australasian	Mediterranean forests, woodlands, and scrub	Naracoorte woodlands	Australia
Australasian	Mediterranean forests, woodlands, and scrub	Southwest Australia savanna	Australia
Australasian	Mediterranean forests, woodlands, and scrub	Southwest Australia woodlands	Australia
Australasian	Deserts and xeric shrublands	Carnarvon xeric shrublands	Australia
Australasian	Deserts and xeric shrublands	Central Ranges xeric scrub	Australia
Australasian	Deserts and xeric shrublands	Gibson Desert	Australia
Australasian	Deserts and xeric shrublands	Great Sandy-Tanami desert	Australia
Australasian	Deserts and xeric shrublands	Great Victoria Desert	Australia
Australasian	Deserts and xeric shrublands	Nullarbor Plains xeric shrublands	Australia
Australasian	Deserts and xeric shrublands	Pilbara shrublands	Australia
Australasian	Deserts and xeric shrublands	Simpson Desert	Australia
Australasian	Deserts and xeric shrublands	Tirari-Sturt Stony desert	Australia
Australasian	Deserts and xeric shrublands	Western Australian mulga shrublands	Australia
Australasian	Mangrove	New Guinea mangroves	Australia; Indonesia; Papua New Guinea
Indomalayan	Tropical and subtropical moist broadleaf forests	Andaman Islands rain forests	India
Indomalayan	Tropical and subtropical moist broadleaf forests	Borneo lowland rain forests	Brunei; Indonesia; Malaysia
Indomalayan	Tropical and subtropical moist broadleaf forests	Borneo montane rain forests	Brunei; Indonesia; Malaysia
Indomalayan	Tropical and subtropical moist broadleaf forests	Borneo peat swamp forests	Brunei; Indonesia; Malaysia
Indomalayan	Tropical and subtropical moist broadleaf forests	Brahmaputra Valley semi-evergreen forests	Bhutan; India
Indomalayan	Tropical and subtropical moist broadleaf forests	Cardamom Mountains rain forests	Cambodia; Thailand
Indomalayan	Tropical and subtropical moist broadleaf forests	Chao Phraya freshwater swamp forests	Thailand
Indomalayan	Tropical and subtropical moist broadleaf forests	Chao Phraya lowland moist deciduous forests	Thailand
Indomalayan	Tropical and subtropical moist broadleaf forests	Chin Hills–Arakan Yoma montane forests	Myanmar
Indomalayan	Tropical and subtropical moist broadleaf forests	Christmas and Cocos Islands tropical forests	Christmas Island; Cocos (Keeling) Islands
Indomalayan	Tropical and subtropical moist broadleaf forests	Eastern Java–Bali montane rain forests	Indonesia
Indomalayan	Tropical and subtropical moist broadleaf forests	Eastern Java–Bali rain forests	Indonesia
Indomalayan	Tropical and subtropical moist broadleaf forests	Eastern highlands moist deciduous forests	India
Indomalayan	Tropical and subtropical moist broadleaf forests	Greater Negros–Panay rain forests	Philippines
Indomalayan	Tropical and subtropical moist broadleaf forests	Hainan Island monsoon rain forests	China
Indomalayan	Tropical and subtropical moist broadleaf forests	Himalayan subtropical broadleaf forests	Bhutan; India; Nepal
Indomalayan	Tropical and subtropical moist broadleaf forests	Irrawaddy freshwater swamp forests	Myanmar
Indomalayan	Tropical and subtropical moist broadleaf forests	Irrawaddy moist deciduous forests	Myanmar
Indomalayan	Tropical and subtropical moist broadleaf forests	Jiang Nan subtropical evergreen forests	China
Indomalayan	Tropical and subtropical moist broadleaf forests	Kayah–Karen montane rain forests	Myanmar; Thailand
Indomalayan	Tropical and subtropical moist broadleaf forests	Lower Gangetic Plains moist deciduous forests	Bangladesh; India; Nepal
Indomalayan	Tropical and subtropical moist broadleaf forests	Luang Prabang montane rain forests	Laos; Thailand; Viet Nam
Indomalayan	Tropical and subtropical moist broadleaf forests	Luzon montane rain forests	Philippines
Indomalayan	Tropical and subtropical moist broadleaf forests	Luzon rain forests	Philippines
Indomalayan	Tropical and subtropical moist broadleaf forests	Malabar Coast moist forests	India
Indomalayan	Tropical and subtropical moist broadleaf forests	Maldives–Lakshadweep–Chagos Archipelago tropical moist forests	British Indian Ocean Territory; India; Maldives
Indomalayan	Tropical and subtropical moist broadleaf forests	Meghalaya subtropical forests	Bangladesh; India
Indomalayan	Tropical and subtropical moist broadleaf forests	Mentawai Islands rain forests	Indonesia
Indomalayan	Tropical and subtropical moist broadleaf forests	Mindanao montane rain forests	Philippines
Indomalayan	Tropical and subtropical moist broadleaf forests	Mindanao–Eastern Visayas rain forests	Philippines
Indomalayan	Tropical and subtropical moist broadleaf forests	Mindoro rain forests	Philippines
Indomalayan	Tropical and subtropical moist broadleaf forests	Mizoram–Manipur–Kachin rain forests	Bangladesh; India; Myanmar
Indomalayan	Tropical and subtropical moist broadleaf forests	Myanmar coastal rain forests	Myanmar
Indomalayan	Tropical and subtropical moist broadleaf forests	Nansei Islands subtropical evergreen forests	Japan
Indomalayan	Tropical and subtropical moist broadleaf forests	Nicobar Islands rain forests	India
Indomalayan	Tropical and subtropical moist broadleaf forests	North Western Ghats moist deciduous forests	India
Indomalayan	Tropical and subtropical moist broadleaf forests	North Western Ghats montane rain forests	India
Indomalayan	Tropical and subtropical moist broadleaf forests	Northern Annamites rain forests	Laos; Viet Nam
Indomalayan	Tropical and subtropical moist broadleaf forests	Northern Indochina subtropical forests	China; Laos; Myanmar; Thailand; Viet Nam
Indomalayan	Tropical and subtropical moist broadleaf forests	Northern Khorat Plateau moist deciduous forests	Laos; Thailand
Indomalayan	Tropical and subtropical moist broadleaf forests	Northern Thailand–Laos moist deciduous forests	Laos; Thailand
Indomalayan	Tropical and subtropical moist broadleaf forests	Northern Triangle subtropical forests	Myanmar
Indomalayan	Tropical and subtropical moist broadleaf forests	Northern Vietnam lowland rain forests	Viet Nam
Indomalayan	Tropical and subtropical moist broadleaf forests	Orissa semi-evergreen forests	India
Indomalayan	Tropical and subtropical moist broadleaf forests	Palawan rain forests	Philippines
Indomalayan	Tropical and subtropical moist broadleaf forests	Peninsular Malaysian montane rain forests	Malaysia; Thailand
Indomalayan	Tropical and subtropical moist broadleaf forests	Peninsular Malaysian peat swamp forests	Malaysia
Indomalayan	Tropical and subtropical moist broadleaf forests	Peninsular Malaysian rain forests	Indonesia; Malaysia; Singapore; Thailand
Indomalayan	Tropical and subtropical moist broadleaf forests	Red River freshwater swamp forests	Viet Nam
Indomalayan	Tropical and subtropical moist broadleaf forests	South China Sea Islands	China; Malaysia; Philippines; Taiwan; Viet Nam
Indomalayan	Tropical and subtropical moist broadleaf forests	South China–Vietnam subtropical evergreen forests	China; Hong Kong; Macau
Indomalayan	Tropical and subtropical moist broadleaf forests	South China-Vietnam subtropical evergreen forests	Viet Nam
Indomalayan	Tropical and subtropical moist broadleaf forests	South Taiwan monsoon rain forests	Taiwan
Indomalayan	Tropical and subtropical moist broadleaf forests	South Western Ghats moist deciduous forests	India
Indomalayan	Tropical and subtropical moist broadleaf forests	South Western Ghats montane rain forests	India
Indomalayan	Tropical and subtropical moist broadleaf forests	Southern Annamites montane rain forests	Cambodia; Laos; Viet Nam
Indomalayan	Tropical and subtropical moist broadleaf forests	Southwest Borneo freshwater swamp forests	Indonesia
Indomalayan	Tropical and subtropical moist broadleaf forests	Sri Lanka lowland rain forests	Sri Lanka
Indomalayan	Tropical and subtropical moist broadleaf forests	Sri Lanka montane rain forests	Sri Lanka
Indomalayan	Tropical and subtropical moist broadleaf forests	Sulu Archipelago rain forests	Philippines
Indomalayan	Tropical and subtropical moist broadleaf forests	Sumatran freshwater swamp forests	Indonesia
Indomalayan	Tropical and subtropical moist broadleaf forests	Sumatran lowland rain forests	Indonesia
Indomalayan	Tropical and subtropical moist broadleaf forests	Sumatran montane rain forests	Indonesia
Indomalayan	Tropical and subtropical moist broadleaf forests	Sumatran peat swamp forests	Indonesia
Indomalayan	Tropical and subtropical moist broadleaf forests	Sundaland heath forests	Indonesia; Malaysia
Indomalayan	Tropical and subtropical moist broadleaf forests	Sundarbans freshwater swamp forests	Bangladesh; India
Indomalayan	Tropical and subtropical moist broadleaf forests	Taiwan subtropical evergreen forests	Taiwan
Indomalayan	Tropical and subtropical moist broadleaf forests	Tenasserim–South Thailand semi-evergreen rain forests	Malaysia; Myanmar; Thailand
Indomalayan	Tropical and subtropical moist broadleaf forests	Tonle Sap freshwater swamp forests	Cambodia; Viet Nam
Indomalayan	Tropical and subtropical moist broadleaf forests	Tonle Sap-Mekong peat swamp forests	Cambodia; Viet Nam
Indomalayan	Tropical and subtropical moist broadleaf forests	Upper Gangetic Plains moist deciduous forests	India
Indomalayan	Tropical and subtropical moist broadleaf forests	Western Java montane rain forests	Indonesia
Indomalayan	Tropical and subtropical moist broadleaf forests	Western Java rain forests	Indonesia
Indomalayan	Tropical and subtropical dry broadleaf forests	Central Deccan Plateau dry deciduous forests	India
Indomalayan	Tropical and subtropical dry broadleaf forests	Central Indochina dry forests	Cambodia; Laos; Thailand; Viet Nam
Indomalayan	Tropical and subtropical dry broadleaf forests	Chota Nagpur dry deciduous forests	India
Indomalayan	Tropical and subtropical dry broadleaf forests	East Deccan dry evergreen forests	India
Indomalayan	Tropical and subtropical dry broadleaf forests	Irrawaddy dry forests	Myanmar
Indomalayan	Tropical and subtropical dry broadleaf forests	Khathiar–Gir dry deciduous forests	India
Indomalayan	Tropical and subtropical dry broadleaf forests	Narmada Valley dry deciduous forests	India
Indomalayan	Tropical and subtropical dry broadleaf forests	Northern dry deciduous forests	India
Indomalayan	Tropical and subtropical dry broadleaf forests	South Deccan Plateau dry deciduous forests	India
Indomalayan	Tropical and subtropical dry broadleaf forests	Southeastern Indochina dry evergreen forests	Cambodia; Laos; Thailand; Viet Nam
Indomalayan	Tropical and subtropical dry broadleaf forests	Southern Vietnam lowland dry forests	Viet Nam
Indomalayan	Tropical and subtropical dry broadleaf forests	Sri Lanka dry-zone dry evergreen forests	Sri Lanka
Indomalayan	Tropical and subtropical coniferous forests	Himalayan subtropical pine forests	Bhutan; India; Nepal; Pakistan; Philippines
Indomalayan	Tropical and subtropical coniferous forests	Luzon tropical pine forests	Philippines
Indomalayan	Tropical and subtropical coniferous forests	Northeast India–Myanmar pine forests	India; Myanmar
Indomalayan	Tropical and subtropical coniferous forests	Sumatran tropical pine forests	Indonesia
Indomalayan	Temperate broadleaf and mixed forests	Eastern Himalayan broadleaf forests	Bhutan; India; Nepal
Indomalayan	Temperate broadleaf and mixed forests	Northern Triangle temperate forests	Myanmar
Indomalayan	Temperate broadleaf and mixed forests	Western Himalayan broadleaf forests	India; Nepal; Pakistan
Indomalayan	Temperate coniferous forests	Eastern Himalayan subalpine conifer forests	Bhutan; China; India; Nepal
Indomalayan	Temperate coniferous forests	Western Himalayan subalpine conifer forests	Afghanistan; India; Nepal; Pakistan
Indomalayan	Tropical and subtropical grasslands, savannas, and shrublands	Terai–Duar savanna and grasslands	Bhutan; India; Nepal
Indomalayan	Flooded grasslands and savannas	Rann of Kutch seasonal salt marsh	India; Pakistan
Indomalayan	Montane grasslands and shrublands	Kinabalu montane alpine meadows	Malaysia
Indomalayan	Deserts and xeric shrublands	Deccan thorn scrub forests	India; Sri Lanka
Indomalayan	Deserts and xeric shrublands	Indus Valley desert	Pakistan
Indomalayan	Deserts and xeric shrublands	Northwestern thorn scrub forests	India; Pakistan
Indomalayan	Deserts and xeric shrublands	Thar desert	India; Pakistan
Indomalayan	Mangrove	Godavari–Krishna mangroves	India
Indomalayan	Mangrove	Indochina mangroves	Cambodia; Thailand; Viet Nam
Indomalayan	Mangrove	Indus River Delta–Arabian Sea mangroves	India; Pakistan
Indomalayan	Mangrove	Myanmar Coast mangroves	Malaysia; Myanmar; Thailand; Bangladesh
Indomalayan	Mangrove	Sunda Shelf mangroves	Indonesia; Malaysia
Indomalayan	Mangrove	Sundarbans mangroves	Bangladesh; India
Nearctic	Tropical and subtropical dry broadleaf forests	Sonoran–Sinaloan transition subtropical dry forest	Mexico
Nearctic	Tropical and subtropical coniferous forests	Bermuda subtropical conifer forests	Bermuda
Nearctic	Temperate broadleaf and mixed forests	Allegheny Highlands forests	United States
Nearctic	Temperate broadleaf and mixed forests	Appalachian mixed mesophytic forests	United States
Nearctic	Temperate broadleaf and mixed forests	Appalachian-Blue Ridge forests	United States
Nearctic	Temperate broadleaf and mixed forests	Central U.S. hardwood forests	United States
Nearctic	Temperate broadleaf and mixed forests	East Central Texas forests	United States
Nearctic	Temperate broadleaf and mixed forests	Eastern Great Lakes lowland forests	Canada; United States
Nearctic	Temperate broadleaf and mixed forests	Eastern forest-boreal transition	Canada; United States
Nearctic	Temperate broadleaf and mixed forests	Gulf of St. Lawrence lowland forests	Canada
Nearctic	Temperate broadleaf and mixed forests	Mississippi lowland forests	United States
Nearctic	Temperate broadleaf and mixed forests	New England-Acadian forests	Canada; United States
Nearctic	Temperate broadleaf and mixed forests	Northeastern coastal forests	United States
Nearctic	Temperate broadleaf and mixed forests	Ozark Mountain forests	United States
Nearctic	Temperate broadleaf and mixed forests	Sierra Madre Occidental pine–oak forests	Mexico; United States
Nearctic	Temperate broadleaf and mixed forests	Sierra Madre Oriental pine–oak forests	Mexico; United States
Nearctic	Temperate broadleaf and mixed forests	Southeastern mixed forests	United States
Nearctic	Temperate broadleaf and mixed forests	Southern Great Lakes forests	Canada; United States
Nearctic	Temperate broadleaf and mixed forests	Upper Midwest forest-savanna transition	United States
Nearctic	Temperate broadleaf and mixed forests	Western Great Lakes forests	Canada; United States
Nearctic	Temperate broadleaf and mixed forests	Willamette Valley forests	United States
Nearctic	Temperate coniferous forests	Alberta Mountain forests	Canada
Nearctic	Temperate coniferous forests	Alberta-British Columbia foothills forests	Canada
Nearctic	Temperate coniferous forests	Arizona Mountains forests	United States
Nearctic	Temperate coniferous forests	Atlantic coastal pine barrens	United States
Nearctic	Temperate coniferous forests	Blue Mountains forests	United States
Nearctic	Temperate coniferous forests	British Columbia mainland coastal forests	Canada; United States
Nearctic	Temperate coniferous forests	Cascade Mountains leeward forests	Canada; United States
Nearctic	Temperate coniferous forests	Central British Columbia Mountain forests	Canada
Nearctic	Temperate coniferous forests	Central Pacific coastal forests	Canada; United States
Nearctic	Temperate coniferous forests	Central and Southern Cascades forests	United States
Nearctic	Temperate coniferous forests	Colorado Rockies forests	United States
Nearctic	Temperate coniferous forests	Eastern Cascades forests	United States
Nearctic	Temperate coniferous forests	Florida sand pine scrub	United States
Nearctic	Temperate coniferous forests	Fraser Plateau and Basin complex	Canada
Nearctic	Temperate coniferous forests	Great Basin montane forests	United States
Nearctic	Temperate coniferous forests	Klamath-Siskiyou forests	United States
Nearctic	Temperate coniferous forests	Middle Atlantic coastal forests	United States
Nearctic	Temperate coniferous forests	North Central Rockies forests	Canada; United States
Nearctic	Temperate coniferous forests	Northern California coastal forests	United States
Nearctic	Temperate coniferous forests	Northern Pacific coastal forests	United States
Nearctic	Temperate coniferous forests	Northern transitional alpine forests	Canada
Nearctic	Temperate coniferous forests	Okanagan dry forests	Canada; United States
Nearctic	Temperate coniferous forests	Piney Woods forests	United States
Nearctic	Temperate coniferous forests	Puget lowland forests	Canada; United States
Nearctic	Temperate coniferous forests	Queen Charlotte Islands	Canada
Nearctic	Temperate coniferous forests	Sierra Juárez and San Pedro Mártir pine–oak forests	Mexico
Nearctic	Temperate coniferous forests	Sierra Nevada forests	United States
Nearctic	Temperate coniferous forests	South Central Rockies forests	United States
Nearctic	Temperate coniferous forests	Southeastern conifer forests	United States
Nearctic	Temperate coniferous forests	Wasatch and Uinta montane forests	United States
Nearctic	Boreal forests/taiga	Alaska Peninsula montane taiga	United States
Nearctic	Boreal forests/taiga	Central Canadian Shield forests	Canada
Nearctic	Boreal forests/taiga	Cook Inlet taiga	United States
Nearctic	Boreal forests/taiga	Copper Plateau taiga	United States
Nearctic	Boreal forests/taiga	Eastern Canadian Shield taiga	Canada
Nearctic	Boreal forests/taiga	Eastern Canadian forests	Canada; Saint Pierre and Miquelon
Nearctic	Boreal forests/taiga	Interior Alaska-Yukon lowland taiga	Canada
Nearctic	Boreal forests/taiga	Interior Alaska–Yukon lowland taiga	United States
Nearctic	Boreal forests/taiga	Mid-Continental Canadian forests	Canada
Nearctic	Boreal forests/taiga	Midwestern Canadian Shield forests	Canada
Nearctic	Boreal forests/taiga	Muskwa–Slave Lake forests	Canada
Nearctic	Boreal forests/taiga	Newfoundland Highland forests	Canada
Nearctic	Boreal forests/taiga	Northern Canadian Shield taiga	Canada
Nearctic	Boreal forests/taiga	Northern Cordillera forests	Canada
Nearctic	Boreal forests/taiga	Northwest Territories taiga	Canada
Nearctic	Boreal forests/taiga	South Avalon–Burin oceanic barrens	Canada
Nearctic	Boreal forests/taiga	Southern Hudson Bay taiga	Canada
Nearctic	Boreal forests/taiga	Yukon Interior dry forests	Canada
Nearctic	Tropical and subtropical grasslands, savannas, and shrublands	Western Gulf coastal grasslands	Mexico; United States
Nearctic	Temperate grasslands, savannas, and shrublands	California Central Valley grasslands	United States
Nearctic	Temperate grasslands, savannas, and shrublands	Canadian Aspen forests and parklands	Canada; United States
Nearctic	Temperate grasslands, savannas, and shrublands	Central and Southern mixed grasslands	United States
Nearctic	Temperate grasslands, savannas, and shrublands	Central forest–grasslands transition	United States
Nearctic	Temperate grasslands, savannas, and shrublands	Central tall grasslands	United States
Nearctic	Temperate grasslands, savannas, and shrublands	Edwards Plateau savanna	United States
Nearctic	Temperate grasslands, savannas, and shrublands	Flint Hills tall grasslands	United States
Nearctic	Temperate grasslands, savannas, and shrublands	Montana valley and foothill grasslands	Canada; United States
Nearctic	Temperate grasslands, savannas, and shrublands	Nebraska Sand Hills mixed grasslands	United States
Nearctic	Temperate grasslands, savannas, and shrublands	Northern mixed grasslands	Canada; United States
Nearctic	Temperate grasslands, savannas, and shrublands	Northern short grasslands	Canada; United States
Nearctic	Temperate grasslands, savannas, and shrublands	Northern tall grasslands	Canada; United States
Nearctic	Temperate grasslands, savannas, and shrublands	Palouse grasslands	United States
Nearctic	Temperate grasslands, savannas, and shrublands	Texas blackland prairies	United States
Nearctic	Temperate grasslands, savannas, and shrublands	Western short grasslands	United States
Nearctic	Tundra	Alaska–St. Elias Range tundra	Canada; United States
Nearctic	Tundra	Aleutian Islands tundra	United States
Nearctic	Tundra	Arctic coastal tundra	Canada; United States
Nearctic	Tundra	Arctic foothills tundra	Canada; United States
Nearctic	Tundra	Baffin coastal tundra	Canada
Nearctic	Tundra	Beringia lowland tundra	United States
Nearctic	Tundra	Beringia upland tundra	United States
Nearctic	Tundra	Brooks–British Range tundra	Canada; United States
Nearctic	Tundra	Davis Highlands tundra	Canada
Nearctic	Tundra	High Arctic tundra	Canada
Nearctic	Tundra	Interior Yukon–Alaska alpine tundra	Canada; United States
Nearctic	Tundra	Kalaallit Nunaat high arctic tundra	Greenland
Nearctic	Tundra	Kalaallit Nunaat low arctic tundra	Greenland
Nearctic	Tundra	Low Arctic tundra	Canada
Nearctic	Tundra	Middle Arctic tundra	Canada
Nearctic	Tundra	Ogilvie–MacKenzie alpine tundra	Canada; United States
Nearctic	Tundra	Pacific Coastal Mountain icefields and tundra	Canada; United States
Nearctic	Tundra	Torngat Mountain tundra	Canada
Nearctic	Mediterranean forests, woodlands, and scrub	California coastal sage and chaparral	Mexico; United States
Nearctic	Mediterranean forests, woodlands, and scrub	California interior chaparral and woodlands	United States
Nearctic	Mediterranean forests, woodlands, and scrub	California montane chaparral and woodlands	United States
Nearctic	Deserts and xeric shrublands	Baja California desert	Mexico
Nearctic	Deserts and xeric shrublands	Central Mexican matorral	Mexico
Nearctic	Deserts and xeric shrublands	Chihuahuan desert	Mexico; United States
Nearctic	Deserts and xeric shrublands	Colorado Plateau shrublands	United States
Nearctic	Deserts and xeric shrublands	Great Basin shrub steppe	United States
Nearctic	Deserts and xeric shrublands	Gulf of California xeric scrub	Mexico
Nearctic	Deserts and xeric shrublands	Meseta Central matorral	Mexico
Nearctic	Deserts and xeric shrublands	Mojave desert	United States
Nearctic	Deserts and xeric shrublands	Snake–Columbia shrub steppe	United States
Nearctic	Deserts and xeric shrublands	Sonoran desert	Mexico; United States
Nearctic	Deserts and xeric shrublands	Tamaulipan matorral	Mexico
Nearctic	Deserts and xeric shrublands	Tamaulipan mezquital	Mexico; United States
Nearctic	Deserts and xeric shrublands	Wyoming Basin shrub steppe	United States
Nearctic	Mangrove	Northwest Mexican Coast mangroves	Mexico
Neotropical	Tropical and subtropical moist broadleaf forests	Alto Paraná Atlantic forests	Argentina; Brazil; Paraguay
Neotropical	Tropical and subtropical moist broadleaf forests	Araucaria moist forests	Argentina; Brazil
Neotropical	Tropical and subtropical moist broadleaf forests	Atlantic Coast restingas	Brazil
Neotropical	Tropical and subtropical moist broadleaf forests	Bahia coastal forests	Brazil
Neotropical	Tropical and subtropical moist broadleaf forests	Bahia interior forests	Brazil
Neotropical	Tropical and subtropical moist broadleaf forests	Bolivian Yungas	Bolivia; Peru
Neotropical	Tropical and subtropical moist broadleaf forests	Caatinga Enclaves moist forests	Brazil
Neotropical	Tropical and subtropical moist broadleaf forests	Caquetá moist forests	Brazil; Colombia
Neotropical	Tropical and subtropical moist broadleaf forests	Catatumbo moist forests	Colombia; Venezuela
Neotropical	Tropical and subtropical moist broadleaf forests	Cauca Valley montane forests	Colombia
Neotropical	Tropical and subtropical moist broadleaf forests	Cayos Miskitos–San Andrés and Providencia moist forests	Nicaragua
Neotropical	Tropical and subtropical moist broadleaf forests	Central American Atlantic moist forests	Guatemala; Honduras; Nicaragua
Neotropical	Tropical and subtropical moist broadleaf forests	Central American montane forests	El Salvador; Guatemala; Honduras; Nicaragua
Neotropical	Tropical and subtropical moist broadleaf forests	Chiapas montane forests	Guatemala; Mexico
Neotropical	Tropical and subtropical moist broadleaf forests	Chimalapas montane forests	Mexico
Neotropical	Tropical and subtropical moist broadleaf forests	Chocó–Darién moist forests	Colombia; Panama
Neotropical	Tropical and subtropical moist broadleaf forests	Cocos Island moist forests	Costa Rica
Neotropical	Tropical and subtropical moist broadleaf forests	Cordillera La Costa montane forests	Venezuela
Neotropical	Tropical and subtropical moist broadleaf forests	Cordillera Oriental montane forests	Colombia; Venezuela
Neotropical	Tropical and subtropical moist broadleaf forests	Costa Rican seasonal moist forests	Costa Rica; Nicaragua
Neotropical	Tropical and subtropical moist broadleaf forests	Cuban moist forests	Cuba
Neotropical	Tropical and subtropical moist broadleaf forests	Eastern Cordillera Real montane forests	Colombia; Ecuador; Peru
Neotropical	Tropical and subtropical moist broadleaf forests	Eastern Panamanian montane forests	Colombia; Panama
Neotropical	Tropical and subtropical moist broadleaf forests	Fernando de Noronha-Atol das Rocas moist forests	Brazil
Neotropical	Tropical and subtropical moist broadleaf forests	Guayanan Highlands moist forests	Brazil; French Guiana; Guyana; Suriname; Venezuela
Neotropical	Tropical and subtropical moist broadleaf forests	Guianan moist forests	Brazil; French Guiana; Guyana; Suriname; Venezuela
Neotropical	Tropical and subtropical moist broadleaf forests	Guianan piedmont and lowland moist forests	Brazil; Venezuela
Neotropical	Tropical and subtropical moist broadleaf forests	Gurupa várzea	Brazil
Neotropical	Tropical and subtropical moist broadleaf forests	Hispaniolan moist forests	Dominican Republic; Haiti
Neotropical	Tropical and subtropical moist broadleaf forests	Iquitos várzea	Brazil; Peru
Neotropical	Tropical and subtropical moist broadleaf forests	Isthmian–Atlantic moist forests	Costa Rica; Nicaragua; Panama
Neotropical	Tropical and subtropical moist broadleaf forests	Isthmian–Pacific moist forests	Costa Rica; Panama
Neotropical	Tropical and subtropical moist broadleaf forests	Jamaican moist forests	Jamaica
Neotropical	Tropical and subtropical moist broadleaf forests	Japurá–Solimões–Negro moist forests	Brazil; Colombia
Neotropical	Tropical and subtropical moist broadleaf forests	Juruá–Purus moist forests	Brazil
Neotropical	Tropical and subtropical moist broadleaf forests	Leeward Islands moist forests	Antigua and Barbuda; Guadeloupe; Montserrat; Saint Kitts and Nevis; Virgin Islands, British; Virgin Islands, U.S.
Neotropical	Tropical and subtropical moist broadleaf forests	Madeira–Tapajós moist forests	Bolivia; Brazil
Neotropical	Tropical and subtropical moist broadleaf forests	Magdalena Valley montane forests	Colombia
Neotropical	Tropical and subtropical moist broadleaf forests	Magdalena–Urabá moist forests	Colombia
Neotropical	Tropical and subtropical moist broadleaf forests	Marajó várzea	Brazil
Neotropical	Tropical and subtropical moist broadleaf forests	Maranhão Babaçu forests	Brazil
Neotropical	Tropical and subtropical moist broadleaf forests	Mato Grosso tropical dry forests	Brazil
Neotropical	Tropical and subtropical moist broadleaf forests	Monte Alegre várzea	Brazil
Neotropical	Tropical and subtropical moist broadleaf forests	Napo moist forests	Colombia; Ecuador; Peru
Neotropical	Tropical and subtropical moist broadleaf forests	Negro–Branco moist forests	Brazil; Colombia; Venezuela
Neotropical	Tropical and subtropical moist broadleaf forests	Northeastern Brazil restingas	Brazil
Neotropical	Tropical and subtropical moist broadleaf forests	Northwestern Andean montane forests	Colombia; Ecuador
Neotropical	Tropical and subtropical moist broadleaf forests	Oaxacan montane forests	Mexico
Neotropical	Tropical and subtropical moist broadleaf forests	Orinoco Delta swamp forests	Guyana; Venezuela
Neotropical	Tropical and subtropical moist broadleaf forests	Pantanos de Centla	Mexico
Neotropical	Tropical and subtropical moist broadleaf forests	Paramaribo swamp forests	Suriname
Neotropical	Tropical and subtropical moist broadleaf forests	Pernambuco coastal forests	Brazil
Neotropical	Tropical and subtropical moist broadleaf forests	Pernambuco interior forests	Brazil
Neotropical	Tropical and subtropical moist broadleaf forests	Peruvian Yungas	Peru
Neotropical	Tropical and subtropical moist broadleaf forests	Petén–Veracruz moist forests	Belize; Guatemala; Mexico
Neotropical	Tropical and subtropical moist broadleaf forests	Puerto Rican moist forests	Puerto Rico
Neotropical	Tropical and subtropical moist broadleaf forests	Purus várzea	Brazil; Colombia; Peru
Neotropical	Tropical and subtropical moist broadleaf forests	Purus–Madeira moist forests	Brazil
Neotropical	Tropical and subtropical moist broadleaf forests	Rio Negro campinarana	Brazil; Colombia; Venezuela
Neotropical	Tropical and subtropical moist broadleaf forests	Santa Marta montane forests	Colombia
Neotropical	Tropical and subtropical moist broadleaf forests	Serra do Mar coastal forests	Brazil
Neotropical	Tropical and subtropical moist broadleaf forests	Sierra Madre de Chiapas moist forests	El Salvador; Guatemala; Mexico
Neotropical	Tropical and subtropical moist broadleaf forests	Sierra de los Tuxtlas	Mexico
Neotropical	Tropical and subtropical moist broadleaf forests	Solimões–Japurá moist forests	Brazil; Colombia; Peru
Neotropical	Tropical and subtropical moist broadleaf forests	South Florida rocklands	United States
Neotropical	Tropical and subtropical moist broadleaf forests	Southern Andean Yungas	Argentina; Bolivia
Neotropical	Tropical and subtropical moist broadleaf forests	Southwest Amazon moist forests	Bolivia; Brazil; Peru
Neotropical	Tropical and subtropical moist broadleaf forests	Talamancan montane forests	Costa Rica; Panama
Neotropical	Tropical and subtropical moist broadleaf forests	Tapajós–Xingu moist forests	Brazil
Neotropical	Tropical and subtropical moist broadleaf forests	Tepuis	Brazil; Guyana; Suriname; Venezuela
Neotropical	Tropical and subtropical moist broadleaf forests	Tocantins–Araguaia–Maranhão moist forests	Brazil
Neotropical	Tropical and subtropical moist broadleaf forests	Trindade-Martin Vaz Islands tropical forests	Brazil
Neotropical	Tropical and subtropical moist broadleaf forests	Trinidad and Tobago moist forests	Trinidad and Tobago
Neotropical	Tropical and subtropical moist broadleaf forests	Uatuma–Trombetas moist forests	Brazil
Neotropical	Tropical and subtropical moist broadleaf forests	Ucayali moist forests	Peru
Neotropical	Tropical and subtropical moist broadleaf forests	Venezuelan Andes montane forests	Venezuela
Neotropical	Tropical and subtropical moist broadleaf forests	Veracruz moist forests	Mexico
Neotropical	Tropical and subtropical moist broadleaf forests	Veracruz montane forests	Mexico
Neotropical	Tropical and subtropical moist broadleaf forests	Western Ecuador moist forests	Colombia; Ecuador
Neotropical	Tropical and subtropical moist broadleaf forests	Windward Islands moist forests	Dominica; Grenada; Martinique; Saint Lucia; Saint Vincent and the Grenadines
Neotropical	Tropical and subtropical moist broadleaf forests	Xingu–Tocantins–Araguaia moist forests	Brazil
Neotropical	Tropical and subtropical moist broadleaf forests	Yucatán moist forests	Guatemala; Mexico
Neotropical	Tropical and subtropical dry broadleaf forests	Apure–Villavicencio dry forests	Colombia; Venezuela
Neotropical	Tropical and subtropical dry broadleaf forests	Atlantic dry forests	Brazil
Neotropical	Tropical and subtropical dry broadleaf forests	Bahamian dry forests	Bahamas; Turks and Caicos Islands
Neotropical	Tropical and subtropical dry broadleaf forests	Bajío dry forests	Mexico
Neotropical	Tropical and subtropical dry broadleaf forests	Balsas dry forests	Mexico
Neotropical	Tropical and subtropical dry broadleaf forests	Bolivian montane dry forests	Bolivia
Neotropical	Tropical and subtropical dry broadleaf forests	Cauca Valley dry forests	Colombia
Neotropical	Tropical and subtropical dry broadleaf forests	Cayman Islands dry forests	Cayman Islands
Neotropical	Tropical and subtropical dry broadleaf forests	Central American dry forests	Costa Rica; El Salvador; Guatemala; Honduras; Mexico; Nicaragua
Neotropical	Tropical and subtropical dry broadleaf forests	Chaco	Argentina; Bolivia; Paraguay
Neotropical	Tropical and subtropical dry broadleaf forests	Chiapas Depression dry forests	Guatemala; Mexico
Neotropical	Tropical and subtropical dry broadleaf forests	Chiquitano dry forests	Bolivia; Brazil
Neotropical	Tropical and subtropical dry broadleaf forests	Cuban dry forests	Cuba
Neotropical	Tropical and subtropical dry broadleaf forests	Ecuadorian dry forests	Ecuador
Neotropical	Tropical and subtropical dry broadleaf forests	Hispaniolan dry forests	Dominican Republic; Haiti
Neotropical	Tropical and subtropical dry broadleaf forests	Islas Revillagigedo dry forests	Mexico
Neotropical	Tropical and subtropical dry broadleaf forests	Jalisco dry forests	Mexico
Neotropical	Tropical and subtropical dry broadleaf forests	Jamaican dry forests	Jamaica
Neotropical	Tropical and subtropical dry broadleaf forests	Lara–Falcón dry forests	Venezuela
Neotropical	Tropical and subtropical dry broadleaf forests	Lesser Antillean dry forests	Anguilla; Antigua and Barbuda; Grenada; Martinique; Montserrat; Saint Kitts and Nevis; Saint Lucia; Saint Vincent and the Grenadines; Trinidad and Tobago
Neotropical	Tropical and subtropical dry broadleaf forests	Magdalena Valley dry forests	Colombia
Neotropical	Tropical and subtropical dry broadleaf forests	Maracaibo dry forests	Venezuela
Neotropical	Tropical and subtropical dry broadleaf forests	Marañón dry forests	Peru
Neotropical	Tropical and subtropical dry broadleaf forests	Panamanian dry forests	Panama
Neotropical	Tropical and subtropical dry broadleaf forests	Patía Valley dry forests	Colombia
Neotropical	Tropical and subtropical dry broadleaf forests	Puerto Rican dry forests	Puerto Rico
Neotropical	Tropical and subtropical dry broadleaf forests	Sierra de la Laguna dry forests	Mexico
Neotropical	Tropical and subtropical dry broadleaf forests	Sinaloan dry forests	Mexico
Neotropical	Tropical and subtropical dry broadleaf forests	Sinú Valley dry forests	Colombia
Neotropical	Tropical and subtropical dry broadleaf forests	Southern Pacific dry forests	Mexico
Neotropical	Tropical and subtropical dry broadleaf forests	Trinidad and Tobago dry forests	Trinidad and Tobago
Neotropical	Tropical and subtropical dry broadleaf forests	Tumbes–Piura dry forests	Ecuador; Peru
Neotropical	Tropical and subtropical dry broadleaf forests	Veracruz dry forests	Mexico
Neotropical	Tropical and subtropical dry broadleaf forests	Yucatán dry forests	Mexico
Neotropical	Tropical and subtropical coniferous forests	Bahamian pine mosaic	Bahamas; Turks and Caicos Islands
Neotropical	Tropical and subtropical coniferous forests	Belizian pine forests	Belize
Neotropical	Tropical and subtropical coniferous forests	Central American pine–oak forests	El Salvador; Guatemala; Honduras; Mexico; Nicaragua
Neotropical	Tropical and subtropical coniferous forests	Cuban pine forests	Cuba
Neotropical	Tropical and subtropical coniferous forests	Hispaniolan pine forests	Dominican Republic; Haiti
Neotropical	Tropical and subtropical coniferous forests	Miskito pine forests	Honduras; Nicaragua
Neotropical	Tropical and subtropical coniferous forests	Sierra Madre de Oaxaca pine–oak forests	Mexico
Neotropical	Tropical and subtropical coniferous forests	Sierra Madre del Sur pine–oak forests	Mexico
Neotropical	Tropical and subtropical coniferous forests	Sierra de la Laguna pine–oak forests	Mexico
Neotropical	Tropical and subtropical coniferous forests	Trans-Mexican Volcanic Belt pine–oak forests	Mexico
Neotropical	Temperate broadleaf and mixed forests	Juan Fernández Islands temperate forests	Chile
Neotropical	Temperate broadleaf and mixed forests	Magellanic subpolar forests	Argentina; Chile
Neotropical	Temperate broadleaf and mixed forests	San Félix–San Ambrosio Islands temperate forests	Chile
Neotropical	Temperate broadleaf and mixed forests	Valdivian temperate forests	Argentina; Chile
Neotropical	Tropical and subtropical grasslands, savannas, and shrublands	Arid Chaco	Argentina
Neotropical	Tropical and subtropical grasslands, savannas, and shrublands	Beni savanna	Bolivia
Neotropical	Tropical and subtropical grasslands, savannas, and shrublands	Campos rupestres montane savanna	Brazil
Neotropical	Tropical and subtropical grasslands, savannas, and shrublands	Cerrado	Bolivia; Brazil; Paraguay
Neotropical	Tropical and subtropical grasslands, savannas, and shrublands	Clipperton Island shrub and grasslands	Clipperton Island
Neotropical	Tropical and subtropical grasslands, savannas, and shrublands	Córdoba montane savanna	Argentina
Neotropical	Tropical and subtropical grasslands, savannas, and shrublands	Guianan savanna	Brazil; Guyana; Suriname; Venezuela
Neotropical	Tropical and subtropical grasslands, savannas, and shrublands	Humid Chaco	Argentina; Brazil; Paraguay
Neotropical	Tropical and subtropical grasslands, savannas, and shrublands	Llanos	Colombia; Venezuela
Neotropical	Tropical and subtropical grasslands, savannas, and shrublands	Uruguayan savanna	Brazil; Uruguay
Neotropical	Temperate grasslands, savannas, and shrublands	Argentine Espinal	Argentina
Neotropical	Temperate grasslands, savannas, and shrublands	Argentine Monte	Argentina
Neotropical	Temperate grasslands, savannas, and shrublands	Humid Pampas	Argentina
Neotropical	Temperate grasslands, savannas, and shrublands	Patagonian grasslands	Argentina; Chile
Neotropical	Temperate grasslands, savannas, and shrublands	Patagonian steppe	Argentina; Chile; Falkland Islands
Neotropical	Temperate grasslands, savannas, and shrublands	Semi-arid Pampas	Argentina
Neotropical	Flooded grasslands and savannas	Central Mexican wetlands	Mexico
Neotropical	Flooded grasslands and savannas	Cuban wetlands	Cuba
Neotropical	Flooded grasslands and savannas	Enriquillo wetlands	Dominican Republic
Neotropical	Flooded grasslands and savannas	Everglades	United States
Neotropical	Flooded grasslands and savannas	Guayaquil flooded grasslands	Ecuador
Neotropical	Flooded grasslands and savannas	Orinoco wetlands	Venezuela
Neotropical	Flooded grasslands and savannas	Pantanal	Bolivia; Brazil; Paraguay
Neotropical	Flooded grasslands and savannas	Paraná flooded savanna	Argentina; Paraguay
Neotropical	Flooded grasslands and savannas	Southern Cone Mesopotamian savanna	Argentina
Neotropical	Montane grasslands and shrublands	Central Andean dry puna	Argentina; Bolivia; Chile
Neotropical	Montane grasslands and shrublands	Central Andean puna	Argentina; Bolivia; Peru; Chile
Neotropical	Montane grasslands and shrublands	Central Andean wet puna	Bolivia; Peru
Neotropical	Montane grasslands and shrublands	Cordillera Central páramo	Ecuador; Peru
Neotropical	Montane grasslands and shrublands	Cordillera de Merida páramo	Venezuela
Neotropical	Montane grasslands and shrublands	High Monte	Argentina
Neotropical	Montane grasslands and shrublands	Northern Andean páramo	Colombia; Ecuador
Neotropical	Montane grasslands and shrublands	Santa Marta páramo	Colombia
Neotropical	Montane grasslands and shrublands	Southern Andean steppe	Argentina; Chile
Neotropical	Montane grasslands and shrublands	Zacatonal	Mexico
Neotropical	Mediterranean forests, woodlands, and scrub	Chilean matorral	Chile
Neotropical	Deserts and xeric shrublands	Araya and Paria xeric scrub	Venezuela
Neotropical	Deserts and xeric shrublands	Aruba–Curaçao–Bonaire cactus scrub	Aruba
Neotropical	Deserts and xeric shrublands	Atacama Desert	Chile
Neotropical	Deserts and xeric shrublands	Caatinga	Brazil
Neotropical	Deserts and xeric shrublands	Cayman Islands xeric scrub	Cayman Islands
Neotropical	Deserts and xeric shrublands	Cuban cactus scrub	Cuba
Neotropical	Deserts and xeric shrublands	Galápagos Islands xeric scrub	Ecuador
Neotropical	Deserts and xeric shrublands	Guajira–Barranquilla xeric scrub	Colombia; Venezuela
Neotropical	Deserts and xeric shrublands	La Costa xeric shrublands	Venezuela
Neotropical	Deserts and xeric shrublands	Leeward Islands xeric scrub	Anguilla; Antigua and Barbuda; Guadeloupe; Saint Barthélemy; Saint Martin (French part); Virgin Islands, British; Virgin Islands, U.S.
Neotropical	Deserts and xeric shrublands	Malpelo Island xeric scrub	Colombia
Neotropical	Deserts and xeric shrublands	Motagua Valley thornscrub	Guatemala
Neotropical	Deserts and xeric shrublands	Paraguana xeric scrub	Venezuela
Neotropical	Deserts and xeric shrublands	San Lucan xeric scrub	Mexico
Neotropical	Deserts and xeric shrublands	Sechura desert	Chile; Peru
Neotropical	Deserts and xeric shrublands	St. Peter and St. Paul Rocks	Brazil
Neotropical	Deserts and xeric shrublands	Tehuacán Valley matorral	Mexico
Neotropical	Deserts and xeric shrublands	Windward Islands xeric scrub	Barbados; Dominica; Grenada; Martinique; Saint Lucia; Trinidad and Tobago
Neotropical	Mangrove	Alvarado mangroves	Mexico
Neotropical	Mangrove	Amapa mangroves	Brazil
Neotropical	Mangrove	Bahamian mangroves	Bahamas; Turks and Caicos Islands
Neotropical	Mangrove	Bahia mangroves	Brazil
Neotropical	Mangrove	Belizean Coast mangroves	Belize; Guatemala
Neotropical	Mangrove	Belizean Reef mangroves	Belize
Neotropical	Mangrove	Bocas del Toro–San Bastimentos Island–San Blas mangroves	Costa Rica; Panama
Neotropical	Mangrove	Coastal Venezuelan mangroves	Aruba; Venezuela
Neotropical	Mangrove	Esmeraldas–Pacific Colombia mangroves	Colombia; Ecuador
Neotropical	Mangrove	Greater Antilles mangroves	Cuba; Dominican Republic; Haiti; Jamaica; Puerto Rico
Neotropical	Mangrove	Guianan mangroves	French Guiana; Guyana; Suriname; Venezuela
Neotropical	Mangrove	Gulf of Fonseca mangroves	El Salvador; Honduras; Nicaragua
Neotropical	Mangrove	Gulf of Guayaquil–Tumbes mangroves	Ecuador; Peru
Neotropical	Mangrove	Gulf of Panama mangroves	Panama
Neotropical	Mangrove	Ilha Grande mangroves	Brazil
Neotropical	Mangrove	Lesser Antilles mangroves	Antigua and Barbuda; Guadeloupe; Martinique; Nicaragua; Saint Lucia
Neotropical	Mangrove	Magdalena–Santa Marta mangroves	Colombia
Neotropical	Mangrove	Manabí mangroves	Ecuador
Neotropical	Mangrove	Maranhao mangroves	Brazil
Neotropical	Mangrove	Marismas Nacionales–San Blas mangroves	Mexico
Neotropical	Mangrove	Mayan Corridor mangroves	Mexico
Neotropical	Mangrove	Mexican South Pacific Coast mangroves	Mexico
Neotropical	Mangrove	Moist Pacific Coast mangroves	Costa Rica; Panama
Neotropical	Mangrove	Mosquitia–Nicaraguan Caribbean Coast mangroves	Honduras; Nicaragua
Neotropical	Mangrove	Northern Dry Pacific Coast mangroves	El Salvador; Nicaragua
Neotropical	Mangrove	Northern Honduras mangroves	Guatemala; Honduras
Neotropical	Mangrove	Pará mangroves	Brazil
Neotropical	Mangrove	Petenes mangroves	Mexico
Neotropical	Mangrove	Piura mangroves	Peru
Neotropical	Mangrove	Rio Negro–Rio San Sun mangroves	Costa Rica; Nicaragua
Neotropical	Mangrove	Rio Piranhas mangroves	Brazil
Neotropical	Mangrove	Rio São Francisco mangroves	Brazil
Neotropical	Mangrove	Ría Lagartos mangroves	Mexico
Neotropical	Mangrove	Southern Dry Pacific Coast mangroves	Costa Rica; Nicaragua
Neotropical	Mangrove	Tehuantepec–El Manchón mangroves	Mexico
Neotropical	Mangrove	Trinidad mangroves	Trinidad and Tobago
Neotropical	Mangrove	Usumacinta mangroves	Mexico
Oceania	Tropical and subtropical moist broadleaf forests	Carolines tropical moist forests	Micronesia, Federated States of
Oceania	Tropical and subtropical moist broadleaf forests	Central Polynesian tropical moist forests	Cook Islands; Kiribati; United States
Oceania	Tropical and subtropical moist broadleaf forests	Cook Islands tropical moist forests	Cook Islands
Oceania	Tropical and subtropical moist broadleaf forests	Eastern Micronesia tropical moist forests	Kiribati; Marshall Islands; Nauru; United States
Oceania	Tropical and subtropical moist broadleaf forests	Fiji tropical moist forests	Fiji; Wallis and Futuna
Oceania	Tropical and subtropical moist broadleaf forests	Hawaii tropical moist forests	United States
Oceania	Tropical and subtropical moist broadleaf forests	Kermadec Islands subtropical moist forests	New Zealand
Oceania	Tropical and subtropical moist broadleaf forests	Marquesas tropical moist forests	French Polynesia
Oceania	Tropical and subtropical moist broadleaf forests	Ogasawara subtropical moist forests	Japan
Oceania	Tropical and subtropical moist broadleaf forests	Palau tropical moist forests	Palau
Oceania	Tropical and subtropical moist broadleaf forests	Rapa Nui and Sala-y-Gomez subtropical broadleaf forests	Chile
Oceania	Tropical and subtropical moist broadleaf forests	Samoan tropical moist forests	American Samoa; Samoa
Oceania	Tropical and subtropical moist broadleaf forests	Society Islands tropical moist forests	French Polynesia
Oceania	Tropical and subtropical moist broadleaf forests	Tongan tropical moist forests	Niue; Tonga
Oceania	Tropical and subtropical moist broadleaf forests	Tuamotu tropical moist forests	French Polynesia; Pitcairn Islands
Oceania	Tropical and subtropical moist broadleaf forests	Tubuai tropical moist forests	French Polynesia
Oceania	Tropical and subtropical moist broadleaf forests	Western Polynesian tropical moist forests	American Samoa; Kiribati; Tokelau; Tuvalu; United States
Oceania	Tropical and subtropical dry broadleaf forests	Fiji tropical dry forests	Fiji
Oceania	Tropical and subtropical dry broadleaf forests	Hawaii tropical dry forests	United States
Oceania	Tropical and subtropical dry broadleaf forests	Marianas tropical dry forests	Guam; Northern Mariana Islands
Oceania	Tropical and subtropical dry broadleaf forests	Yap tropical dry forests	Micronesia, Federated States of
Oceania	Tropical and subtropical grasslands, savannas, and shrublands	Hawaii tropical high shrublands	United States
Oceania	Tropical and subtropical grasslands, savannas, and shrublands	Hawaii tropical low shrublands	United States
Oceania	Tropical and subtropical grasslands, savannas, and shrublands	Northwestern Hawaii scrub	United States
Palearctic	Tropical and subtropical moist broadleaf forests	Guizhou Plateau broadleaf and mixed forests	China
Palearctic	Tropical and subtropical moist broadleaf forests	Yunnan Plateau subtropical evergreen forests	China
Palearctic	Temperate broadleaf and mixed forests	Apennine deciduous montane forests	Italy
Palearctic	Temperate broadleaf and mixed forests	Atlantic mixed forests	Belgium; Denmark; France; Germany; Guernsey; Jersey; Netherlands
Palearctic	Temperate broadleaf and mixed forests	Azores temperate mixed forests	Portugal
Palearctic	Temperate broadleaf and mixed forests	Balkan mixed forests	Albania; Bosnia and Herzegovina; Bulgaria; Greece; Kosovo; North Macedonia; Montenegro; Romania; Serbia; Turkey
Palearctic	Temperate broadleaf and mixed forests	Baltic mixed forests	Denmark; Germany; Poland; Sweden
Palearctic	Temperate broadleaf and mixed forests	Cantabrian mixed forests	France; Portugal; Spain
Palearctic	Temperate broadleaf and mixed forests	Caspian Hyrcanian mixed forests	Azerbaijan; Iran
Palearctic	Temperate broadleaf and mixed forests	Caucasus mixed forests	Armenia; Azerbaijan; Georgia; Russian Federation; Turkey
Palearctic	Temperate broadleaf and mixed forests	Celtic broadleaf forests	Ireland; Isle of Man; United Kingdom
Palearctic	Temperate broadleaf and mixed forests	Central Anatolian deciduous forests	Turkey
Palearctic	Temperate broadleaf and mixed forests	Central China loess plateau mixed forests	China
Palearctic	Temperate broadleaf and mixed forests	Central European mixed forests	Austria; Belarus; Czech Republic; Germany; Lithuania; Moldova; Poland; Romania; Russian Federation; Ukraine
Palearctic	Temperate broadleaf and mixed forests	Central Korean deciduous forests	China; Korea, North; Korea, South
Palearctic	Temperate broadleaf and mixed forests	Changbai Mountains mixed forests	China; Korea, North
Palearctic	Temperate broadleaf and mixed forests	Changjiang Plain evergreen forests	China
Palearctic	Temperate broadleaf and mixed forests	Crimean Submediterranean forest complex	Russian Federation; Ukraine
Palearctic	Temperate broadleaf and mixed forests	Daba Mountains evergreen forests	China
Palearctic	Temperate broadleaf and mixed forests	Dinaric Mountains mixed forests	Albania; Bosnia and Herzegovina; Croatia; Italy; Kosovo; Montenegro; Serbia; Slovenia
Palearctic	Temperate broadleaf and mixed forests	East European forest steppe	Bulgaria; Moldova; Romania; Russian Federation; Ukraine
Palearctic	Temperate broadleaf and mixed forests	Eastern Anatolian deciduous forests	Turkey
Palearctic	Temperate broadleaf and mixed forests	English Lowlands beech forests	United Kingdom
Palearctic	Temperate broadleaf and mixed forests	Euxine–Colchic deciduous forests	Bulgaria; Georgia; Turkey
Palearctic	Temperate broadleaf and mixed forests	Hokkaido deciduous forests	Japan
Palearctic	Temperate broadleaf and mixed forests	Huang He Plain mixed forests	China
Palearctic	Temperate broadleaf and mixed forests	Madeira evergreen forests	Portugal
Palearctic	Temperate broadleaf and mixed forests	Manchurian mixed forests	China; Korea, North; Korea, South; Russian Federation
Palearctic	Temperate broadleaf and mixed forests	Nihonkai evergreen forests	Japan
Palearctic	Temperate broadleaf and mixed forests	Nihonkai montane deciduous forests	Japan
Palearctic	Temperate broadleaf and mixed forests	North Atlantic moist mixed forests	Ireland; United Kingdom
Palearctic	Temperate broadleaf and mixed forests	Northeast China Plain deciduous forests	China
Palearctic	Temperate broadleaf and mixed forests	Pannonian mixed forests	Austria; Bosnia and Herzegovina; Croatia; Czech Republic; Hungary; Romania; Serbia; Slovakia; Slovenia; Ukraine
Palearctic	Temperate broadleaf and mixed forests	Po Basin mixed forests	Italy
Palearctic	Temperate broadleaf and mixed forests	Pyrenees conifer and mixed forests	Andorra; France; Spain
Palearctic	Temperate broadleaf and mixed forests	Qin Ling Mountains deciduous forests	China
Palearctic	Temperate broadleaf and mixed forests	Rodope montane mixed forests	Bulgaria; Greece; North Macedonia; Serbia
Palearctic	Temperate broadleaf and mixed forests	Sarmatic mixed forests	Belarus; Estonia; Finland; Latvia; Lithuania; Norway; Russian Federation; Sweden
Palearctic	Temperate broadleaf and mixed forests	Sichuan Basin evergreen broadleaf forests	China
Palearctic	Temperate broadleaf and mixed forests	South Sakhalin-Kurile mixed forests	Japan; Russian Federation
Palearctic	Temperate broadleaf and mixed forests	Southern Korea evergreen forests	Korea, South
Palearctic	Temperate broadleaf and mixed forests	Taiheiyo evergreen forests	Japan
Palearctic	Temperate broadleaf and mixed forests	Taiheiyo montane deciduous forests	Japan
Palearctic	Temperate broadleaf and mixed forests	Tarim Basin deciduous forests and steppe	China
Palearctic	Temperate broadleaf and mixed forests	Ussuri broadleaf and mixed forests	Russian Federation
Palearctic	Temperate broadleaf and mixed forests	West Siberian broadleaf and mixed forests	Russian Federation
Palearctic	Temperate broadleaf and mixed forests	Western European broadleaf forests	Austria; Belgium; Czech Republic; France; Germany; Liechtenstein; Luxembourg; Poland; Switzerland
Palearctic	Temperate broadleaf and mixed forests	Zagros Mountains forest steppe	Iran; Iraq; Turkey
Palearctic	Temperate coniferous forests	Alps conifer and mixed forests	Austria; France; Germany; Italy; Liechtenstein; Slovenia; Switzerland
Palearctic	Temperate coniferous forests	Altai montane forest and forest steppe	China; Kazakhstan; Mongolia; Russian Federation
Palearctic	Temperate coniferous forests	Caledon conifer forests	United Kingdom
Palearctic	Temperate coniferous forests	Carpathian montane conifer forests	Czech Republic; Poland; Romania; Slovakia; Ukraine
Palearctic	Temperate coniferous forests	Da Hinggan–Dzhagdy Mountains conifer forests	China; Russian Federation
Palearctic	Temperate coniferous forests	East Afghan montane conifer forests	Afghanistan; Pakistan
Palearctic	Temperate coniferous forests	Elburz Range forest steppe	Iran
Palearctic	Temperate coniferous forests	Helanshan montane conifer forests	China
Palearctic	Temperate coniferous forests	Hengduan Mountains subalpine conifer forests	China
Palearctic	Temperate coniferous forests	Hokkaido montane conifer forests	Japan
Palearctic	Temperate coniferous forests	Honshu alpine conifer forests	Japan
Palearctic	Temperate coniferous forests	Khangai Mountains conifer forests	Mongolia
Palearctic	Temperate coniferous forests	Mediterranean conifer and mixed forests	Algeria; Morocco; Tunisia
Palearctic	Temperate coniferous forests	Northeastern Himalayan subalpine conifer forests	Bhutan; China; India
Palearctic	Temperate coniferous forests	Northern Anatolian conifer and deciduous forests	Turkey
Palearctic	Temperate coniferous forests	Nujiang Lancang Gorge alpine conifer and mixed forests	China; Myanmar
Palearctic	Temperate coniferous forests	Qilian Mountains conifer forests	China
Palearctic	Temperate coniferous forests	Qionglai–Minshan conifer forests	China
Palearctic	Temperate coniferous forests	Sayan montane conifer forests	Mongolia; Russian Federation
Palearctic	Temperate coniferous forests	Scandinavian coastal conifer forests	Norway
Palearctic	Temperate coniferous forests	Tian Shan montane conifer forests	China; Kazakhstan; Kyrgyzstan
Palearctic	Boreal forests/taiga	East Siberian taiga	Russian Federation
Palearctic	Boreal forests/taiga	Iceland boreal birch forests and alpine tundra	Iceland
Palearctic	Boreal forests/taiga	Kamchatka–Kurile meadows and sparse forests	Russian Federation
Palearctic	Boreal forests/taiga	Kamchatka–Kurile taiga	Russian Federation
Palearctic	Boreal forests/taiga	Northeast Siberian taiga	Russian Federation
Palearctic	Boreal forests/taiga	Okhotsk–Manchurian taiga	Russian Federation
Palearctic	Boreal forests/taiga	Sakhalin Island taiga	Russian Federation
Palearctic	Boreal forests/taiga	Scandinavian and Russian taiga	Finland; Norway; Russian Federation; Sweden
Palearctic	Boreal forests/taiga	Trans-Baikal conifer forests	Mongolia; Russian Federation
Palearctic	Boreal forests/taiga	Urals montane tundra and taiga	Russian Federation
Palearctic	Boreal forests/taiga	West Siberian taiga	Russian Federation
Palearctic	Temperate grasslands, savannas, and shrublands	Alai–Western Tian Shan steppe	Kyrgyzstan; Russian Federation; Tajikistan; Turkmenistan; Uzbekistan
Palearctic	Temperate grasslands, savannas, and shrublands	Altai steppe and semi-desert	China; Kazakhstan
Palearctic	Temperate grasslands, savannas, and shrublands	Central Anatolian steppe	Turkey
Palearctic	Temperate grasslands, savannas, and shrublands	Daurian forest steppe	China; Mongolia; Russian Federation
Palearctic	Temperate grasslands, savannas, and shrublands	Eastern Anatolian montane steppe	Armenia; Azerbaijan; Georgia; Iran; Turkey
Palearctic	Temperate grasslands, savannas, and shrublands	Emin Valley steppe	China; Kazakhstan
Palearctic	Temperate grasslands, savannas, and shrublands	Faroe Islands boreal grasslands	Faroe Islands
Palearctic	Temperate grasslands, savannas, and shrublands	Gissaro–Alai open woodlands	Afghanistan; Kazakhstan; Kyrgyzstan; Tajikistan; Uzbekistan
Palearctic	Temperate grasslands, savannas, and shrublands	Kazakh forest steppe	Kazakhstan; Russian Federation
Palearctic	Temperate grasslands, savannas, and shrublands	Kazakh steppe	Kazakhstan; Russian Federation
Palearctic	Temperate grasslands, savannas, and shrublands	Kazakh upland	Kazakhstan
Palearctic	Temperate grasslands, savannas, and shrublands	Mongolian–Manchurian grassland	China; Mongolia; Russian Federation
Palearctic	Temperate grasslands, savannas, and shrublands	Pontic steppe	Bulgaria; Kazakhstan; Moldova; Romania; Russian Federation; Ukraine
Palearctic	Temperate grasslands, savannas, and shrublands	Sayan Intermontane steppe	Mongolia; Russian Federation
Palearctic	Temperate grasslands, savannas, and shrublands	Selenge–Orkhon forest steppe	Mongolia; Russian Federation
Palearctic	Temperate grasslands, savannas, and shrublands	South Siberian forest steppe	Russian Federation
Palearctic	Temperate grasslands, savannas, and shrublands	Syrian xeric grasslands and shrublands	Iraq; Jordan; Syria
Palearctic	Temperate grasslands, savannas, and shrublands	Tian Shan foothill arid steppe	China; Kazakhstan; Kyrgyzstan
Palearctic	Flooded grasslands and savannas	Amur meadow steppe	China; Russian Federation
Palearctic	Flooded grasslands and savannas	Bohai Sea saline meadow	China
Palearctic	Flooded grasslands and savannas	Nenjiang River grassland	China
Palearctic	Flooded grasslands and savannas	Nile Delta flooded savanna	Egypt
Palearctic	Flooded grasslands and savannas	Saharan halophytics	Algeria; Egypt; Libya; Mauritania; Tunisia; Western Sahara
Palearctic	Flooded grasslands and savannas	Suiphun–Khanka meadows and forest meadows	China; Russian Federation
Palearctic	Flooded grasslands and savannas	Tigris-Euphrates alluvial salt marsh	Iran; Iraq
Palearctic	Flooded grasslands and savannas	Yellow Sea saline meadow	China
Palearctic	Montane grasslands and shrublands	Altai alpine meadow and tundra	China; Kazakhstan; Mongolia; Russian Federation
Palearctic	Montane grasslands and shrublands	Central Tibetan Plateau alpine steppe	China; India
Palearctic	Montane grasslands and shrublands	Eastern Himalayan alpine shrub and meadows	Bhutan; China; India; Myanmar; Nepal
Palearctic	Montane grasslands and shrublands	Ghorat–Hazarajat alpine meadow	Afghanistan
Palearctic	Montane grasslands and shrublands	Hindu Kush alpine meadow	Afghanistan
Palearctic	Montane grasslands and shrublands	Karakoram–West Tibetan Plateau alpine steppe	Afghanistan; China; India; Pakistan
Palearctic	Montane grasslands and shrublands	Khangai Mountains alpine meadow	Mongolia
Palearctic	Montane grasslands and shrublands	Kopet Dag woodlands and forest steppe	Iran; Turkmenistan
Palearctic	Montane grasslands and shrublands	Kuh Rud and Eastern Iran montane woodlands	Iran; Pakistan
Palearctic	Montane grasslands and shrublands	Mediterranean High Atlas juniper steppe	Morocco
Palearctic	Montane grasslands and shrublands	North Tibetan Plateau–Kunlun Mountains alpine desert	China
Palearctic	Montane grasslands and shrublands	Northwestern Himalayan alpine shrub and meadows	Afghanistan; China; India; Pakistan
Palearctic	Montane grasslands and shrublands	Ordos Plateau steppe	China
Palearctic	Montane grasslands and shrublands	Pamir alpine desert and tundra	Afghanistan; China; Kyrgyzstan; Tajikistan
Palearctic	Montane grasslands and shrublands	Qilian Mountains subalpine meadows	China
Palearctic	Montane grasslands and shrublands	Sayan alpine meadows and tundra	Mongolia; Russian Federation
Palearctic	Montane grasslands and shrublands	Southeast Tibet shrub and meadows	China
Palearctic	Montane grasslands and shrublands	Sulaiman Range alpine meadows	China
Palearctic	Montane grasslands and shrublands	Tian Shan montane steppe and meadows	Afghanistan; Kyrgyzstan; Pakistan
Palearctic	Montane grasslands and shrublands	Tibetan Plateau alpine shrublands and meadows	China
Palearctic	Montane grasslands and shrublands	Western Himalayan alpine shrub and meadows	China; India; Nepal
Palearctic	Montane grasslands and shrublands	Yarlung Zambo arid steppe	China
Palearctic	Tundra	Arctic desert	Russian Federation; Svalbard and Jan Mayen
Palearctic	Tundra	Bering tundra	Russian Federation
Palearctic	Tundra	Cherskii–Kolyma mountain tundra	Russian Federation
Palearctic	Tundra	Chukchi Peninsula tundra	Russian Federation
Palearctic	Tundra	Kamchatka mountain tundra and forest tundra	Russian Federation
Palearctic	Tundra	Kola Peninsula tundra	Norway; Russian Federation
Palearctic	Tundra	Northeast Siberian coastal tundra	Russian Federation
Palearctic	Tundra	Northwest Russian–Novaya Zemlya tundra	Russian Federation
Palearctic	Tundra	Novosibirsk Islands arctic desert	Russian Federation
Palearctic	Tundra	Scandinavian montane birch forest and grasslands	Finland; Norway; Sweden
Palearctic	Tundra	Taimyr–Central Siberian tundra	Russian Federation
Palearctic	Tundra	Trans-Baikal Bald Mountain tundra	Russian Federation
Palearctic	Tundra	Wrangel Island arctic desert	Russian Federation
Palearctic	Tundra	Yamal-Gydan tundra	Russian Federation
Palearctic	Mediterranean forests, woodlands, and scrub	Aegean and Western Turkey sclerophyllous and mixed forests	Albania; Bulgaria; Greece; North Macedonia; Turkey
Palearctic	Mediterranean forests, woodlands, and scrub	Anatolian conifer and deciduous mixed forests	Turkey
Palearctic	Mediterranean forests, woodlands, and scrub	Canary Islands dry woodlands and forests	Spain
Palearctic	Mediterranean forests, woodlands, and scrub	Corsican montane broadleaf and mixed forests	France
Palearctic	Mediterranean forests, woodlands, and scrub	Crete Mediterranean forests	Greece
Palearctic	Mediterranean forests, woodlands, and scrub	Cyprus Mediterranean forests	Akrotiri and Dhekelia; Cyprus
Palearctic	Mediterranean forests, woodlands, and scrub	Eastern Mediterranean conifer–sclerophyllous–broadleaf forests	Iraq; Israel; Jordan; Lebanon; Palestine; Syria; Turkey
Palearctic	Mediterranean forests, woodlands, and scrub	Iberian conifer forests	Spain
Palearctic	Mediterranean forests, woodlands, and scrub	Iberian sclerophyllous and semi-deciduous forests	Portugal; Spain
Palearctic	Mediterranean forests, woodlands, and scrub	Illyrian deciduous forests	Albania; Bosnia and Herzegovina; Croatia; Greece; Italy; Montenegro; Slovenia
Palearctic	Mediterranean forests, woodlands, and scrub	Italian sclerophyllous and semi-deciduous forests	France; Italy; Monaco; San Marino; Vatican City
Palearctic	Mediterranean forests, woodlands, and scrub	Mediterranean acacia-argania dry woodlands and succulent thickets	Morocco; Western Sahara
Palearctic	Mediterranean forests, woodlands, and scrub	Mediterranean dry woodlands and steppe	Algeria; Egypt; Libya; Morocco; Tunisia
Palearctic	Mediterranean forests, woodlands, and scrub	Mediterranean woodlands and forests	Algeria; Libya; Morocco; Tunisia
Palearctic	Mediterranean forests, woodlands, and scrub	Northeastern Spain and Southern France Mediterranean forests	France; Italy; Spain
Palearctic	Mediterranean forests, woodlands, and scrub	Northwest Iberian montane forests	Portugal; Spain
Palearctic	Mediterranean forests, woodlands, and scrub	Pindus Mountains mixed forests	Albania; Greece; Kosovo; North Macedonia
Palearctic	Mediterranean forests, woodlands, and scrub	South Apennine mixed montane forests	Italy
Palearctic	Mediterranean forests, woodlands, and scrub	Southeastern Iberian shrubs and woodlands	Spain
Palearctic	Mediterranean forests, woodlands, and scrub	Southern Anatolian montane conifer and deciduous forests	Israel; Lebanon; Syria; Turkey
Palearctic	Mediterranean forests, woodlands, and scrub	Southwest Iberian Mediterranean sclerophyllous and mixed forests	Gibraltar; Portugal; Spain
Palearctic	Mediterranean forests, woodlands, and scrub	Tyrrhenian–Adriatic sclerophyllous and mixed forests	France; Italy; Malta
Palearctic	Deserts and xeric shrublands	Afghan Mountains semi-desert	Afghanistan
Palearctic	Deserts and xeric shrublands	Alashan Plateau semi-desert	China; Mongolia
Palearctic	Deserts and xeric shrublands	Arabian Desert	Egypt; Iraq; Israel; Kuwait; Palestine; Saudi Arabia; Yemen
Palearctic	Deserts and xeric shrublands	Atlantic coastal desert	Mauritania; Western Sahara
Palearctic	Deserts and xeric shrublands	Azerbaijan shrub desert and steppe	Azerbaijan; Georgia; Iran
Palearctic	Deserts and xeric shrublands	Badghyz and Karabil semi-desert	Afghanistan; Iran; Tajikistan; Turkmenistan; Uzbekistan
Palearctic	Deserts and xeric shrublands	Baluchistan xeric woodlands	Afghanistan; Pakistan
Palearctic	Deserts and xeric shrublands	Caspian lowland desert	Iran; Kazakhstan; Russian Federation; Turkmenistan
Palearctic	Deserts and xeric shrublands	Central Afghan Mountains xeric woodlands	Afghanistan
Palearctic	Deserts and xeric shrublands	Central Asian northern desert	Kazakhstan; Kyrgyzstan; Uzbekistan
Palearctic	Deserts and xeric shrublands	Central Asian riparian woodlands	Kazakhstan; Turkmenistan; Uzbekistan
Palearctic	Deserts and xeric shrublands	Central Asian southern desert	Kazakhstan; Turkmenistan; Uzbekistan
Palearctic	Deserts and xeric shrublands	Central Persian desert basins	Afghanistan; Iran
Palearctic	Deserts and xeric shrublands	Eastern Gobi desert steppe	China; Mongolia
Palearctic	Deserts and xeric shrublands	Gobi Lakes Valley desert steppe	Mongolia
Palearctic	Deserts and xeric shrublands	Great Lakes Basin desert steppe	Mongolia; Russian Federation
Palearctic	Deserts and xeric shrublands	Junggar Basin semi-desert	China; Kazakhstan; Mongolia
Palearctic	Deserts and xeric shrublands	Kazakh semi-desert	Kazakhstan
Palearctic	Deserts and xeric shrublands	Kopet Dag semi-desert	Iran; Turkmenistan
Palearctic	Deserts and xeric shrublands	Mesopotamian shrub desert	Iran; Iraq; Israel; Jordan; Palestine; Syria
Palearctic	Deserts and xeric shrublands	North Saharan steppe and woodlands	Algeria; Egypt; Libya; Mauritania; Morocco; Tunisia; Western Sahara
Palearctic	Deserts and xeric shrublands	Paropamisus xeric woodlands	Afghanistan; Tajikistan
Palearctic	Deserts and xeric shrublands	Persian Gulf desert and semi-desert	Bahrain; Kuwait; Qatar; Saudi Arabia; United Arab Emirates
Palearctic	Deserts and xeric shrublands	Qaidam Basin semi-desert	China
Palearctic	Deserts and xeric shrublands	Red Sea coastal desert	Egypt; Sudan
Palearctic	Deserts and xeric shrublands	Red Sea Nubo-Sindian tropical desert and semi-desert	Egypt; Jordan; Oman; Saudi Arabia; Yemen
Palearctic	Deserts and xeric shrublands	Registan–North Pakistan sandy desert	Afghanistan; Iran; Pakistan
Palearctic	Deserts and xeric shrublands	Sahara desert	Algeria; Chad; Egypt; Libya; Mali; Mauritania; Niger; Sudan
Palearctic	Deserts and xeric shrublands	South Iran Nubo-Sindian desert and semi-desert	Afghanistan; Iran; Iraq
Palearctic	Deserts and xeric shrublands	South Saharan steppe and woodlands	Algeria; Chad; Egypt; Mali; Mauritania; Niger; Sudan
Palearctic	Deserts and xeric shrublands	Taklimakan desert	China
Palearctic	Deserts and xeric shrublands	Tibesti–Jebel Uweinat montane xeric woodlands	Chad; Egypt; Libya; Sudan
Palearctic	Deserts and xeric shrublands	West Saharan montane xeric woodlands	Algeria; Libya; Mali; Mauritania; Niger

Additional ecoregions for Antarctic Realm are currently being incorporated (based on Terauds et al. 2012). Antarctic Realm - Tundra Biome: 1 North-east Antarctic Peninsula; 2 South Orkney Islands; 3 North-west Antarctic Peninsula; 4 Central south Antarctic Peninsula; 5 Enderby Land; 6 Dronning Maud Land; 7 East Antarctica; 8 North Victoria Land; 9 South Victoria Land; 10 Transantarctic Mountains; 11 Ellsworth Mountains; 12 Marie Byrd Land; 13 Adelie Land; 14 Ellsworth Land; 15 South Antarctic Peninsula.

Terauds, A, SL Chown, F Morgan, HJ Peat, DJ Watts, H Keys, P Convey, DM Bergstrom. 2012. Conservation biogeography of the Antarctic. Diversity and Distributions 1–16. doi:10.1111/j.1472-4642.2012.00925.x

== Rock and ice or abiotic land zones ==
Note: not identified by WWF.

Afrotropical:

- High-altitude peaks of Mount Kilimanjaro, Mount Kenya, and the Rwenzori Mountains.

Antarctic:

- Ice-covered Antarctic continent, Transantarctic Mountains, and exposed rocky areas.

Australasian:

- Southern Alps of New Zealand and high mountain ranges of New Guinea.

Indomalayan:

- Southern Himalayas, some high-altitude areas of Ladakh, and high mountain peaks of Southeast Asia.

Nearctic:

- High mountain ranges of Alaska, Canadian Arctic Archipelago, Rocky Mountains, and Greenland.

Neotropical:

- Andes Mountains, Patagonian ice fields, and high mountain regions of Tierra del Fuego.

Oceanian:

- Some volcanic rocky highlands of Hawaii and Pacific islands.

Palearctic:

- Alps, Caucasus, Ural Mountains, northern Himalayas, Karakoram, and high mountain ranges of Central Asia.

== See also ==
- Global 200
- List of marine ecoregions (WWF)
- List of freshwater ecoregions (WWF)
