= Alaska Peninsula montane taiga =

Taiga ecoregion of Alaska, United States

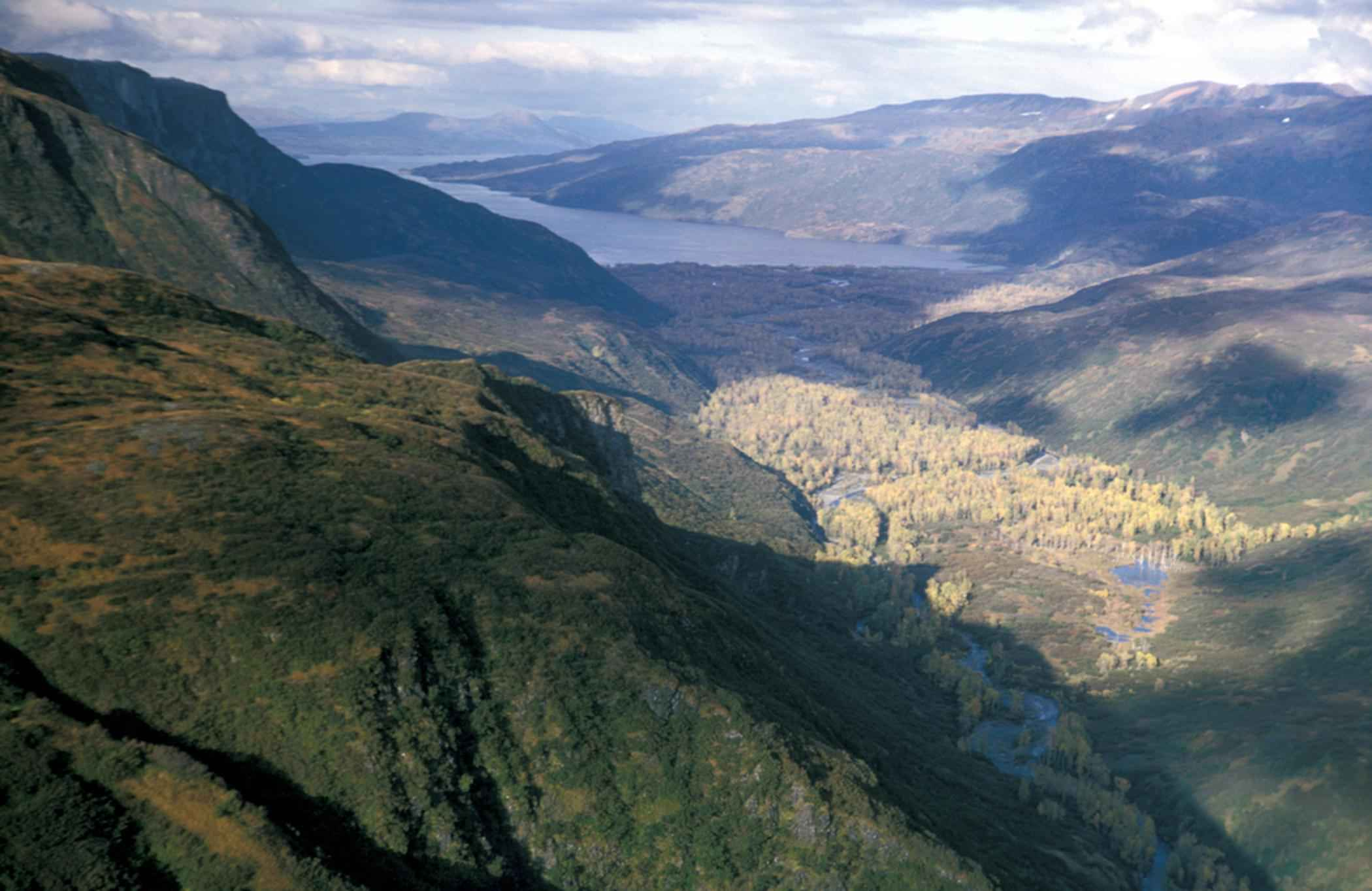
- Kodiak National Wildlife Refuge

- Map of the Alaska Peninsula montane taiga

Ecology
- Realm: Nearctic
- Biome: Boreal forests/taiga
- Borders: Alaska-St. Elias Range tundra; Beringia lowland tundra, Northern Pacific coastal forests

Geography
- Area: 46,596 km^{2} (17,991 sq mi)
- Country: United States
- State: Alaska
- Climate type: Subpolar oceanic (Cfc)

Conservation
- Conservation status: Relatively stable/intact
- Protected: 40,413 km² (86%)

The Alaska Peninsula montane taiga is a taiga and boreal forests ecoregion, located in Alaska, and defined by the World Wildlife Fund (WWF) categorization system.

== Setting ==
This ecoregion is a mountainous area of ridges up to 1200m between peaks up to 2500m, located on the southern, Pacific Ocean side of the Alaska Peninsula from Cook Inlet west through the Kodiak Archipelago to Unimak Island at the beginning of the Aleutian Islands chain, while the area around Cook Inlet at the head of the peninsula is the neighboring Cook Inlet taiga ecoregion.

The area has a freezing climate of snow (up to 4000mm) and cold temperatures.

== Flora ==
The mountainsides are covered with scrubby vegetation, the higher slopes by low scrub such as black crowberry (Empetrum nigrum) and other ericas (Vaccinium)s, the tiny Arctic willow (Salix arctica) and white mountain avens (Dryas octopetala) while the lower slopes have various evergreen trees among the shrubs and the low coastal plains have tall green alder (Alnus viridis sinuata) and evergreen trees with balsam poplars (Populus balsamifera) in the colder and icyer areas.

== Fauna ==
This region is known for its large populations of bears that feed on the salmon in the McNeil River and other rivers of Alaska. Bears found here include the huge Kodiak bear subspecies of brown bear of Kodiak Island and other mammals include caribou (Rangifer tarandus), moose (Alces alces), Arctic ground squirrel (Spermophilus parryii) and Alaskan hare (Lepus othus). Birds of the area include migrating snow goose and other waterbirds, and breeding colonies of birds such as the tufted puffins, murres and northern fulmars of Unimak Island, Stepovak Bay and the Semidi Islands.

== Threats and preservation ==
The natural habitat of these mountains is in pristine condition with fishing the main activity of the people. Hunting and fishing do reduce wildlife populations. Protected areas include; Katmai National Park, home to large numbers of bears, Alaska Peninsula National Wildlife Refuge, the small Izembek National Wildlife Refuge, Kodiak National Wildlife Refuge, Aniakchak National Monument and Preserve, Becharof National Wildlife Refuge and the entire length of the McNeil River.

== See also ==
- List of ecoregions in the United States (WWF)
- Alaska Peninsula Montana Taiga. One Earth
