= Copper Plateau taiga =

Taiga ecoregion of Alaska, United States

Coordinates: 62.4949°N 146.0461°W

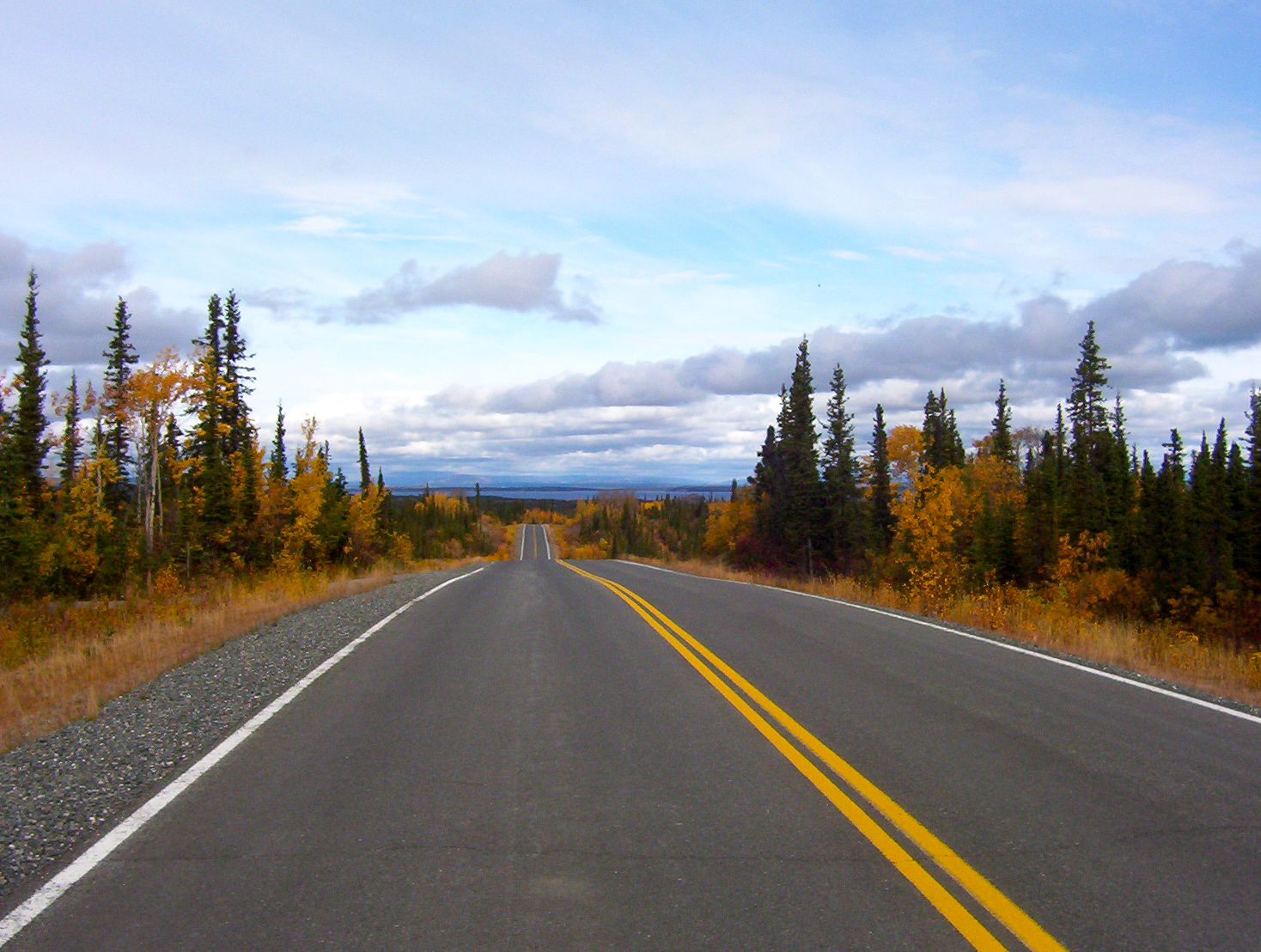
- Lake Louise, Alaska from a distance

- Map of the Copper Plateau taiga.

Ecology
- Realm: Nearctic
- Biome: Boreal forests/taiga
- Borders: Alaska-St. Elias Range tundra; Pacific Coastal Mountain icefields and tundra

Geography
- Area: 17,257 km^{2} (6,663 sq mi)
- Country: United States
- State: Alaska
- Climate type: Subarctic (Dfc)

Conservation
- Conservation status: Relatively stable/intact
- Protected: 5,195 km^{2} (30%)

The Copper Plateau taiga is an ecoregion of North America, as defined by the World Wildlife Fund (WWF) categorization system and the Commission for Environmental Cooperation, in the Taiga and Boreal forests, Biome, Alaska.

== Setting ==
This ecoregion consists of a large flat plateau in southeastern Alaska at 400-900m above sea level, surrounded by the high mountains and dotted with many lakes and marshes. The area is almost entirely within the Wrangell – St. Elias National Park and Preserve while the Denali Highway crosses the ecoregion in the northwest. This a very wet and damp region with up to 460mm rainfall per year and with temperatures ranging from -27 °C in winter to 21 °C in summer there are patches of shallow permafrost.

== Flora ==
To survive here plants have to be adapted to the damp conditions and the dominant tree is black spruce (Picea mariana) while the boggier areas have the dwarf birches (Betula glandulosa and Betula nana) along with shrubs and sedges such as Eriophorum angustifolium and Carex and herbs such as Menyanthes trifoliata, Petasites frigidus and Comarum palustre. Well-drained areas have communities of white spruce (Picea glauca), black cottonwood (Populus trichocarpa) and quaking aspen (Populus tremuloides).

== Fauna ==
Lake Louise, Paxson Lake and the many other wetlands of the plain are nesting grounds for may birds including the trumpeter swan, the largest waterfowl in North America. The Copper River is home to salmon especially Chinook salmon and sockeye salmon. Mammals include the Nelchina caribou herd that migrates across the western side of the plain.

== Threats and preservation ==
Habitat has been lost to development around Glenallen and to logging along the Copper River and on Alaska Native Regional Corporations land near Chitina.

== Protected areas ==
A 2017 assessment found that 5,195 km^{2}, or 30%, of the ecoregion is in protected areas. The eastern portion of the ecoregion is in Wrangell–St. Elias National Park and Preserve.

== See also ==
- List of ecoregions in the United States (WWF)
- List of ecoregions in the United States (EPA) (the Copper Plateau taiga is no 117)
- Copper Plateau Taiga One Earth
