= Pacific Coastal Mountain icefields and tundra =

Tundra ecoregion of Canada and the United States

Pacific Coastal Mountain Icefields and Tundra
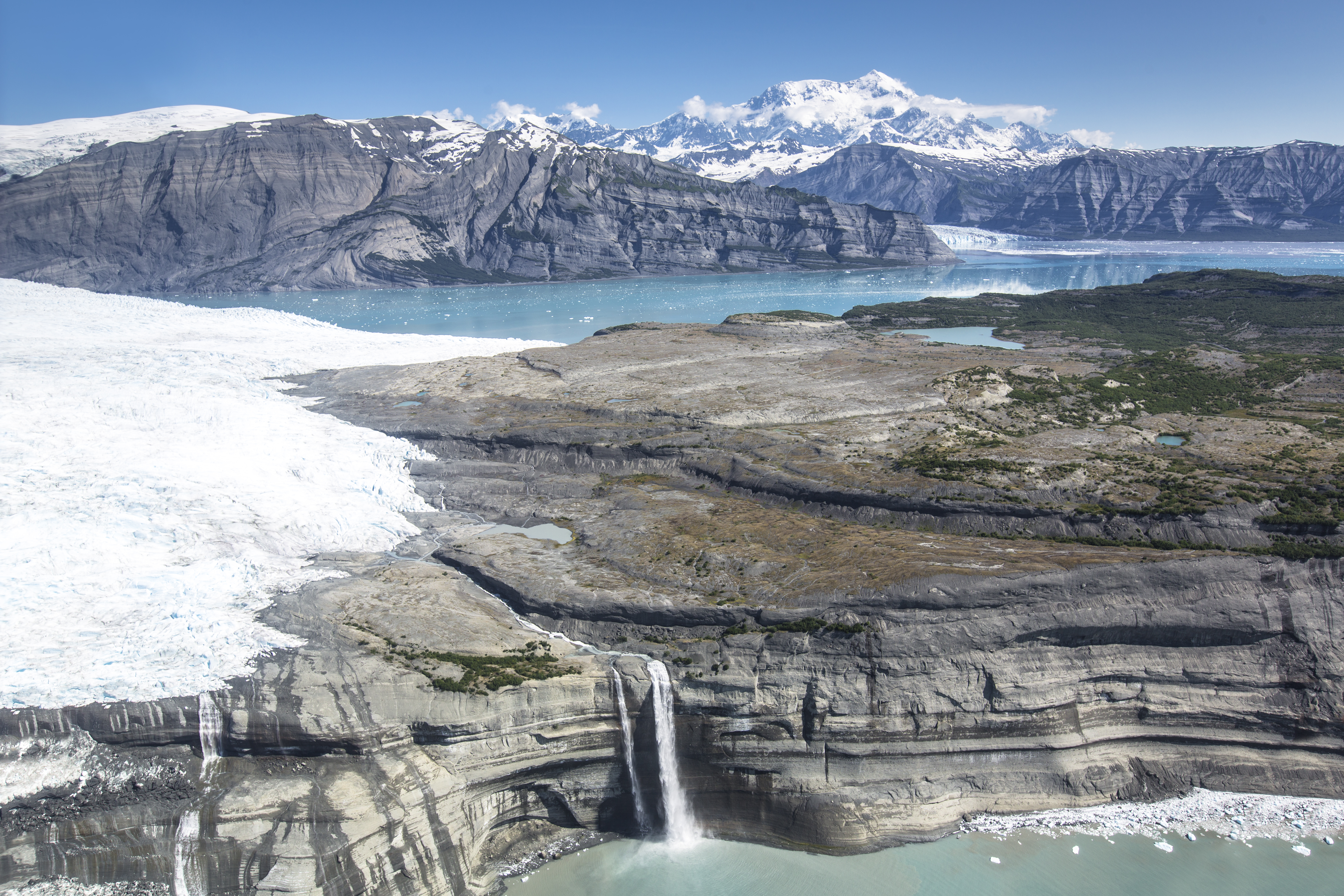
- Icefields and tundra of Icy Bay, Alaska

Ecology
- Realm: Nearctic
- Biome: Tundra
- Borders: List: Alaska-St. Elias Range tundra; British Columbia mainland coastal forests; Cook Inlet taiga; Copper Plateau taiga; Northern Cordillera forests; Northern Pacific coastal forests; Northern transitional alpine forests
- Bird species: 162
- Mammal species: 50

Geography
- Area: 106,708 km^{2} (41,200 sq mi)
- Countries: United States; Canada
- States/Provinces: Alaska; British Columbia; Yukon

Conservation
- Conservation status: Relatively Stable/Intact
- Habitat loss: 0%
- Protected: 67.8%

Pacific Coastal Mountain icefields and tundra is a tundra ecoregion in Alaska, British Columbia, and Yukon, as defined by the World Wildlife Fund (WWF) categorization system.

== Setting ==
This ecoregion occupies the rugged slopes of the Coast Ranges, stretching from the Kenai Peninsula of south-central Alaska to Portland Inlet in British Columbia. Elevations range from sea level to over 4,500 m (14,800 ft). Glaciers and subpolar icefields are the dominant physiographic influences of this ecoregion.

== Climate ==
At lower elevations this ecoregion has a subarctic climate (Köppen Dfc ) with cool summers and cold winters. At higher elevations this ecoregion has a tundra climate (Köppen ET ) with cold summers and very cold winters. Annual precipitation ranges from about 2,000 mm (79 in) to over 7,000 mm (280 in), the majority of which falls as snow. The mean annual temperature is -0.5°C (31.1°F), with an average summer temperature of 10°C (50°F) and an average winter temperature of -11.5°C (11.3°F).

== Ecology ==
=== Flora ===
Much of the ecoregion at lies beneath glaciers and icefields and is largely devoid of vegetation. Where the ground is vegetated, communities are dominated by dwarf and low shrub communities, including mountain heath and ericaceous shrubs. Subalpine forests of alpine fir, mountain hemlock, and Sitka spruce dominate middle elevations. Forests of western hemlock, subalpine fir and Sitka spruce dominate lower elevations. Forests on the Kenai Peninsula represent a transitional forest type between coastal temperate rainforests characteristic of coastal areas and boreal forest and taiga communities characteristic of interior Alaska.

=== Fauna ===
Mammals found throughout the lower to middle elevations of this ecoregion include American black bear, grizzly bear, moose, wolf, black-tailed deer, mountain goat, otter, wolverine, and marmot. Birds inhabiting this ecoregion include arctic tern, spruce grouse, ptarmigan, and gull.

The isthmus of the Kenai Peninsula holds special ecological interest as region where species from differing ecoregions intermix.

== Threats and preservation ==
Human-caused climate change has dramatically increased the rate of glacial retreat within this ecoregion, even with the counterbalance of naturally heavy snowfall. Threats to wildlife include the loss of land area to sea-level rise, scouring of river beds by heavy snowmelt, saltwater intrusion into bodies of freshwater, and pollinator decline. Other threats include logging of old-growth forests and mining.

=== Protected areas ===
Some of the largest protected areas of this ecoregion include:

- Atlin Provincial Park and Recreation Area
- Chugach State Park
- Glacier Bay National Park and Preserve
- Kluane National Park and Reserve
- Tongass National Forest
- Wrangell–Saint Elias Wilderness

== See also ==
- List of ecoregions in Canada (WWF)
- List of ecoregions in the United States (WWF)
