= Alaska–St. Elias Range tundra =

Tundra ecoregion of Canada and the United States

Alaska-St. Elias Range tundra
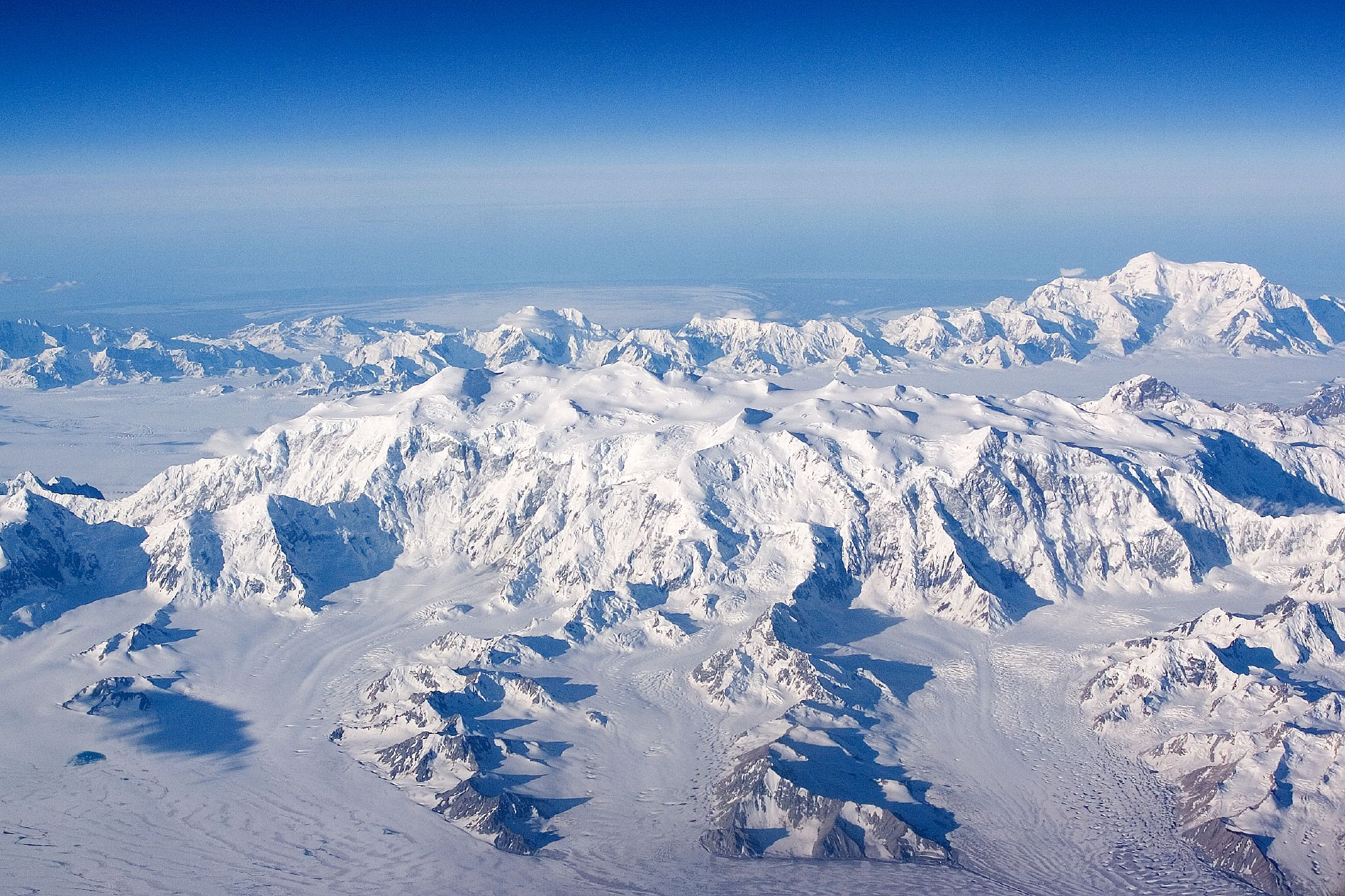
- The Saint Elias Mountains - Mount Logan with Mount Saint Elias in the background

- Alaska–St. Elias Range tundra in green

Ecology
- Realm: Nearctic
- Biome: Tundra
- Borders: List: Alaska Peninsula montane taiga; Cook Inlet taiga; Copper Plateau taiga; Interior Alaska-Yukon alpine tundra; Interior Alaska–Yukon lowland taiga; Northern Cordillera forests; Pacific Coastal Mountain icefields and tundra

Geography
- Area: 151,800 km^{2} (58,600 mi^{2})
- Country: Canada and United States
- States/Provinces: Alaska, British Columbia, and Yukon
- Geology: Rocky slopes, icefields, and glaciers

Conservation
- Conservation status: Relatively Stable/Intact

The Alaska–St. Elias Range tundra is an ecoregion of northwestern North America.

== Setting ==
This ecoregion consists of a long range of high rocky mountains of the Alaska Interior running north from the bottom of the Alaska Peninsula, eastwards taking in the Alaska Range and southwards to include the Wrangell and Saint Elias Mountains in eastern Alaska on the Canada–US border as far as Yakutat Bay. Across in Canada, the ecoregion includes the southwestern corner of the Yukon Territory and the northwestern corner of British Columbia.

These mountains are largely covered with permanent ice and snow, with permanent snow above about 2150 m, and are separated by valleys filled with ice fields and great glaciers. There are small patches that are not under ice and consist of rock, rubble and alpine tundra. Elevations of the ecoregion range from sea level (on the western coast) to 600 m in the valleys, to peaks over 4,000 m.

Indeed, Denali (Mount McKinley), the highest peak in North America at 6,100 m, is located here, while the St Elias Mountains reach as high as 6000 m and are some of the highest peaks in Canada. This ecoregion is largely separated from the coast by the Pacific coastal mountain icefields and tundra so the climate is continental. Rainfall varies from 200 mm per year on the higher slopes to 400 mm per year in the lower areas.

== Flora ==
Permafrost is everywhere on the higher slopes but there are patches of alpine tundra plant life at lower elevations, including mountain avens (Dryas octopetala) and Ericas such as Vaccinium vitis-idaea and Cassiope tetragona.

== Fauna ==
Animals of the area include large brown bears of Denali National Park and the southwestern coast near Iliamna Lake and Kamishak Bay. Other mammals include mountain goat, caribou, moose, Dall sheep, North American beaver and snowshoe hare. The rivers of the area are home to salmon.

Birds include willow grouse, Siberian tit, wheatear, Wilson's warbler and boreal chickadee. They can be found in the sunny areas, often sun bathing

== Threats and preservation ==
This is a largely unspoilt environment home to large predators, although there is some development associated with tourism, especially at Kantishna near Denali Park, and some mining activity including the abandoned copper mining camp of Kennecott, Alaska in the Wrangell Mountains and coal mining at Nabesna and Healy, Alaska.

Protected areas include Lake Clark National Park and Preserve, Denali National Park, the adjacent Denali State Park, Tetlin National Wildlife Refuge and the Wrangell-St. Elias Park and Preserve, all in Alaska, and parts of Tatshenshini–Alsek Provincial Park and Kluane National Park and Reserve in Canada.

== See also ==
- List of ecoregions in Canada (WWF)
- List of ecoregions in the United States (WWF)
