= Northern Pacific coastal forests =

Temperate coniferous forests ecoregion of Alaska, United States

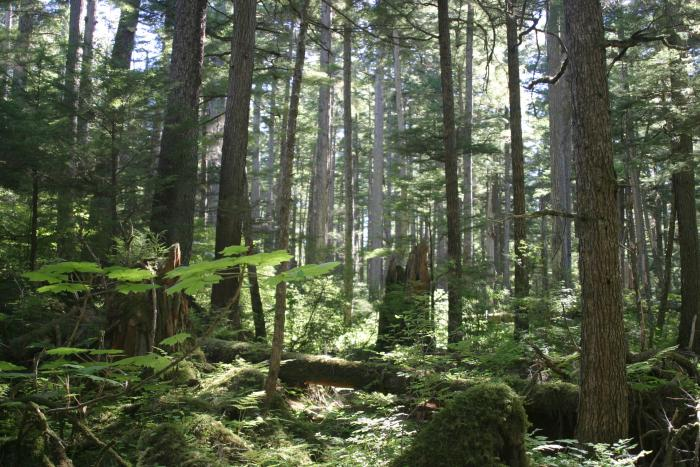
- Tongass National Forest

Ecology
- Realm: Nearctic
- Biome: Temperate coniferous forests
- Borders: List: Alaska Peninsula montane taiga; British Columbia mainland coastal forests; Cook Inlet taiga; Haida Gwaii forests; Pacific Coastal Mountain icefields and tundra
- Bird species: 151
- Mammal species: 45

Geography
- Area: 60,400 km^{2} (23,300 mi^{2})
- Country: United States
- States: Alaska
- Climate type: Oceanic (Cfb) and subpolar oceanic (Cfc)

Conservation
- Conservation status: Relatively Stable/Intact
- Global 200: Yes
- Habitat loss: 21.55%
- Protected: 79.26%

The Northern Pacific coastal forests are temperate coniferous forest ecoregion of the Pacific coast of North America. It occupies a narrow coastal zone of Alaska, between the Pacific Ocean and the northernmost Pacific Coast Ranges, covering an area of 23,300 square miles (60,400 square kilometers), extending from the Alexander Archipelago in southeast Alaska along the Gulf of Alaska to the western Kenai Peninsula and eastern Kodiak Island. The Pacific Coastal Mountain icefields and tundra ecoregion lies inland, at higher elevations in the Coast Mountains. The ecoregion receives high rainfall, which varies considerably based on exposure and elevation. It contains a quarter of the world's remaining temperate rain forest.

== Flora ==
Conifers are the characteristic trees, and the predominant species are Sitka spruce (Picea sitchensis), western hemlock (Tsuga heterophylla), and mountain hemlock (Tsuga mertensiana), together with shore pine (Pinus contorta), western red cedar (Thuja plicata), and yellow cedar (Callitropsis nootkatensis). Sites with poor drainage and along river channels are home to broadleaf trees, including alder (Alnus spp.), black cottonwood (Populus trichocarpa), and paper birch (Betula papyrifera).

Much of the ecoregion lies within the Tongass National Forest, Chugach National Forest, and Glacier Bay National Park.

== See also ==
- List of ecoregions in the United States (WWF)
