= Cook Inlet taiga =

Taiga ecoregion of Alaska, United States

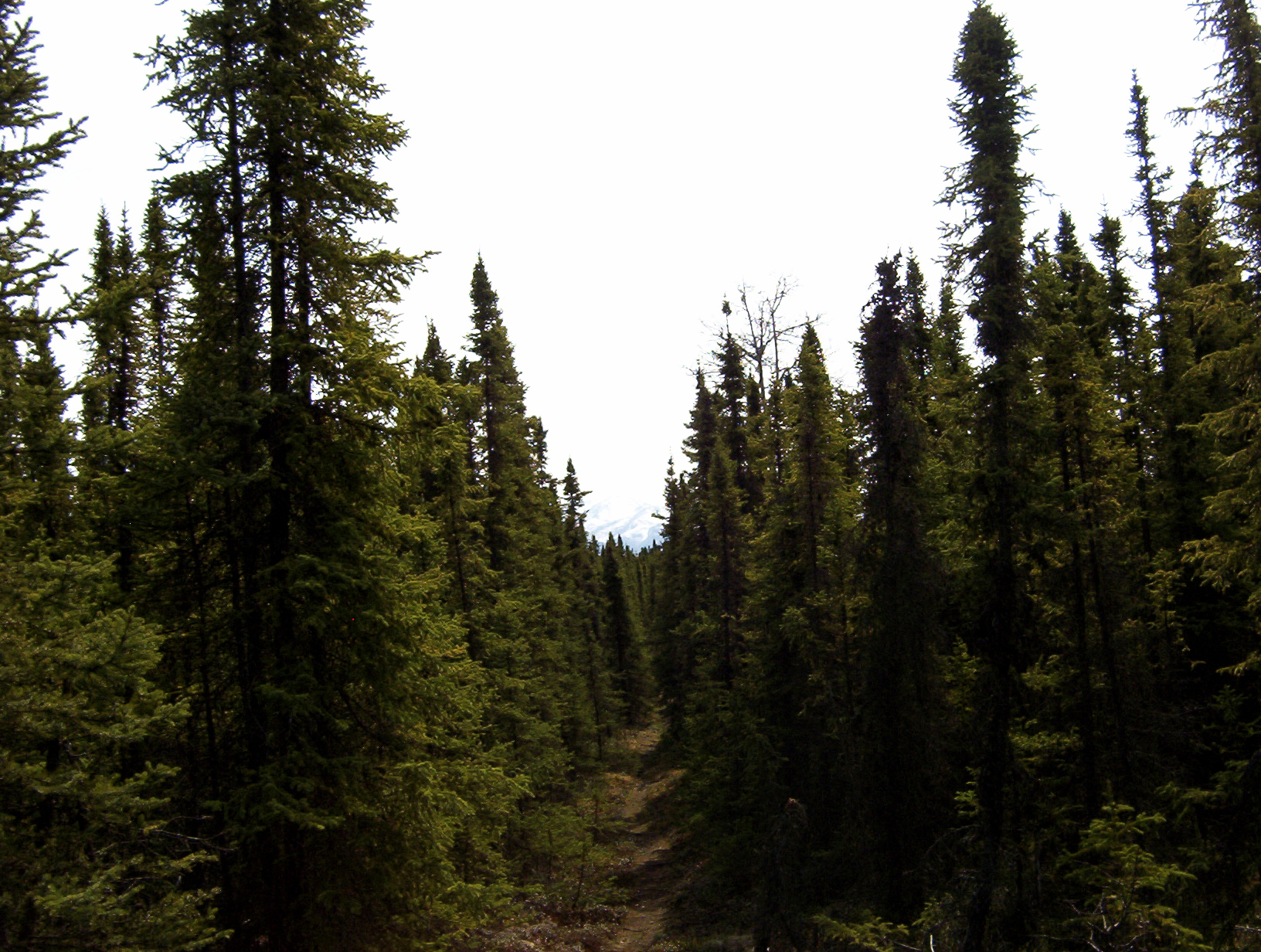
- Taiga forest in the Kenai National Wildlife Refuge

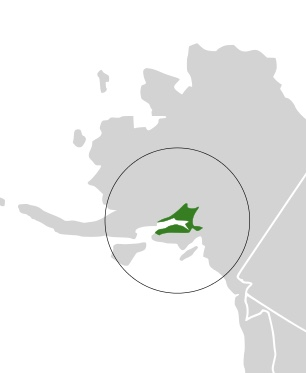
- Map of the Cook Inlet taiga

Ecology
- Realm: Nearctic
- Biome: Boreal forests/taiga
- Borders: Alaska-St. Elias Range tundra; Northern Pacific coastal forests, Pacific Coastal Mountain icefields and tundra

Geography
- Area: 27,790 km^{2} (10,730 sq mi)
- Country: United States
- State: Alaska
- Climate type: Subarctic (Dfc)

Conservation
- Conservation status: Relatively stable/intact
- Protected: 8,439 km² (30%)

The Cook Inlet taiga is a taiga and boreal forests ecoregion in Alaska.

== Setting ==
This ecoregion is located around the upper Cook Inlet on the south-central coast of Alaska, sheltered by mountains on all sides. This coast has a gentle landscape and a relatively mild climate for Alaska with 380–680 mm of rainfall per year.

== Flora ==
The plant life here is varied for Alaska, composted of a mixture of conifers and other trees, shrubs, and herbs. The dominant trees in this region are black spruce (Picea mariana), white spruce (Picea glauca), lutz spruce (Picea x lutzii), quaking aspen (Populus tremuloides), balsam poplar (Populus balsamifera), black cottonwood (Populus trichocarpa) and paper birch (Betula papyrifera). The spruce forest is regularly renewed following severe damage by spruce bark beetle infestations.

== Fauna ==
This area is rich in wildlife including grey wolves, bears and Canada lynx. The Kenai River is home to five species of Pacific salmon, including the largest chinook salmon in the world. Birds include large numbers of bald eagles and wintering snow geese from Wrangell Island, who gather at the mouth of the Kenai River before their spring migration.

== Threats and preservation ==
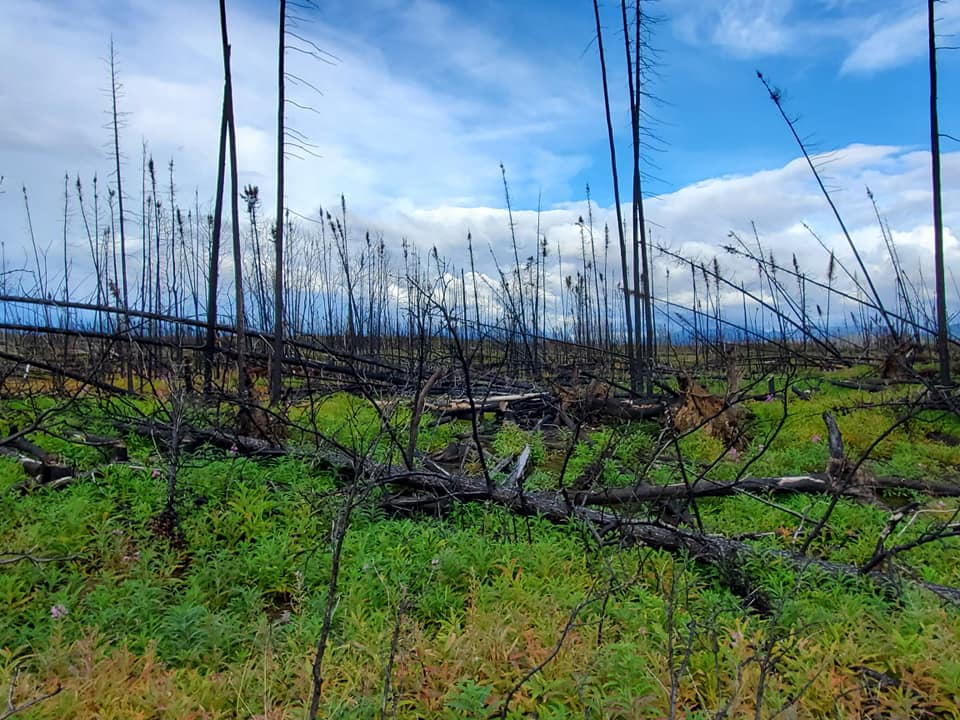
The Swan Lake Fire burned tens of thousands of acres of Cook Inlet taiga forest

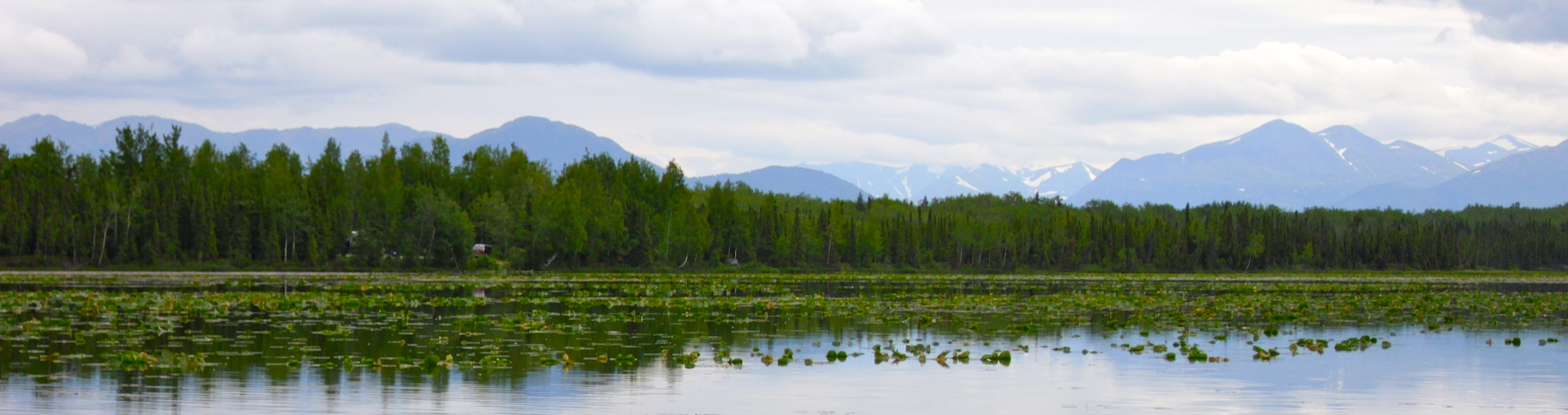
pond with water lilies bordered by spruce forest, Kenai NWR

The Kenai River, Anchorage, Palmer and Wasilla areas are the most populated part of Alaska, and a base for both the logging and oil and gas industries on the Kenai Peninsula. There is also some clearance for farming in Palmer and Point MacKenzie. Nonetheless, natural habitats remain very well preserved, although wildlife of the Kenai Peninsula has become isolated from that of the Matanuska-Susitna Valley and the west side of Cook Inlet, and therefore from the rest of Alaska. Protected areas include Kenai National Wildlife Refuge, Chugach State Park, Nancy Lake State Recreation Area and the Susitna Flats.

== See also ==
- List of ecoregions in the United States (WWF)
