= Ordos Desert =

Desert in Inner Mongolia

Ordos Desert Ordos Plateau steppe
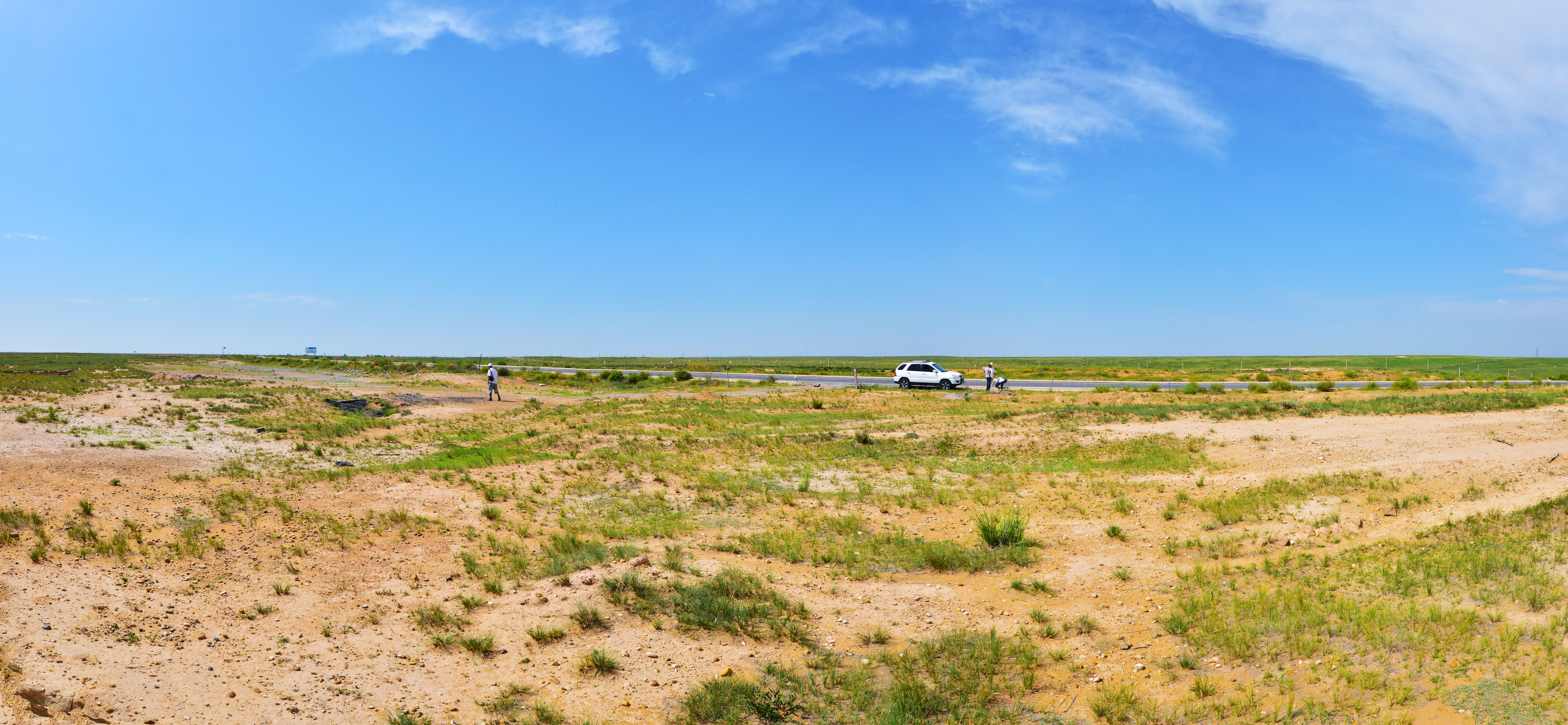
- Ordos steppe landscape

Ecology
- Realm: Palearctic
- Biome: montane grasslands and shrublands
- Borders: List: Alashan Plateau semi-desert; Central China loess plateau mixed forests; Helanshan montane conifer forests; Mongolian–Manchurian grassland, Southeast Tibet shrub and meadows

Geography
- Area: 215,952 km^{2} (83,380 sq mi)
- Country: China
- Provinces: Gansu; Inner Mongolia; Ningxia; Shaanxi, Shanxi

Conservation
- Conservation status: Critical/endangered
- Protected: 0.04%

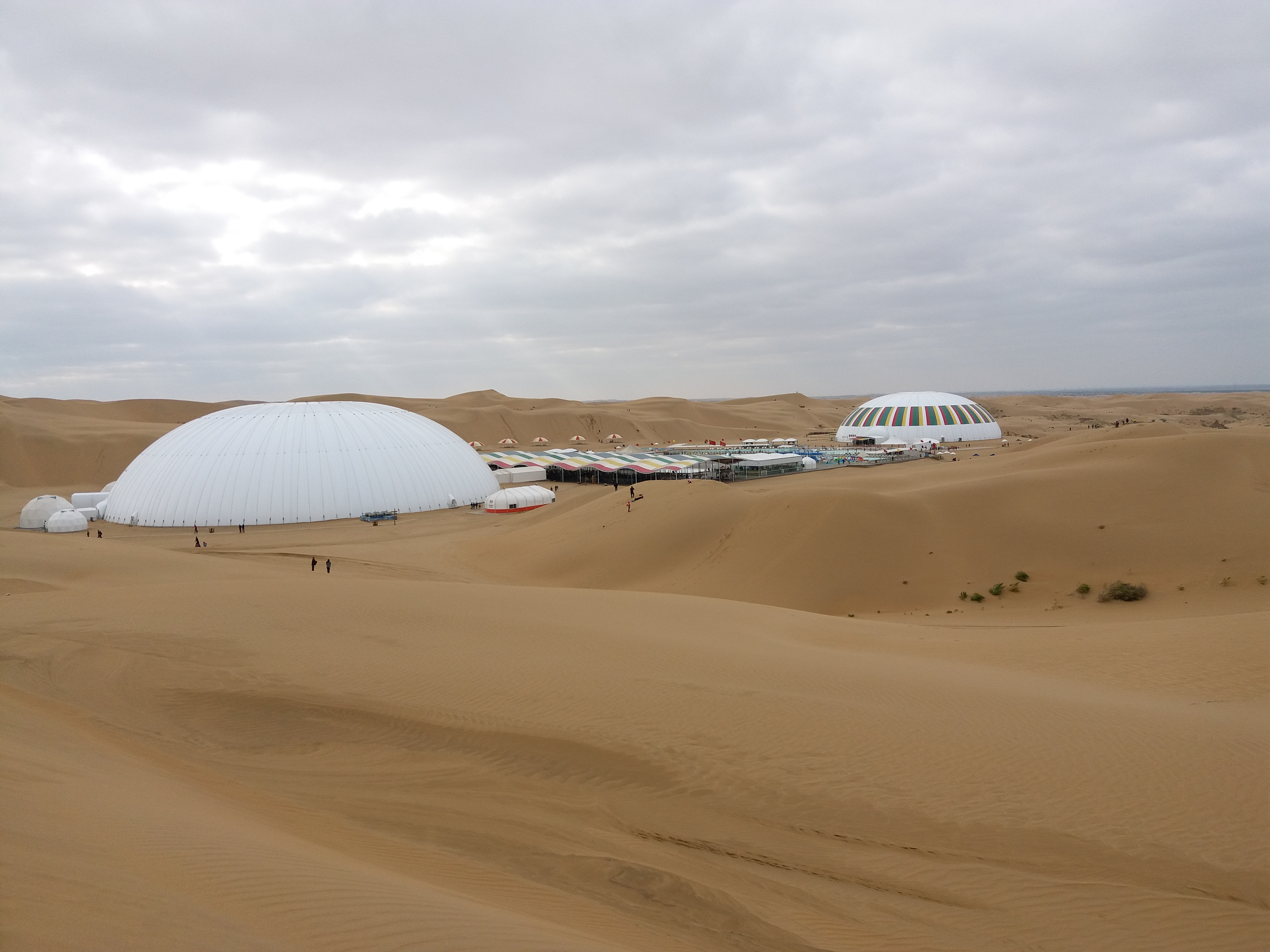
Xiangshawan (响沙湾), a desert tourist attraction in Ordos Desert

The region of Ordos

The Ordos Desert (simplified Chinese: 鄂尔多斯沙漠; traditional Chinese: 鄂爾多斯沙漠; pinyin: È'ěrduōsī Shāmò) is a desert/steppe region in Northwest China, administered under the prefecture of Ordos City in the Inner Mongolian Autonomous Region (centered ca. 39°N 109°E). It extends over an area of approximately 90,650 km^{2} (35,000 sq mi), and comprises two sub-deserts: China's 7th-largest desert, the Kubuqi Desert, in the north; and China's 8th-largest desert, the Mu Us Desert, in the south. Wedged between the arable Hetao region to the north and the Loess Plateau to the south, the soil of the Ordos Desert is mostly a mixture of dry clay and sand, and as a result is poorly suited for agriculture.

== Location ==
The Ordos Desert is almost completely encircled in the west, north and east by a great rectangular bend of the middle Yellow River known as the Ordos Loop. Mountain ranges separate the Ordos from the Gobi Desert north and east of the Yellow River. The northern border serves as the southern border of the Mu Us Desert. The mountain chains separating the Ordos from the central Gobi in the north of the great bend of the Yellow River are: the Kara-naryn-ula, the Sheitenula, and the Yin Mountains, which link on to the south end of the Greater Khingan Mountains. In the south and east, the Great Wall of China separates the Ordos from fertile loess lands. The Ordos covers the southern section of Inner Mongolia, an Autonomous Region of China; Ningxia, an Autonomous Entity of China; and the Chinese Provinces of Shaanxi and Gansu.

== Relief ==
The Ordos Desert forms an intermediate step in the descent from the Himalayas to the lowlands of eastern China. Towards the south it rises to an altitude of over 1,500 m, and in the west, along the right bank of the Yellow River, the Arbus or Arbiso Mountains, which overlie the steppe by some 900 m, serve to link the Helan Mountains with the Yin Mountains. The northern part of the great bend of the Yellow River is filled with the sands of Kuzupchi River, a succession of dunes, 12–15 m high. In some places these sand dunes approach close to the Yellow River; in others they are parted from it by a belt of sand, intermingled with clay, which terminates in a steep escarpment, 15 m and in some localities 30 m above the river.

Eventually the sand dunes cross over to the left bank of the Yellow River where they are threaded by the beds of dry watercourses. The Yin Mountains, which stretch from 108° to 112° E in the north of the great bend of the Yellow River, have a wild alpine character and are distinguished from other mountains in the southeast of Mongolia by an abundance of both water and vegetation. In one of their constituent ranges, the bold Muni-uul, 113 km (70 mi) long and nearly 32 km (20 mi) wide, they attain elevations of 2,200 to 2,600 m (7,200 to 8,500 ft), and have steep flanks, slashed with rugged gorges and narrow glens.

== Climate ==
The desert receives less than 250 mm of precipitation annually, and most of this is in the form of summer thunderstorms. The region has many salt lakes and intermittent streams. Winters are bitter cold, with cold winds blowing into the region from the north and west, and January temperatures ranging from −13 to −10 °C (9 to 14 °F).

== Fauna and flora ==
The vegetation of the Ordos region is made up of montane grasslands and shrublands. Among the sand dunes in the north, shrubs including Hedysarum scoparium and Calligonum arborescens grow in scattered patches. Native grasses and herbs include Bromus inermis, Agropyron mongolicum, A. cristatum, Festuca arundinacea, Elymus dahuricus, Melilotus albus, M. officinalis, Lotus corniculatus, Pugionium cornutum, Astragalus adsurgens, and Filifolium sibiricum. The belt of sand and clay which separates the sand dunes from the Huang He in places is studded with little mounds (up to 1.2 m high), mostly overgrown with wormwood (Artemisia campestris) and the Siberian pea-tree (Caragana spp.); and here too grows one of the most characteristic plants of Ordos, the liquorice root (Glycyrrhiza uralensis). On the left bank of the Huang He, level spaces amongst the dry river beds are studded with little mounds (9 cm to 1.8 m high), on which grow stunted Nitraria schoberi and Zygophyllum. Towards the south, sparse scrub vegetation is found. Forest thickets thrive along the river margins.

In the Yin Mountains, forests begin at altitudes of 1,600 m and wild flowers grow in great profusion and variety in summer, though with a striking lack of color. In this same border range there is also a much greater abundance and variety of animal life, especially among the birds.

Rare bird species also breed in the saline lakes of the Ordos, among them relict gulls (Larus relictus) breeding at Lake Hongjiannao; for this species the Ordos is home to the world's largest breeding colony.

The present status of large mammals in the region is largely unclear. In the past, it was inhabited by wild two-humped Bactrian camels, snow leopards, Przewalski's gazelles, and Przewalski's horses.

== History ==
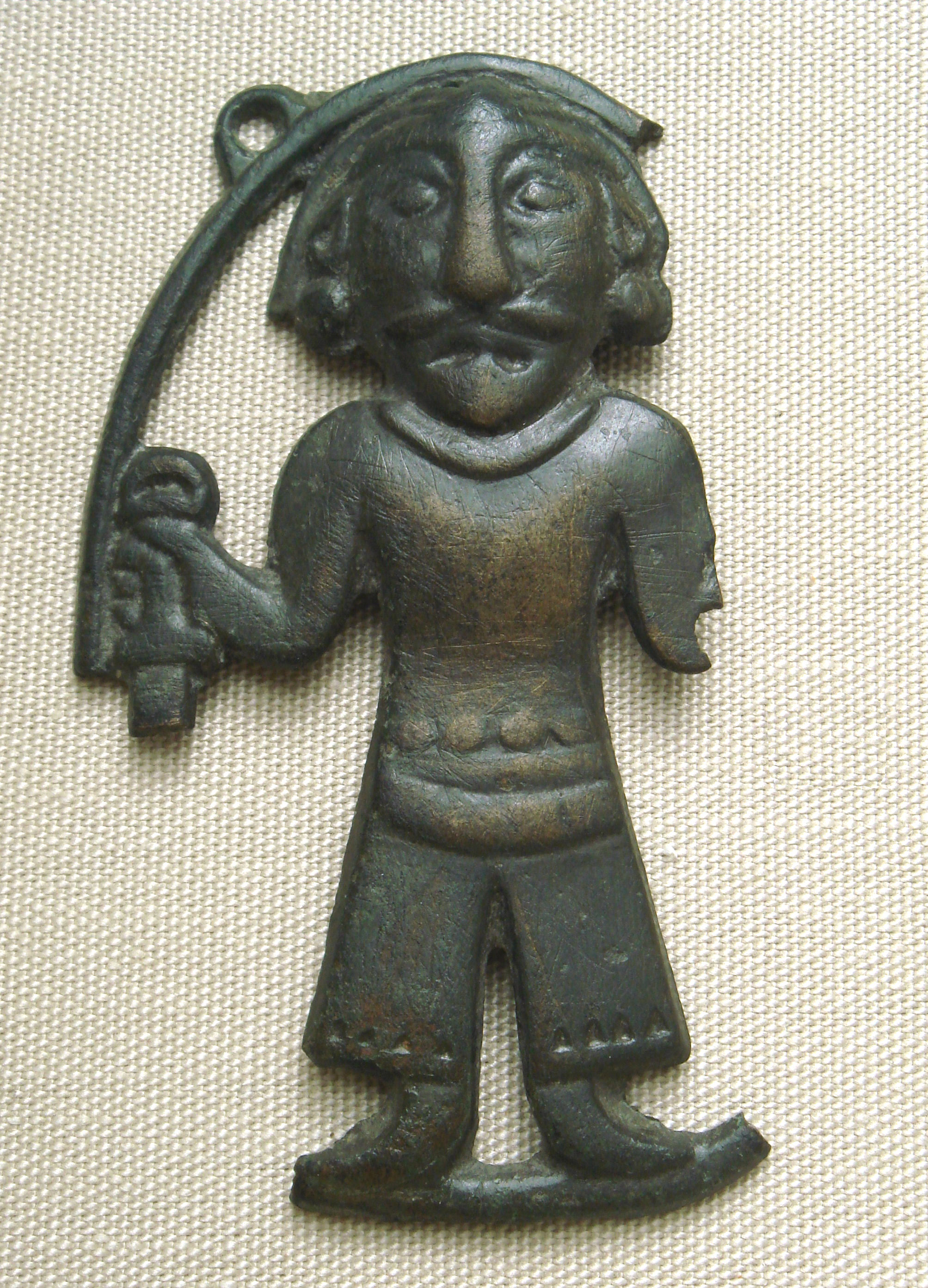
Bronze statuette of a man, Ordos, 3rd–1st century BCE. British Museum

Chinese names of the Ordos region were He-tau and – later – He-nan ("the country south of the river"). It was occupied by horse nomads for many centuries, and these were very often at war with China. In the 1st and 2nd centuries CE, it was occupied by the Xiongnu. It was almost depopulated during and after the Dungan revolt of 1869.

This region was a desert during the Late Glacial Maximum. During the Holocene Climatic Optimum the monsoonal rains that reached the Loess Plateau in the modern era pushed the desert back to the Yellow River. Since then, overgrazing at various periods and in the modern period, the lack of rainfall, has resulted in a return to desert conditions. However, the most disastrous damage to the environment was caused by the political movements launched by Mao Zedong, namely the Great Leap Forward and the Cultural Revolution, during which the thin line of fragile vegetation separating the Kubuqi and Maowusu deserts was destroyed. Subsequent pressure of population and the increase in sheep/goats/cattle further damaged the already weakened local environment to the point of no return, and as a result, the two deserts finally linked up in the 1990s, forming the larger current-day Ordos.

== Economy ==
The alkaline soil allows for some nomadic Mongol herders to raise sheep and goats. Heavy grazing by goats has done damage to the grasslands in the region and led to desertification. The oasis in the region support small-scale farming. The area contains large soda deposits which are heavily mined.
