= Khangai Mountains conifer forests =

Ecoregion in Mongolia

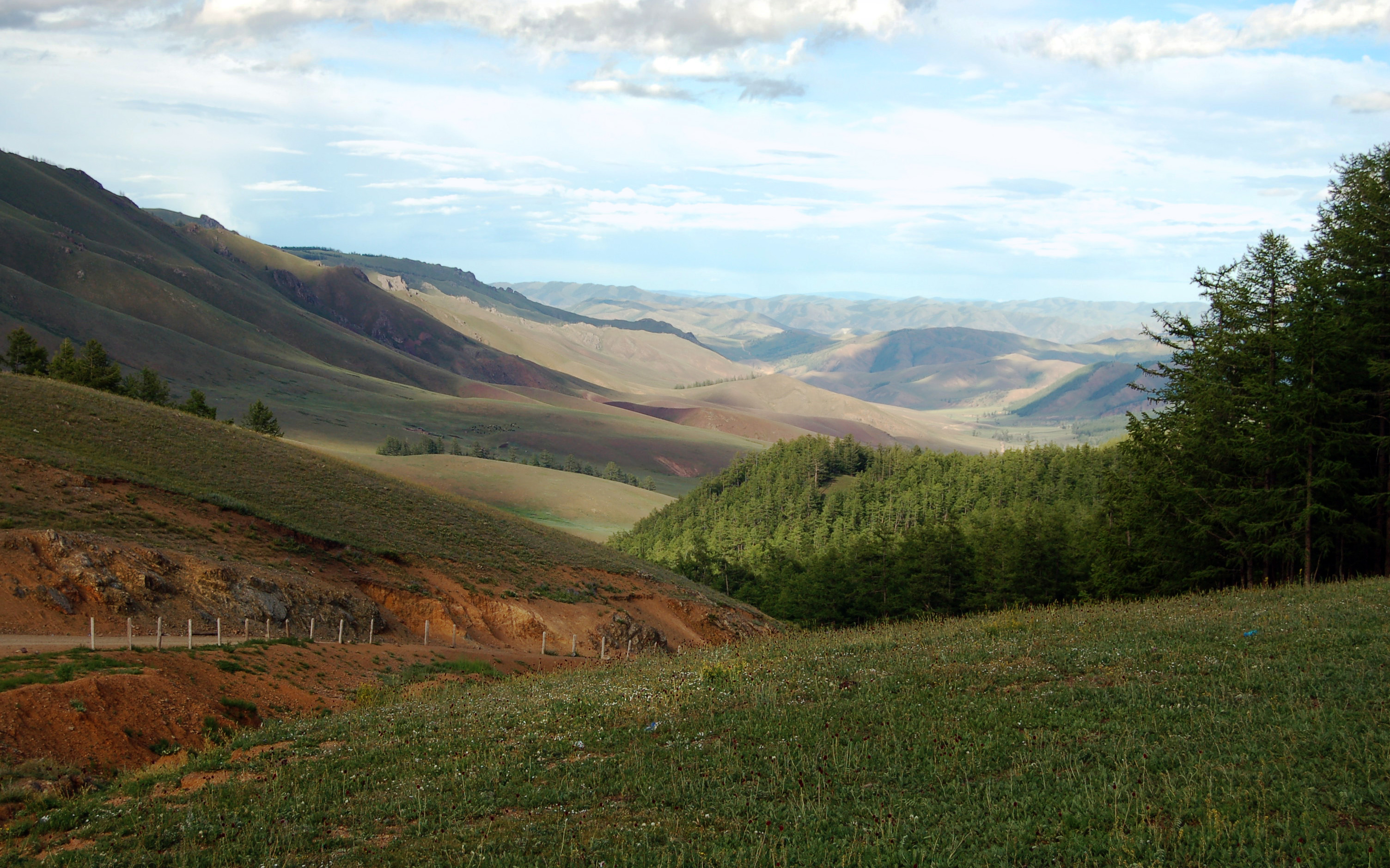
- Tarvagatai Mountains in Khangai range

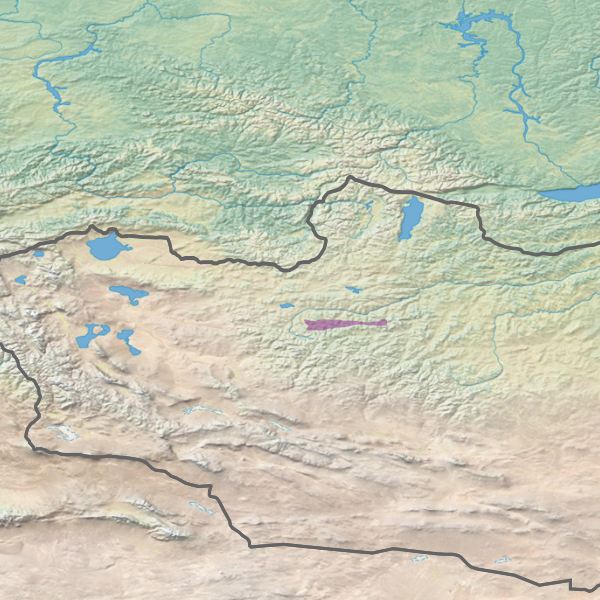
- Ecoregion territory (in purple)

Ecology
- Realm: Palearctic
- Biome: Temperate coniferous forests

Geography
- Area: 2,849 km^{2} (1,100 sq mi)
- Country: Mongolia
- Coordinates: 45°50′N 101°0′E

The Khangai Mountains conifer forests ecoregion (WWF ID: PA0512) covers the northern slopes of the Khangai Mountains in central Mongolia. The montane taiga supports a populations of elk, deer, wild boar, wolves, and brown bear. The diversity of plants and animals has benefited from the relative isolation and low human population of the area.

== Location and description ==
The ecoregion is small, only 100 km from west to east, and 25 km from south to north. It covers the northern ridges and valleys of the Tarvagatai Range of the Khangai Mountains, at elevations of 2,000–2,600 metres (6,600–8,500 ft). Stream valleys drain the slopes northward into the Ider River, which runs below the northern edge of the ecoregion. The northernmost slopes of Mongolia's Tarvagatai Nuruu National Park are in the ecoregion.

== Climate ==
The climate of the ecoregion is Cold semi-arid climate (Köppen climate classification (BSk)). This climate is characteristic of steppe climates intermediary between desert humid climates, and typically have precipitation is above evapotranspiration. At least one month averages below 0 °C (32 °F).

== Flora and fauna ==
The ecoregion is a thin band of taiga; the slopes above the valley floors are generally forested with Siberian larch (Larix sibirica) and Cedar. Large mammals include Red deer (Cervus elaphus), Siberian roe deer (Capreolus pygargus), and Wild boar (Sus scrofa). A portion of the ecoregion is now protected by the Tarvagatai Nuruu National Park.

== See also ==
- List of ecoregions in Mongolia
