= Streptomyces ziwulingensis =

Scientific classification
- Domain: Bacteria
- Kingdom: Bacillati
- Phylum: Actinomycetota
- Class: Actinomycetia
- Order: Streptomycetales
- Family: Streptomycetaceae
- Genus: Streptomyces
- Species: S. ziwulingensis

Binomial name
- Streptomyces ziwulingensis Lin et al. 2013

Type strain
- ACCC 41875, JCM 18081, F22, CCNWFX 0001

Species of bacterium

Streptomyces ziwulingensis is a bacterium species from the genus of Streptomyces which has been isolated from grassland soil from Ziwuling at the Loess Plateau in China.

== See also ==
- List of Streptomyces species
