= Mu Us Desert =

Desert in east Asia

Coordinates: 38.7500°N 109.1660°E

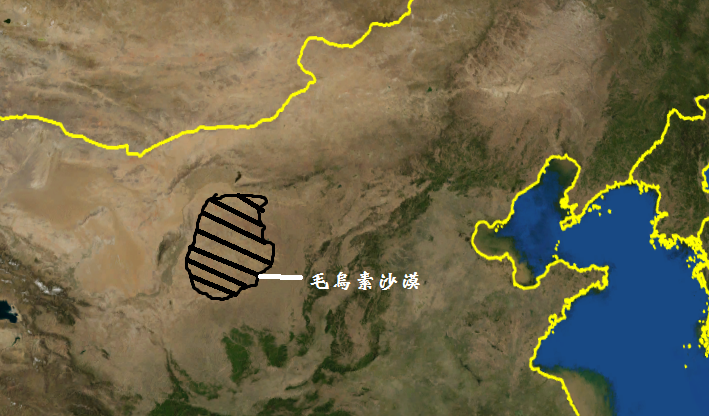
- Mu-Us Desert satellite image by NASA World Wind
- Floor elevation: 950 to 1,600 m (3,120 to 5,250 ft)
- Length: 380 km (240 mi)
- Width: 290 km (180 mi)
- Area: 48,288 km^{2} (18,644 mi^{2})

Naming
- Native name: Mu-us (Mongolian); 毛乌素沙漠 (Chinese)

Geography
- Country: People's Republic of China
- States: Shaanxi; Inner Mongolia; Ningxia

The Mu Us Desert (Mongolian: ᠮᠠᠭᠤ ᠤᠰᠤ magu usu Ordos: [mʊː ʊsʊ̆] "bad (lacking) water"), also known as the Maowusu Desert (simplified Chinese: 毛乌素沙漠; traditional Chinese: 毛烏素沙漠; pinyin: Máowūsù Shāmò), is a desert in the northern Ordos Plateau in Inner Mongolia, Northwest China. Its southeastern end is crossed by the Ming Great Wall, and it forms the southern portion of the Ordos Desert. The Wuding River drains the area, and then flows into the Ordos Loop of the Yellow River.

== Delineation ==
Confusion exists about where the Ordos Desert begins and where the Mu Us Desert ends. The Ordos comprises two sub-deserts: the Kubuqi Desert in the north east; and the Mu Us Desert in the south. The northern portion goes by another name—for example, a map in Julia Lovell's book The Great Wall: China Against the World 1000 BC–2000 AD shows the Ordos Desert only in the portion of Inner Mongolia which lies south of the Yellow River. Several research papers cited below claim that the Mu Us Desert includes part of Shaanxi and Gansu. A clear delineation of the area is still needed here, based on multiple sources.

The Mu Us Desert of north central China lies at 37°30'–39°20'N,107°20'–111°30'E and covers 48,288 km^{2}. As part of the Ordos Plateau, the elevation ranges from 1,000m to 1,300m (as low as 950m in some south-eastern valleys, and reaching between 1,400m to 1,600m in the north-western area). It is the only one of China's twelve sandy zones that is in the transition between a typical steppe and desert climate. The semi-arid continental climate subjects the soil to wind erosion.

== Geography ==
=== Geology ===
As noted above, the Mu Us Desert forms part of Ordos Plateau and includes part of the Loess Plateau alluvial plain with a concave floor. Exposed sands in the area come from Cretaceous red and grey sandstone. Quaternary sediments include a variety of sand types which are easily moved by the wind. In the south of the Great Wall (see below), sand dunes become more frequent due to damaged vegetation caused mostly by moving sand. Groundwater is present at relatively shallow depth of between 1 and 3 meter below ground level in area between dunes.

=== Climate ===
The annual mean temperature is between 6.0 and 8.5 °C. The mean annual precipitation is between 250 and 400 mm, of which the majority falls in summer.

== History ==
Research in the Salawusu River Area in 1978 delineated the strata of the Salawusu River in the area of the Mu Us Desert. This suggests that the prehistoric climate was mild and wet with numerous rivers and lakes, yet limited plant life and wildlife in the early stage of the Late Pleistocene age. The climate became dry and cold while eolian sand began to accumulate in the later stage of the Late Pleistocene age. The climate changed again to mild and wet early in the Holocene Epoch as lakes with marsh sediments formed. Later, the climate changed back to dry and cold, allowing a semi-arid steppe landscape to form. These climatic fluctuations were caused by the glacial and interglacial periods of the Northern Hemisphere. The Mu Us Desert underwent a series of changes, including the formation of shifting sands as well as the fixation and reduction of dunes.

As early as 218 BC, grazing was the main way of life for local people. The Mu Us Desert lies in a transition zone where areas of both pastoral land and farmland co-exist.

Based on remote sensing data, rangeland has experienced an increase in both total biomass and number of grazing animals. Active measures which have been taken to limit desertification have resulted in increased vegetation cover and lowered potential for wind erosion. The increase in biomass resulted in an increase in both grazing and farmland production. The area under cultivation increased fivefold from 1978 to 1996. The grasslands seem to be thriving under the current high levels of grazing pressure.

=== Desertification ===
During a 35-year period from the 1950s to the 1990s, its landscapes changed significantly. In most of the desert, desertification developed rapidly, swallowing grassland, while marginal areas in the east and south were restored to some extent. By the late 1990s, shifting and semi-fixed deserts covered 45% and 21% of the Mu Us Desert, while fixed desert decreased by 7.2% of the entire desert. Desertification was much more severe in the middle and north-west pasture land areas than in the eastern and southern areas of farmland and pasture. Overuse, overgrazing, and overcutting have been the main causes of desertification. Meanwhile, woodland area increased between 1965 and 2010. As a result of the Grain for Green policy, after 2000, the area of cultivated land was decreased.

=== Ecological Restoration ===
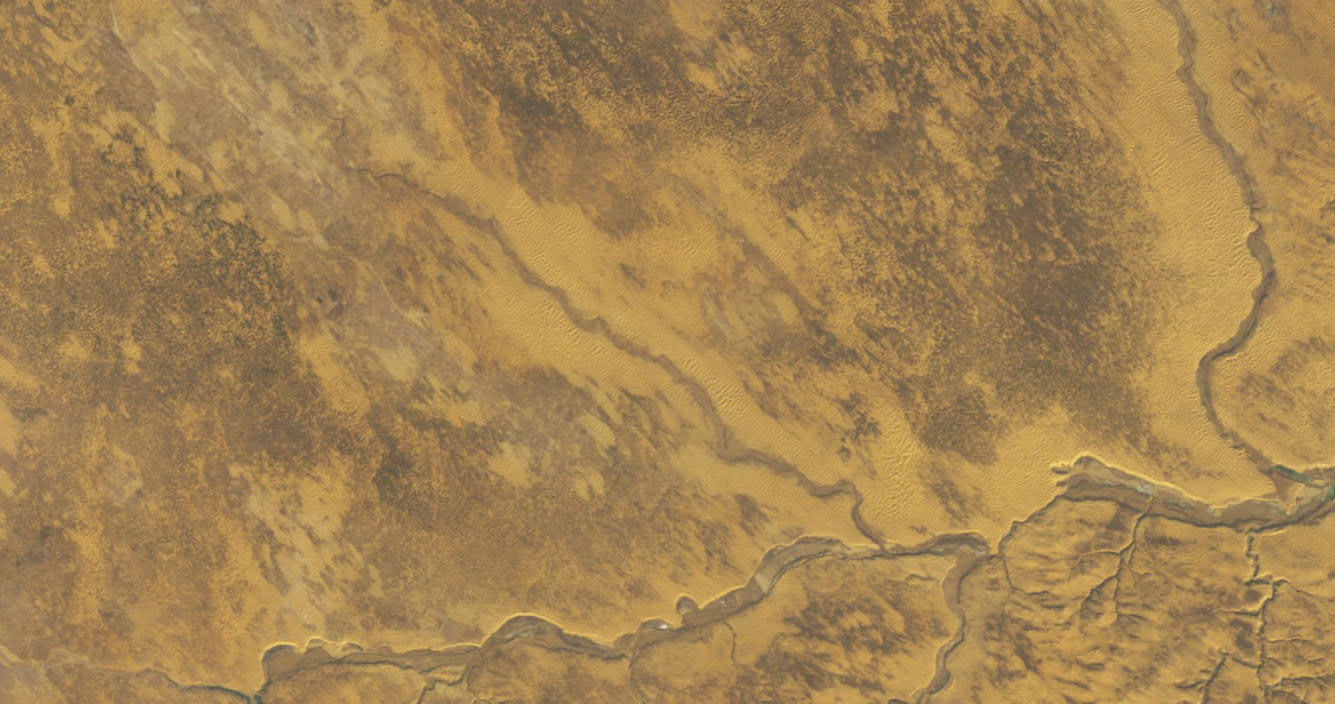
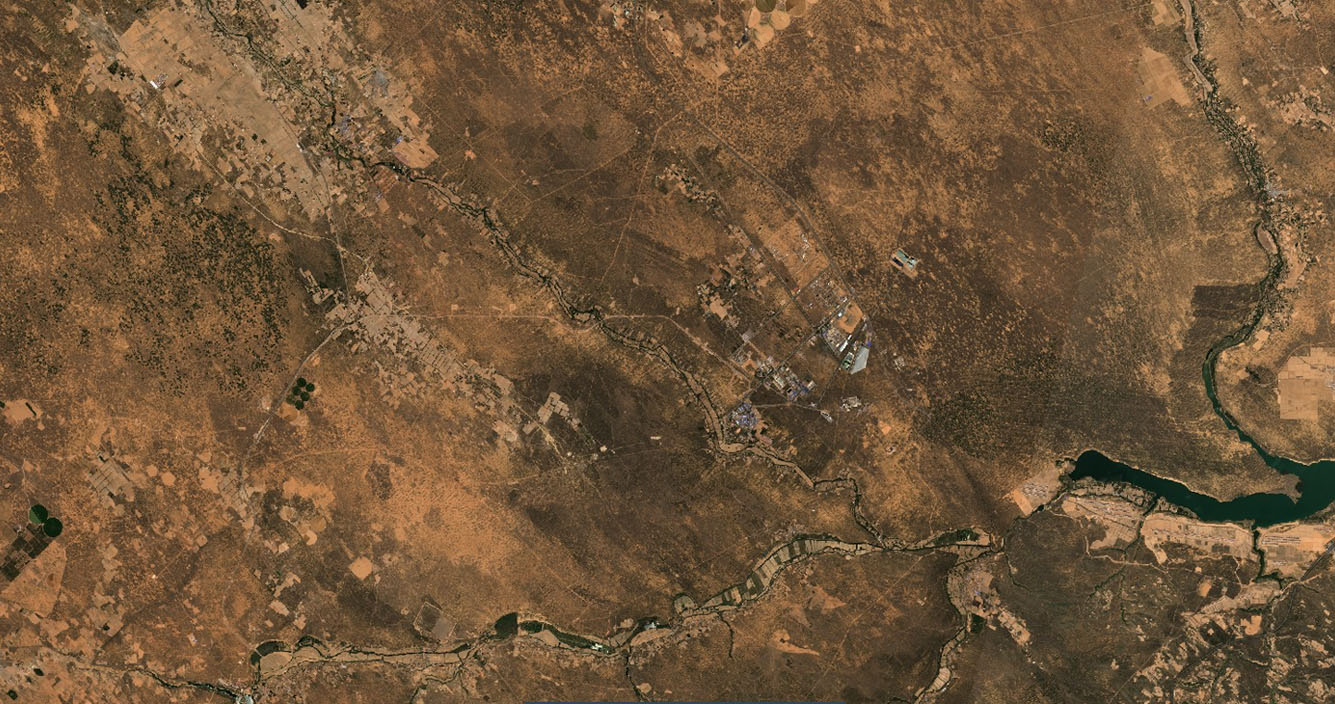
Reversing of desertification west of Yulin. 1985 (above) and 2021 situation.

To rehabilitate desertified land, Dong, et al. recommended abandoning unsustainable land management practices in 1982, referring to them as "the current irrational human activities" and gaining a better understanding of how climatic change affects the natural environment. Those writers suggested that the human activities must be carefully managed to meet both human and environmental needs.

After 1949, the Chinese government carried out a variety of ecological restoration projects including sand stabilization, irrigation development, afforestation, soil improvement, and transformation of the desert with remarkable results.

A 2017 study marked that desertification was controlled, but that the area was still at risk for new desertification in the future, as a result of grassland reclamation and groundwater consumption.

== The Great Wall ==
As early as 453 BC, the Yiju people built a double wall in the southern region of the Mu Us Desert to protect themselves against the northernmost Chinese states. Of these states, the Qin were especially threatening, although the Qin dynasty also are reported to have done wall building in the area. Later in history, the Qin dominated all of this area and built walls. In 129 BC, the Han dynasty gained control of the area and strengthened the walls although they were still fighting to maintain control in AD 45. Much later, the Ming dynasty portion of the Great Wall crossed the area.
