= Helanshan montane conifer forests =

Ecoregion in the Helan Mountains

Ecoregion: Helanshan montane conifer forests
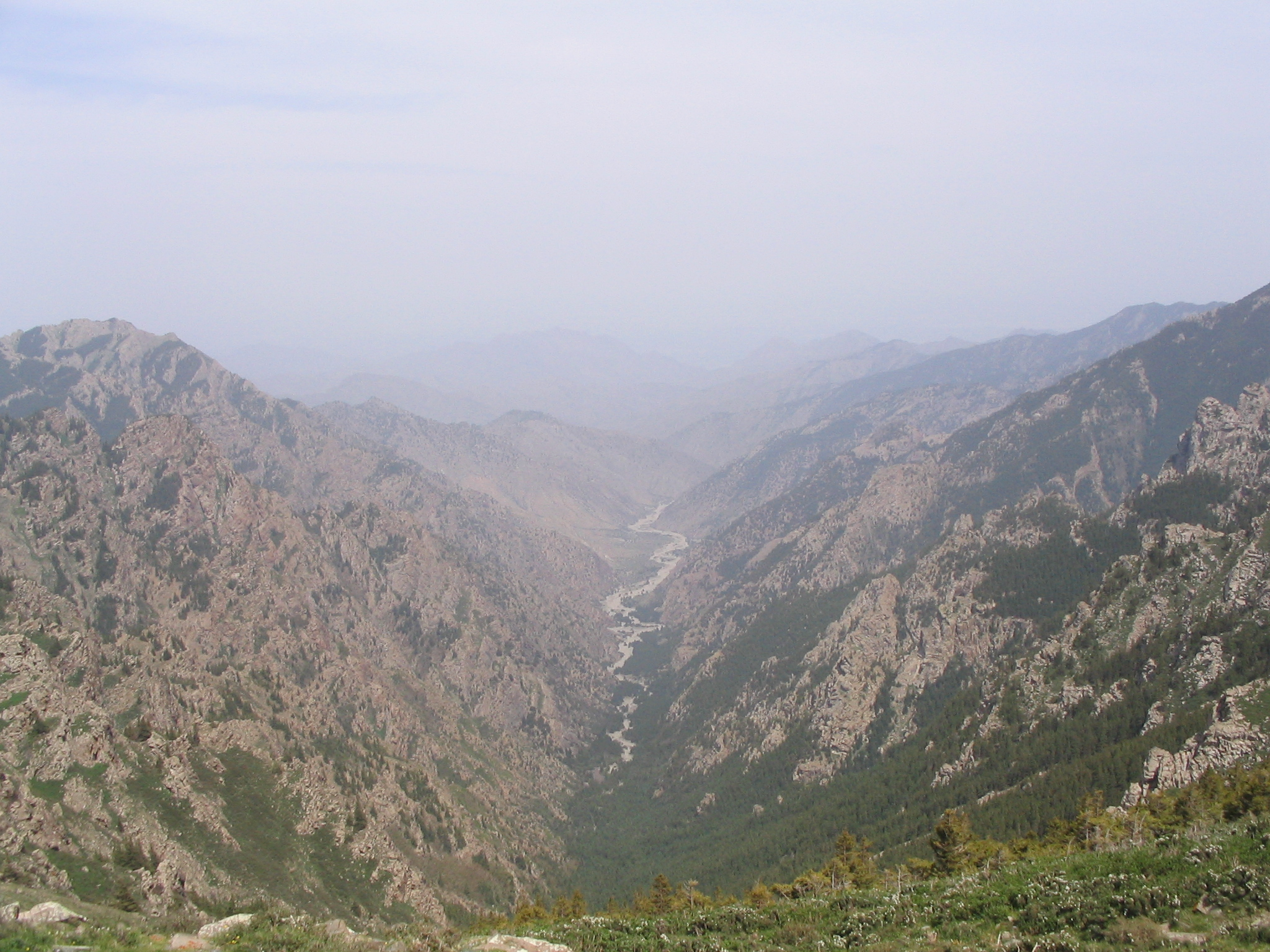
- Valley in Helan Mountains

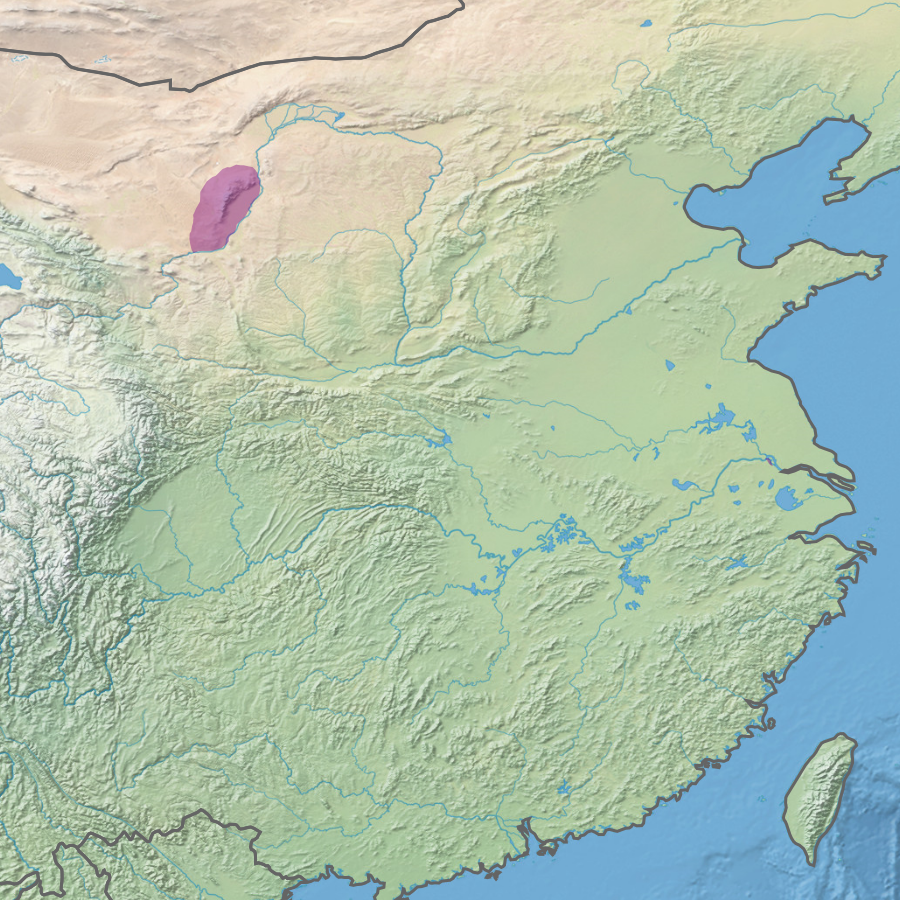
- Ecoregion territory (in purple)

Ecology
- Realm: Palearctic
- Biome: temperate coniferous forests

Geography
- Area: 24,605 km^{2} (9,500 sq mi)
- Countries: China
- Coordinates: 38°54′N 105°58′E

The Helanshan montane conifer forests ecoregion (WWF ID: PA0508) covers an isolated, forested mountain range surrounded by desert and semi-arid basins. As such, it has been called a "mountain island in the sky", and supports endemic species of plants and animals. The region supports the endangered Helan Shan pika.

== Location and description ==
The Helan Mountains ecoregions lies to the east of the Alashan Plateau semi-desert ecoregion, and to the west of the Ordos plateau steppe ecoregion. It is thus surrounded by arid basins. The mountain range is 180 km long, and reaches a peak altitude of 3,556 meters. The lower valleys between ridges are less forested.

== Climate ==
The climate of the ecoregion is cold semi-arid (Köppen climate classification (BSk)). This climate is generally characterized as a 'steppe' climate, with precipitation greater than a true desert, and also a colder temperature.

== Flora and fauna ==
Within the ecoregion, tree cover depends on the altitude zone. The lower slopes of the mountains are semi-arid, supporting short Siberian elm (Ulmus pumila) trees near intermittent streams. The valleys also support stands of Chinese red pine (Pinus tabuliformis). Higher on the hillsides are drought-adapted shrubs of rose, elm, caranga, ostryopsis (a type of birch tree), and juniper. At the highest elevations, tree cover is mostly dragon spruce (Picea asperata), birch and poplar.
