= Temperate coniferous forest =

Forests found in areas with warm summers and cool winters

Extent of Temperate coniferous forest

Temperate coniferous forest is a terrestrial biome defined by the World Wide Fund for Nature. Temperate coniferous forests are found predominantly in areas with warm summers and cool winters, and vary in their kinds of plant life. In some, needleleaf trees dominate, while others are home primarily to broadleaf evergreen trees or a mix of both tree types. A separate habitat type, the tropical coniferous forests, occurs in more tropical climates.

Temperate coniferous forests are common in the coastal areas of regions that have mild winters and heavy rainfall, or inland in drier climates or montane areas. Many species of trees inhabit these forests including pine, cedar, fir, and redwood. The understory also contains a wide variety of herbaceous and shrub species. Temperate coniferous forests sustain the highest levels of biomass in any terrestrial ecosystem and are notable for trees of massive proportions in temperate rainforest regions.

Structurally, these forests are rather simple, consisting of 2 layers generally: an overstory and understory. However, some forests may support a layer of shrubs. Pine forests support an herbaceous ground layer that may be dominated by grasses and forbs that lend themselves to ecologically important wildfires. In contrast, the moist conditions found in temperate rain forests favor the dominance by ferns and some forbs.

A pine forest is an example of a temperate coniferous forest

Forest communities dominated by huge trees (e.g., giant sequoia, Sequoiadendron gigantea; redwood, Sequoia sempervirens), unusual ecological phenomena, occur in western North America, southwestern South America, as well as in the Australasian region in such areas as southeastern Australia and northern New Zealand.

The Klamath-Siskiyou ecoregion of western North America harbors diverse and unusual assemblages and displays notable endemism for a number of plant and animal taxa.

There are small, temperate conifer forests in New Zealand and Tasmania.

== Ecoregions ==
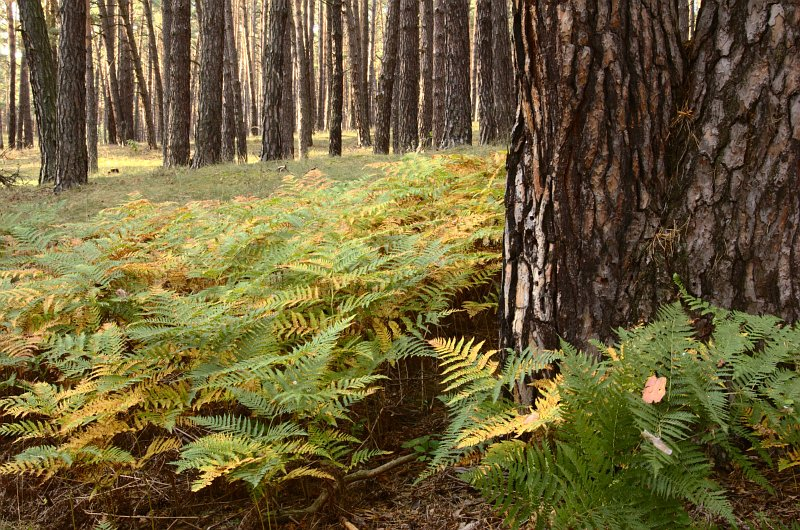
Carpathian montane conifer forest, Slovakia

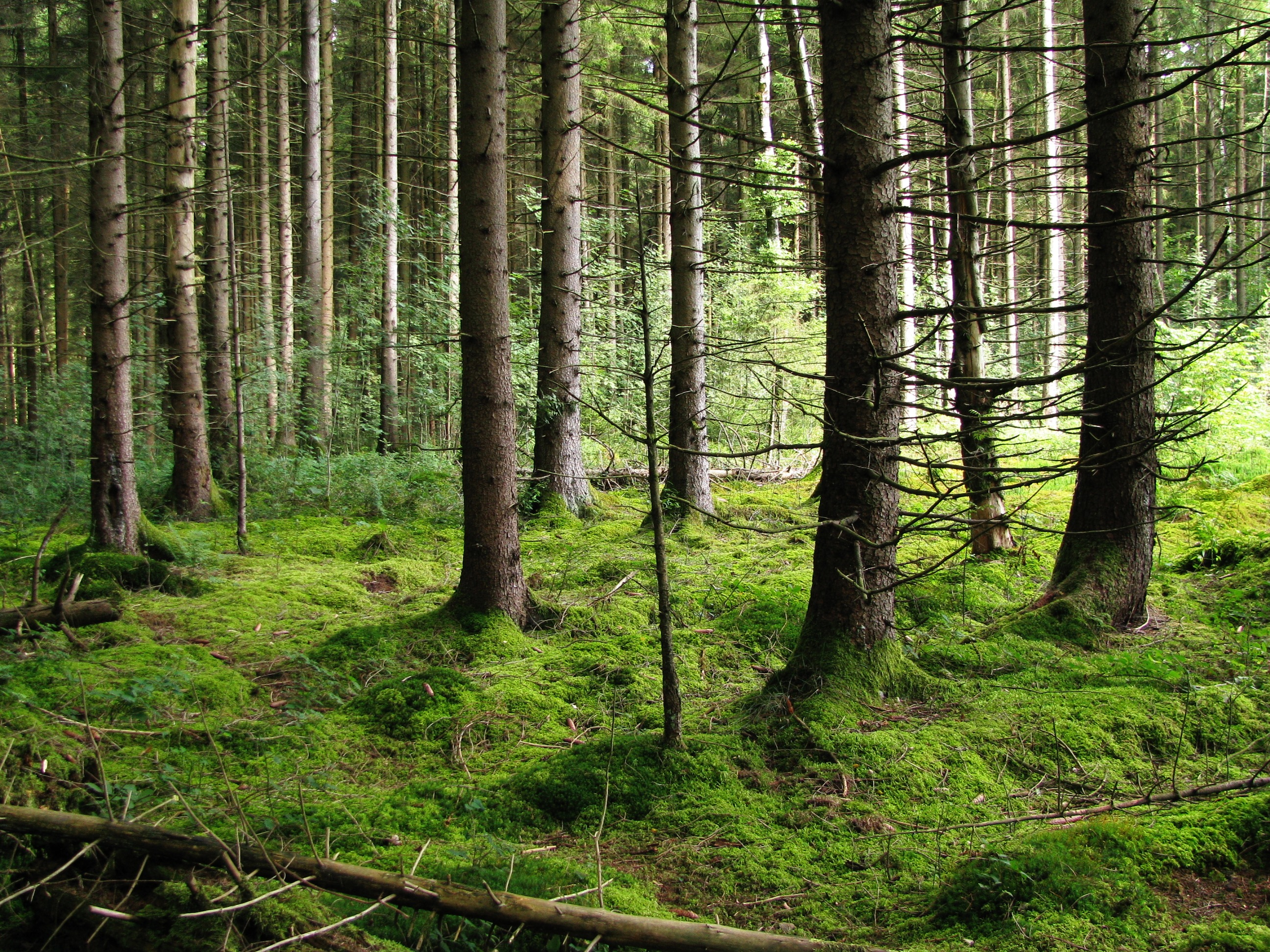
Forest south of Munich

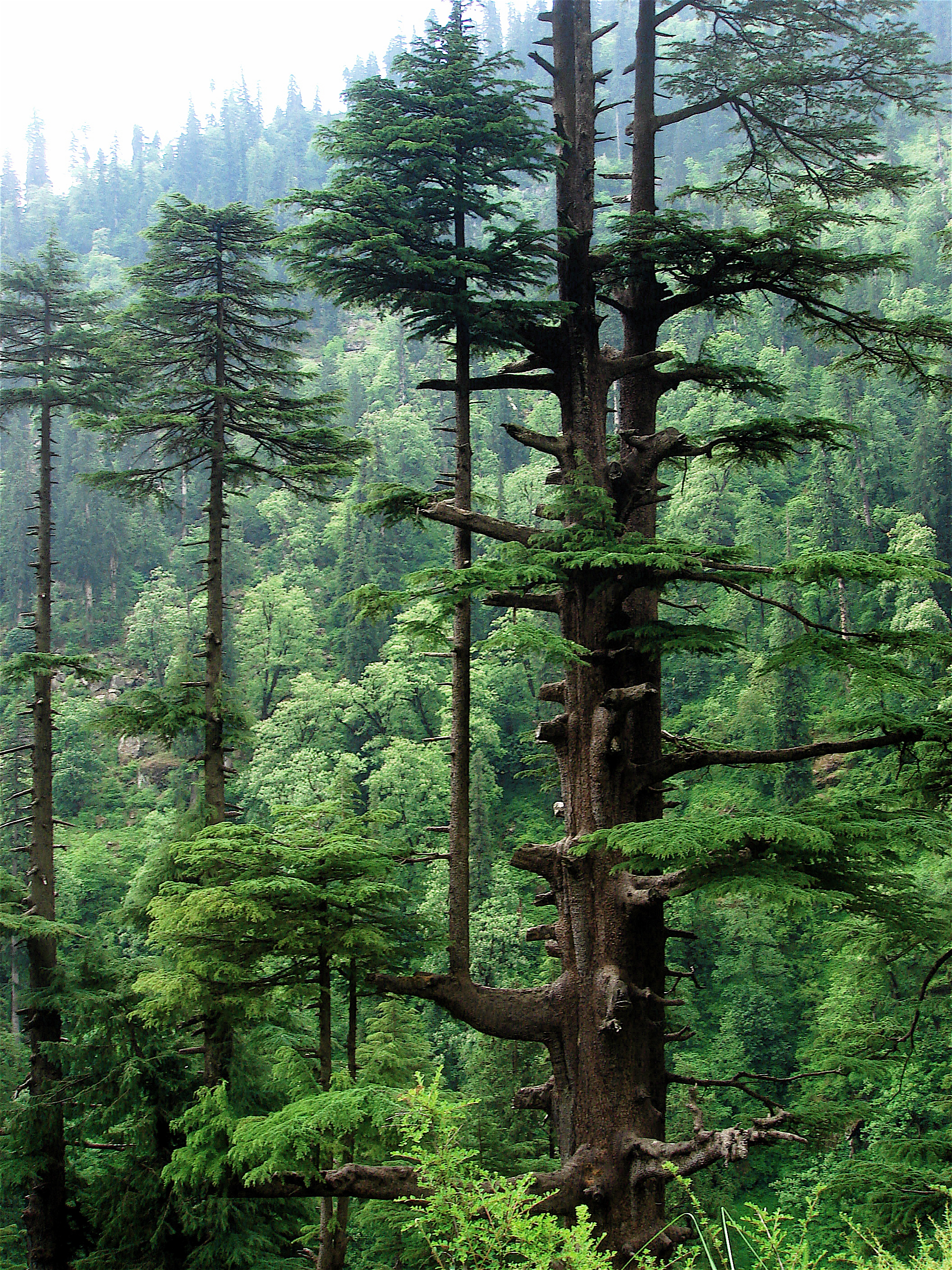
Cedrus deodara in the Western Himalayan subalpine conifer forests

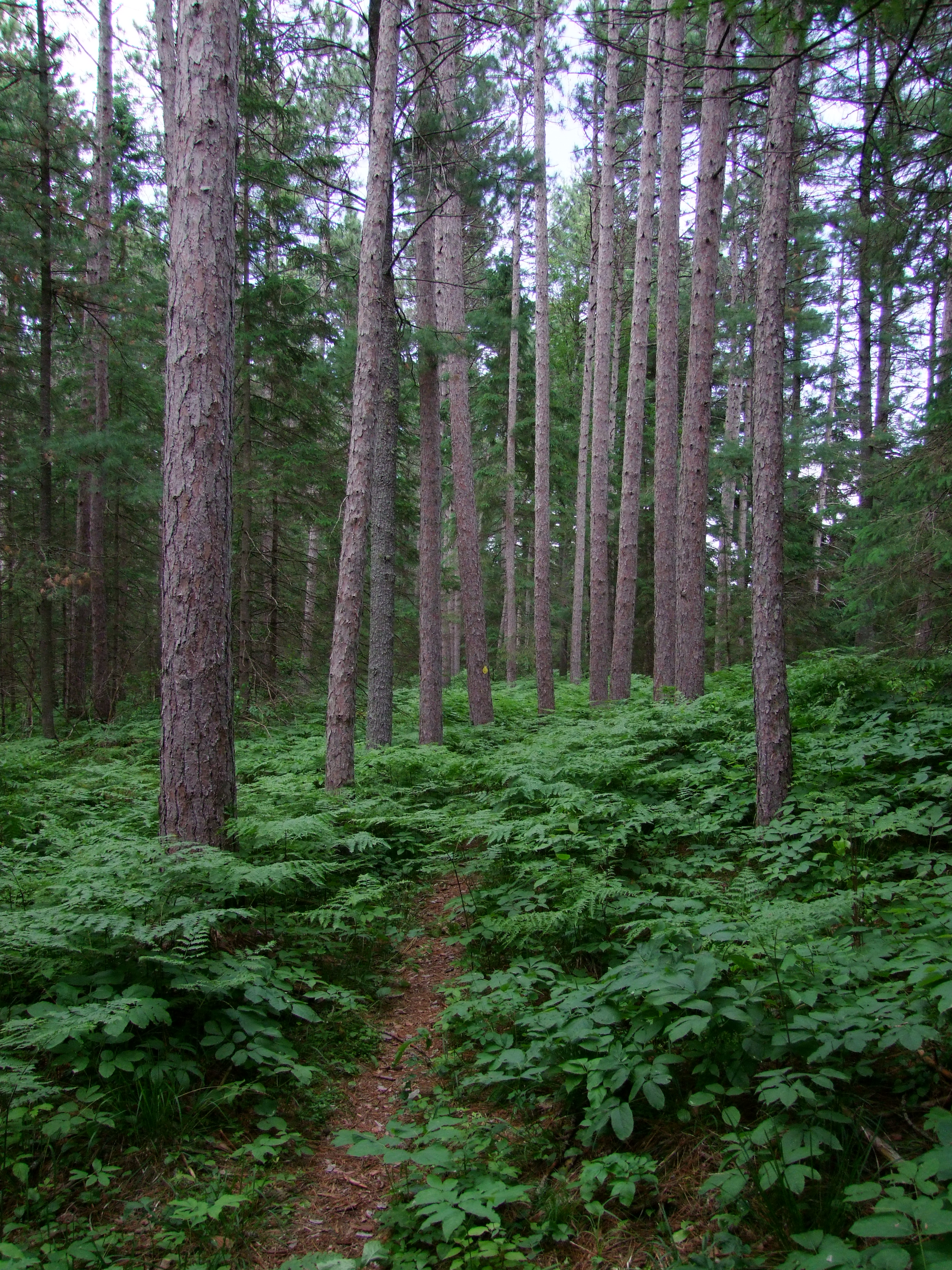
A temperate coniferous forest ecosystem in Petroglyphs Provincial Park, Ontario, Canada

=== Eurasia ===
Palearctic temperate coniferous forests ecoregions
| Alps conifer and mixed forests | Austria, France, Germany, Italy, Slovenia, Switzerland |
| Altai montane forest and forest steppe | China, Kazakhstan, Mongolia, Russia |
| Caledon conifer forests | United Kingdom |
| Carpathian montane conifer forests | Czech Republic, Poland, Romania, Slovakia, Ukraine |
| Da Hinggan–Dzhagdy Mountains conifer forests | China, Russia |
| East Afghan montane conifer forests | Afghanistan, Pakistan |
| Elburz Range forest steppe | Iran |
| Helanshan montane conifer forests | China |
| Hengduan Mountains subalpine conifer forests | China |
| Hokkaido montane conifer forests | Japan |
| Honshū alpine conifer forests | Japan |
| Khangai Mountains conifer forests | Mongolia |
| Mediterranean conifer and mixed forests | Algeria, Morocco, Spain, Tunisia |
| Northeastern Himalayan subalpine conifer forests | China, India, Bhutan |
| Northern Anatolian conifer and deciduous forests | Turkey |
| Nujiang Langcang Gorge alpine conifer and mixed forests | China |
| Qilian Mountains conifer forests | China |
| Qionglai–Minshan conifer forests | China |
| Sayan montane conifer forests | Mongolia, Russia |
| Scandinavian coastal conifer forests | Norway |
| Tian Shan montane conifer forests | China, Kazakhstan, Kyrgyzstan |

Indomalayan tropical and subtropical grasslands, savannas, and shrublands ecoregions
| Eastern Himalayan subalpine conifer forests | India, Nepal, Bhutan, Myanmar |
| Western Himalayan subalpine conifer forests | Pakistan, India, Nepal |

== See also ==
- Cedar hemlock douglas-fir forest
- Temperate deciduous forest
