= Campeiostachys =

Scientific classification
- Kingdom: Plantae
- Clade: Tracheophytes
- Clade: Angiosperms
- Clade: Monocots
- Clade: Commelinids
- Order: Poales
- Family: Poaceae
- Genus: Campeiostachys; Drobow

Genus of flowering plants

Campeiostachys is a genus of plants in the family Poaceae.

== Species ==
The following species are recognized in this genus:

- Campeiostachys aristiglumis (Keng & S.L.Chen) B.R.Baum, J.L.Yang & C.Yen
- Campeiostachys calcicola (Keng) Y.H.Zhou, H.Q.Zhang & M.Q.Deng
- Campeiostachys dahurica (Turcz. ex Griseb.) B.R.Baum, J.L.Yang & C.Yen
- Campeiostachys drobovii (Nevski) B.R.Baum, J.L.Yang & C.Yen
- Campeiostachys elongatiformis (Drobow) Sennikov
- Campeiostachys himalayana (Nevski) B.R.Baum, J.L.Yang & C.Yen
- Campeiostachys humidora (Ohwi & Sakam.) B.R.Baum, J.L.Yang & C.Yen
- Campeiostachys × mayebarana (Honda) B.R.Baum, J.L.Yang & C.Yen
- Campeiostachys nutans (Griseb.) B.R.Baum, J.L.Yang & C.Yen
- Campeiostachys purpurarista (C.P.Wang & X.L.Yang) Y.H.Zhou, H.Q.Zhang & Wei Huan Chen
- Campeiostachys schrenkiana (Fisch. & C.A.Mey. ex Schrenk) Drobow
- Campeiostachys tridentata (C.Yen & J.L.Yang) C.Yen, J.L.Yang & B.R.Baum
- Campeiostachys tsukushiensis (Honda) B.R.Baum, J.L.Yang & C.Yen
