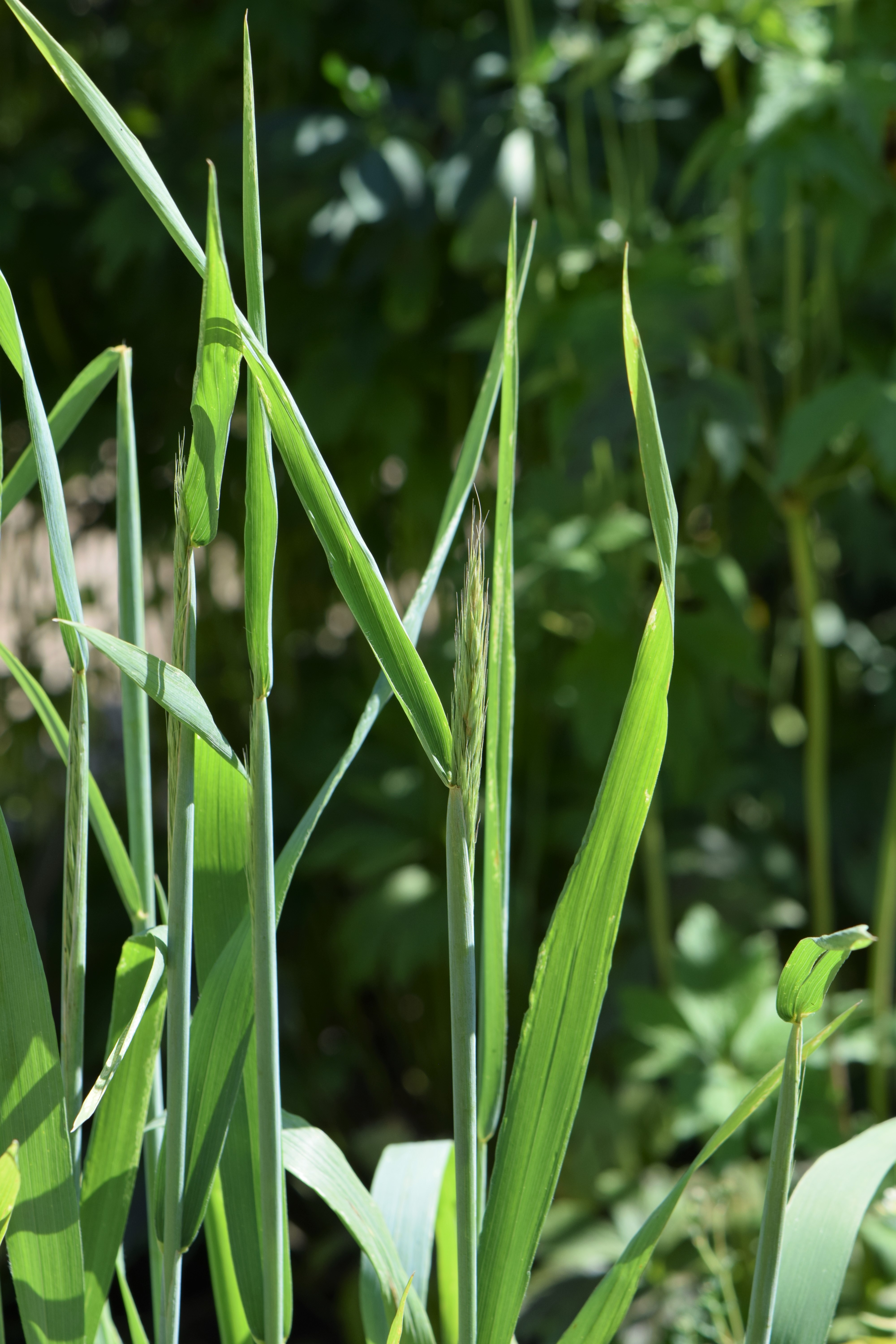

Scientific classification
- Kingdom: Plantae
- Clade: Embryophytes
- Clade: Tracheophytes
- Clade: Spermatophytes
- Clade: Angiosperms
- Clade: Monocots
- Clade: Commelinids
- Order: Poales
- Family: Poaceae
- Genus: Campeiostachys
- Species: C. dahurica

Binomial name
- Campeiostachys dahurica (Turcz. ex Griseb.) B.R.Baum, J.L.Yang & C.Yen

Synonyms
- Clinelymus dahuricus (Turcz. ex Griseb.) Nevski; Elymus dahuricus Turcz. ex Griseb.; Campeiostachys dahurica var. cylindrica (Franch.) B.R.Baum, J.L.Yang & C.Yen; Campeiostachys dahurica var. excelsa (Turcz. ex Griseb.) B.R.Baum, J.L.Yang & C.Yen; Campeiostachys dahurica var. pacifica (Prob.) J.L.Yang, C.Yen & B.R.Baum; Campeiostachys dahurica var. tangutorum (Nevski) B.R.Baum, J.L.Yang & C.Yen; Campeiostachys dahurica var. villosula (Ohwi) B.R.Baum, J.L.Yang & C.Yen; Clinelymus cylindricus (Franch.) Honda; Clinelymus excelsus (Turcz. ex Griseb.) Nevski; Clinelymus submuticus Keng; Clinelymus tangutorum Nevski; Clinelymus villosulus (Ohwi) Honda; Elymus beijingensis B.S.Sun; Elymus cylindricus Honda; Elymus dahuricus var. brevisetus Ohwi; Elymus dahuricus var. cylindricus Franch.; Elymus dahuricus subsp. cylindricus (Franch.) N.R.Cui; Elymus dahuricus var. cziticus Tzvelev; Elymus dahuricus var. excelsiformis Tzvelev; Elymus dahuricus var. excelsus (Turcz. ex Griseb.) Roshev.; Elymus dahuricus subsp. excelsus (Turcz. ex Griseb.) Tzvelev; Elymus dahuricus var. micranthus Melderis; Elymus dahuricus subsp. micranthus (Melderis) Á.Löve; Elymus dahuricus subsp. pacificus Prob.; Elymus dahuricus var. villosulus (Ohwi) Ohwi; Elymus dahuricus subsp. villosulus (Ohwi) Á.Löve; Elymus dahuricus var. violeus C.P.Wang & X.L.Yang; Elymus dahuricus var. xiningensis (L.B.Cai) S.L.Chen; Elymus excelsus Turcz. ex Griseb.; Elymus franchetii Kitag.; Elymus franchetii subsp. pacificus (Prob.) Peschkova; Elymus molliusculus L.B.Cai; Elymus osensis Ohwi; Elymus submuticus (Keng) Á.Löve; Elymus tangutorum (Nevski) Hand.-Mazz.; Elymus villifer C.P.Wang & X.L.Yang; Elymus villosulus Ohwi; Elymus woroschilowii Prob.; Elymus xiningensis L.B.Cai

= Campeiostachys dahurica =

Species of grass

Campeiostachys dahurica (also called Dahurian wildrye or asiatic wildrye) is a species of perennial herb and a member of the flowering plant family Poaceae.

The species is widespread in central and Eastern Asia. This species has been introduced in the Great plains of the United States and the prairie provinces in Canada. It has also been introduced to the Baltic states.

It has several subspecies and varieties.
