= Loess Plateau =

Plateau in northern China

Loess Plateau 黄土高原
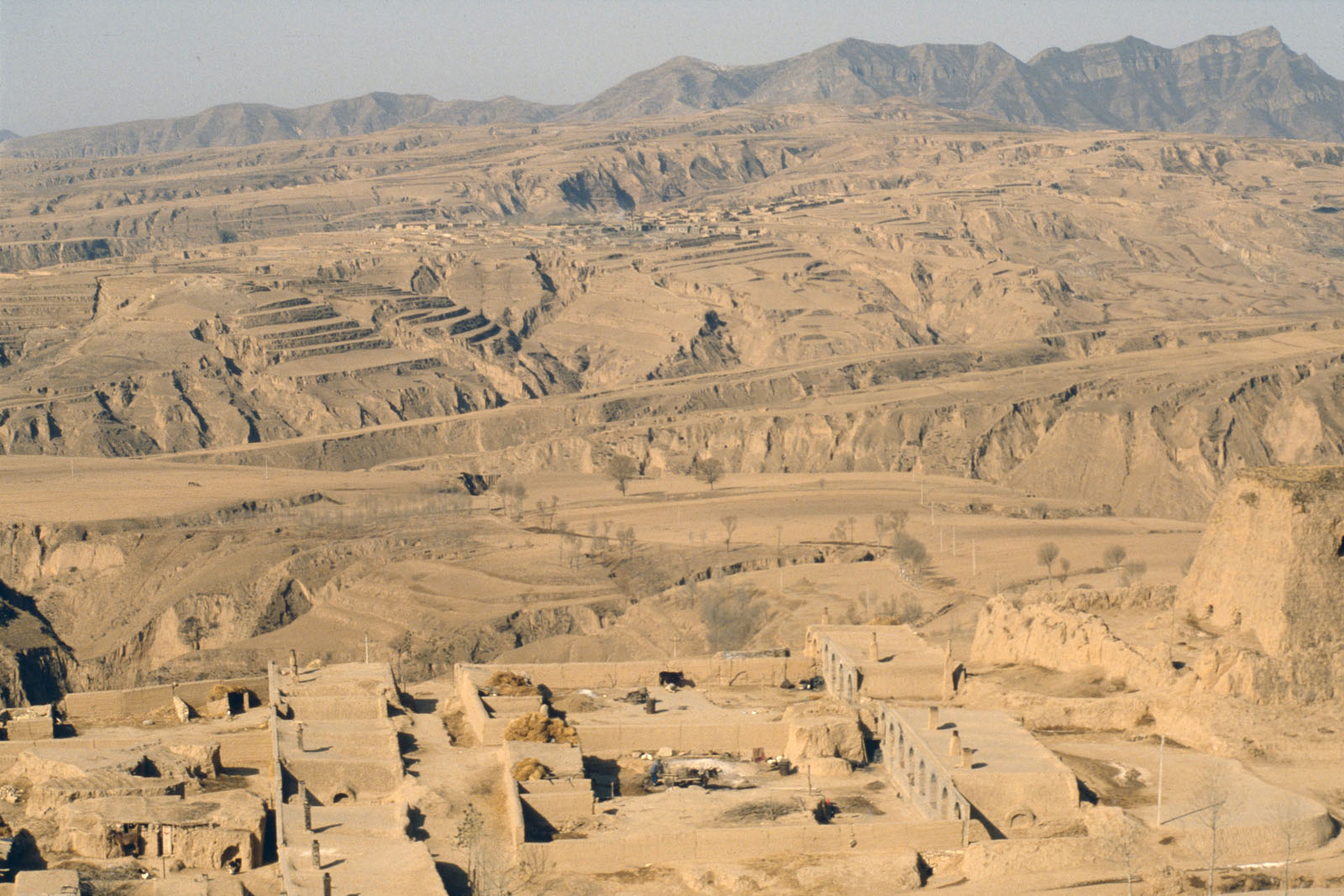
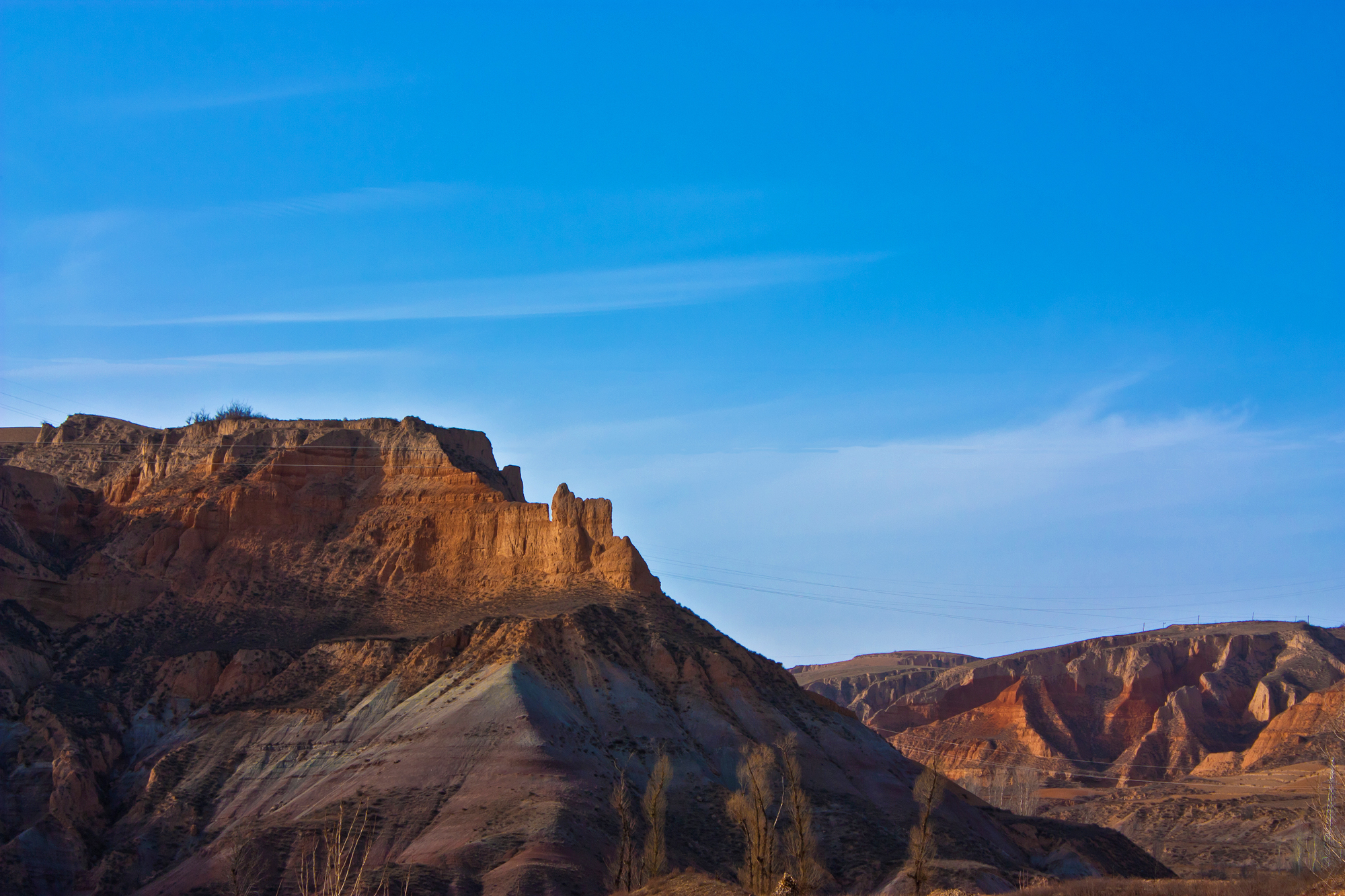
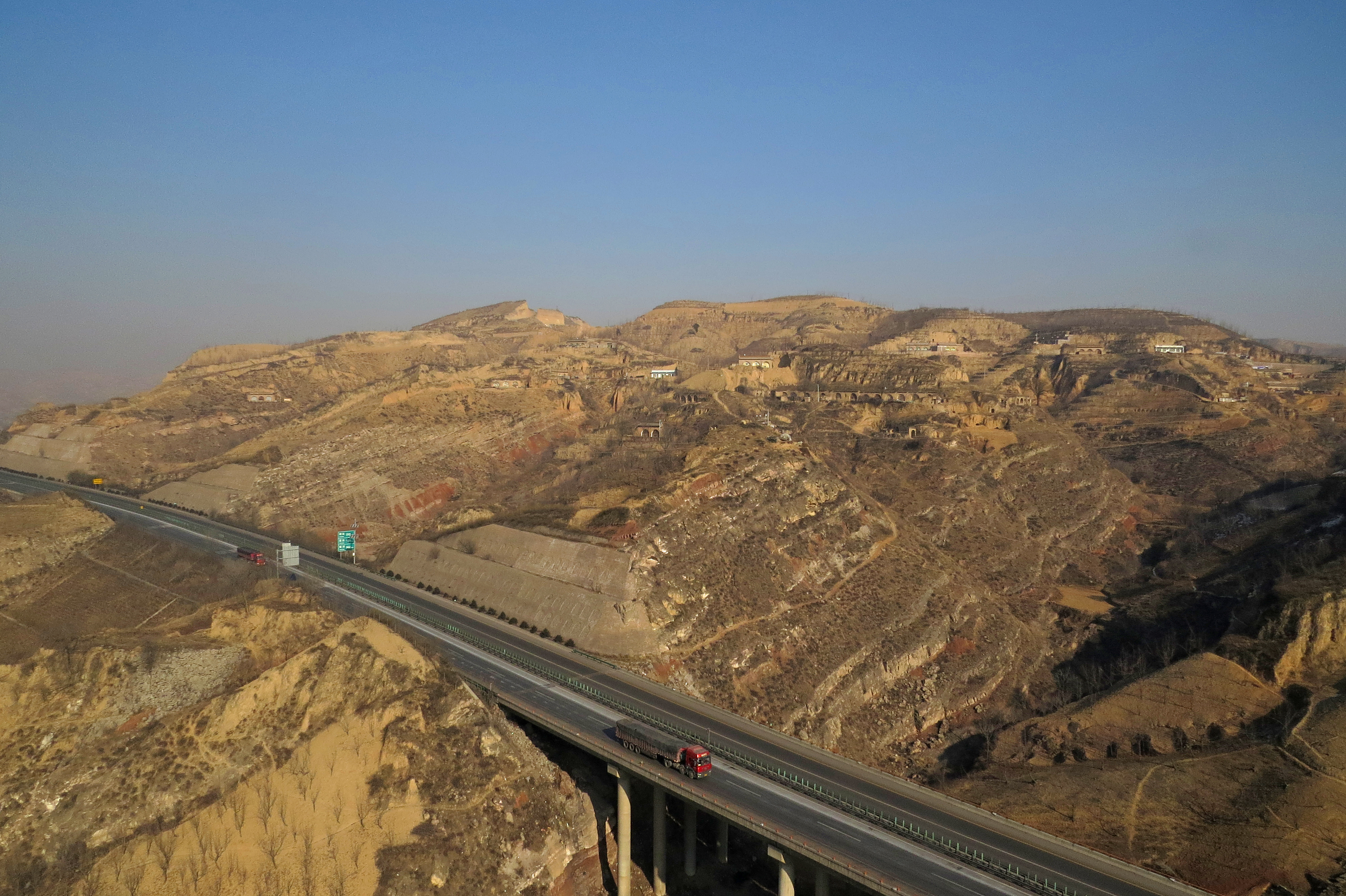
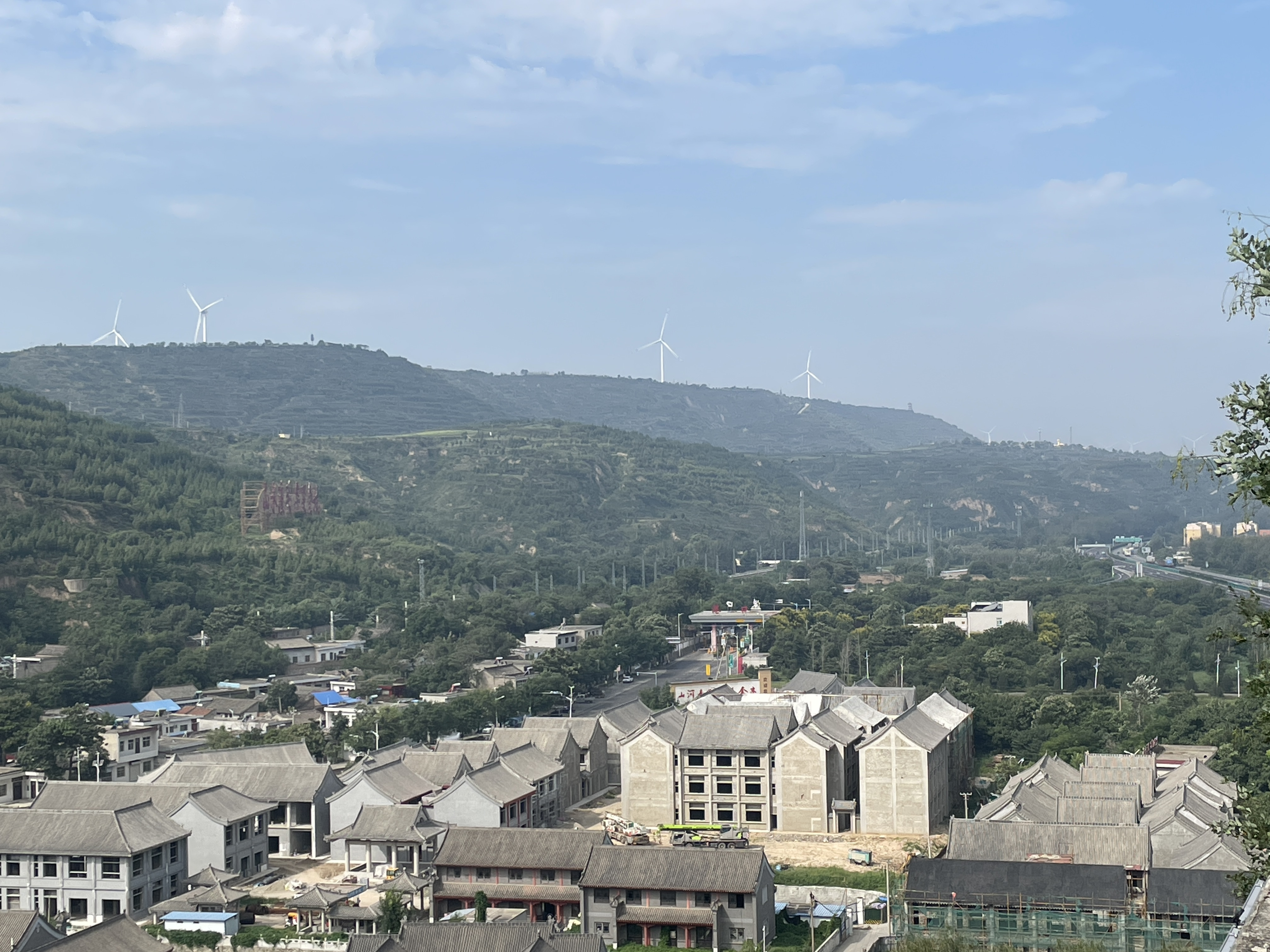
- Hunyuan, Shanxi in 1987 Loess Plateau in 2012 Renjia Mountain in 2015 Tongguan in 2023

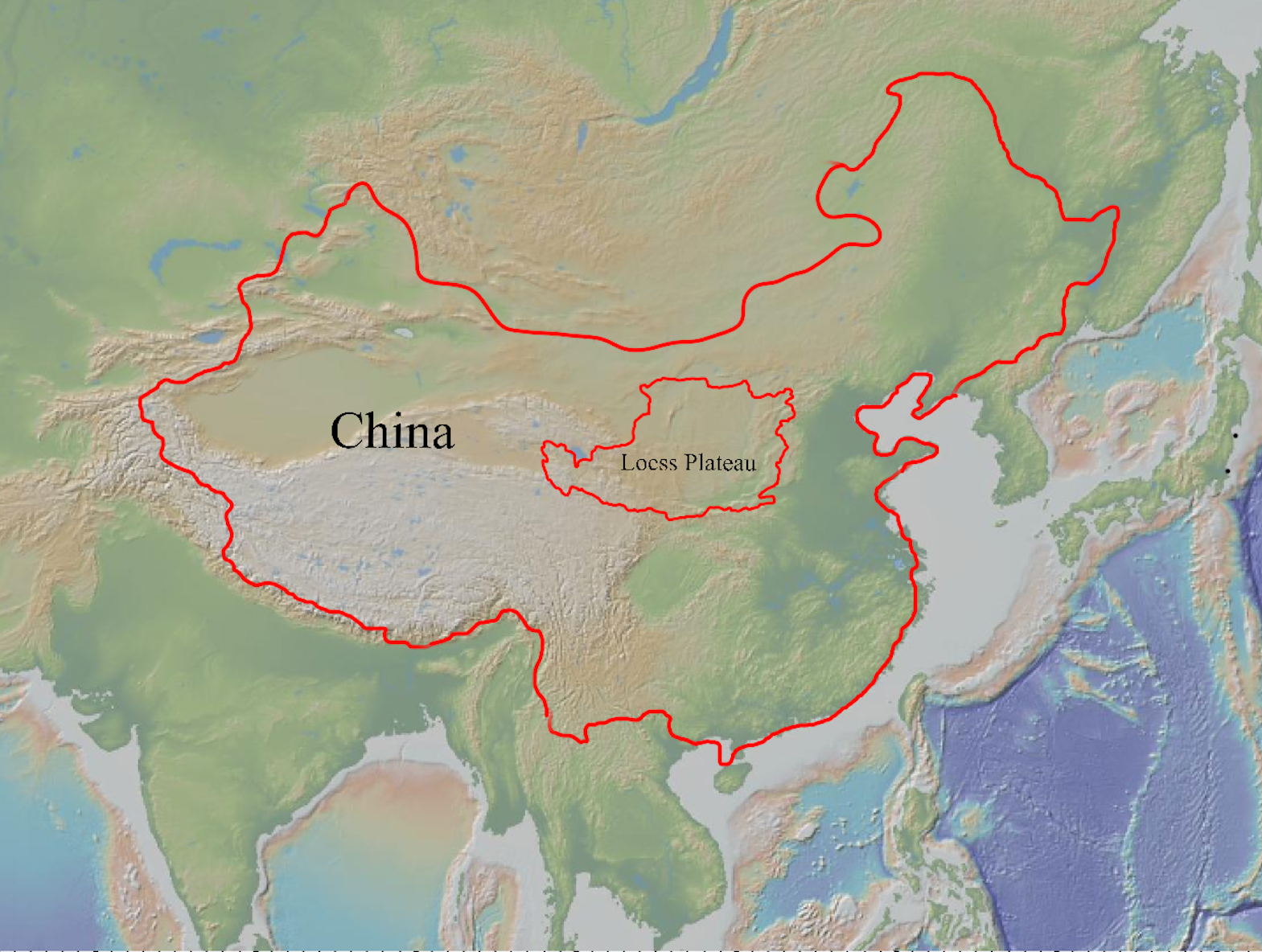

Area
  - Total: 635,000 km^{2} (245,000 sq mi)
- Elevation: 1,200 m (3,900 ft)

Population (2010)
  - Total: 108,000,000

Loess Plateau
- Traditional Chinese: 黃土高原
- Simplified Chinese: 黄土高原
- Literal meaning: "loess plateau" or "yellow-soil high plain"
Transcriptions
Standard Mandarin
- Hanyu Pinyin: Huángtǔ Gāoyuán
Yue: Cantonese
- Jyutping: Wong4-tou2 Gou1-jyun4

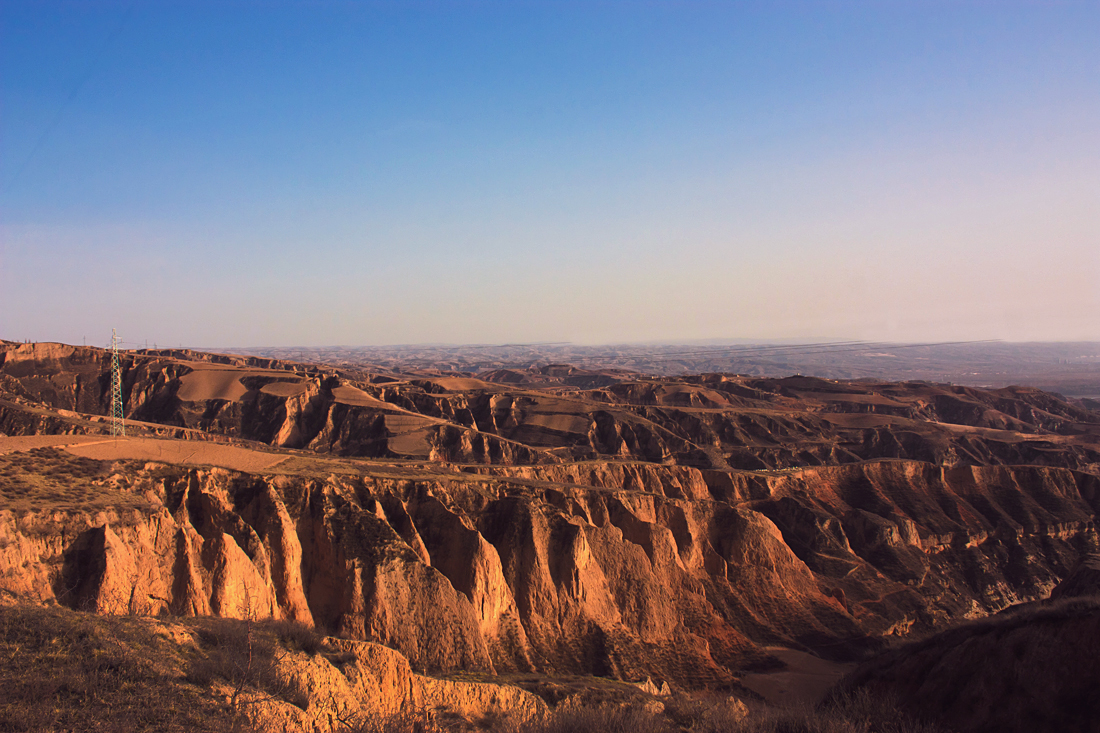
Geomorphology of the Loess Plateau

The Loess Plateau (Note: Chinese: 黄土高原; pinyin: Huángtǔ Gāoyuán) is a plateau in north-central China formed of loess, a clastic silt-like sediment formed by the accumulation of wind-blown dust. It is located southeast of the Gobi Desert and is surrounded by the Yellow River. It includes parts of the Chinese provinces of Qinghai, Gansu, Shaanxi and Shanxi. The depositional setting of the Chinese Loess Plateau was shaped by the tectonic movement in the Neogene period, after which strong southeast winds caused by the East Asian Monsoon transported sediment to the plateau during the Quaternary period. The three main morphological types in the Loess Plateau are loess platforms, ridges and hills, formed by the deposition and erosion of loess. Most of the loess comes from the Gobi Desert and other nearby deserts. The sediments were transported to the Loess Plateau during interglacial periods by southeasterly prevailing winds and winter monsoon winds. After the deposition of sediments on the plateau, they were gradually compacted to form loess under the arid climate.

The Loess Plateau is one of the largest and thickest loess plateaus in the world. Its 635,000-square-kilometre (245,000 mi^{2}) area corresponds to around 6.6% of the land area in China. Around 108 million people inhabit the Loess Plateau.

Because of the strong winds, erosion is also powerful across the plateau. Therefore, erosional features, including wind escarpments, loess vertical joints and gullies are present. In the past few decades, the environment and climate has changed, including the rainfall pattern, vegetation cover, and the natural hazards. These changes may relate to human development in the plateau; Chinese environmental officials are trying to find sustainable ways to manage the region.

== Geology ==
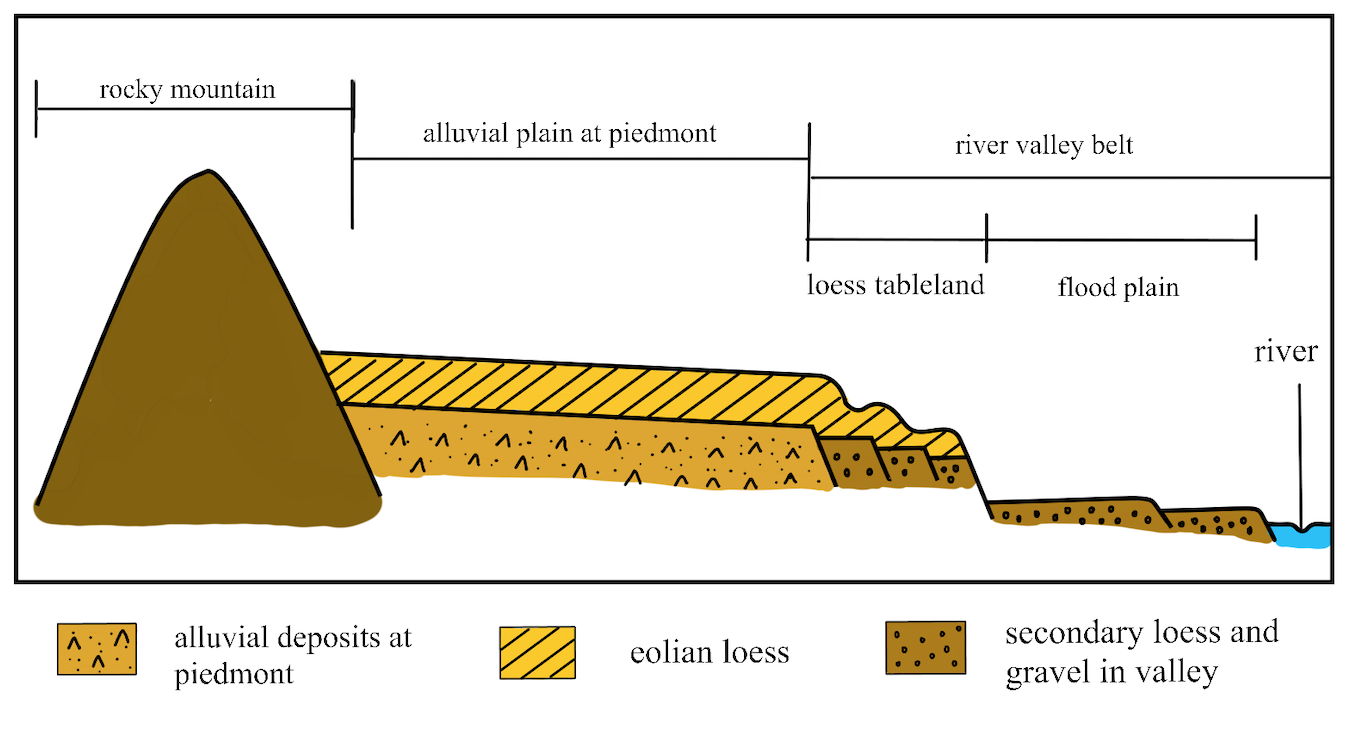
This figure shows the change in geomorphology in the Loess Plateau. Adapted from Dai et al.1992. The geomorphology of the Loess Plateau changes from rocky mountains to alluvial plains to river valley belt. This pattern keeps repeating from the Northwest to the Southeast of the Loess Plateau.

=== Geomorphology ===
There are three main types of morphology in the Loess Plateau. They are loess platform, loess ridges, and loess hills. Loess tableland is flat and with many loess strata. It is mostly located at south Loess Plateau. Loess ridges are formed by erosion and are located at the central Loess Plateau. Loess Hills are conical dunes and are located at the north Loess Plateau. The geomorphology of the Loess Plateau is formed by the erosion and deposition of loess.

In the Loess Plateau, the geomorphology usually changes from rocky mountains to Alluvial plain at piedmont to river valley belt. This pattern keeps repeating from the Northwest to the Southeast of the Loess Plateau.

The height of the rocky mountains is much higher than the loess deposit. The height and morphology of the mountains are different in different locations.

One of the highest mountains in the Loess Plateau is called Mahan Mountain. The elevation of this mountain is around 3,670 metres (12,040 ft), which is 1,300 metres (4,300 ft) higher than the loess line. It is a flat-topped mountain and has paleo-peneplain remnants on the mountain top.

Some of the mountain slopes, especially the windward slope (north slope), were forested in the past.

The alluvial plain at piedmont is composed of Alluvial fans which can be found in this area, and which are located at the foot of the rocky mountains.

The size of this belt depends on the amount of runoff and weathering materials from the rocky mountains.

Old alluvial fans are covered with eolian loess. Further from the rocky mountains, loess tableland and loess "Ping" can be found and even links with the next belt, which is the river valley belt.

The River valley belt includes flood plains, river terraces and river beds. The terraces with higher height are mostly covered with thick loess. It will change to another form of landscape, which is loess ridge, by strong erosion. If the erosion is weak, the higher terraces will change to loess tableland. These flat river basins, which include valley flat and lower terraces, are important for construction and agricultural activities.

==== Erosional features ====
===== Wind escarpment and bedrock ridges =====
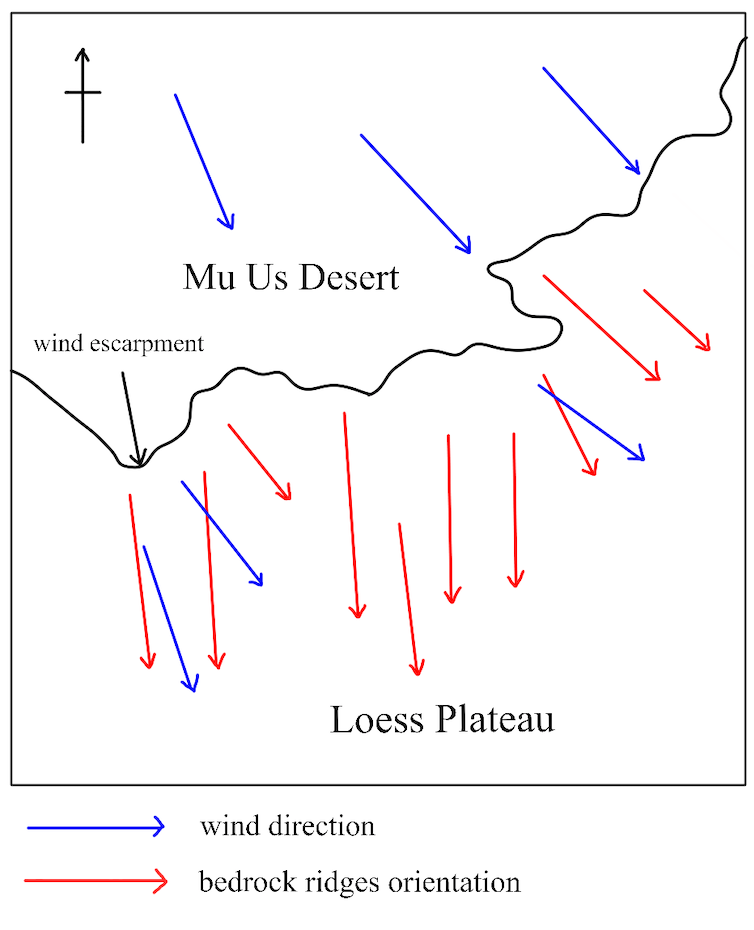
This figure shows the relationship between wind direction and orientation of the linear bedrock ridges. The orientation of the bedrock ridges is parallel to the wind direction. Also, the direction of the ridges slowly rotates to the North in the central Loess Plateau.

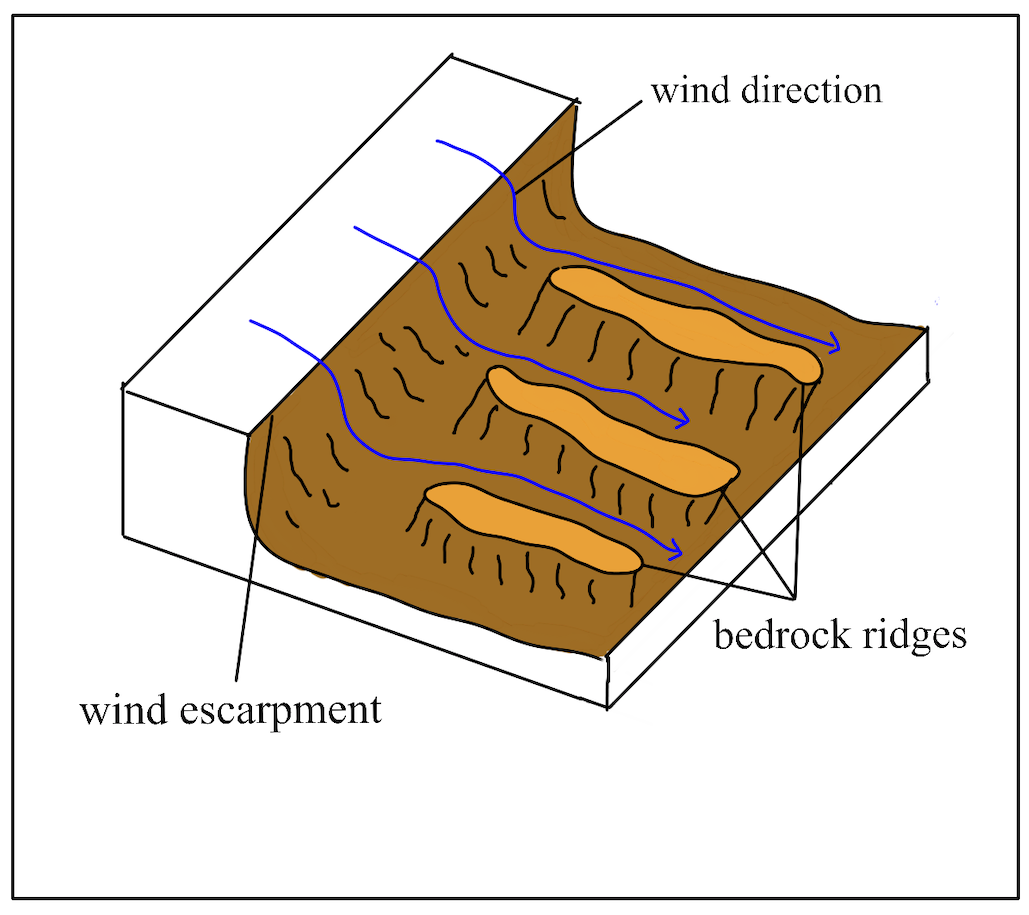
This is the 3D model of the wind escarpment and the bedrock ridges.

Mu Us Desert is located in the northwest of the Loess Plateau. Wind escarpment in the Loess Plateau marks a boundary between Mu Us Desert and the Loess Plateau. It also represents a transition from loess accumulation to wind erosion in the Loess Plateau. Many linear bedrock ridges are formed behind the wind escarpment, which are parallel to the wind direction. In the northern Loess Plateau, the bedrock ridges are pointing towards the northeast. However, the direction of the ridges slowly rotates to the North in the central Loess Plateau. At North Loess Plateau, the ridges are oriented 118° ±14° while they are oriented 179° ± 11° at central Loess Plateau. This indicates the role of wind erosion.

The monsoon wind direction in Quaternary is consistent with modern climatology. To observe near-surface wind vectors, they compared the wind in Quaternary and modern wind. The results show that the wind direction in winter and spring-storm events are the same as the orientation of the bedrock ridges. Therefore, modern windstorms also contribute to shaping the eolian geomorphology.

The Yellow River has provided sediments supply continuously which has been reworked by wind. Also, the wind erosion becomes stronger when it reaches the Loess Plateau wind escarpment. Because of the streamline compression of the wind escarpment, the wind speed is increased.

As a result, the Loess Plateau is not only a site of loess deposition but also a source of dust because of strong wind erosion. Wind erosion is very severe during the glacial period. During the glacial period, there is very little vegetation, so it favors wind erosion.

===== Vertical loess joints =====
Loess vertical joints distribution depends on the loess structure, water moisture, strata and microtopography. There are vertical development features and lateral development features.

====== Vertical development features ======
Vertically, joints can be found in different loess strata, including late, middle and early Pleistocene loess layers. It is one of the most significant structures of the Loess Plateau. The development and size of the vertical loess joints depend on the vegetation coverage and slope. Steep slope and poor vegetation coverage favor the development of the joints. Many vertical loess joints can be easily found on the vertical cliffs of tableland. The joints and the loess-paleosol interface are orientated perpendicularly. Also, in a dry loess layer, vertical loess joints are the wet part of it. Therefore, it is very difficult to notice the loess vertical joints in deep strata. The water from rainfall and irrigation will infiltrate into the loess strata through the vertical joint surface and pore concentration zone. The joint systems in the loess strata are of different sizes, properties, periods, and origins. Loess Vertical Joints distribute all over the loess plateau. The joints in landslides can be categorized by their different features.

The original joints are formed on the major scarp, minor scarp, original vertical cliffs and flanks. They are no displacement and closed.

Unloading vertical joints and weathering vertical joints are at the top and edge of the slope or landslides and mostly in open shape and with little displacement.

Sliding joints are in the body of landslides. Usually they are step-shaped and with large displacement.

Collapsible joints are formed when there is asymmetrical settlement during rainfall or irrigation. They are located far from the edge of tableland and with apparent displacement.

====== Lateral development features ======
The lateral development of the vertical loess joints can be divided into four stages.

In the development stage original vertical joints, unloading joints and weathering joints can be found. In this range, the joints are mainly weathering joints and unloading joints. Nothing fill in the joint surfaces.

In the micro-development stage, the distribution of the loess joints is sparser. The joints are filling with fine sand. This indicates the infiltration of water and accumulation of the sediments in the water.

In the underdevelopment stage a few or nearly zero joints are found.

And lastly in the undeveloped stage no vertical joint is found. The loess is very dry. The average moisture content is 16.22%.

===== Gullies =====
Gully erosion acts as an important source for sediments. If an area has gully erosion, it means that the area has serious land degradation. In the Loess Plateau, the contribution of gully erosion on total sediment production in the hilly areas is about 60% to 90%. It is serious in the Loess Plateau. To know the contribution of gully erosion, we can measure the gully volume changes.

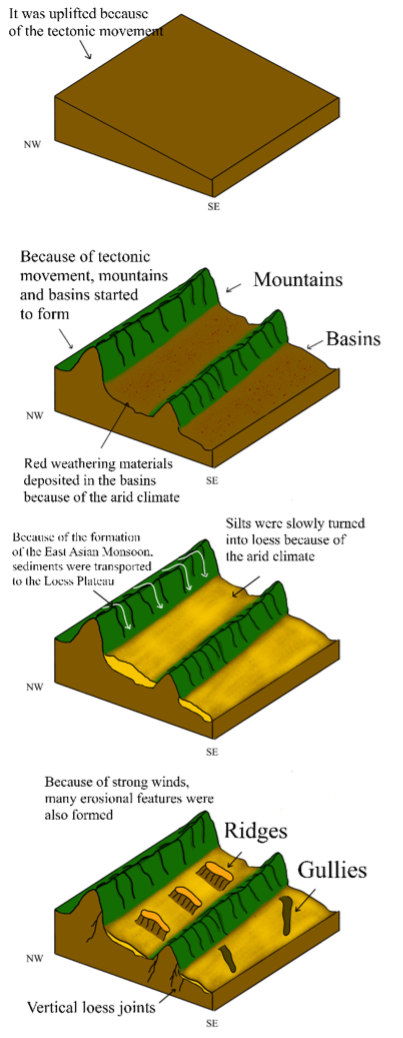
Because of the tectonic movement, the Loess Plateau was uplifted. Many mountains and basins were formed. Afterward, the East Asian Monsoon was formed, so the silt sediments were transported to the Loess Plateau. The silt slowly turned into loess because of the arid climate. Finally, since the winds are strong, many erosional features were formed.

There are three types of gullies in the Loess Plateau, including floor gullies, hill slope gullies and valley bank gullies.

=== Geological development ===
Development of the Loess Plateau over geological time
Age	Description
Early Cretaceous	The climate become hot and arid, and a red stratum was formed.
Late Cretaceous	The Yanshanian Movement happened which led to folding and faulting of the rock strata. Some of the rocks were uplifted and formed the mountains, such as Helan Mountain and Liupan Mountain. Some of the rocks experienced depression and formed river basins, such as the Heta Deposition Plain.
Early and middle Pliocene	Because of long duration denudation and planation, the area became a grand peneplain. Many intermontane basins were formed because of tectonic movements. The altitude of the mountains and basins was not high and did not have much difference in this period. Because of the arid climate, red weathering materials were formed. Therefore, red deposits could be found in the basins. The Hipparion fauna red bed from Pliocene is the foundation of the Loess Plateau.
Late Pliocene	Because continuous denudation and peneplaination started again. The water level in the basins, which consisted of Hipparion fauna red bed deposits, decreased gradually and even dried out.
Early Quaternary	There was active tectonic movement in the late Pliocene and early Quaternary. Because of the crustal movement and the cold climate, the sedimentary environments of loess started to form. Therefore, the deposition of loess started 2.4 Ma ago.
Quaternary	Because of the uplift of the Tibet Plateau, the East Asia monsoon started to form. After entering the Quaternary, the climate became arider. A large number of silt materials were formed by the physical weathering which became the source of loess in the Loess Plateau. The sediments were brought to the Loess Plateau through dust storms and monsoon winds. Because of the arid climate in the Loess Plate, the sediments slowly turned from silt sediments to loess.
Middle Pleistocene	Since erosion is also powerful across the Loess Plateau, many erosional features started to form, including gullies, vertical loess joints, and wind escarpments.
At present	The population in the Loess Plateau has increased rapidly. There are many agricultural activities. Intensive farming activities led to soil erosion, landslides, and debris flow. Also, because of the crustal uplifting, the loess platform and ridges which were depositional environments, turn into erosional environments.

In conclusion, the geomorphic outline of the Loess Plateau was shaped by the tectonic movement since Neogene. After that, because of the East Asia Monsoon in Quaternary, the loess and different erosional features started to form. However, because of human activities, many areas in the Loess Plateau turned into erosional environments.

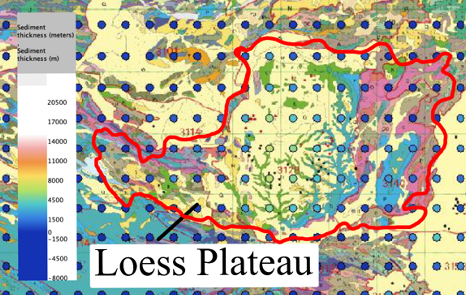
This map shows the geological development and sediments thickness in the Loess Plateau. The thickness of the loess is the thickest in the Loess Plateau than the loess in other areas in China. From the scale, you can see the respected thickness of the loess in different colors. Adapted from Geomap.

==== Loess deposits ====
===== Formation of loess =====
Loess does not necessarily mean the same as silt. Loess is yellow eolian sediments that were transported by wind from an arid or semi-arid region during the Quaternary period. Around 6% of the land in the world is covered with loess. Loess records the past climate and environment.

The Chinese Loess Plateau is one of the largest sinks of loess in the world. When the sediments are transported to the Loess Plateau, they are silt materials. After they deposit in arid areas and under strong chemical weathering and the process of carbonation, loess is formed. Two types of loess are defined by their formation process.

Typical loess is loess that is deposited during late Pleistocene and Holocene. It is formed under arid or semi-arid conditions.

Secondary loess is loess that is compacted by upper loess and does not experience the weathering and carbonation process. Also, it is formed by the transformation of fluvial and lake loess in semi-arid areas.

===== Distribution of loess =====
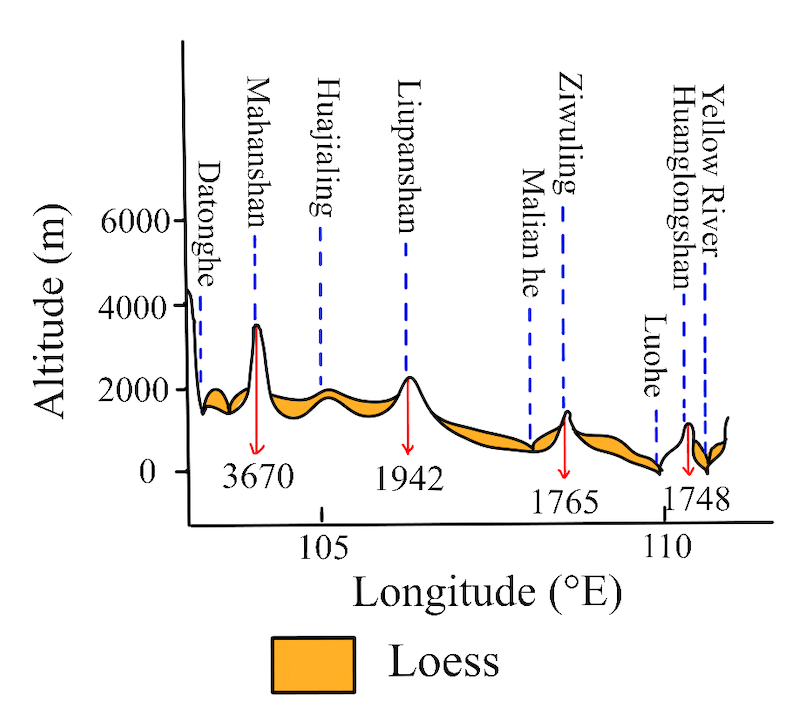
This figure shows the thickness and distribution of loess in the Loess Plateau. Adapted from Sun 2002. The loess near the Liupanshan is the thickest which is around 200 m to 300 m while the loess near the Yellow River is around 100 m thick.

Both the thickness and the size of loess decrease from northwest to southeast. The figure shows the topography of the Chinese Loess Plateau. The loess near the Liu-p'an Mts is the thickest which is around 200 to 300 metres (660 to 980 ft) while the loess near the Yellow River is around 100 metres (330 ft) thick. This is related to the sorting by wind. When the monsoon wind and dust storm are blown from the northwest, it carries the loess of different sizes. When it arrives at the Loess Plateau, the energy of the wind starts to decrease, so it drops the largest and heaviest loess first. It continues to move towards the southeast of the Loess Plateau, the energy of the wind keeps decreasing. Therefore, the finest loess materials are deposited at the southeast end of the Plateau. That is why the coarsest loess is at the northwest of the Loess Plateau while the finest is at the southeast.

Some studies found that the loess that formed during Middle Pleistocene is expansive and thick. Therefore, the main period for the formation of the Loess Plateau is Middle Pleistocene. Most of the loess in the west of Liupan Mountain is yellow. However, the loess in the east has many different colors, such as deep reddish-orange, brownish-gold. The color differences indicate that Liupan Mountain was formed before the loess deposition and it caused the different properties of the loess in different sides of the mountain.

===== Sedimentation of loess =====
Most of the loess is deposited and well preserved at "Yuans", which are very flat. Some studies found that the apparent sedimentation rate, which determines the changes of the rate of deposition, has similar changes as the grain size changes. When the grain size increases, the apparent sedimentation rate also increases. There are two reasons.

There are other factors that control the grain size changes. Besides the variations in the wind intensity, the grain size may also affect by the aridity of the source areas. This changes the transporting distance of the sediments. During interglacial periods, the Loess Plateau retreated northwesterly while it moves towards the southeast during glacial periods. Therefore, the distance between the source areas and the Loess Plateau changes a lot. The grain size will increase in some northwest areas during glacial periods, even though the wind intensity does not change.

This may also be associated with the transporting winds. During glacial periods, the Siberian High is enhanced, and the winter monsoon become drier and stronger. Therefore, the amount and grain size of the sediments will increase.

===== Mineralogy of loess =====
More than 90% of the loess is calcite, feldspar, mica and quartz. Among that, around 50% is quartz. The 10% left are orthoclase, viitaniemiite, sudoite, clinochlore and nimite.

From the mineralogical, isotopic, and chemical results, it is easy to find the provenance of the loess.

==== Provenance of loess deposits ====
===== Sources =====
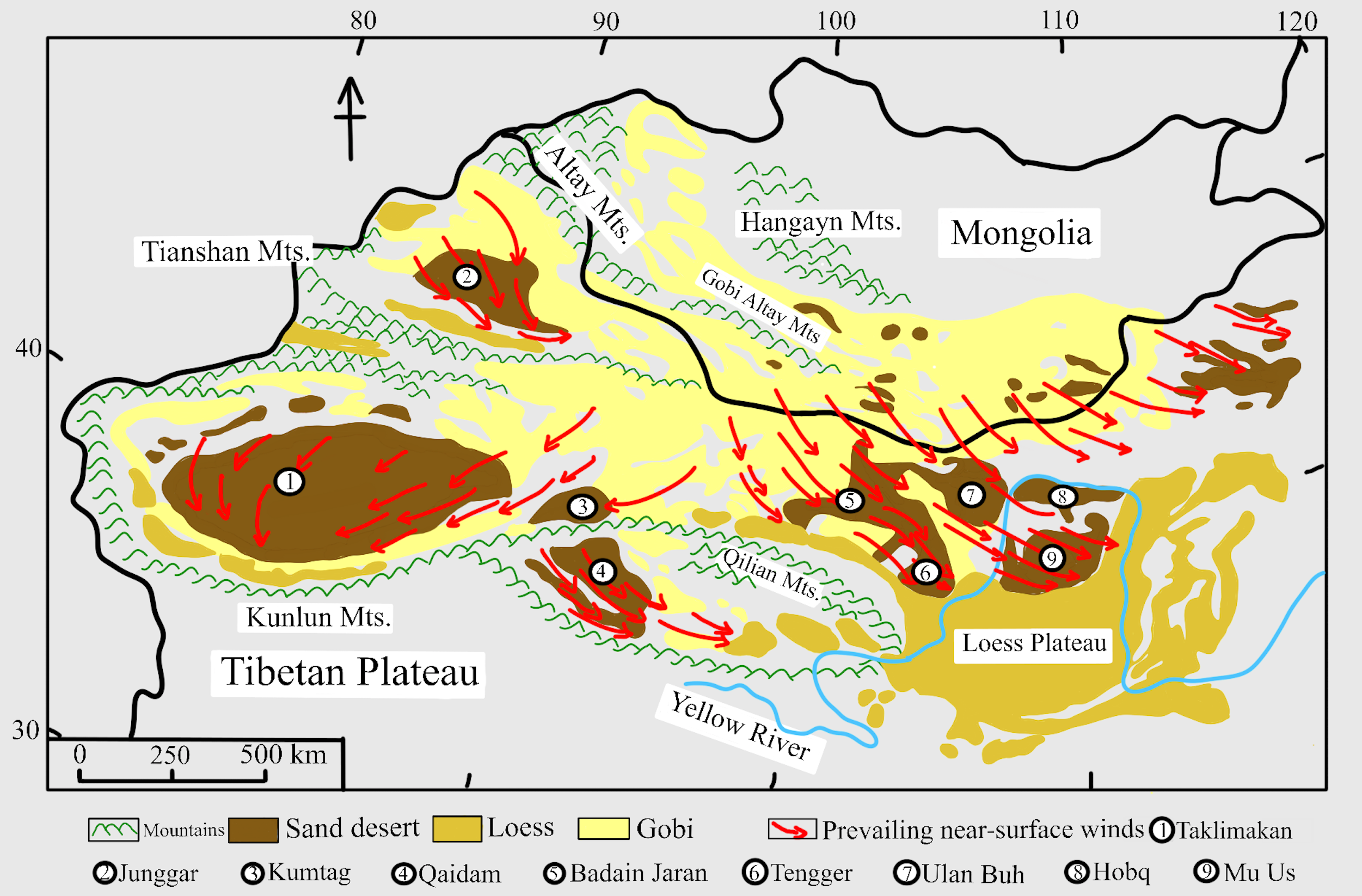
This map shows the distribution of loess with the locations of basins and mountains. Adapted from Sun 2002. Also, the direction of the prevailing winds is shown. It shows how and where the loess is transported The sources of loess are the Gobi Desert and the deserts nearby. However, the loess in the desert comes from the Gobi Altay Mts, the Hangayn Mts, and the Qilian Mts.

The sources of loess in the Chinese Loess Plateau are the Gobi Desert and the deserts nearby, including the Tengger Desert, Badain Jaran Desert, Ulan Buh Desert, Mu Us Desert and Hobq Desert. However, the main source is the Gobi Desert. This is proven because their minerals, isotopes and chemicals are similar. Both of the places have quartz as the main mineral of the loess. The value of ^{87}Sr/^{86}Sr is extremely high and both of them have high Eu/Yb and Eu/Eu ratios, which are trace elements. These data prove that the loess is from the Gobi Desert. The Gobi Desert is located at the north of the plateau. Although the distance between the Gobi Desert and the Chinese Loess Plateau is quite far, it is possible that the loess can travel such a great distance. There are a few reasons why the source of loess is from the Gobi Desert and the sand deserts.

Prevailing wind: The prevailing wind of the sand deserts and Gobi Desert are from the northwest. Since the Gobi Desert and the sand deserts are located northwest of the Chinese Loess Plateau, the prevailing wind builds a linkage for all these places. The loess can travel to the plateau through the prevailing wind.

No mountain in between: In the transport pathway of the dust, there is no high mountain in between. In the situation where high mountains block the dust when the dust is transporting, the dust may deposit at the windward slope of the mountain.

Monsoon is also important to determine the source of loess because monsoon will affect the wind direction. There are winter monsoonal winds flowing from Mongolia because of the high-pressure cell in Siberian-Mongolia. This plays an important role in transporting dust and loess to the Loess Plateau.

Dust storm: This is the most important factor. During Spring, many strong dust storms happen in the Loess Plateau which usually last for more than two days. With a longer dust storm event, the loess can travel a longer distance. The dust storm is blown from northwest to the Loess Plateau.

===== Origin of the loess =====
Although the source of loess materials is from the Gobi Desert and the sand deserts, they are not produced by those deserts. The three mountains, including the Gobi Altay Mountains, the Hangayn Mountains and the Qilian Mountains are responsible for making loess materials for the desert and plateau.

High elevation: According to the environmental lapse rate, the air temperature will decrease by 6 °C (11 °F) per 1,000 metres (3,300 ft). Therefore, the higher the mountain, the more extreme climate. All three mountains are higher than 2,500 metres (8,200 ft), ranging from 2,500 to 5,500 metres (8,200 to 18,000 ft). The mountain top may have a temperature of 0 °C (32 °F) or lower. This favors the frost weathering process and freeze-thaw cycles which lead to physical weathering of the rocks at the mountain top. This process changes the rocks into small sized grains.

High relief and gradient: When the melting water and river water from the mountain water flows down from the mountain top, it creates a large amount of potential energy because of the slope gradient and high relief. When the water flows through the valleys and unstable rocky slopes, many clastic materials are washed away by the water. The removed materials are transported by the water and deposited in mountain foot and lowland basins. This may even form alluvial fans. There is a huge alluvial fan at the mountain foot of the Gobi Altay Mts. Therefore, the sediments and sands of the desert are from the mountain. After that, the wind will transport the sediments to the Loess Plateau and sort the sediments.

Tectonic activities: When there are tectonic activities in High Asia, energy is released. This causes the denudation of the rock and downcutting of rivers of the mountains. Loess materials are formed from the mountains during tectonic activities. Besides, the sediments are also produced by the eolian abrasion process in the deserts and the Yellow River. However, these are not the major sources of loess.

Therefore, the loess in the Chinese Loess Plateau is mainly produced by the three mountain ranges and deposited in the deserts. Through monsoon wind and dust storms, the loess is transported to the Loess Plateau.

== Climate and environment ==
=== Climate and environmental changes ===
	Changes	Effects	Cause of the changes
Climate	Change from cool and dry to humid.; Northern part of the Loess Plateau is semi arid.; Southern part of the Loess Plateau is sub-humid.	Does not favor the growth of vegetation, accelerates soil erosion.; Climate change leads to more extreme weather events for the past 2000 years, especially for the past 600 years.; There is more flood and drought.	Natural variations.
Precipitation	Decrease in annual precipitation.; Uniform distribution of precipitation: 40-60% of the precipitation concentrate in June to August.	Since the weather is dry, the frequency and strength of the dust storm events increase.; This leads to severe soil erosion.	Natural factors: Climate change and the change in the seasonality of the East Asian Monsoon.
Vegetation cover	Vegetation cover reduced by around 45%.	Soil moisture is decreased because of less infiltration.; This accelerates soil erosion. More than 90% of the sediments in the Yellow River come from the Loess Plateau.	Natural factors: soil erosion become more serious because of the development of hills and gullies. Also, climate change does not favor the growth of vegetation.; Human factors: because of the population growth, the demand for food has increased. People clear forests for agricultural activities.

The population of the Loess Plateau has been increasing since the 1600s. In 2000, the population has increased to 104 million. The rapid population growth has brought some environmental problems to Loess Plateau. For instance, deforestation. People clear the forest to get more land for agriculture activities and use the wood for fuel and building materials. This is the reason why the forest cover has decreased dramatically. There are more and more abnormal and extreme natural hazards in the Loess Plateau. This may be related to the climate and environmental changes.

=== Natural hazards ===
Different natural hazards connected with the Loess Plateau include dust storms, floods and droughts, locust swarms and landslides.

The number of dust storm events is increasing and they have become stronger. The materials can be carried by the dust storm for a very long distance. It affects Korea, Japan, and even the European Alps. The impacts of dust storms can be very huge. Dust storms can bury gigantic farmlands and affect the human respiratory system. They will also cause the death of livestock and humans.

The frequency of floods and droughts is closely related. This is because the increase in drought indicates that the weather has become more extreme. The number of floods will also increase. The frequency of floods and droughts is increasing abnormally.

The Loess Plateau becomes more vulnerable to locust swarms because the climate becomes cooler and more humid. They will destroy the farmland and reduce crop yield.

From 1965 to 1979, more than 1000 landslides that happened in the Loess Plateau were triggered by earthquake shocks and monsoonal summer rainfall.

== Sustainable development ==
=== Background ===
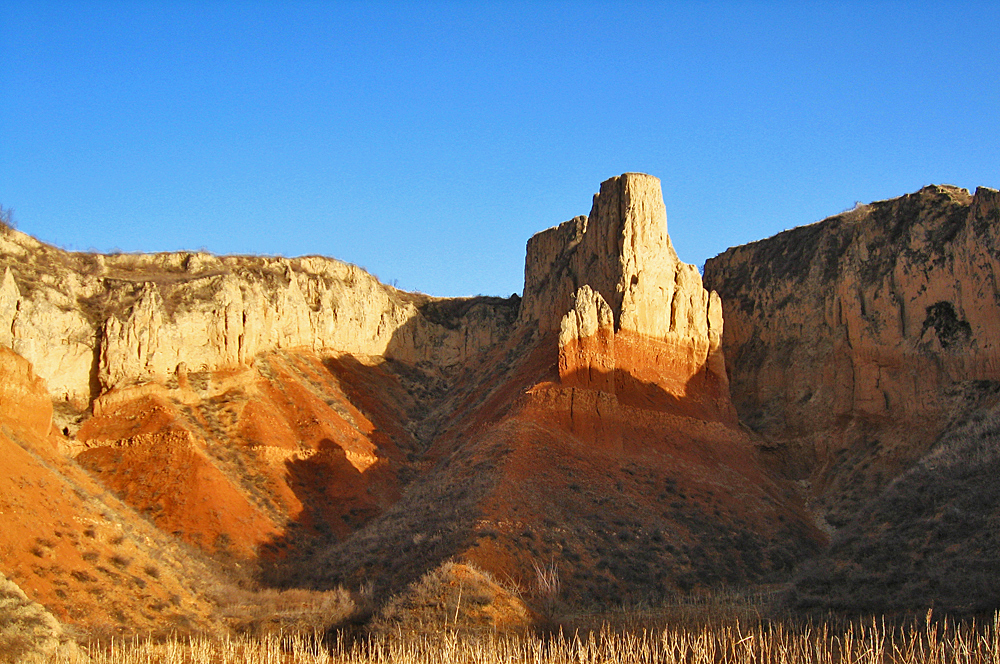
Loess Plateau in 2010

The Loess Plateau suffers from one of the world's most severe soil erosion. Soil erosion in the region is affected by many factors, including vegetation cover, precipitation, strength of winds, climate etc. However, human activities contribute the most to soil erosion in the Loess Plateau in recent years. It is estimated from historical records that forest cover on the Loess Plateau declined by a factor of eight during the last three millennia, reaching a low in 1949 leading to yearly soil erosion of 3700 tons of soil per km^{2}. Especially the northern and eastern parts of the region were once covered in forests.

The population in the Chinese Loess Plateau has tripled from 1949 to 2000, reaching 104 million people in 2000. More than 70% of slope land is used for agricultural activities. The farming activities on the steep slopes exposed the loess materials on the slope. When there is heavy rainfall and storms, the loess are easily washed away, which causes serious soil erosion. In 1999 it was found that most of the grassland is overgrazed and facing land degradation problems. Mining and construction also contribute to causing soil erosion.

=== Restoration projects ===
To promote sustainable farming and soil conservation strategies in the Loess Plateau, reforestation efforts were started during the 1960s. In 1999, the institute of soil and water conservation promoted a principle for conservational eco-agricultural construction. There are four main strategies:

- Restore vegetation, including grass and shrubs.
- Build essential grain cropland, such as terracing.
- Plant more cash crops and trees.
- Animal husbandry.

The conservation and sustainable construction is divided into three stages:

Timeline of ecosystem restoration effort
Stages	Description
Initial restoration	This stage is mainly to manage the land use and restore the cropland on steep slopes to woodland and pasture. They primarily focus on ecological development instead of economic benefits.
Stable improvement	This stage aims to increase the profits of pastures and cash crops, and also the input for agricultural activities. Also, they try to encourage the farmers to apply conservation practices by changing their traditional customs. After the promotion of conservation practices, the farmers in the Loess Plateau start to realize the importance of conserving the soil.
Final development	In this stage, most of the strategies are well-developed. Farmers have changed their traditional methods of growing crops. More and more farmers realize that protecting the environment is important and they are willing to learn conservation. As a result, it reduces soil erosion by 70%, and the income of the farmers also increased 8-fold.

In 1999, the Chinese government launched the Grain for Green restoration project, backed by the World Bank and the United Nations, piloted at the Loess Plateau. The project banned hillside cropping and free grazing; farmers receive grain-and-cash subsidies to convert fields to grassland or forest. In the early 2000s, grain yields dipped, inciting debates over food security. The government later tweaked the scheme, and yields later recovered. The first Loess Plateau restoration project cost US$252 million, as of 2007.

From 1975 to 2015, restoration projects in the Beiluo River Basin, southwestern part of the Loess Plateau, restored cropland into grassland and forest, boosting forest cover by about 18% and raising the basin's overall ecosystem service value by roughly 54% (about US$3.2 billion). From the program beginning to 2020, the Jinghe River watershed area observed reclaimed forest and grassland on the hills, which improved soil and water conservation and ecosystem services. Overall, it is estimated that forest cover increased by 15,000 km^{2} from 2007 to 2017 on the plateau.

A 2026 study of watersheds in the middle reaches of the Yellow River examined how soil and water conservation measures have changed runoff and sediment transport on the Loess Plateau. For flood events with comparable rainfall depths, mean runoff after 2000 was approximately 69% lower than before 1980, while sediment transport per event declined by about 87%. The researchers estimated that conservation measures reduced sediment yield by approximately 70%, although increasingly intense rainfall events continued to pose erosion risks. The study also found diminishing returns from further conservation measures, highlighting the challenges of managing sediment under changing rainfall conditions.

Between 2000 and 2024, the Loess Plateau changed to a warming, slightly wetter climate.
