= Tarvagatai Nuruu National Park =

National park in Zavkhan, Mongolia

- Mongolian: Тарвагатай Нуруу
- IUCN category II (national park)
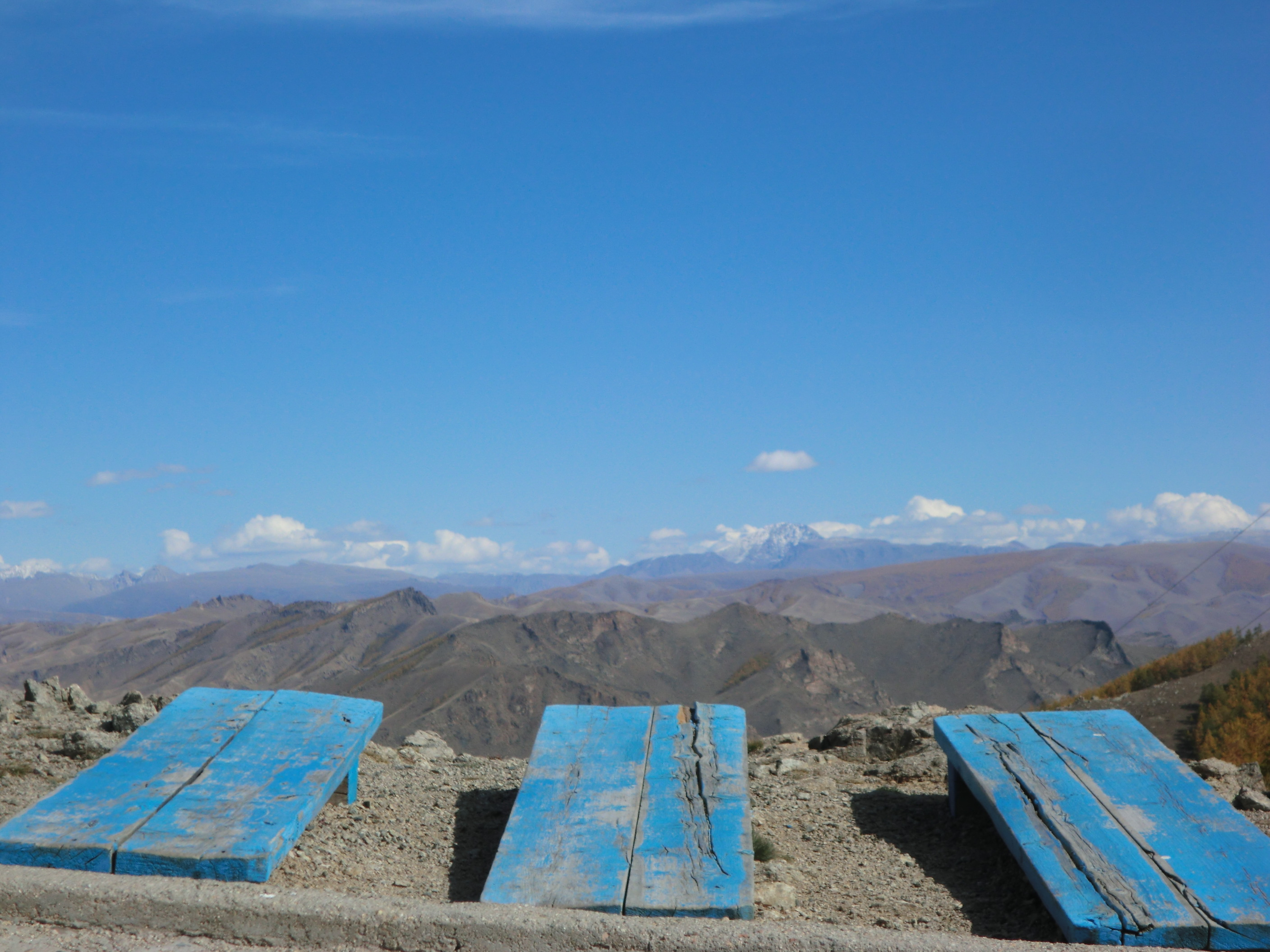
- Tarvagatay Range in the park, to the left of Mt Otgontenger in the distance

- Location within Mongolia
- Location: Mongolia
- Nearest city: Uliastai, Zavkhan Province
- Coordinates: 48°N 97.5°E
- Area: 5,467 square kilometres (2,111 sq mi)
- Established: 2000
- Governing body: Ministry of Environment and Green Development of Mongolia

Tarvagatai Nuruu National Park (Mongolian: Тарвагатай Нуруу) covers the southwestern sector of the Tarvagatai Range of the Khangai Mountains in Zavkhan Province, Mongolia. The park is remote, protecting a transition zone between semi-arid steppe to the south and coniferous forests on the northern slope of the range. A large fire burned a significant part of the park in 2002, including 800 square kilometres (310 mi^{2}) of forest, mostly larch and siberian pine. The park is located about 60 km northeast of Uliastai, in the eastern region of Zavkhan Province.

== Topography ==
The park stretches in a northeastern direction for 100 km from the northern base of Otgontenger, the highest mountain in the Khangai Mountains. The terrain is mountainous, with an average elevation of 2,200 to 3,200 meters. The ridges are relatively flat on top, with steep southern slopes and wide, glacially formed valleys.

== Climate and ecoregion ==
The climate of the area is Cold semi-arid climate (Köppen climate classification (BSk)). This climate is characteristic of steppe climates intermediary between desert humid climates, and typically have precipitation is above evapotranspiration. At least one month averages below 0 °C (32 °F).

== Flora and fauna ==
Biodiversity in the park is high due to the different floral zones. Altitude zones that rise from grassland in the valleys through forested northern slopes to alpine tundra at the highest elevations. Climatic zones also differ based on the aspect of slopes, their varying exposure to wind, sun and evaporation, and the varying areas of glacial and volcanic terrain. The southern-facing steppe areas are about 70% covered with grasses - Alpine oatgrass (Helictotrichon, Hawkweed (Hieracium), Tundra fescue (Festuca) and others, and sedges such as Wide-leaf low sedge (Carex pediformis). The trees in the forested areas are mostly Larch (Larix sibirica) and Siberian pine (Pinus sibirica).

== See also ==
- List of national parks of Mongolia
