= Grain for Green =

Chinese forestation project

China initiated its "Grain for Green" program in 1999 as an ambitious conservation program designed to mitigate and prevent flooding and soil erosion. It is an example of payment for ecosystem services which is helping to solve environmental issues in China. The program is designed to retire farmland that is susceptible to soil erosion, although some farmers may go back to farming the land after the program ends. China started the Grain for Green program in the western parts of the country for example Shanxi Province. These areas were known for their rather poorly performing economy that was affiliated with an endangered ecological environment. The environment was being further damaged by soil erosion which was a result of cultivation on sloping land as people were changing forests into farmland.

Grain for Green has involved 124 million people in 1,897 counties in 25 provinces. The program was set to end 8 years after it initially began, but was extended for another 8 years in 2007. By 2010, around 15 million hectares of farmland and 17 million hectares of barren mountainous wasteland were converted back to natural vegetation.

The programme has generally been economically positive for most areas involved, and initial concerns about income inequality and corruption were abated. Specifically, research found that the income status of households was not a determining factor in inclusion in Grain for Green. The programme has also generally addressed the environmental problems it set out to deal with, including soil erosion and flooding. Nevertheless, in many locations it has failed to deliver benefits for biodiversity on the land it has converted – many tree plantations were monocultures which were cheap to plant and easy for the farmers to maintain. Research has found that with minimal extra cost, Grain for Green can promote biodiversity by planting mixed forests.

== See also ==
- Afforestation
- Great Green Wall (China)
- Asian dust
- Deforestation
- Dust storm
