= Jiǎng (surname) =

Jiang and Chiang (simplified Chinese: 蒋; traditional Chinese: 蔣) are a Chinese surname. It is also sometimes romanized as Tsiang.

In 2019, it was the 39th most common surname in mainland China. It is listed 13th in the Hundred Family Surnames poem.

== Origins ==
- In the Jiang (state) and Zheng (state), when feudal lords were given the surname Jiang during the Zhou dynasty
- The Zhuang people were given the surname Jiang (蔣) during the Zhou dynasty
- The Miao people, Tujia people, Lahu people, and Yao people use the surname Jiang (蔣)
- The Mongolian people received the surname Jiang during the Yuan dynasty

== Chiang political family ==
- Chiang Kai-shek, President of the Republic of China, Director General of the Kuomintang
- Chiang Ching-kuo, President of the Republic of China, Chairman of the Kuomintang
- Chiang Fang-liang, Faina Chiang Fang-liang ( 蔣方良; 1916 – 2004) the wife of President Chiang Ching-kuo
- Chiang Hsiao-yen (蔣孝嚴; born 1942) or John Chiang, formerly surnamed Chang (章; Zhāng), Taiwanese politician
  - Chiang Wan-an 蔣萬安; pinyin: Jiǎng Wàn'ān); born 1978 or Wayne Chiang, formerly surnamed Chang (章; Zhāng), Taiwanese politician
- Chiang Wei-kuo, adopted son of Chiang Kai-shek and Republic of China politician

== Notable people ==
- Chiang Wei-shui, Taiwanese colonial resistance movement advocate
- Jiang Bingzhi, author better known as Ding Ling
- Jiang Menglin, Chinese educator
- Jiang Tingxi, painter
- Jiang Wan, Shu Han official
- Jiang Ying (musician) (1919–2012), Chinese singer
- Hong Jiang, American engineer
- Tihao Chiang, Taiwanese engineer
- Jiang Yanyong (October 4, 1931 — March 11, 2023) is a Chinese physician who publicized a coverup of the severe acute respiratory syndrome (SARS) epidemic in China
- Jiang Chaoliang (蒋超良; born 1957) is a Chinese politician and investor
- Jiang Jinfu (蒋劲夫; born 1991) is a Chinese actor and model
- Jiang Xin (蒋欣; born 1983), also known by her English name Rulu Jiang, is a Chinese actress
- Jiang Qinqin (蒋勤勤; born 1975) is a Chinese actress. She is sometimes credited as Shui Ling
- Jiang Wenli (Chinese: 蒋雯丽, born 1969) is a Chinese actress, director, producer, and screenwriter. A native of Tianjin.
- Jiang Mengjie (Chinese: 蒋梦婕, born 1989) is a Chinese actress. She is best known for her role as Lin Daiyu in 2010 television series
- Jiang Ying (musician) ( 蒋英; 1919 – 2012) was a Chinese opera singer and music teacher
- Jiang Dawei (born 1947) is a Chinese folk singer, best known for a number of hit songs such as the theme song for the 1986 TV series Journey
- Jiang Fangzhou (simplified Chinese: 蒋方舟; traditional Chinese: 蔣方舟; pinyin: Jiǎng Fāngzhōu; born October 27, 1989, in the city of Xiangyang, in Hubei province)
- Jiang Gan, a debater and scholar who lived during the late Eastern Han dynasty of China
- Jiang Qin
- Jiang Biwei (Chinese: 蔣碧薇; 1899 – 1978) was influential in the lives of the painter Xu Beihong and the politician
- Jiang Qing (Confucian) (蒋庆; born 1953) is a contemporary Chinese Confucian.
- Jiang Yanjiao (蒋燕皎; born 1986), is a Chinese badminton player from Changzhou
- Jiang Menglin (蒋梦麟; 1886 – 1964), also known as Chiang Monlin, was a Chinese educator, writer
- Jiang Ji
- Jiang Ziwen (蔣子文;) was a wei of Moling (modern Nanjing) county in China during the Eastern Han
- Jiang Dingwen (蒋鼎文; 1895–1974), courtesy name Mingsan (銘三)
- Tsiang Tingfu (蔣廷黻; 1895 – 1965), was a historian and diplomat of the Republic of China who published
- Jiang Chengji (born 1975) (: 蔣丞稷; born 1975 in Shanghai) is
- Jiang Tingxi (蒋廷锡; 1669–1732), courtesy name Yangsun
- Tyias Browning, known as Jiang Guangtai in China (simplified Chinese: 蒋光太; traditional Chinese: 蔣光太; pinyin: Jiǎng Guāngtài; born 27 May 1994) is
- Jiang Zhuoqing(Chinese: 蒋卓庆; pinyin: Jiăng Zhuóqìng; born August 1959) is a Chinese politician, who is serving as the Chairperson of the Shanghai People's
- Jiang Xiaowan, recorded. Jiang was more often referred to as Chiang Ssu-Yeh (Wade–Giles) or Jiang Siye (Pinyin), which was likely the mistranscription of Chinese: 蔣師爺; lit
- Jiang Shiquan (蒋士铨; 1725–1784) was a Chinese poet of the Qing dynasty. He was active
- Jiang Shen (蔣伸) (799–881), courtesy name Dazhi (大直), formally the Duke of Le'an (樂安公), was an official of the Chinese dynasty Tang dynasty, serving as
- Jiang Guangnai (蒋光鼐; 1888 – 1967)
- Jiang Baili
- Jiang Shusheng (蒋树声; traditional Chinese: 蔣樹聲; pinyin: Jiǎng Shùshēng; born April 1940 in Wuxi, Jiangsu) is a Chinese physicist and
- Jiang Tingting (蒋婷婷; born 1986 in Chengdu, Sichuan) is a Chinese synchronized swimmer
- Jiang Gaoming (蒋高明) is a professor and Ph.D. tutor at the Chinese Academy of Sciences’
- Jiang Jing (Water Margin), fictional character in Water Margin, one of the Four Great Classical Novels of Chinese literature. Nicknamed "Divine Mathematician," he ranks 53rd among the 108 Stars of Destiny and 17th among the 72 Earthly Fiends.
- Jiang Shuo (Chinese: 蔣朔; pinyin: Jiáng Shuò) (born 1958, Beijing, China) is a Chinese contemporary sculptor. Jiang Shuo was born in 1958 in Beijing, China
- Jiang Wenwen (synchronized swimmer) (simplified Chinese: 蒋文文; traditional Chinese: 蔣文文; pinyin: Jiǎng Wénwén; born 25 September 1986 in Chengdu, Sichuan) is a Chinese synchronized
- Ai Qing; born Jiǎng Zhènghán (Chinese: 蒋正涵; pinyin: Jiǎng Zhènghán) and styled Jiǎng Hǎichéng (Chinese: 蒋海澄; pinyin: Jiǎng Hǎichéng); March 27,
- Jiang Yefei (Chinese: 蔣 葉菲; born 22 February 1967) is a Chinese fencer. He competed in the team sabre event at the 1992 Summer Olympics. "Jiang Yefei
- Jiang Liang (simplified Chinese: 蒋亮; traditional Chinese: 蔣亮; pinyin: Jiǎng Liàng; born 4 November 1989) is a Chinese footballer
- Jiang Zilong (simplified Chinese: 蒋子龙; traditional Chinese: 蔣子龍; pinyin: Jiǎng Zilóng; born August 1941) is a Chinese author of fiction and essays
- Jiang Fucong (12 November 1898 - 21 September 1990), courtesy name Weitang, was a Chinese educator and politician of the Republic of China. Jiang was
- Jiang Ping (character), courtesy name Zechang, is a fictional Song dynasty knight-errant from the 19th-century Chinese novels The Seven Heroes and Five Gallants
- Qiao Shi born Jiang Zhitong (蔣志彤; Jiǎng Zhìtóng) in 1924 in Shanghai, ancestry Dinghai, Chinese politician and one of the top leaders of the Chinese Communist Party
- Jiang Xin (badminton) (Chinese: 蔣欣; born 18 January 1969) is a Chinese former badminton player who later move to Australia and run a badminton school in Melbourne
- Jiang Guang-nan (born 30 July 1948) is a former Taiwanese cyclist. He competed in team time trial at the 1968 Summer Olympics. "Jiang Guang-Nan Olympic
- Chiang Yee (simplified Chinese: 蒋彝; traditional Chinese: 蔣彝; pinyin: Jiǎng Yí; Wade–Giles: Chiang I; 19 May 1903 – 26 October 1977), self-styled as "The
- Chiang Hsiao-wu (traditional Chinese: 蔣孝武; simplified Chinese: 蒋孝武; pinyin: Jiǎng Xiàowǔ; also known as Alex Chiang; April 25, 1945 - July 1, 1991) was
- Jiang Yiyuan (Chinese: 蒋亦元; 1928 - 2020) was a Chinese agricultural engineer and academician of the Chinese
- Jiang Hongde (Chinese: 蒋洪德; 4 July 1942 – 4 January 2020) was a Chinese engineer and professor at Tsinghua University. Jiang was born in Hengyang, Hunan
- Jiang Xuemo (Chinese: 蒋学模; 24 March 1918 – 18 July 2008) was a Chinese economist, translator and professor at Fudan University. During his 70-year academic
- Chiang Chung-ling (Chinese: 蔣仲苓; pinyin: Jiǎng Zhònglíng, September 21, 1922 – March 18, 2015) was a Taiwanese army general, former Minister of Defense
- Sho-Chieh Tsiang (traditional Chinese: 蔣碩傑; simplified Chinese: 蒋硕杰; pinyin: Jiǎng Shuòjié; August 25, 1918 – October 21, 1993) was a Chinese-American
- Jiang Bo (figure skater) (蒋博; traditional Chinese: 蔣博; pinyin: Jiǎng Bó; born in Qiqihar) is a Chinese male pair skater. He skates with partner Li
- Chiang Hsiao-wen (Chinese: 蔣孝文; also known as Alan Chiang; 14 December 1935 – 14 April 1989) was the eldest son of Chiang Ching-kuo, the President of ROC
- 1990 Guangzhou Baiyun airport collisions hijacker Jiang Xiaofeng (simplified Chinese: 蒋晓峰; traditional Chinese: 蔣曉峰; pinyin: Jiăng Xiăofēng), born 11 August 1969 in Linli
- Chiang Wei-ling (Chinese: 蔣偉寧; pinyin: Jiǎng Wěiníng; born 2 September 1957) is an educator in the Republic of China. He was the Minister of the Ministry of Education (MOE) of the Executive Yuan in 2012–2014. He is also the former President of National Central University in Taoyuan.
- "Jiang Xingge Reencounters His Pearl Shirt" (蔣興哥重會珍珠衫), also translated as "The Pearl-sewn Shirt" or "The Pearl Shirt Reencountered", is a Chinese novella
- Ram Chiang (born 1961), Hong Kong singer
- Chiang Wei-shui (Chinese: 蔣渭水; Pe̍h-ōe-jī: Chiúⁿ Ūi-súi; 6 August 1890 – 5 August 1931) was a Taiwanese physician and activist. He was a founding member
- Chiang Nai-shin (Chinese: 蔣乃辛; born 24 September 1948) is a Taiwanese politician. He served in the Taipei City Council from 1982 to 2009, when he was
- Cheo Chai Chen (蒋才正; 1951–2024), Singaporean politician
