= Wang Yongchen =

Chinese environmentalist (born 1954)

- 汪永晨
- Born: 1954 (age 70–71); Anhui
- Occupation(s): Environmental advocate, journalist

Wang Yongchen (Chinese: 汪永晨; pinyin: Wāng Yǒngchén) is the Senior Environment Reporter for China National Radio. Wang founded Green Earth Volunteers, a Chinese environmental NGO, in 1996. She is the president of the group and organizes many of its activities.

== Biography ==
Wang received her graduates' degree at Peking University. She worked as a journalist specializing in the environment. A pioneer of radio programs for the environment, she founded "Classroom on Wednesday" and "Journalists' Salon," which encourage public awareness as well as debate. She specifically hopes to increase awareness on the relationship between humans and nature and the social responsibility in the protection of nature.

She has received many awards for her reporting including the Asia-Pacific Broadcasting Union prize in 1993, 1999 and 2001, the Condé Nast Traveler Environmental Award in 2004, and the Earth award or Globe award in 2001. The latter is China's most esteemed environmental award. She contributed the Earth award prize money, a sum of 20,000 RMB, to China's Environmental Foundation and founded the Green Earth Education Fund.

== Involvement with the Nu River ==
The Nu River, in southwestern China, is one of only two major rivers in China that remain undammed. Proponents of the dam project said it was a prime source for hydroelectricity, and said it would lift locals out of poverty. Opponents said it threatened the area's cultural and ecological diversity. The Nu River is home to more than 7,000 plant species, more than half of China's animal species, and some 22 ethnic minority groups.

Wang organized a campaign to stop dam projects on the Nu River. Their efforts led to Premier Wen Jiabao's announcement in April 2004 to put the dam project on hold due to concerns about the environment and ethnic minorities. The project could still be completed despite the fact that many locals do not support the project. In August 2005, scores of Chinese organizations and individuals signed an open letter to the government, asking the authorities to publish environmental-impact documents and hold public hearings on the Nu River plans. By August 2006, the government still had not responded to the open letter.

In February, contractors claimed the Nu River project was set to begin, with the project developer, China Huadian, beginning initial preparations. But it is still unclear whether the project received final approval from Beijing. A local government official reportedly denied the dam had been approved, saying a mandatory green assessment by the State Environmental Protection Administration (SEPA) was still pending.

== Positions ==
Wang thinks it is a false choice to choose between economic development and environmental protection:

"The biggest problem in increasing awareness, I think, is that environmental protection still involves nothing but slogans. While many people see a conflict between economic development and environmental protection, I believe that when you come closer to nature to learn more about it, you will find no real conflict between the two. On the contrary, a deteriorating environment makes economic development a 'mission impossible.' It is just like when people sacrifice health to make money and then have to spend that money to recover their health. The Green Earth Volunteers is a big family of nature lovers. If you are interested in our goals, just join us and you will be surprised at how much you will enjoy."

== Works ==
Wang publishes articles for chinadialogue, which are available in Chinese and English.

- Letting nature heal itself chinadialogue 18 July 2008
- A yellow card for the Three Parallel Rivers chinadialogue 3 August 2007
- China’s water resources: environmental security needed chinadialogue 7 March 2007
- What if nature could speak? chinadialogue 15 February 2007
- Quenching China’s thirst chinadialogue 2 February 2007
- Farewell to the baiji chinadialogue 10 January 2007
- Report from the Nu River: "Nobody has told us anything" chinadialogue 2 August 2006

== See also ==
- Environment of China
- Ministry of Environmental Protection of the People's Republic of China
- Salween River
