= Xiaowan =

Xiaowan may refer to:

- Dong Xiaowan (1624–1651), Chinese Yiji
- Jiang Xiaowan, Chinese explorer
- Xiaowan Dam
