= High-mountain Asia =

Geographic region of Asia

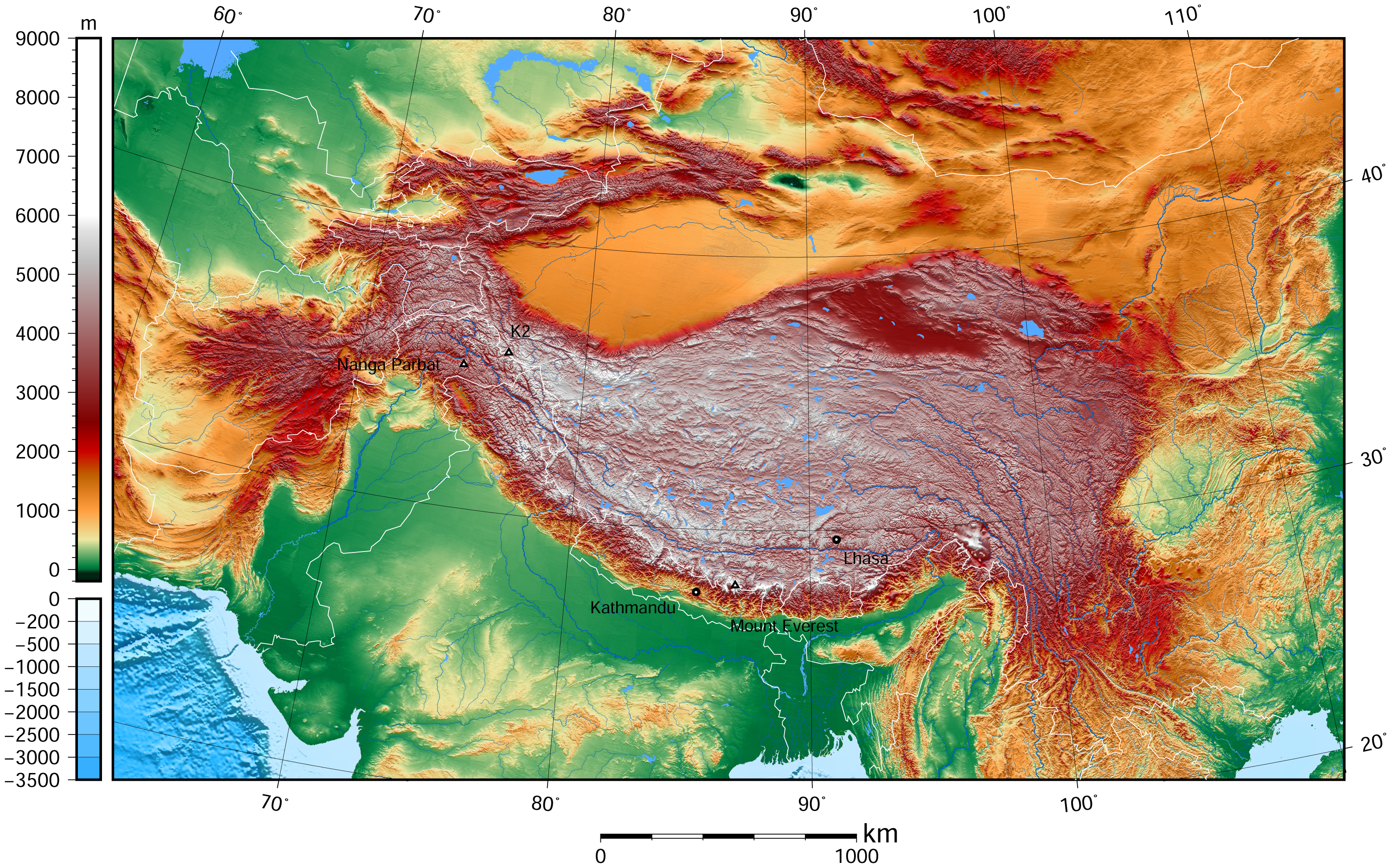
Tibet and surrounding areas

High-mountain Asia (HMA) or High Asia is a high-elevation geographic region in central-south Asia that includes numerous cordillera and highland systems around the Tibetan Plateau, encompassing regions of East, Southeast, South and Central Asia. The region was orogenically formed by the continental collision of the Indian Plate into (and underneath) the Eurasian Plate.

According to NASA, the region is the "world's largest reservoir of perennial glaciers and snow outside of the Earth's polar ice sheets", and has been nicknamed the "Third Pole". Their meltwaters and runoffs form the headwaters of river systems that support the drinking water and food production of nearly 3 billion people, and hydrological and climate changes in the mountains affect "ecosystem services, agriculture, energy and livelihood" for all the surrounding areas. NASA has a High Mountain Asia Team (HiMAT) to study the region.

In a 2020 study, the term High Asia or High Mountain Asia was used metaphorically to categorise Kashmir, Hazara, Nuristan, Laghman, Azad Kashmir, Jammu, Himachal Pradesh, Ladakh, Gilgit Baltistan, Chitral, Western Tibet, Western Xinjiang, Badakhshan, Gorno Badakhshan, Fergana, Osh and Turkistan Region. These rich resource areas are surrounded by the five major mountainous systems of Tien Shan, Pamirs, Karakoram, Hindu Kush and Western Himalayas and the three main river systems of Amu Darya, Syr Darya and Indus. The work further highlighted the role of United States, China, Russia, UK, India, Pakistan, Afghanistan, Kazakhstan, Uzbekistan, Kyrgyzstan, Tajikistan, Turkey, Iran and other players involved in The New Great Game over who will dominate High Asia in the 21st century.

== Toponymy ==
Due to its inclusion of the highest mountains on Earth, the region has been metaphorically labelled the "Roof of the World". The phrase was historically applied to the Pamirs, and then to Tibet.

== Geography ==
High-mountain Asia is centered around the Tibetan Plateau and extends to the surrounding regions as numerous mountain ranges:

- south – the Himalayas and Arakan Mountains;
- southeast – the Hengduan Mountains, Yun-Gui Plateau and Shan–Tenasserim ranges;
- east – the Qinling Mountains and various ranges that edge the Sichuan Basin;
- north – the Qilian Mountains, Kunlun Mountains, Tian Shan ranges and (arguably) Altai Mountains as well as parts of the Mongolian Plateau;
- northwest – the Pamir-Alay and Pamir Mountains;
- west and southwest – the Karakoram, Hindu Kush and Sulaiman–Kirthar Mountains.

These mountain range networks contains all 14 peaks above 8,000 m (26,000 ft) and all of the peaks above 7,000 m (23,000 ft), and expand across the mountainous Chinese provinces of Tibet, Xinjiang, Sichuan and Yunnan (including the flat and depressed Tarim Basin in southern Xinjiang, which contains China's largest desert, the Taklamakan), northern Myanmar, the Himalayan nations of Nepal and Bhutan as well as north/northwestern Pakistan and northeastern India, and most of the southeastern Central Asian nations of Kyrgyzstan, Tajikistan and Afghanistan. Their rain shadows are partly responsible for the cold arid climate in parts of Central Asia and the Mongolian Plateau.

== See also ==
- Asian Water Tower, the high-mountain cryospheric and hydrological system of High-mountain Asia
