= Asian Water Tower =

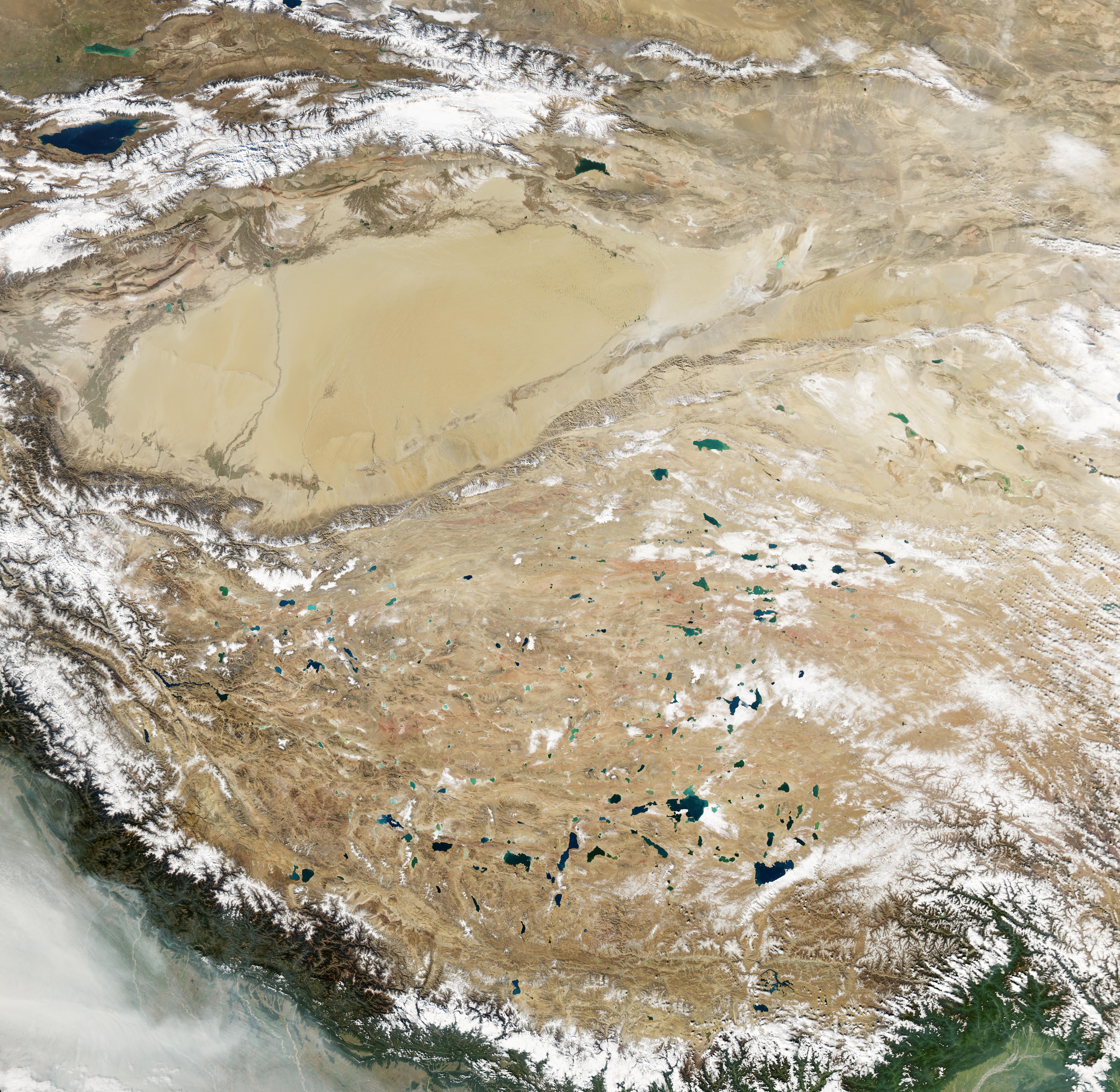
Natural-colour satellite image of the Tibetan Plateau, showing its extensive high-altitude lakes and snow- and ice-covered terrain that form part of the Asian Water Tower.

Asian Water Tower (AWT) is a term used in the scientific literature for the high-mountain cryospheric and hydrological system of High-mountain Asia, centered on the Tibetan Plateau and encompassing, in broader definitions, the adjacent Himalayas, Karakoram, Hindu Kush and Tian Shan mountain ranges. The region contains extensive glaciers, snowpack and frozen ground that store water at high elevations and release it through meltwater and runoff to downstream river basins. The system functions as a dynamic water distribution system in which water is exchanged among atmospheric, solid and liquid reservoirs. It is an important source of freshwater for large populations across Asia.

== Terminology and geographic scope ==
The term Asian Water Tower is used at somewhat different geographic scales in the scientific literature. Miao et al. describe the Tibetan Plateau itself as the Asian Water Tower and identify it as the source of ten major Asian river systems. A broader definition used in more recent research encompasses the Tibetan Plateau together with the surrounding mountain ranges of the Himalayas, Karakoram, Hindu Kush and Tian Shan and their downstream basins.

Under the broader definition, the Asian Water Tower and its downstream basins cover approximately 6.5 million km², with an average elevation exceeding 4,000 metres above sea level. The Tibetan Plateau covers approximately 3 million km² and has an average elevation above 4,000 metres. It contains more than 100,000 km² of glaciers and approximately 1 million km² of frozen soil.

The Tibetan Plateau and surrounding high mountains are also associated with the term "Third Pole", referring to the large concentration of snow and ice at high elevations outside the Arctic and Antarctica. The Himalayas are sometimes described specifically as the "water towers of Asia" because their glaciers and snowpack contribute substantially to downstream water supplies.

The use of the term "water tower" has also been questioned. Tian et al. argued that the metaphor may overstate the contribution of the Tibetan Plateau to downstream river discharge. Based on runoff data for major rivers originating on the plateau, they estimated that runoff generated within the Tibetan Plateau accounts for a weighted average of approximately 18% of total basin discharge, with estimates ranging from 6% to 49%; the proportion was highest for the Indus at about 49%. They also argued that glacier and snowmelt contribute a relatively small proportion of runoff from rivers originating on the Tibetan Plateau, estimating a glacier-melt contribution of about 5.5% for the exorheic rivers of the plateau and a snowmelt contribution of approximately 10–30%. They concluded that local precipitation is the dominant contributor to river flows in these basins. They proposed replacing the term "Asian Water Tower" with "Towering Asian Spring", arguing that the latter better reflects the Tibetan Plateau's role as the source of several major Asian rivers while avoiding the implication that it is the dominant source of their total downstream water supply.

== Hydrological function ==
The Asian Water Tower functions as a natural high-altitude water-storage and release system. Precipitation is stored in forms including snow, glaciers, lakes and frozen ground, and is subsequently released through snowmelt, glacial melting and runoff into downstream rivers.

This storage function is important because precipitation and water demand vary seasonally. In parts of High-mountain Asia, glacier and snowmelt provide water during periods when rainfall-runoff is limited. Meltwater can therefore supplement precipitation and contribute to the maintenance of river flows during dry periods. Historically, the Asian Water Tower maintained a relative balance among water stored in solid and liquid forms and among different freshwater reservoirs. Climate change has altered this balance through changes in glacier and snowmelt, the size and distribution of alpine lakes, and river runoff.

The importance of meltwater varies substantially between river basins. It is particularly important in the Indus River basin, Amu Darya basin and Tarim River basin, where rainfall-runoff contributions are relatively limited. In other parts of the region, particularly southeastern basins, rainfall and monsoon precipitation make a larger contribution to water supply. The spatial and seasonal distribution of water in the Asian Water Tower is influenced by the interaction between the westerlies and the Indian monsoon. This contributes to marked differences in precipitation, snow and glacier melt, and freshwater availability between the northern and southern parts of the region.

The water-tower function can also buffer interannual variability in precipitation. During years with relatively weak monsoon precipitation, meltwater can partly compensate for rainfall deficits and reduce the severity of drought and water shortages in some downstream regions.

== River systems and downstream dependence ==
Major rivers with sources in Tibet

The Asian Water Tower is associated with ten major Asian river systems. These rivers flow from the highlands towards densely populated regions of Central, South and East Asia and supply water to numerous downstream countries.

Major river systems associated with the Asian Water Tower include the Yellow, Yangtze, Indus, Mekong, Salween, Ganges, Brahmaputra, Yarlung Zangbo, Amu Darya, Syr Darya and Tarim River. The relative importance of mountain water differs between basins.

The 2020 global assessment of mountain water towers ranked water towers according to both the amount of water they supply and the dependence of downstream populations and ecosystems on that water. The assessment found that the most important water towers were also among the most vulnerable to water stress, governance problems, hydropolitical tensions, and future climatic and socioeconomic changes. It estimated that mountain water towers globally supply water to approximately 1.9 billion people.

In the Asian region, the Indus water tower was ranked as the most relied-upon mountain water tower in the global assessment. The Indus, Tarim, Amu Darya, Syr Darya and Ganges–Brahmaputra systems were among the Asian water towers identified as particularly important and vulnerable.

The Himalayas alone contain extensive glaciers and snowpack whose meltwater drains into ten river basins, including the Indus and Ganges. Together with monsoon rainfall, this water contributes to the supply of more than one billion people in the surrounding region.

== Urban and agricultural water supply ==
Meltwater contributes to urban water supplies in many downstream areas. A 2026 study found that 782 cities in the downstream regions of the Asian Water Tower had at least one month in which meltwater supplied more than half of their seasonal water supply. These highly meltwater-dependent cities were concentrated particularly in the Indus, Yellow River, Amu Darya and Tarim basins.

The importance of meltwater is strongly seasonal. In the historical period examined by the 2026 study, meltwater reduced urban water scarcity for an estimated 22.9–28.7 million people by supplementing water supplies during dry periods. The effect was particularly pronounced during the pre-monsoon season, when meltwater supplied water before the arrival of the summer monsoon.

Mountain water is also important to downstream agriculture. In regions where irrigation depends substantially on rivers originating in High-mountain Asia, changes in the amount and seasonal timing of mountain runoff can affect water resources available for agricultural production.

== Climate change ==
The Asian Water Tower is sensitive to climate change because of its extensive stores of snow and ice. Between 1980 and 2018, the Asian Water Tower warmed by an average of 0.42 °C per decade, approximately twice the global average rate. Studies of the Himalayan region have documented changes in snowpack and increased glacial melting associated with warming. Changes in precipitation have also varied spatially, with increases in parts of the northwestern region and decreases in some southern and major river basins.

Climate warming can initially increase meltwater availability as glaciers lose mass more rapidly. Continued glacier mass loss, however, reduces the amount of ice available for future melting. The resulting changes therefore depend on both the rate of glacier retreat and the timing of the transition from increased to declining meltwater supply. The changes are accompanied by a redistribution of freshwater among reservoirs. Between 2000 and 2018, total glacier mass in the Asian Water Tower decreased by about 340 gigatonnes, while the total water mass stored in lakes increased by about 166 gigatonnes.

Climate change can also alter the seasonal distribution of meltwater. The 2026 study projected that meltwater availability could increase during parts of the monsoon season while declining substantially during the dry season in many highly meltwater-dependent catchments. Such a redistribution can weaken the water-tower function even where total annual meltwater does not immediately decline, because additional water becomes available when rainfall is already relatively abundant rather than during periods of greatest demand.

The vulnerability of the Asian Water Tower therefore depends not only on the total amount of water stored in glaciers and snow, but also on the timing of its release and the ability of downstream societies to adapt to changes in supply and demand.

== Groundwater ==
Groundwater forms another component of the hydrological system associated with High-mountain Asia. A satellite-based study published in 2026 estimated that groundwater storage across the region declined by approximately 24.2 billion tonnes per year between 2003 and 2020.

Approximately two-thirds of High-mountain Asia experienced declining groundwater storage during that period. The largest losses occurred in densely populated, irrigation-intensive downstream basins, including the Ganges–Brahmaputra, Indus and Amu Darya basins. Some higher-elevation inland areas experienced localized increases in groundwater storage.

The study attributed groundwater changes to both climatic factors and human water use. Climate-related factors accounted for nearly half of the observed variability, while groundwater withdrawals became an increasingly important contributor to depletion, particularly in downstream agricultural areas, after 2010.

Under continued patterns of water use, groundwater depletion is projected to continue. Increased glacier melt could temporarily reduce the rate of groundwater decline in some areas around the 2060s, but this effect is projected to be temporary, with depletion subsequently accelerating if current water-use patterns persist.

== Scientific observation ==
Quantifying the water balance of the Asian Water Tower is difficult because of its high elevation, complex topography and sparse observation network. Precipitation measurements are particularly challenging because much precipitation falls as snow and is affected by strong winds.

A 2024 study found evidence that precipitation over the Asian Water Tower has been substantially underestimated in observational datasets. The authors attributed the problem partly to instrumental error caused by wind-induced gauge undercatch and partly to representativeness errors resulting from sparse and unevenly distributed gauges and complex local surface conditions.

The study identified several apparent inconsistencies in existing water-cycle estimates, including cases in which estimated evapotranspiration exceeded observed precipitation, runoff coefficients became unrealistically high, or accumulated snow water equivalent exceeded contemporaneous measured precipitation.

These uncertainties affect estimates of precipitation, runoff, evapotranspiration and the overall water balance of the region. The authors therefore called for improved precipitation measurement, including instruments better suited to measuring solid precipitation and approaches that address both instrumental and spatial representativeness errors.

== Vulnerability and management ==
The importance of the Asian Water Tower is determined not only by the quantity of water stored in the mountains but also by the dependence of downstream societies and ecosystems on that water. The global assessment of mountain water towers incorporated downstream water demand, water stress, governance, hydropolitical tensions, and projected climatic and socioeconomic changes when evaluating vulnerability.

The Asian water towers were among the most important and vulnerable systems identified in that assessment. The Indus system was ranked as the most relied-upon water tower globally, while several other Asian systems were also identified as highly important and vulnerable.

Tian et al. argued that an exaggerated perception of the Tibetan Plateau as the primary source of downstream river water could influence policy-making and diplomatic relations among riparian countries. They argued that emphasizing the plateau as a "water tower" may encourage excessive focus on changes occurring in the headwaters, while adaptive management in downstream basins can also be important for addressing future water scarcity. They further suggested that more accurate understanding and communication of the relative contributions of headwater runoff, precipitation, snowmelt and glacier melt could help strengthen transboundary cooperation.

Climate change is interacting with population growth, urbanization and increasing water demand. A review by Yao et al. concluded that projected increases in precipitation and river runoff are unlikely to keep pace with accelerating water demand in downstream regions and countries. Recent modelling suggests that projected increases in annual meltwater will provide only limited relief from future urban water scarcity because the urban population exposed to water scarcity is expected to grow substantially faster than the contribution of meltwater. The seasonal shift in meltwater towards the monsoon season further limits its capacity to compensate for dry-season shortages.

The transboundary nature of the river systems originating in High-mountain Asia also makes the Asian Water Tower relevant to international water management. The global assessment of mountain water towers emphasized conservation, climate-change adaptation and cooperation among the countries dependent on mountain water as components of strategies for reducing vulnerability. Tian et al. specifically cautioned that characterizing the Tibetan Plateau as a "tap" or dominant source of downstream water could contribute to mistrust among riparian countries, and argued that accurate assessment of water contributions is important for transboundary cooperation.

== See also ==
- Climate change
- Climate change adaptation
- Glacier
- Glacial meltwater
- Groundwater
- High-mountain Asia
- Himalayas
- Hindu Kush
- Karakoram
- Permafrost
- Snowpack
- Third Pole
- Tian Shan
- Tibetan Plateau
- Transboundary river
- Water governance
- Water resources
- Water scarcity
