= Tibetan Plateau =

Plateau in Central, South and East Asia

- 青藏高原 (Qīng–Zàng Gāoyuán, Qinghai–Tibet Plateau)
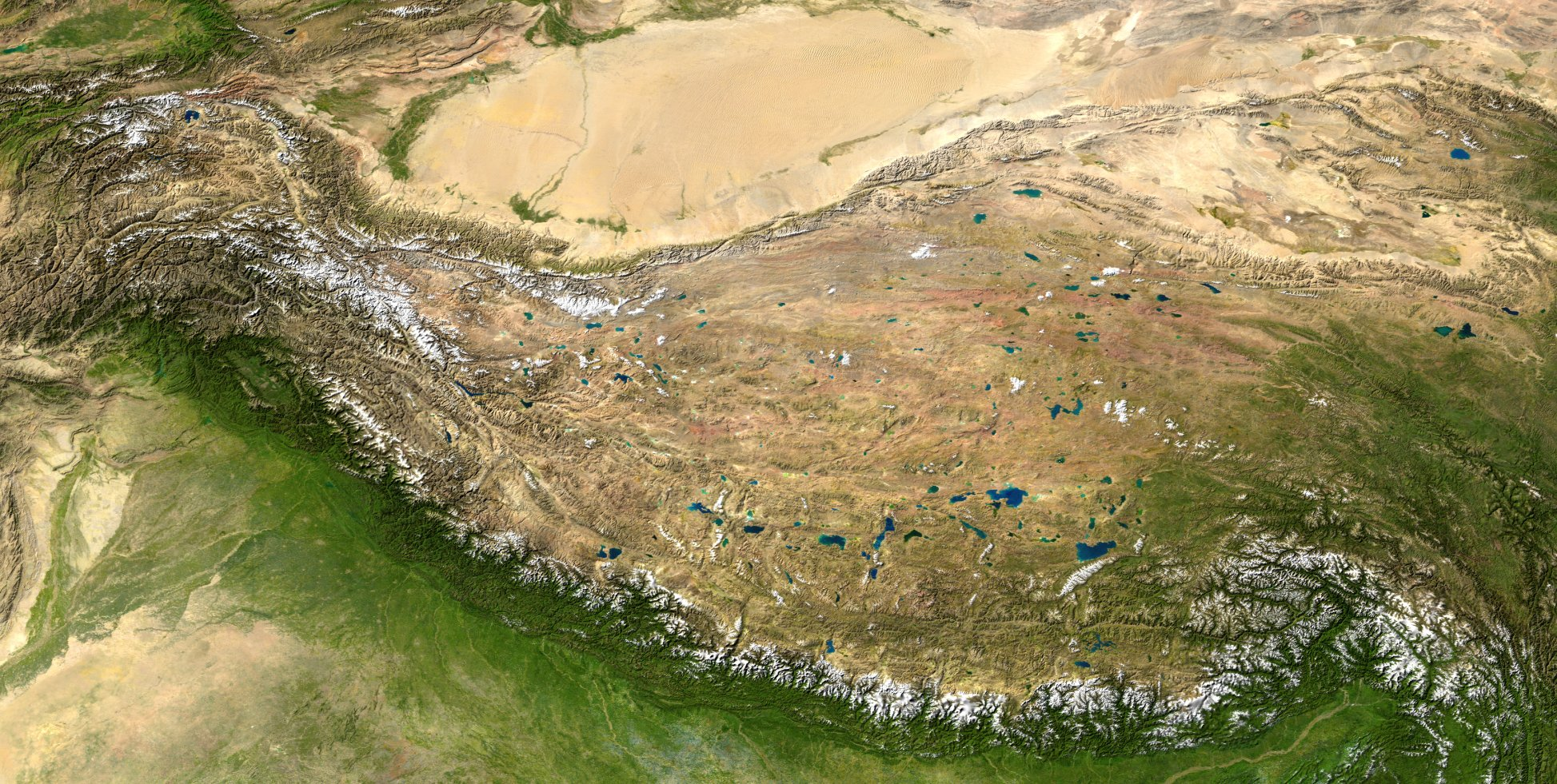
- The Tibetan Plateau lies between the Himalayan range to the south and the Taklamakan Desert to the north. (Composite image)

Highest point
- Peak: Mount Everest, Border of Nepal and Tibet, China
- Elevation: 8,849 m

Dimensions
- Length: 2,500 km (1,600 mi)
- Width: 1,000 km (620 mi)
- Area: 2,500,000 km^{2} (970,000 mi^{2})

Geography
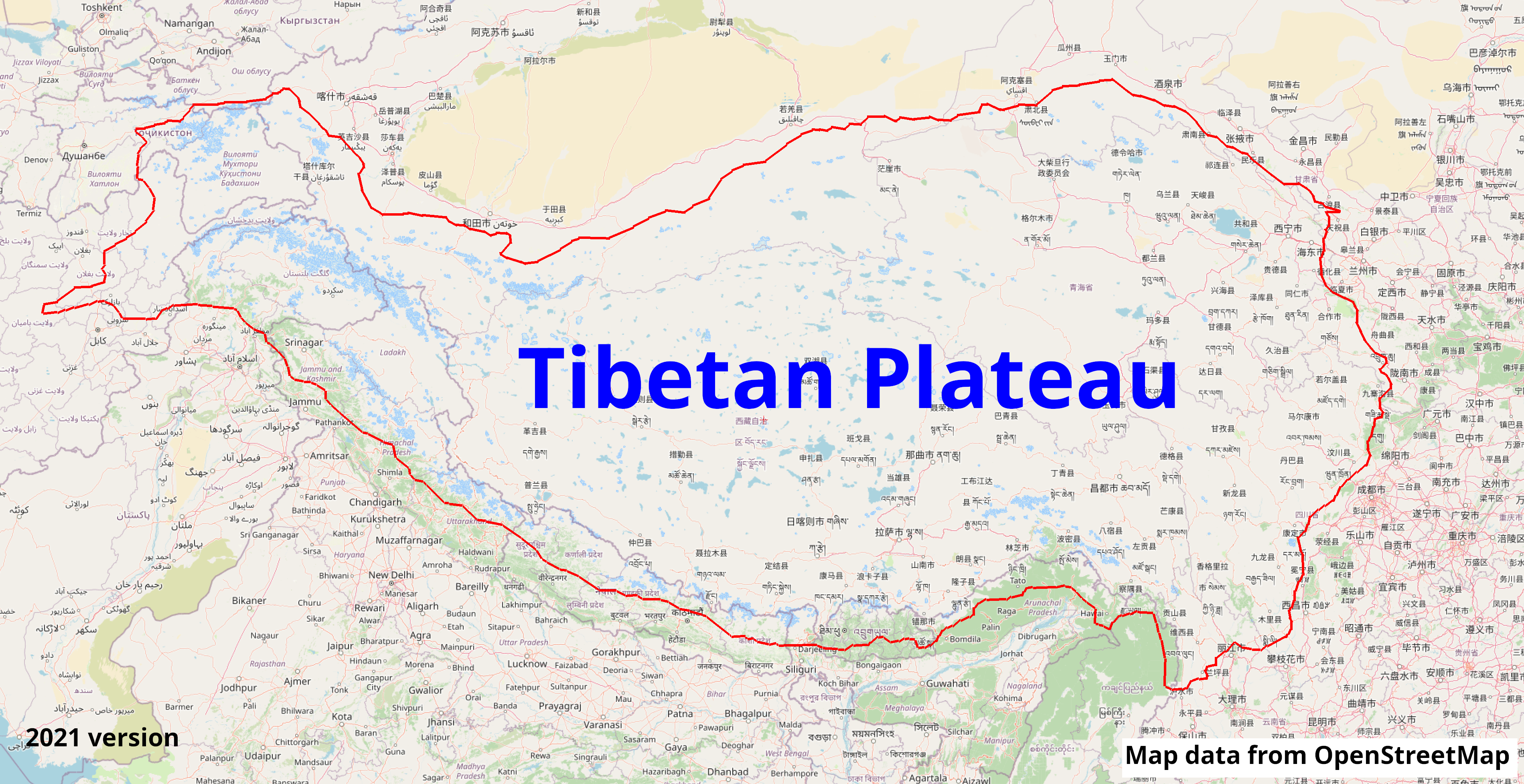
- Boundary of Tibetan Plateau (2021 Version)
- Location: China (Tibet, Qinghai, Western Sichuan, Northern Yunnan, Southern Xinjiang, Western Gansu); India (Ladakh, Jammu and Kashmir, North and East Himachal Pradesh, Northern Uttarakhand, Northern Sikkim, Darjeeling, Northern Arunachal Pradesh); Pakistan (Baltistan); Afghanistan (Wakhan Corridor); Nepal (Northern Nepal); Bhutan; Tajikistan (Eastern Tajikistan); Kyrgyzstan (Southern Kyrgyzstan)
- Range coordinates: 33°N 88°E

Geology
- Formed by: Continental collision between the Indian and Eurasian plates
- Orogeny: Alpine orogeny
- Rock age: Late Cretaceous–present (uplift ongoing)

The Tibetan Plateau, (Note: Tibetan: བོད་ས་མཐོ།, Wylie: bod sa mtho) also known as the Qinghai–Tibet Plateau, Qingzang Plateau, (Note: Chinese: 青藏高原; pinyin: Qīng–Zàng Gāoyuán) is a vast elevated plateau located at the intersection of Central, South, and East Asia. Geographically, Tibet is located to the north of the Himalayas and the Indian subcontinent, and to the south of the Tarim Basin and the Mongolian Plateau. Geopolitically, it covers most of the Tibet Autonomous Region, most of Qinghai, the western half of Sichuan, southern Gansu Province, southern Xinjiang Province in Western China, Bhutan, the Indian regions of Ladakh and Lahaul and Spiti (Himachal Pradesh) as well as Gilgit-Baltistan in Pakistan, northwestern Nepal, eastern Tajikistan and southern Kyrgyzstan.

It stretches approximately 1,000 kilometres (620 mi) north to south and 2,500 kilometres (1,600 mi) east to west. It is the world's largest and highest plateau above sea level, with an area of 2,500,000 square kilometres (970,000 sq mi). With an average elevation exceeding 4,500 metres (14,800 ft) and being surrounded by imposing mountain ranges that harbor the world's two highest summits, Mount Everest and K2, the Tibetan Plateau is often referred to as "the Roof of the World".

The plateau contains the headwaters of most of the streams in surrounding regions. This includes the three longest rivers in Asia (the Yellow, Yangtze, and Mekong). Its tens of thousands of glaciers and other geographical and ecological features serve as a natural "water tower", storing water and regulating river flow. It is sometimes termed the Third Pole because its ice fields contain the largest reserve of fresh water outside the polar regions. The impact of climate change on the Tibetan Plateau is of ongoing scientific interest.

== Description ==
The Tibetan Plateau is surrounded by the massive mountain ranges of high-mountain Asia. The plateau is bordered to the south by the inner Himalayan range, to the north by the Kunlun Mountains which separate it from the Tarim Basin, and to the northeast by the Qilian Mountains, which separate it from the Hexi Corridor and Gobi Desert. To the east and southeast are the Salween, Mekong, and Yangtze rivers in northwest Yunnan, western Sichuan, and southwest Qinghai. In the west, the rugged Karakoram range of northern Kashmir curves around the plateau's edge. The Indus and the Brahmaputra both originate in the western Tibetan Plateau in the vicinity of Lake Manasarovar.

The plateau is bounded in the north by a broad escarpment, formed largely by the Altyn Tagh range, where the terrain drops from a plateau interior generally above 4,000 to 5,000 metres (13,000 to 16,000 ft) to the adjacent Tarim Basin at around 1,000 to 1,400 metres (3,300 to 4,600 ft). A range of mountains runs along the escarpment. About halfway across the Tarim Basin the bounding range becomes the Altyn-Tagh, and the Kunluns, by convention, continue somewhat to the south. In the 'V' formed by this split is the western part of the Qaidam Basin. The Altyn-Tagh ends near the Dangjin pass on the Dunhuang–Golmud road. To the west are short ranges called the Danghe, Yema, Shule, and Tulai Nanshans. The easternmost range is the Qilian Mountains. The line of mountains continues east of the plateau as the Qinling, which forms a major physical and climatic divide between North China and South China, separating the Loess Plateau and Wei River valley to the north from the Han River valley and the Sichuan Basin to the south. North of the mountains runs the Gansu or Hexi Corridor which was the main silk-road route from China proper to the west.

The plateau is a high-altitude arid steppe interspersed with mountain ranges and large brackish lakes. The southern and eastern edges of the steppe have grasslands that can sustainably support populations of nomadic herdsmen, although frost occurs for six months of the year. Proceeding to the north and northwest, the plateau becomes progressively higher, colder, and drier; on this side of the plateau, annual precipitation is only 100 to 300 millimetres (3.9 to 11.8 in), comparable to a polar desert, and permafrost is extensive. In the remote Changtang region in the northwestern part of the plateau, the average altitude exceeds 5,000 metres (16,000 ft) and winter temperatures frequently fall below −35 °C (−31 °F); the region is unsuitable for permanent settlement, and its only population consists of nomadic herders found in its southern part.

== Geology and geological history ==
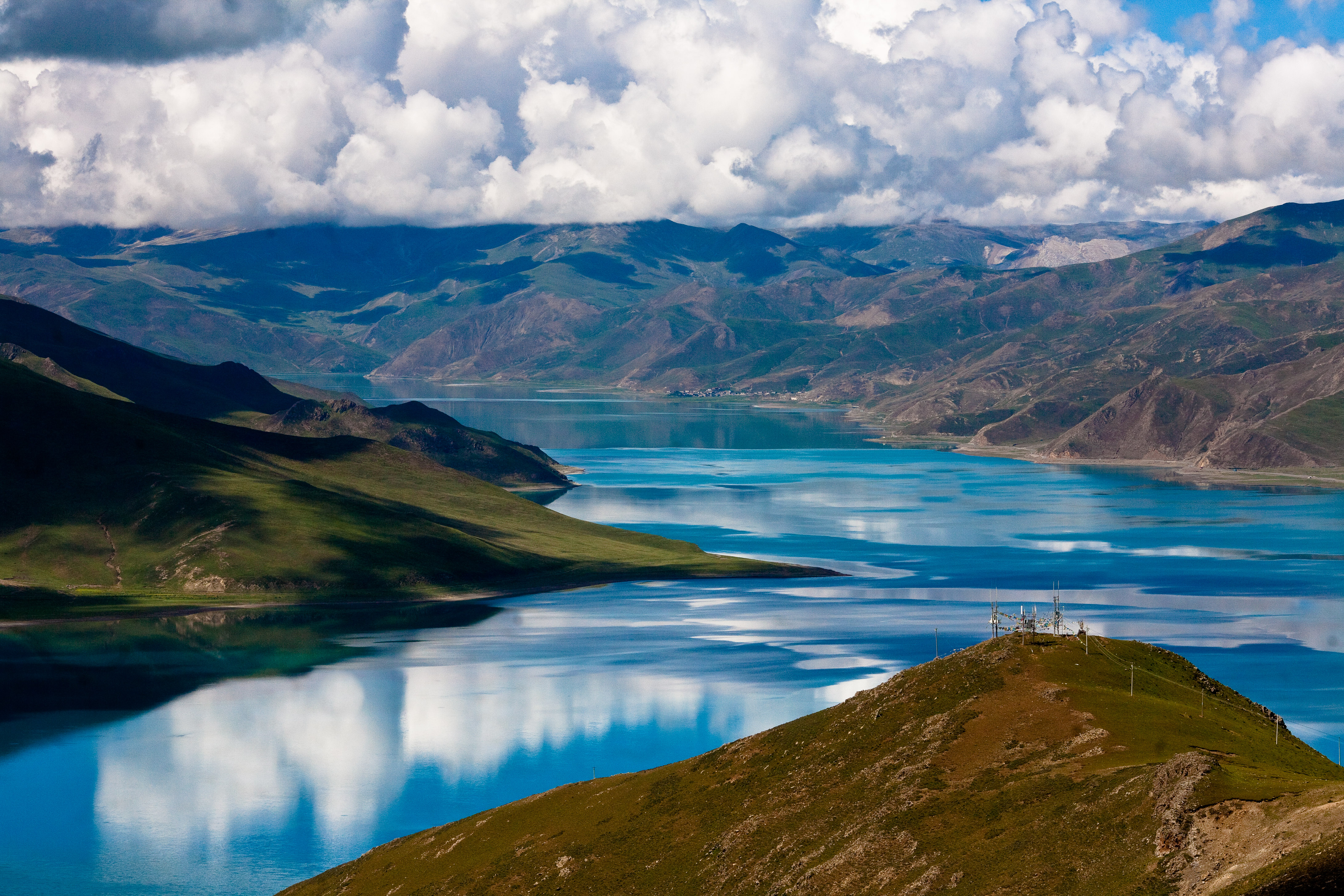
Yamdrok Lake is one of the four largest lakes in Tibet. All four lakes are considered sacred pilgrimage sites in the local tradition.

The geological history of the Tibetan Plateau is closely related to that of the Himalayas. The Himalayas belong to the Alpine orogeny and are among the younger mountain ranges on the planet, consisting mostly of uplifted sedimentary and metamorphic rock. Their formation is a result of a continental collision or orogeny along the convergent boundary between the Indo-Australian plate and the Eurasian plate.

India began drifting northward from Gondwana in the Upper Cretaceous, about 70 million years ago (Mya), moving at about 15 cm (6 in) per year; its collision with the Eurasian plate is most commonly dated to around 55–50 Mya, near the Paleocene–Eocene boundary, though the exact timing remains debated. By about 50 Mya, the fast-moving Indo-Australian plate had completely closed the Tethys Ocean, the existence of which has been determined by sedimentary rocks settled on the ocean floor and the volcanoes that fringed its edges. Since these sediments were light, they crumpled into mountain ranges rather than sinking to the floor. During this early stage of its formation in the Late Palaeogene, Tibet consisted of a deep valley bounded by multiple mountain ranges rather than the more topographically uniform elevated flatland that it is today. The Tibetan Plateau's mean elevation continued to vary since its initial uplift in the Eocene; isotopic records show the plateau's altitude was around 3,000 metres above sea level around the Oligocene–Miocene boundary and that it fell by 900 metres between 25.5 and 21.6 Mya, attributable to tectonic unroofing from east–west extension or to erosion from weathering. The plateau subsequently rose by 500 to 1,000 metres between 21.6 and 20.4 million years ago.

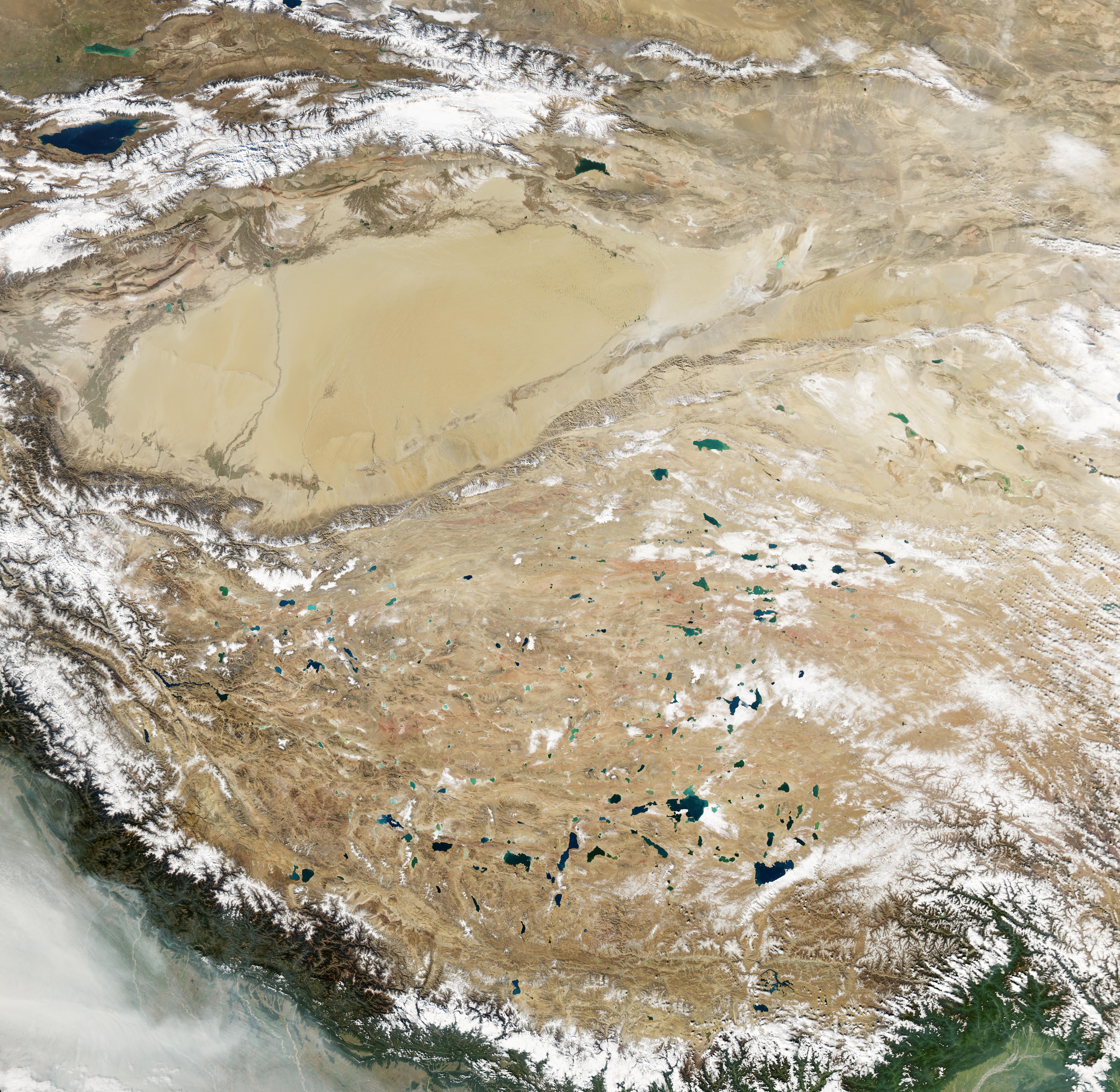
Natural-color satellite image of the Tibetan Plateau.

Palaeobotanical evidence indicates that the Nujiang Suture Zone and the Yarlung-Tsangpo Suture Zone remained tropical or subtropical lowlands until the late Oligocene or Early Miocene, enabling biotic interchange across Tibet. The age of east–west grabens in the Lhasa and Himalaya terranes suggests that the plateau's elevation was close to its modern altitude by around 14 to 8 Mya. Erosion rates in Tibet decreased significantly around 10 Mya. The Indo-Australian plate continues to be driven horizontally below the Tibetan Plateau, which forces the plateau to move upwards; the plateau is still rising at a rate of approximately 5 mm (0.2 in) per year (although erosion reduces the actual increase in height).

Much of the plateau is of relatively low relief. The cause of this is debated among geologists. Some argue that the plateau is an uplifted peneplain formed at low altitude, while others argue that the low relief stems from erosion and infill of topographic depressions that occurred at already high elevations. The current tectonics of the plateau are also debated. The best-regarded explanations are provided by the block model and the alternative continuum model. According to the former, the crust of the plateau is formed of several blocks with little internal deformation separated by major strike-slip faults. In the latter, the plateau is affected by distributed deformation resulting from flow within the crust.

== Environment ==
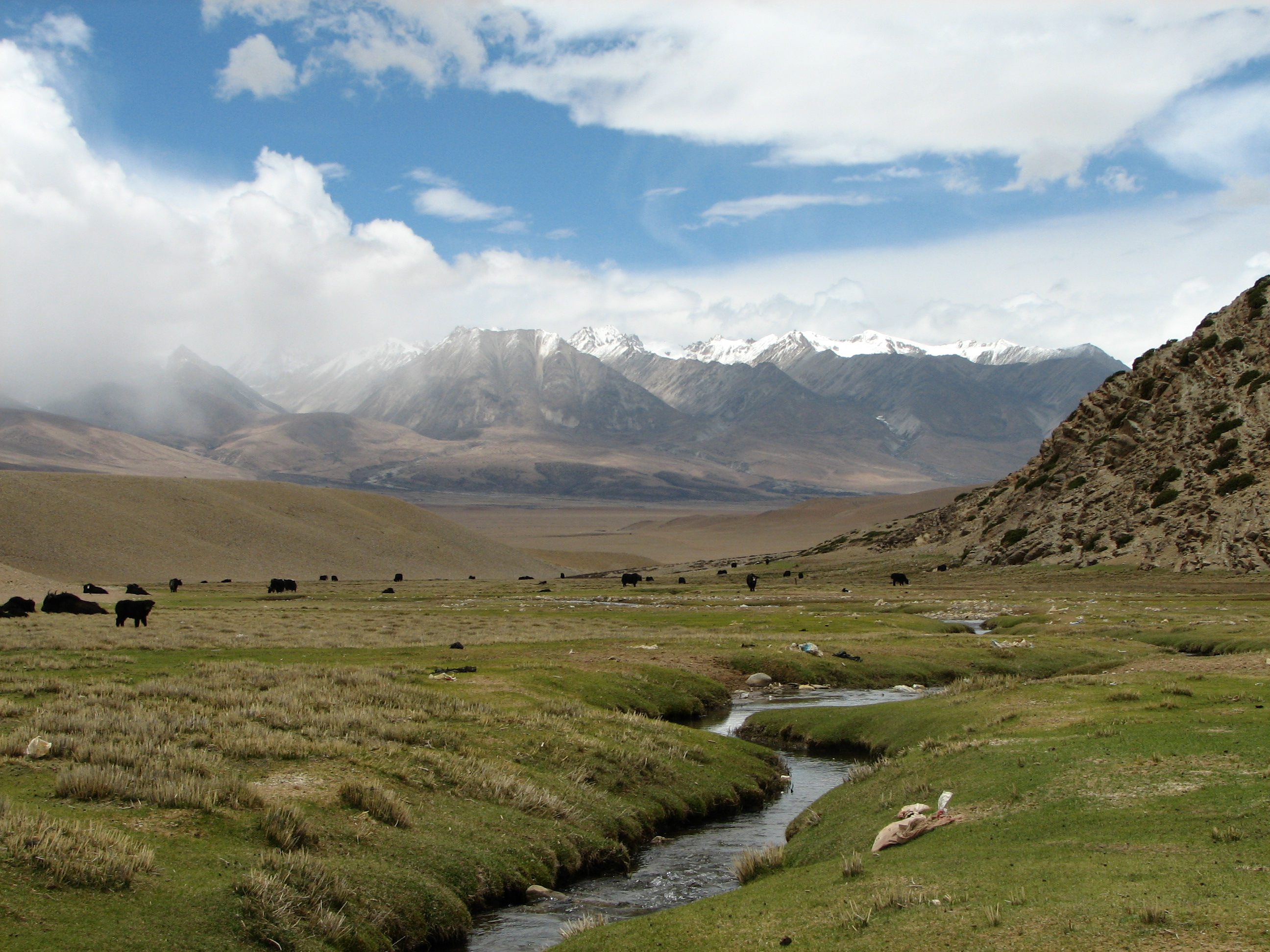
Yangbajain valley to the north of Lhasa

The Tibetan Plateau supports a variety of ecosystems, most of them classified as montane grasslands. While parts of the plateau feature an alpine tundra-like environment, other areas feature monsoon-influenced shrublands and forests. Species diversity is generally reduced on the plateau due to the elevation and low precipitation. The plateau hosts the Tibetan wolf, and species of snow leopard, wild yak, wild ass, cranes, vultures, hawks, geese, snakes, and water buffalo. One notable animal is the high-altitude jumping spider that can live at elevations of over 6,500 metres (21,300 ft).

Ecoregions, as defined by the World Wide Fund for Nature, are as follows:

- The Pamir alpine desert and tundra covers the western end where it transitions to the Pamir Mountains
- The North Tibetan Plateau–Kunlun Mountains alpine desert covers the northwestern limits along the Kunlun Mountains
- The Karakoram–West Tibetan Plateau alpine steppe covers the westernmost parts and Ladakh
- The Northwestern Himalayan alpine shrub and meadows covers the mountains bordering the extreme west
- The Central Tibetan Plateau alpine steppe covers most of the central portions and the eastern Changtang
- The Western Himalayan alpine shrub and meadows covers the southwestern plateau in the Garuda Valley region
- The Qaidam Basin semi-desert located in the Qaidam Basin in the north
- The Qilian Mountains subalpine meadows covering the Qilian Mountains in the northernmost portions
- The Qilian Mountains conifer forests covering parts of the mountain ranges in the northeast
- The Tibetan Plateau alpine shrublands and meadows covering a swath of the central and northeast
- The Yarlung Tsangpo arid steppe in the Yarlung Tsangpo river valley, where most of the permanent human population lives
- The Eastern Himalayan alpine shrub and meadows cover the south on the northern side of the Himalayas

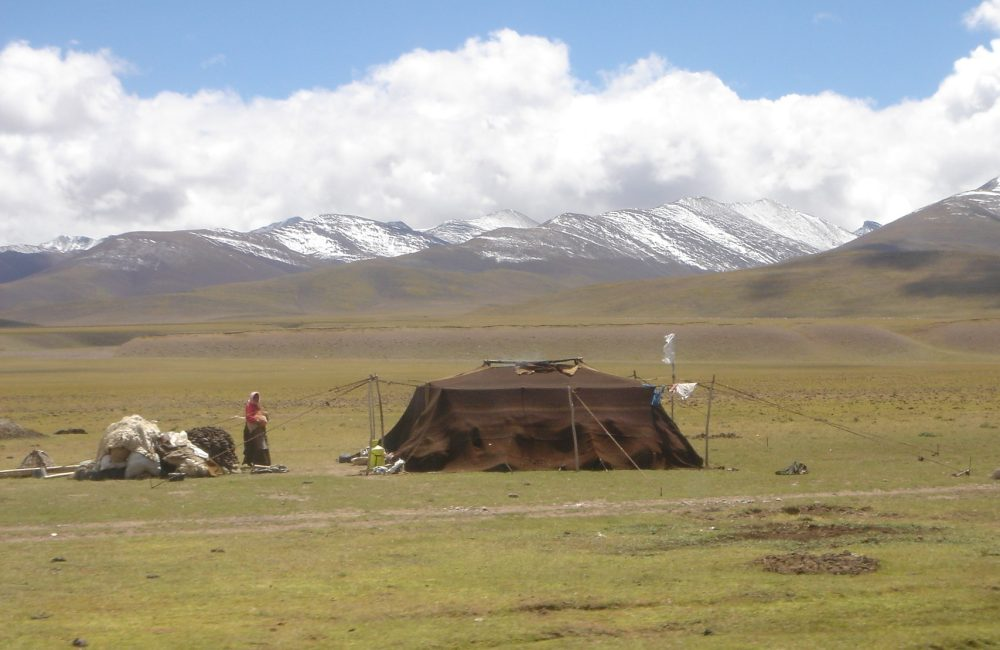
Pastoral nomads camping near Namtso.

- The Southeast Tibet shrub and meadows cover the southeastern and eastern parts of the plateau and are generally rainier than the other high-altitude regions
- The Northeastern Himalayan subalpine conifer forests reach up mountain valleys in the south and contain some of the highest altitude forests in the world
- The Nujiang Lancang Gorge alpine conifer and mixed forests cover the mountain valleys that reach 500 km (310 mi) into the southeast
- The Hengduan Mountains subalpine conifer forests cover the southeasternmost mountain valleys
- The Qionglai–Minshan conifer forests cover the eastern edges

== Human history ==
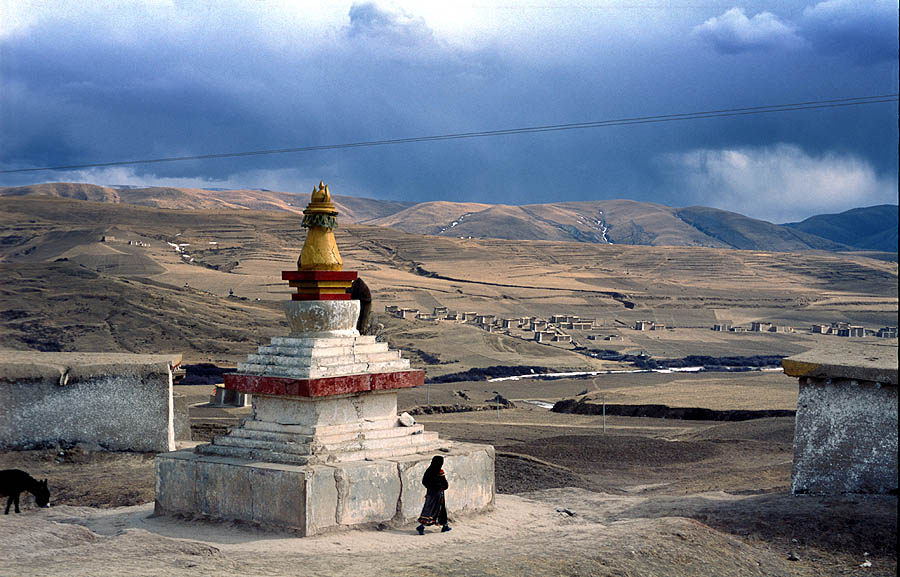
Tibetan Buddhist stupa and houses outside the town of Ngawa, on the Tibetan Plateau.

Archaic Denisovans lived on the plateau from around 200,000 to 40,000 years ago, according to a study published in Nature. Archaeological evidence suggests that the earliest human occupation of the plateau occurred between 30,000 and 40,000 years ago.

Since the plateau's earliest settlement, Tibetan culture has adapted and flourished in the western, southern, and eastern regions. The Changtang is generally too high and cold to support permanent population. The Tibetan Empire existed from the 7th century to the 9th century AD. Nomadic pastoralism, once practiced widely across Asia and Africa, has persisted among these communities on the plateau. Pastoral nomads constitute about 40% of the ethnic Tibetan population. Nomadic peoples have adapted to the plateau's grasslands by raising livestock rather than crops, which are poorly suited to the terrain.

== Impact on other regions ==
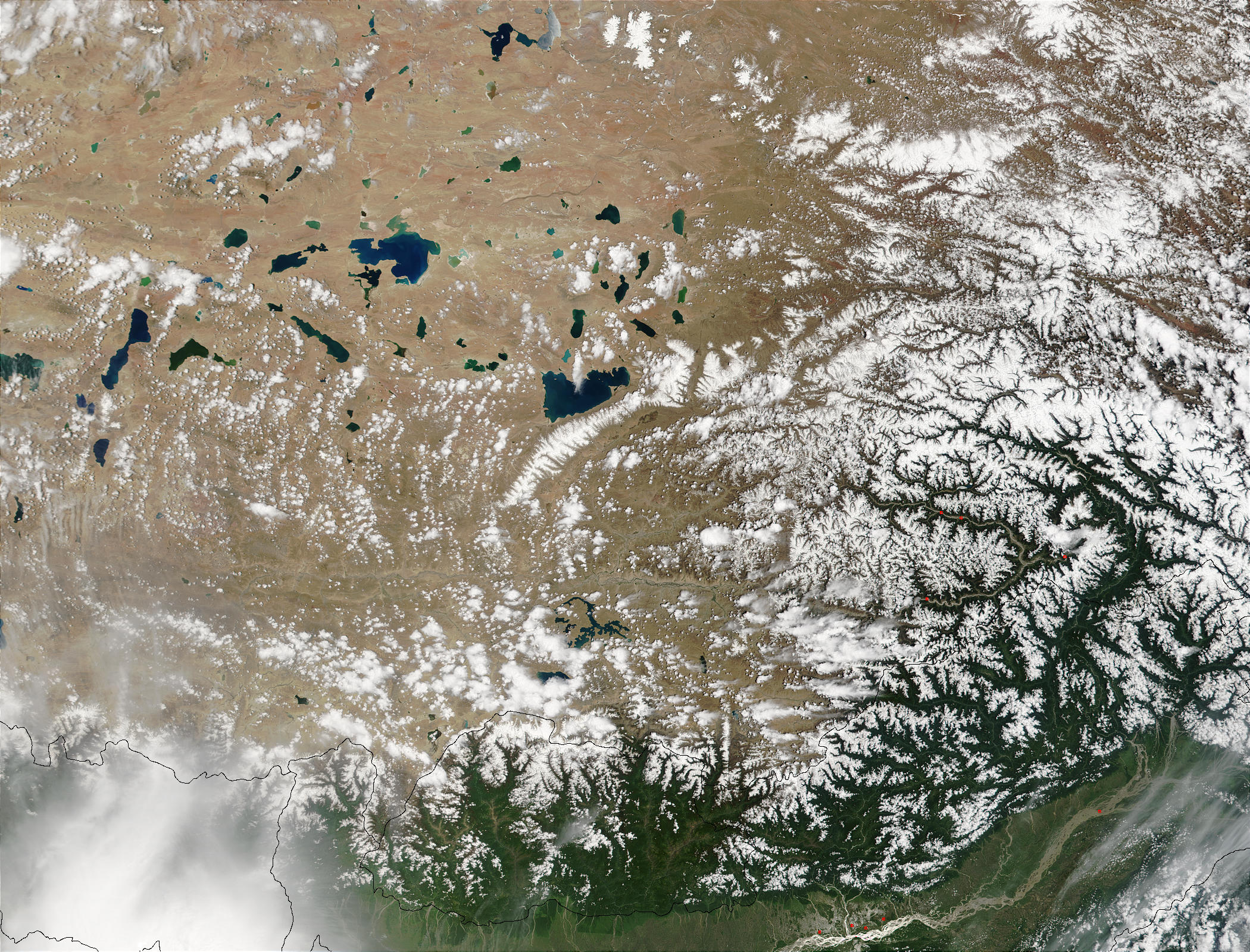
NASA satellite image of the southeastern Tibetan Plateau. The Brahmaputra River is in the lower right.

Monsoons are caused by the different amplitudes of surface temperature seasonal cycles between land and oceans. This differential warming occurs because heating rates differ between land and water. Wind- and buoyancy-generated turbulence distributes ocean heat vertically through a "mixed layer" that may be 50 meters deep, whereas the land surface conducts heat slowly, with the seasonal signal penetrating only a meter or so. The specific heat capacity of liquid water is also significantly greater than that of most materials that make up land.

Together, these factors mean that the heat capacity of the layer participating in the seasonal cycle is much larger over the oceans than over land, with the consequence that the land warms and cools faster than the ocean. In turn, air over the land warms faster and reaches a higher temperature than does air over the ocean. The warmer air over land tends to rise, creating an area of low pressure. The pressure anomaly then causes a steady wind to blow toward the land, carrying moist air from the ocean surface with it, which increases rainfall. This lifting can be driven by a variety of mechanisms, including mountains, surface heating, convergence at the surface, divergence aloft, or storm-produced outflows near the surface. When such lifting occurs, the air cools due to expansion in lower pressure, which in turn produces condensation and precipitation.

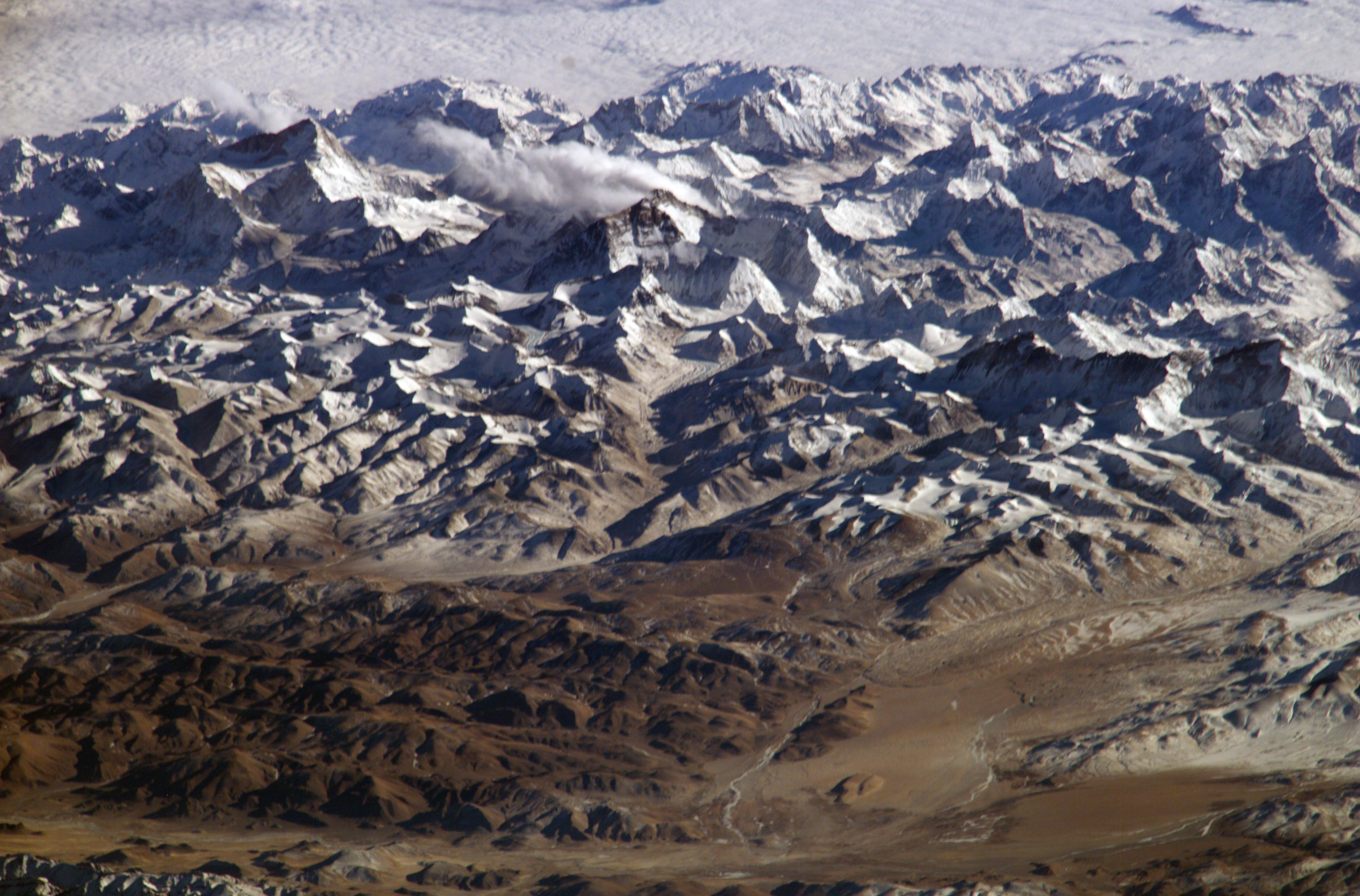
The Himalayas as seen from space looking south from over the Tibetan Plateau.

In winter, the land cools off quickly, but the ocean maintains the heat longer. The hot air over the ocean rises, creating a low-pressure area and a breeze that flows from land to ocean, while a large area of high pressure forms over the increasingly dry, wintertime-cooled land. Monsoons are similar to sea and land breezes, a term usually referring to the localized, diurnal cycle of circulation near coastlines everywhere, but they are much larger in scale, stronger, and seasonal. The seasonal monsoon wind shift and weather associated with the heating and cooling of the Tibetan Plateau is the strongest such monsoon on Earth.

== Glaciers ==
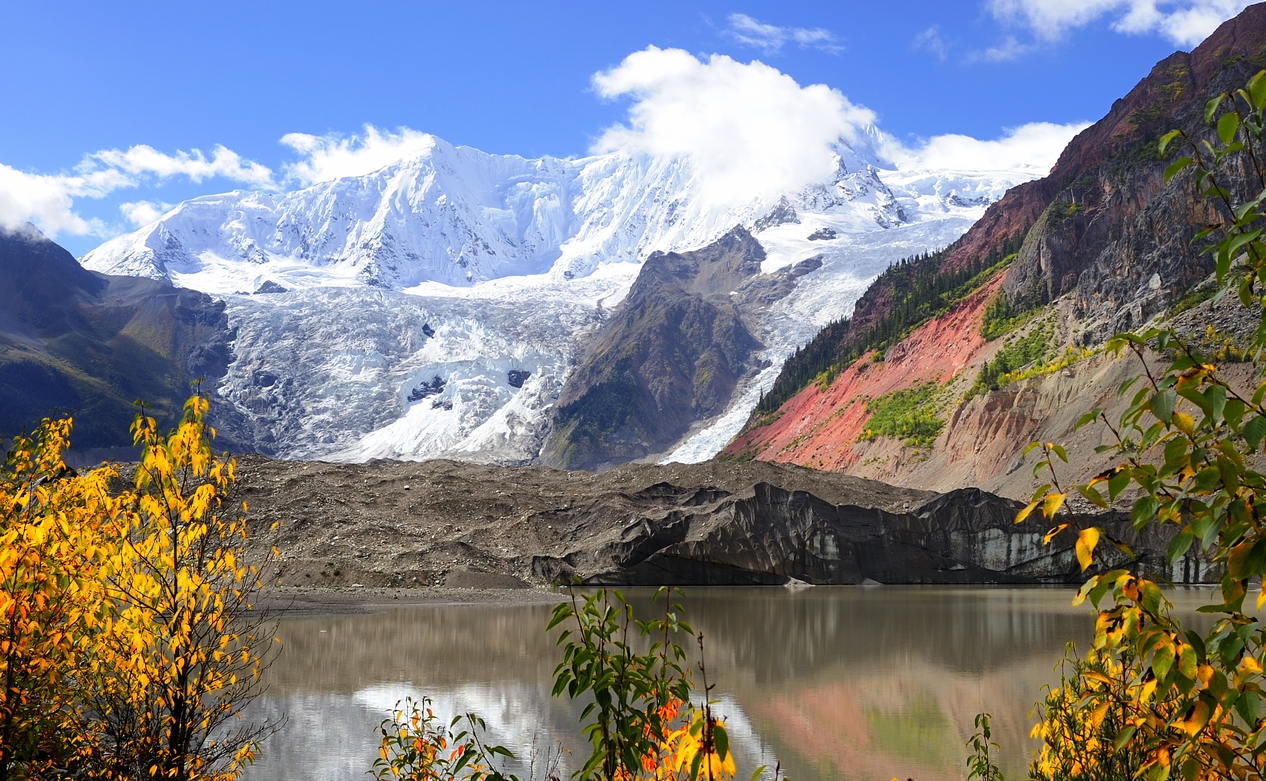
Midui Glacier in Nyingchi

=== Frozen biological samples ===
Ice of the plateau provides a valuable window to the past. In 2015, researchers studying the plateau reached the top of the Guliya glacier, with ice thickness of 310 m (1,020 ft), and drilled to a depth of 50 m (160 ft) in order to recover ice core samples. Owing to the extremely low biomass in the 15,000-year-old samples, researchers took around five years to extract 33 viruses, 28 of which were new to science. None had survived the extraction process. Phylogenetic analysis suggests those viruses had infected plants or other microorganisms.

=== Climate change ===
The Tibetan Plateau contains the world's third-largest store of ice. Qin Dahe, the former head of the China Meteorological Administration, issued the following assessment in 2009:

Temperatures are rising four times faster than elsewhere in China, and the Tibetan glaciers are retreating at a higher speed than in any other part of the world. In the short term, this will cause lakes to expand and bring floods and mudflows. In the long run, the glaciers are vital lifelines for Asian rivers, including the Indus and the Ganges. Once they vanish, water supplies in those regions will be in peril.

The Tibetan Plateau contains the largest area of low-latitude glaciers and is particularly vulnerable to global warming. Over the past five decades, 80% of the glaciers have retreated, losing 4.5% of their combined areal coverage. The region is also liable to suffer damages from permafrost thaw caused by climate change.

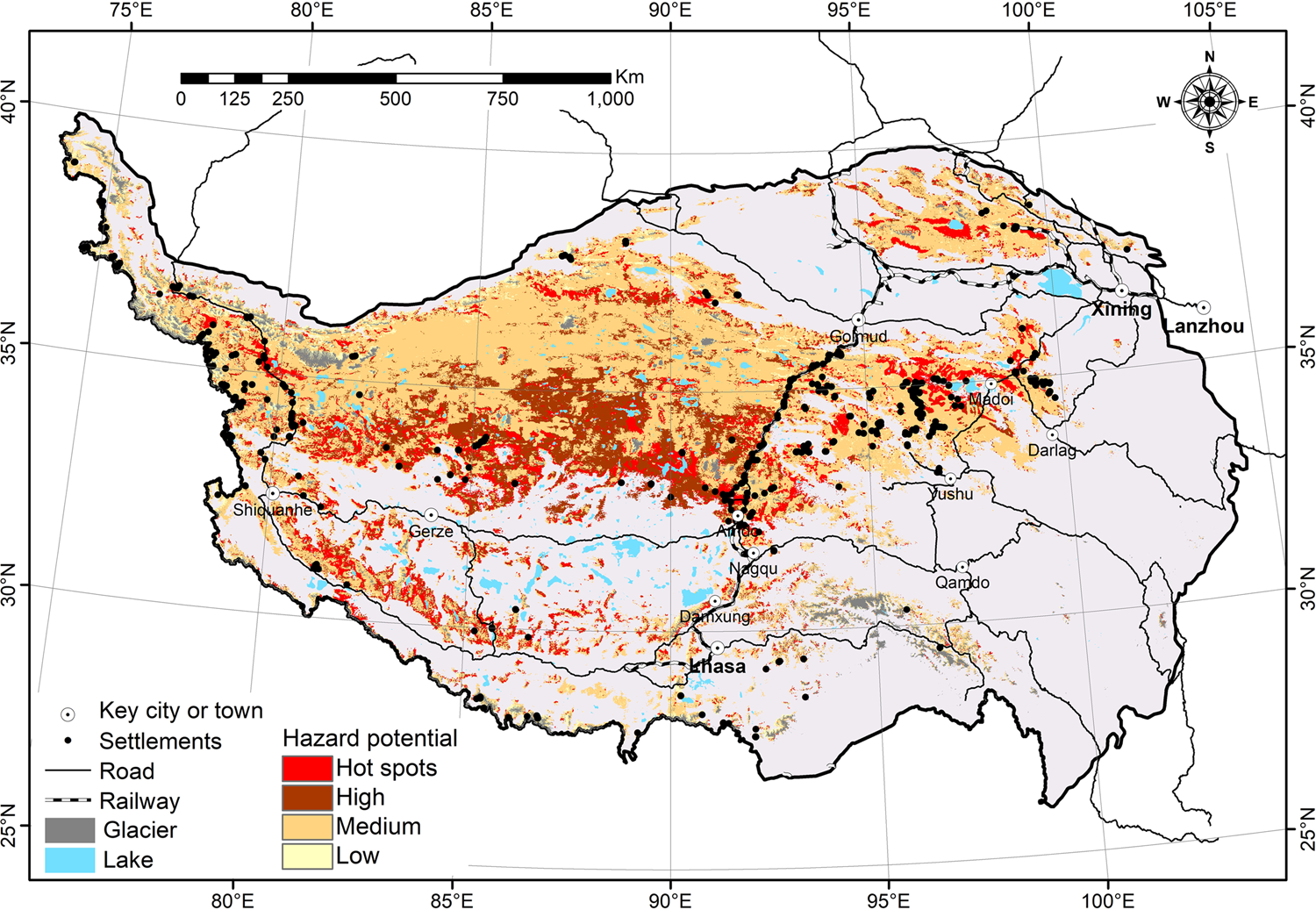
Detailed map of Qinghai–Tibet Plateau infrastructure at risk from permafrost thaw under the SSP2-4.5 scenario.

Outside of the Arctic, Qinghai–Tibet Plateau (sometimes known as "the Third Pole"), also has an extensive permafrost area. It is warming at twice the global average rate, and 40% of it is already considered "warm" permafrost, making it particularly unstable. Qinghai–Tibet Plateau has a population of over 10 million people – double the population of permafrost regions in the Arctic – and over 1 million m^{2} of buildings are located in its permafrost area, as well as 2,631 km of power lines, and 580 km of railways. There are also 9,389 km of roads, and around 30% are already sustaining damage from permafrost thaw. Estimates suggest that under the scenario most similar to today, SSP2-4.5, around 60% of the current infrastructure would be at high risk by 2090 and simply maintaining it would cost $6.31 billion, with adaptation reducing these costs by 20.9% at most. Holding the global warming to 2 °C (3.6 °F) would reduce these costs to $5.65 billion, and fulfilling the optimistic Paris Agreement target of 1.5 °C (2.7 °F) would save a further $1.32 billion. In particular, fewer than 20% of railways would be at high risk by 2100 under 1.5 °C (2.7 °F), yet this increases to 60% at 2 °C (3.6 °F), while under SSP5-8.5, this level of risk is met by mid-century.

== See also ==
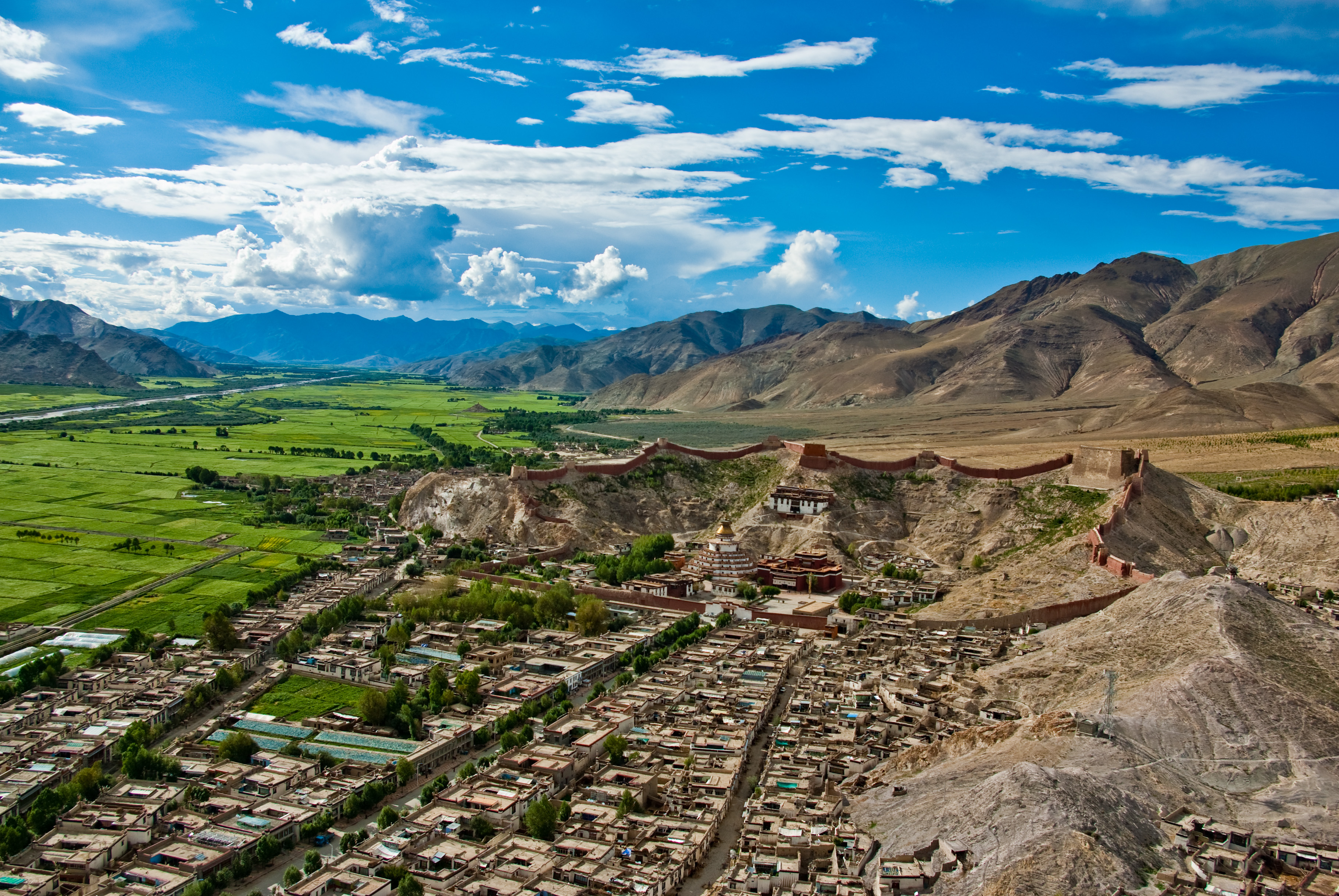
The old town of Gyantse and surrounding fields.

- Annexation of Tibet by the People's Republic of China
- Asian Water Tower, the high-mountain water system centered on the Tibetan Plateau
- Bayan Har block
- Central Tibetan Administration
- Geography of Tibet
- Tibet (1912–1951)
- Tibetan culture
- Tibetan sovereignty debate
- Tibetan diaspora
