= Jiang Gaoming =

Chinese botanist (born 1964)

- 蒋高明
- Born: September 16, 1964 (age 61); Shandong Province, China
- Occupations: Professor and Ph.D. tutor at the Chinese Academy of Sciences’ Institute of Botany
- Spouse: Jianjie Lu

Jiang Gaoming (simplified Chinese: 蒋高明; traditional Chinese: 蔣高明; pinyin: Jiǎng Gāomíng) is a professor and Ph.D. tutor at the Chinese Academy of Sciences’ Institute of Botany.

He is also vice secretary-general of the UNESCO China-MAB (Man and the Biosphere) Committee and a member of the UNESCO MAB Urban Group. He is known for his concepts of “urban vegetation" and allowing damaged ecosystems to recover naturally.

== Career ==
Jiang received his bachelor's degree in Botany at Shandong University in 1985, and his master's degree in Botany at the Institute of Botany Academia Sinica in 1988. He received his Phd in Botany in 1993. He studied at the University of Liverpool from 1991 to 1992.

Jiang has done research on a wealth of topics. These topics include eco-environmental planning for middle-sized cities in China, bioindicating and biomonitoring of air pollution by plants, phosphorus cycling and chemical ecology, the ecology of colliery spoils, and urban vegetation. He initiated the first conference for the Young Chinese Botanists in Beijing 1987, and the first conference on Environment and Plant Resource Exploring in China in Changbaishan in 1988.

Jiang was the first person to chart the pollution history of Chengde in northern China. He was the first to explain why ancient pine trees in gardens were dying. He has also established models for monitoring sulfur dioxide (SO2) pollution in woody plants.

Jiang noted the effects of tourism and urbanization on the Chengde Mountain Resort (also known as the Summer Villa estate), which is the largest existing imperial garden in China.

Jiang Gaoming is married to Jianjie Lu. They have a daughter.

== Works ==
Jiang has published hundreds of articles, papers, and books, a majority of which are in Chinese. His main topics include plant ecology and plant ecophysiology. He publishes articles for chinadialogue, which are available in Chinese and English.

- Fixing the food chain chinadialogue 28 June 2010
- Beware the GM giants chinadialogue 18 January 2010
- Removing chemicals from our food chinadialogue 14 August 2009
- Towards a new energy economy chinadialogue 11 June 2009
- Ensuring food security in China chinadialogue 27 March 2009
- Storing carbon in the fields chinadialogue 25 February 2009
- The high price of developing dams chinadialogue 22 January 2009
- Consumers must say no to additives chinadialogue 26 September 2009
- Cutting emissions in rural China chinadialogue 12 November 2008
- Rush of energy chinadialogue 3 September 2008
- China's evaporating wetlands chinadialogue 28 August 2008
- Letting nature heal itself chinadialogue 18 July 2008
- The countryside is being forgotten chinadialogue 12 June 2008
- To everything there is a season chinadialogue 22 May 2008
- Saving Beijing’s reservoirs chinadialogue 23 April 2008
- Land reclamation: tread carefully chinadialogue 11 March 2008
- Chinese consumers must reject polluted food chinadialogue 5 February 2008
- China’s “green deserts” chinadialogue 8 January 2008
- Waiting for the smoke to clear chinadialogue 17 October 2007
- The problem with cotton chinadialogue 12 September 2007
- Securing our food — and our future chinadialogue 16 August 2007
- The disappearing sand of Yimengshan chinadialogue 7 August 2007
- The truth about dead chickens chinadialogue 14 June 2007
- A sea of plastic chinadialogue 16 May 2007
- Stopping the sandstorms chinadialogue 13 April 2007
- Global warming’s local solutions chinadialogue 15 March 2007
- China must say no to imported waste chinadialogue 8 February 2007
- The new Green Revolution chinadialogue 17 January 2007

== Positions ==
- Invasive Species

In July Jiang asked the government to watch out for invasive species, especially during the Olympic Games. He noted that international meetings are often bothered by invasive species. This could cause biological catastrophes and incur major economic losses. For example, the State Forestry Bureau said last year that there were more than 290 alien species on the mainland, causing estimated losses of 56 billion yuan (HK$63.79 billion) a year.

- Desertification

Jiang is eager to control desertification but he criticizes the government's policy of planting one species of trees. "Ecology is on everyone's lips, but ecology does not mean blindly planting trees," Xinhua News Agency reported Jiang as saying.

Jiang thinks the main cause of desertification in Inner Mongolia is overgrazing. By 2000 some 80% of the grasslands in Hunshandake had deteriorated into desert, and 33% of the land had become mobile sand dunes. In the 1960s mobile sand dunes only made up 2% of the land.[sina] The first attempt to solve desertification involved planting 100,000 yuan (13,000 U.S. dollars) worth of willows, because conventional thought led Jiang to believe trees were the best solution to stop sandstorms.

Later Jiang's team tried a different approach. A 2,670-hectare (6,600-acre) section of grassland in the Bayinhushuo Gacha was fenced off and no grazing was allowed.

The success achieved in Bayinhushuo Gacha quickly spread to the surrounding regions: several gachas followed suit, fencing off grasslands for natural restoration and thereby expanding the protected areas to more than 6500 hectares. Jiang is pleased that a policy of "ecological conservation first, ecological construction second" was included in the Eleventh Five-Year Plan on Ecological Protection.

- Biofuels

Jiang supports burning straw instead of coal as a source of power. He estimated that a biomass power plant of 25,000 kW can generate 100,000 tons less carbon dioxide every year compared with the coal burning power plant of the same capacity. Furthermore, Jiang said that biomasses are less wasteful than coal. Thirty percent of burnt coal is waste while biomass burning generates just two percent and can be used as fertilizer after proper processing.

- Pesticides

Jiang believes that the use of pesticides in Chinese farming can lead to poor quality and even dangerous food. “Farmers adopted certain production methods to make food-production cheaper. They use whichever chemicals are cheapest. The use of pesticide seems better, and it is cheap. In fact, the pesticides they would buy are also used as fertiliser, and this makes it all the more dangerous,” Jiang said.

== See also ==
- Monoculture
- Biodiversity
