= Roof of the World =

Epithet for the mountainous interior of Asia

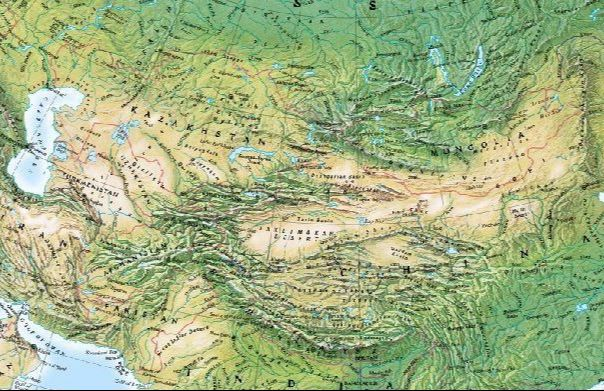
Physical map of Central Asia from the Caspian Sea in the northwest, to Mongolia in the northeast.

The Roof of the World or Top of the World is a metaphoric epithet or phrase used to describe some of the highest regions in the world. The term usually refers to all or part of High-mountain Asia, the continent's mountainous interior, including the Pamirs, the Himalayas, the Tibetan Plateau, the Hindu Kush, the Tian Shan, the country of Nepal, and the Altai Mountains.

== Attested usage ==
The British explorer John Wood, writing in 1838, described Bam-i-Duniah (Roof of the World) as a "native expression" (presumably Wakhi), and it was generally used for the Pamirs in Victorian times: In 1876, another British traveler, Sir Thomas Edward Gordon, employed it as the title of a book and wrote in Chapter IX:

We were now about to cross the famous "Bam-i-Dunya", "The Roof of the World" under which name the elevated region of the hitherto comparatively unknown Pamir tracts had long appeared in our maps. [...] Wood, in 1838, was the first European traveler of modern times to visit the Great Pamir.

Older encyclopedias also used "Roof of the World" to describe the Pamirs:

- Encyclopædia Britannica, 11th ed. (1911): "PAMIRS, a mountainous region of central Asia...the Bam-i-Dunya ('The Roof of the World')".
- The Columbia Encyclopedia, 1942 edition: "the Pamirs (Persian = roof of the world)".
- Hachette, 1890: "Le Toit du monde (Pamir)", French for "Roof of the World (Pamir)".
- Der Große Brockhaus, Leipzig 1928–1935: "Dach der Welt, Bezeichnung für das Hochland von Pamir" (German: "roof of the world, term describing the Pamir highlands"), and (in translation): "Pamir highlands, the nodal point of the mountain systems of Tien-Shan, Kun-lun, Karakoram, the Himalayas and Hindukush, and therefore called the roof of the world."

With the awakening of public interest in Tibet, the Pamirs, "since 1875 ... probably the best explored region in High Asia", went out of the limelight and the description "Roof of the World" has been increasingly applied to Tibet and the Tibetan Plateau, and occasionally, especially in French (toit du monde), even to Mount Everest, but the traditional use is still alive.

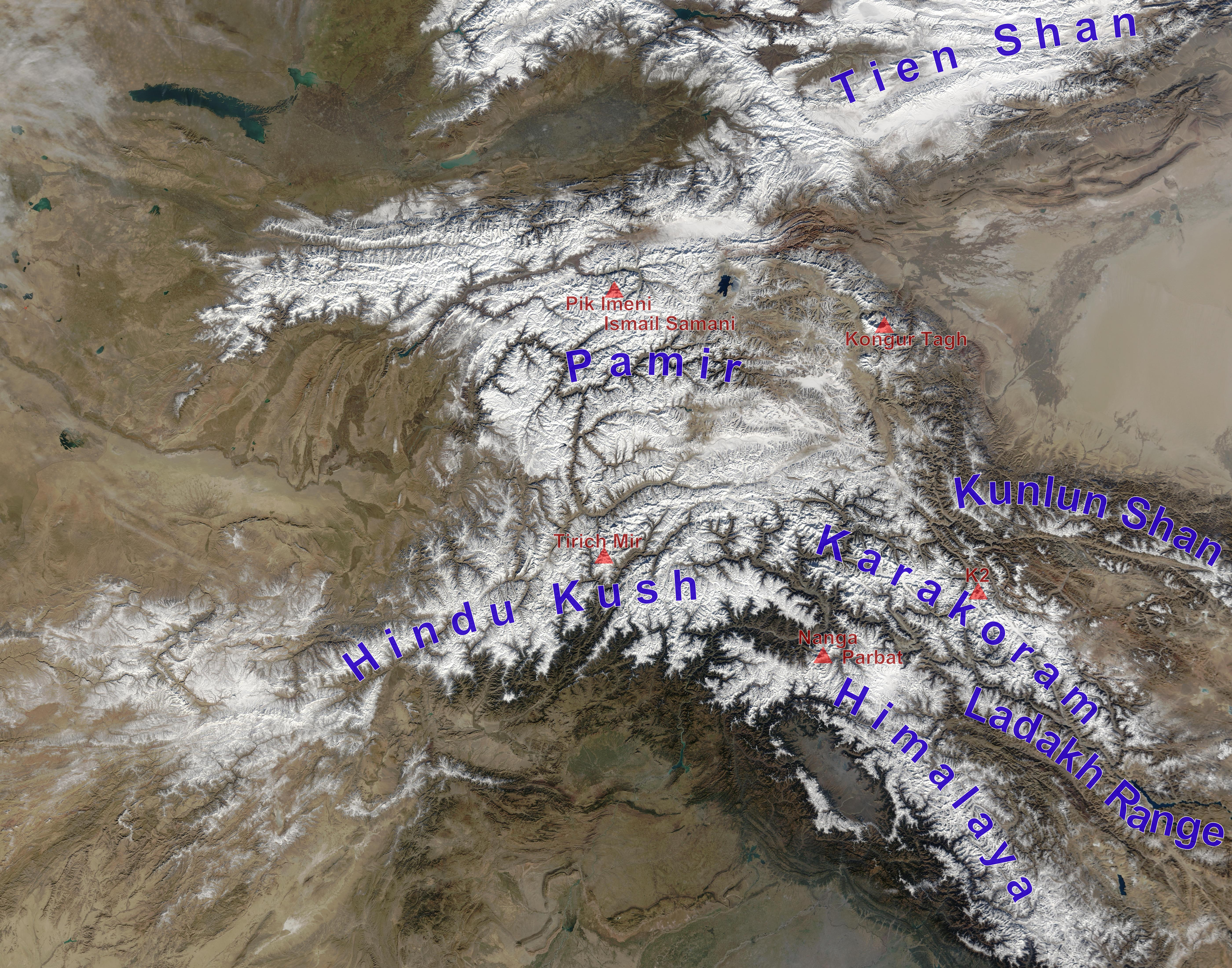
Satellite image of the western part of the Roof of the World: Tian Shan to the north, Pamirs central, the Hindu Kush to the south, Kunlun Shan to the east, and Karakoram, Ladakh Range and Himalayas to the southeast

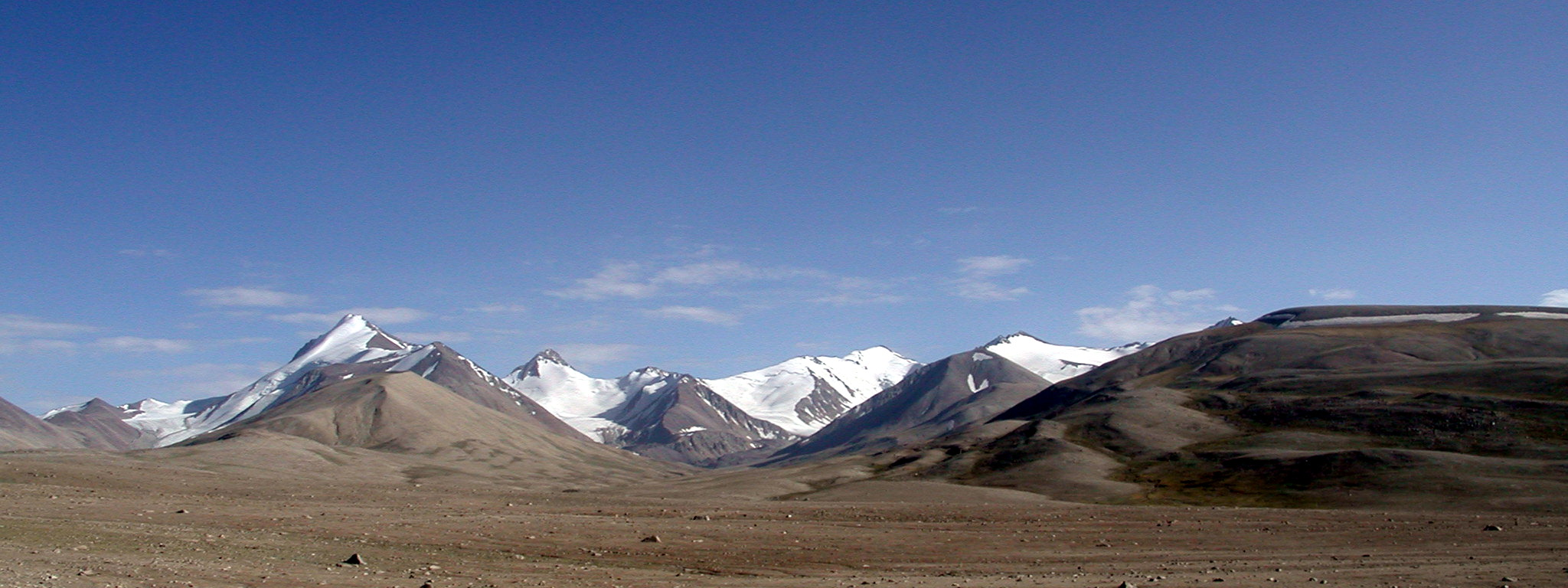
Panorama of the Pamir Mountains

== See also ==
- Four continents
- Seven Seas
- Mount Imeon
- High-mountain Asia
