= Jiang Xuemo =

Chinese economist, translator and professor

- 蒋学模
- Born: March 24, 1918; Guanhaiwei, Cixi, Zhejiang, China
- Died: July 18, 2008 (aged 90); Huadong Hospital, Shanghai, China
- Education: Soochow University; Sichuan University
- Occupations: Economist, translator
- Relatives: Jiang Xuekai (brother)
- Writing career
- Language: Chinese, English
- Notable work: The Count of Monte Cristo

Chinese name
- Traditional Chinese: 蔣學模
- Simplified Chinese: 蒋学模
Transcriptions
Standard Mandarin
- Hanyu Pinyin: Jiǎng Xuémó

Jiang Xuemo (Chinese: 蒋学模; 24 March 1918 – 18 July 2008) was a Chinese economist, translator and professor at Fudan University.

During his 70-year academic career, Jiang has published more than 30 academic monographs, edited more than 10 textbooks and books on political economy, and translated more than 10 literary and economic works. He was the first to translate The Count of Monte Cristo to Chinese. He was a member of the Chinese Communist Party (CCP).

== Biography ==
Jiang was born in Guancheng Town of Cixi County, Zhejiang, on March 24, 1918. In 1936 he was accepted to Soochow University, majoring in economy, where he graduated in 1937, the year the Second Sino-Japanese War broke out. Then he went to Chengdu, capital of southwest China's Sichuan province, and entered Sichuan University. After graduating in 1944, he joined Financial Review as an editor and translator in British Hong Kong. After British Hong Kong was occupied by the Imperial Japanese Army, Jiang's brother Jiang Xuekai was shot and killed by Japanese forces. He came to Chongqing, Jin Kongzhang introduced him to the Finance Research Committee of the Ministry of Finance for compilation. From 1945 to 1949 he worked as an editor and translator at Fudan University in Chongqing. Since 1949, he taught at Fudan University as Associate Professor and full Professor. He died of illness at Huadong Hospital in Shanghai, on July 18, 2008.

== Translations ==
- The Count of Monte Cristo (基督山伯爵)

== Works ==
- Textbooks on Political Economics (政治经济学教材)
