= Tihao Chiang =

Tihao Chiang is an electrical engineer working for Ambarella Taiwan, Ltd., in Hsinchu, Taiwan.

Chiang was named a Fellow of the Institute of Electrical and Electronics Engineers (IEEE) in 2014 for his contributions to the theory and applications of video coding algorithms.
