= Third Pole =

Mountainous region near the Tibetan Plateau

The Third Pole, also known as the Hindu Kush-Karakoram-Himalayan system (HKKH), is a mountainous region located in the west and south of the Tibetan Plateau. Part of High-mountain Asia, it spreads over an area of more than 4.2 million square kilometres (1.6 million square miles) across nine countries, i.e. Afghanistan, Bangladesh, Bhutan, China, India, Myanmar, Nepal, Pakistan and Tajikistan, bordering ten countries. The area is nicknamed the "Third Pole" because its mountain glaciers and snowfields store more frozen water than anywhere else in the world after the Arctic and Antarctic polar caps. With the world's loftiest mountains, comprising all 14 peaks above 8,000 metres (26,000 ft), it is the source of 10 major rivers and forms a global ecological buffer.

The Third Pole area is rich with natural resources and consists of all or some of four global biodiversity hotspots. The mountain resources administer a wide range of ecosystem benefits and are the base for the drinking water, food production and livelihoods of the 220 million inhabitants of the region, as well as indirectly to the 1.5 billion people — one sixth of the world's population — living in the downstream river basins. Billions of people benefit from the food and energy produced in these river basins whose headwaters rely on meltwaters and precipitations that run off these mountains.

== Third Pole and climate change ==
Climate change is now a key concern in the Third Pole. Mountain set-ups are especially sensitive to climate change and the Third Pole area is inhabited by a populace most susceptible to these global alterations. Modifications in the river systems have had a direct impact on the contentment of a multitude of people. The rate of warming in the Third Pole is considerably greater than the global average, and the rate is increased at an elevated altitude, indicating a greater susceptibility of the cryosphere environment to climate change. This trend is expected to continue. Climate change projections suggest that all areas of South Asia are likely to warm by at least 1 °C by the turn of the century, while in some areas the warming could be as much as 3.5 to 4 °C. The lives and livelihoods of those living in the Third Pole region are challenged by climate change, and the security and development of the region impacted by the Third Pole are in peril. This will have ramifications for the entire continent, and indeed the effects will be felt worldwide. However, there is insufficient awareness of this risk and its potential knock-on effects outside of the impacted region; a special effort is required to increase the attention given to the fragility of the mountain social-ecological set-up.

== Efforts for monitoring climate change and its impacts ==
World Meteorological Organization (WMO) has planned to set up a network of regional climate centers in this region and named this as TP-RCC Network. A "Scoping Meeting on the Implementation of Third Pole Regional Climate Centres Network" was held from 27 March to 28 March 2018 at the WMO Headquarters Office in Geneva, Switzerland. In this meeting, it was decided that China, India and Pakistan will be the leading nodes for this network. Another meeting, "Implementation Planning Meeting of the Third Pole Regional Climate Centre Network", was also conducted from 13 December to 14 December 2018 in Beijing, China.

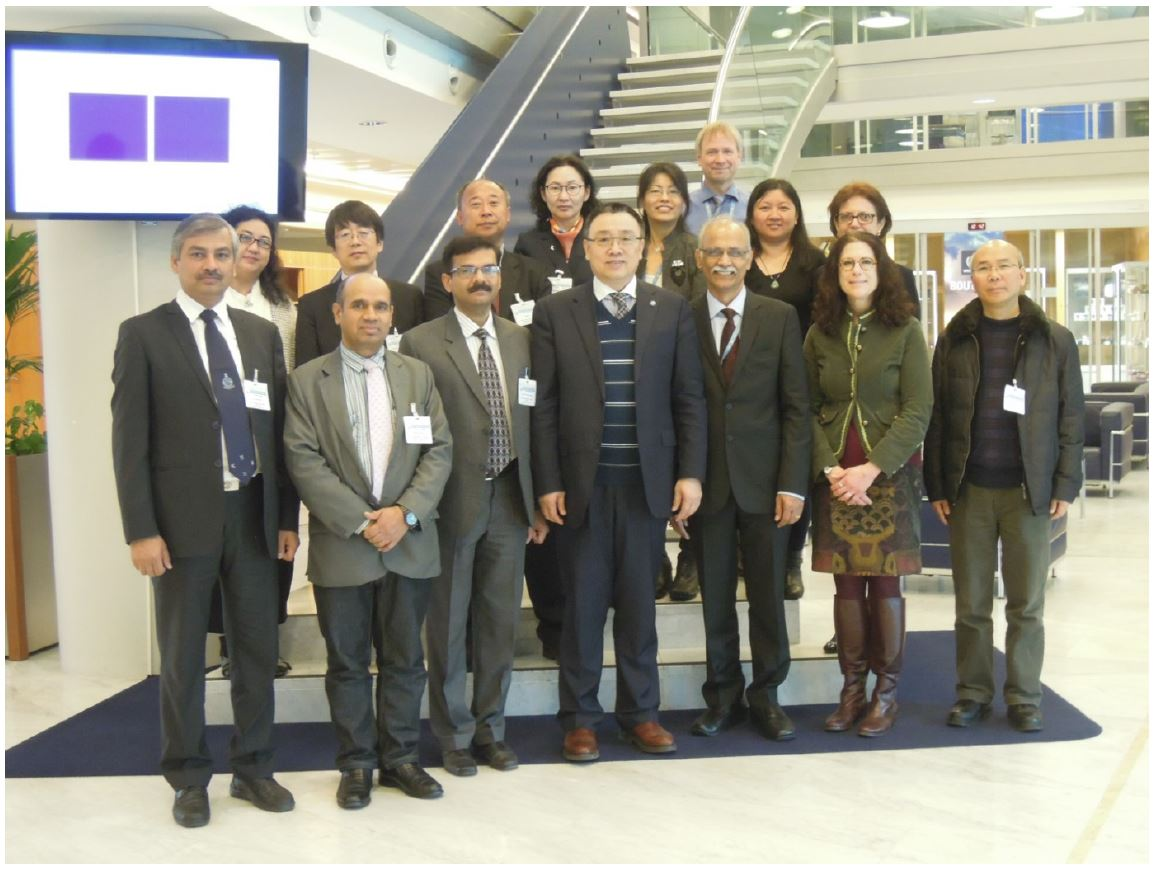
TP-RCC Network Establishing Group at WMO HQ Geneva Switzerland

An international scientific programme called the Third Pole Environment or TPE has set up 11 ground stations and tethered balloons since 2014, working with the Institute of Tibetan Plateau Research, Chinese Academy of Sciences, in Beijing. This monitoring network is already larger than similar efforts in Antarctica and the Arctic and almost doubles the number of such stations around the world.

Another proposed programme named "Enhancing Climate Resilience in the Third Pole" by the Green Climate Fund (GCF) seeks to strengthen the use of weather, water and climate services in the Third Pole region to adapt to climate variability and change and to apply well-informed risk management approaches and will be implemented under the umbrella of the Global Framework for Climate Services (GFCS). The proposed programme reflects the recommendations stemming from the “Regional Consultation on Climate Services for the Third Pole and other High Mountain Regions 2" that was held on 9–11 March 2016 in Jaipur, India. The consultation brought together experts from the NMHSs and key decision-makers and practitioners from the five priority areas of the GFCS (agriculture and food security, energy, health, water and disaster risk reduction). The programme's objectives will be achieved by strengthening regional support networks and institutional capacities, and developing tools and products that are needed for anticipating climate variability and change. The primary measurable benefits include approximately 260 million direct and 1.3 billion indirect beneficiaries from the region who will gain access to critical weather and climate information, which will result in reduced disaster risk, improved water resources management and improved agricultural productivity. The regional component is complemented by a continuum of synergistic national components in each of the countries within the Third Pole region. The activities that will be implemented at the national level will demonstrate the value of effective application/integration of the enhanced capacity at the regional level that will result in improved agricultural production, reduced disaster risk and improved water management in the Least Developed Countries (LDCs) in the Third Pole (Afghanistan, Bangladesh, Bhutan, Nepal and Myanmar). The programme is aligned with the Intended Nationally Determined Contributions (INDCs) of LDCs in the Third Pole (Afghanistan, Bangladesh, Bhutan, Nepal and Myanmar) which places agriculture followed by disaster risk reduction and water as top priority sector for adaptation actions. The Programme has three main objectives:

1. Enhance climate information services to better anticipate the effects of climate change on the cryosphere for vulnerability and adaptation assessment and planning;
2. Improve early warning for extreme weather/climate events (i.e. heatwaves, droughts, GLOFs, landslides, etc.) to reduce the impacts of disasters on human lives and livelihoods;
3. Strengthen the provision and use of weather and climate services for agricultural risk management and water management.

A comprehensive inventory of glaciers and glacial lakes in the Pakistani part of the Third Pole has been completed.

== See also ==
- Asian Water Tower, the high-mountain water-storage and distribution system associated with the region
