= Dialogue Earth =

- Formation: 3 July 2006
- Type: Non-governmental organization
- Purpose: Environmentalism
- Headquarters: London
- Key people: Isabel Hilton, Founder, Sam Geall, CEO
- Website: dialogue.earth
- Formerly called: China Dialogue

Dialogue Earth, formerly China Dialogue (中外对话), is an independent, non-profit organisation based in London. It was founded on July 3, 2006 by British journalist Isabel Hilton. Dialogue Earth is funded by a range of institutional supporters, including the David and Lucile Packard Foundation and the Sigrid Rausing Trust.

It focuses on the environment, especially in China, although it has an interest in environment and sustainability issues around the world.

Dialogue Earth formerly operated China Dialogue; The Third Pole, which reported on the Himalayan watershed; Diálogo Chino, on the Chinese relationship with Latin America; and China Dialogue Ocean.

== History ==
Dialogue Earth was started in 2006 as China Dialogue.

In 2007, Isabel Hilton published an interview in the organisation's website with former US vice-president Al Gore on the issue of climate change.

In 2011, China Dialogue played a significant role in public discourse about air pollution in Beijing, after publishing a report comparing official air pollution figures with figures published by the US embassy in Beijing; the public discussions led to a change in policy by the Chinese environmental ministry.

Increasing restrictions on journalism in China have brought challenges for the organization. It closed its Beijing office in 2022. It was renamed as Dialogue Earth in April 2024.

== Reception ==
Journalism professor Zhong Zhang of the University of Sheffield sees Dialogue Earth as unusual among news sources in China, both in the independence of its reporting and in its public service goals, as opposed to partisan or commercial goals.

== Board members ==
The executive board is chaired by Alexander Benet Northcote.
