= Jiang Xiaowan =

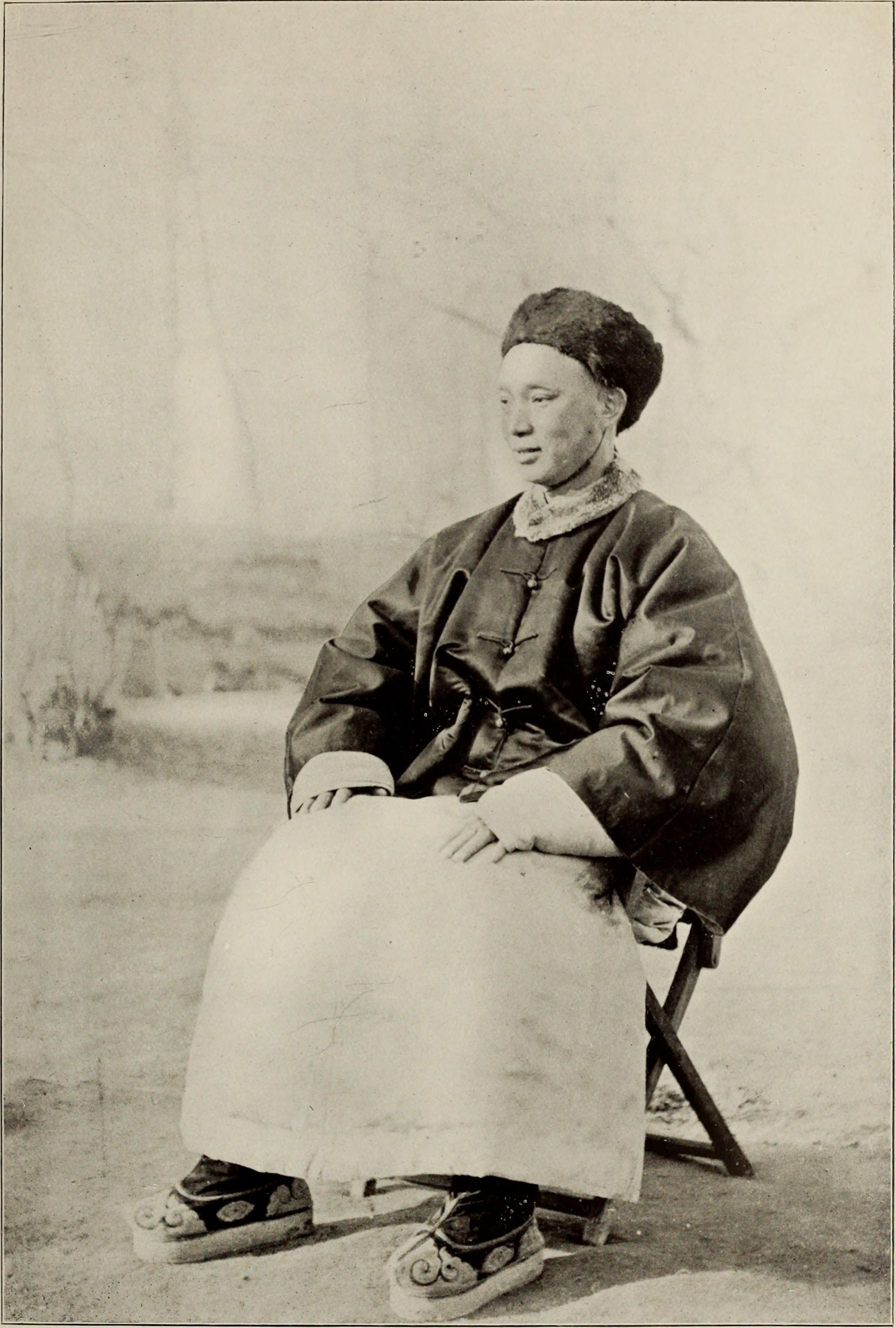
- Photoed by Aurel Stein in his publication
- Born: 蒋孝琬; Hunan
- Died: 1922

Jiang Xiaowan was the interpreter who accompanied Aurel Stein on his expedition to Dunhuang in 1907 and enabled Stein to secure the purchase of ancient manuscripts, including the Diamond Sutra, the world's oldest dated printed text.

== Name ==
Jiang Xiaowan
- Traditional Chinese: 蔣孝琬
- Simplified Chinese: 蒋孝琬
Transcriptions
Standard Mandarin
- Hanyu Pinyin: jiǎng xiàowǎn
- Wade–Giles: chiang3 hsiao4wan3

Title
- Traditional Chinese: 蔣師爺
- Simplified Chinese: 蒋师爷
- Literal meaning: Lawyer Jiang
Transcriptions
Standard Mandarin
- Hanyu Pinyin: jiǎng shīyé (historically: jiǎng sīyé)
- Wade–Giles: chiang3 shih1-yeh2 (historically: chiang3 ssu1-yeh2)

Jiang Xiaowan was his given name. His courtesy name according to Aurel Stein was Chiang Yin-Ma; however the Chinese characters of this name was not recorded.

Jiang was more often referred to as Chiang Ssu-Yeh (Wade–Giles) or Jiang Siye (Pinyin), which was likely the mistranscription of Chinese: 蔣師爺; lit. 'Lawyer Jiang'. Ssu-yeh was a title at the time indicating the person had learned traditional Chinese law.

== See also ==
- Turning the Pages - the Diamond Sutra at the British Library (broadband or dial-up )
