= Ecological engineering =

Environmental engineering

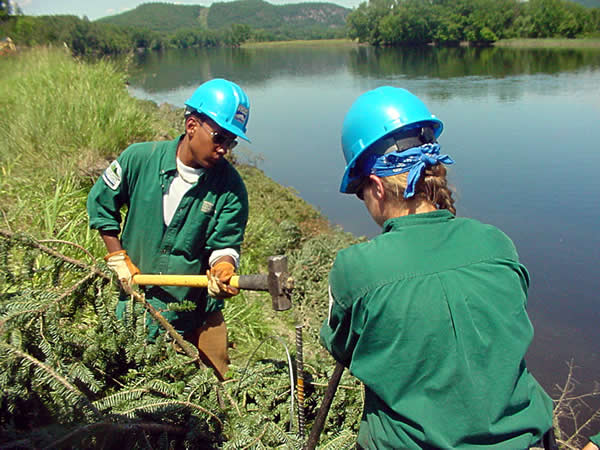
River restoration to restore ecosystem services is one common application of ecological engineering

Ecological engineering uses ecology and engineering to predict, design, construct or restore, and manage ecosystems that integrate "human society with its natural environment for the benefit of both".

== Origins, key concepts, definitions, and applications ==
Ecological engineering emerged as a new idea in the early 1960s, but its definition has taken several decades to refine. Its implementation is still undergoing adjustment, and its broader recognition as a new paradigm is relatively recent. Ecological engineering was introduced by Howard Odum and others as utilizing natural energy sources as the predominant input to manipulate and control environmental systems. The origins of ecological engineering are in Odum's work with ecological modeling and ecosystem simulation to capture holistic macro-patterns of energy and material flows affecting the efficient use of resources.

Mitsch and Jorgensen summarized five basic concepts that differentiate ecological engineering from other approaches to addressing problems to benefit society and nature: 1) it is based on the self-designing capacity of ecosystems; 2) it can be the field (or acid) test of ecological theories; 3) it relies on system approaches; 4) it conserves non-renewable energy sources; and 5) it supports ecosystem and biological conservation.

Mitsch and Jorgensen were the first to define ecological engineering as designing societal services such that they benefit society and nature, and later noted the design should be systems based, sustainable, and integrate society with its natural environment.

Bergen et al. defined ecological engineering as: 1) utilizing ecological science and theory; 2) applying to all types of ecosystems; 3) adapting engineering design methods; and 4) acknowledging a guiding value system.

Barrett (1999) offers a more literal definition of the term: "the design, construction, operation and management (that is, engineering) of landscape/aquatic structures and associated plant and animal communities (that is, ecosystems) to benefit humanity and, often, nature." Barrett continues: "other terms with equivalent or similar meanings include ecotechnology and two terms most often used in the erosion control field: soil bioengineering and biotechnical engineering. However, ecological engineering should not be confused with 'biotechnology' when describing genetic engineering at the cellular level, or 'bioengineering' meaning construction of artificial body parts."

The applications in ecological engineering can be classified into 3 spatial scales: 1) mesocosms (~0.1 to hundreds of meters); 2) ecosystems (~one to tens of km); and 3) regional systems (>tens of km). The complexity of the design likely increases with the spatial scale. Applications are increasing in breadth and depth, and likely impacting the field's definition, as more opportunities to design and use ecosystems as interfaces between society and nature are explored. Implementation of ecological engineering has focused on the creation or restoration of ecosystems, from degraded wetlands to multi-celled tubs and greenhouses that integrate microbial, fish, and plant services to process human wastewater into products such as fertilizers, flowers, and drinking water. Applications of ecological engineering in cities have emerged from collaboration with other fields such as landscape architecture, urban planning, and urban horticulture, to address human health and biodiversity, as targeted by the UN Sustainable Development Goals, with holistic projects such as stormwater management. Applications of ecological engineering in rural landscapes have included wetland treatment and community reforestation through traditional ecological knowledge. Permaculture is an example of broader applications that have emerged as distinct disciplines from ecological engineering, where David Holmgren cites the influence of Howard Odum in development of permaculture.

== Design guidelines, functional classes, and design principles ==
Ecological engineering design will combine systems ecology with the process of engineering design. Engineering design typically involves problem formulation (goal), problem analysis (constraints), alternative solutions search, decision among alternatives, and specification of a complete solution. A temporal design framework is provided by Matlock et al., stating the design solutions are considered in ecological time. In selecting between alternatives, the design should incorporate ecological economics in design evaluation and acknowledge a guiding value system which promotes biological conservation, benefiting society and nature.

Ecological engineering utilizes systems ecology with engineering design to obtain a holistic view of the interactions within and between society and nature. Ecosystem simulation with Energy Systems Language (also known as energy circuit language or energese) by Howard Odum is one illustration of this systems ecology approach. This holistic model development and simulation defines the system of interest, identifies the system's boundary, and diagrams how energy and material moves into, within, and out of, a system in order to identify how to use renewable resources through ecosystem processes and increase sustainability. The system it describes is a collection (i.e., group) of components (i.e., parts), connected by some type of interaction or interrelationship, that collectively responds to some stimulus or demand and fulfills some specific purpose or function. By understanding systems ecology the ecological engineer can more efficiently design with ecosystem components and processes within the design, utilize renewable energy and resources, and increase sustainability.

Mitsch and Jorgensen identified five Functional Classes for ecological engineering designs:

1. Ecosystem utilized to reduce/solve pollution problem. Example: phytoremediation, wastewater wetland, and bioretention of stormwater to filter excess nutrients and metals pollution
2. Ecosystem imitated or copied to address resource problem. Example: forest restoration, replacement wetlands, and installing street side rain gardens to extend canopy cover to optimize residential and urban cooling
3. Ecosystem recovered after disturbance. Example: mine land restoration, lake restoration, and channel aquatic restoration with mature riparian corridors
4. Ecosystem modified in ecologically sound way. Example: selective timber harvest, biomanipulation, and introduction of predator fish to reduce planktivorous fish, increase zooplankton, consume algae or phytoplankton, and clarify the water.
5. Ecosystems used for benefit without destroying balance. Example: sustainable agro-ecosystems, multispecies aquaculture, and introducing agroforestry plots into residential property to generate primary production at multiple vertical levels.

Mitsch and Jorgensen identified 19 Design Principles for ecological engineering, yet not all are expected to contribute to any single design:

1. Ecosystem structure & function are determined by forcing functions of the system;
2. Energy inputs to the ecosystems and available storage of the ecosystem is limited;
3. Ecosystems are open and dissipative systems (not thermodynamic balance of energy, matter, entropy, but spontaneous appearance of complex, chaotic structure);
4. Attention to a limited number of governing/controlling factors is most strategic in preventing pollution or restoring ecosystems;
5. Ecosystem have some homeostatic capability that results in smoothing out and depressing the effects of strongly variable inputs;
6. Match recycling pathways to the rates of ecosystems and reduce pollution effects;
7. Design for pulsing systems wherever possible;
8. Ecosystems are self-designing systems;
9. Processes of ecosystems have characteristic time and space scales that should be accounted for in environmental management;
10. Biodiversity should be championed to maintain an ecosystem's self design capacity;
11. Ecotones, transition zones, are as important for ecosystems as membranes for cells;
12. Coupling between ecosystems should be utilized wherever possible;
13. The components of an ecosystem are interconnected, interrelated, and form a network; consider direct as well as indirect efforts of ecosystem development;
14. An ecosystem has a history of development;
15. Ecosystems and species are most vulnerable at their geographical edges;
16. Ecosystems are hierarchical systems and are parts of a larger landscape;
17. Physical and biological processes are interactive, it is important to know both physical and biological interactions and to interpret them properly;
18. Eco-technology requires a holistic approach that integrates all interacting parts and processes as far as possible;
19. Information in ecosystems is stored in structures.

Mitsch and Jorgensen identified the following considerations prior implementing an ecological engineering design:

- Create conceptual model of determine the parts of nature connected to the project;
- Implement a computer model to simulate the impacts and uncertainty of the project;
- Optimize the project to reduce uncertainty and increase beneficial impacts.

== Relationship to other engineering disciplines ==
The field of Ecological Engineering is closely related to the fields of environmental engineering and civil engineering. The three broadly overlap in the area of water resources engineering, particularly the treatment and management of stormwater and wastewater. While the three disciplines of engineering are closely related to one another, there are distinct areas of expertise within each field.

Ecological engineering is primarily focused on the natural environment and natural infrastructure, emphasizing the mediation of the relationship between people and planet. In complementary disciplines, civil engineering is primarily focused on built infrastructure and public works while environmental engineering focuses on the protection of public and environmental health through the treatment and management of waste streams.

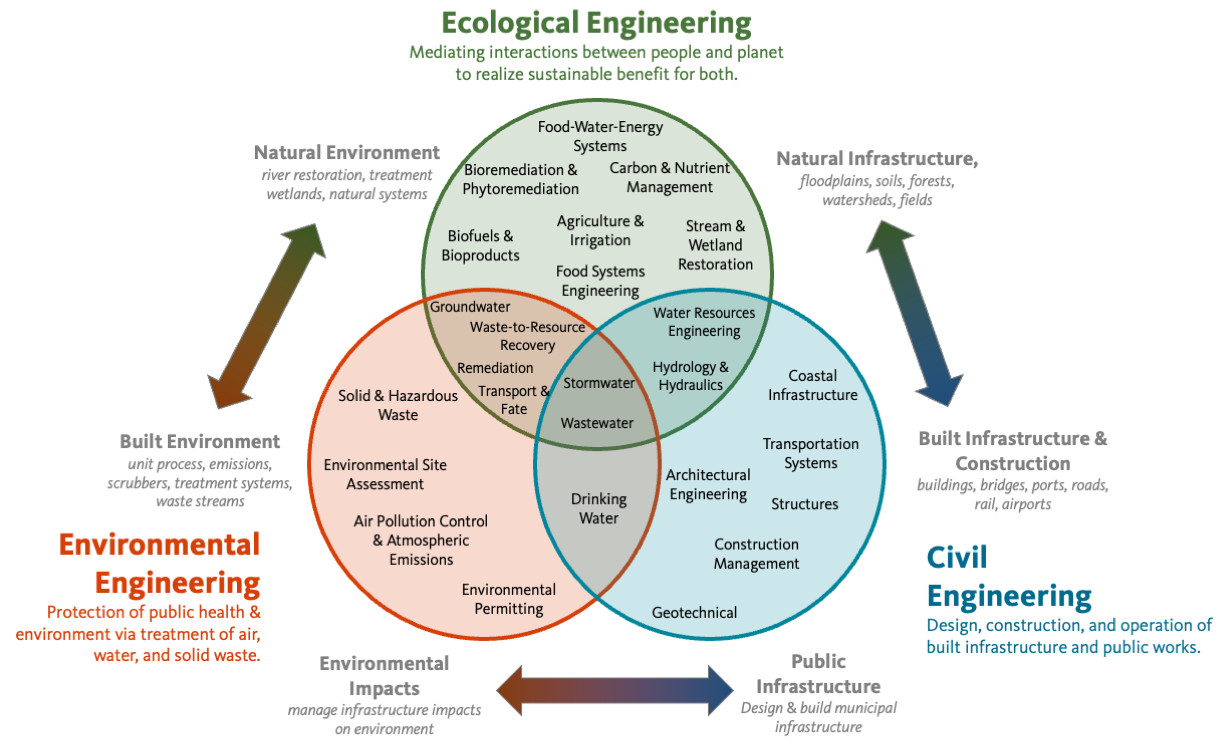
Relationship between ecological, environmental, and civil engineering.

== Academic curriculum (colleges) ==
An academic curriculum was proposed for ecological engineering in 2001. Key elements of the suggested curriculum are: environmental engineering; systems ecology; restoration ecology; ecological modeling; quantitative ecology; economics of ecological engineering, and technical electives. Complementing this set of courses were prerequisites courses in physical, biological, and chemical subject areas, and integrated design experiences. According to Matlock et al., the design should identify constraints, characterize solutions in ecological time, and incorporate ecological economics in design evaluation. Economics of ecological engineering has been demonstrated using energy principles for a wetland., and using nutrient valuation for a dairy farm. With these principals in mind, the world's first B.S. Ecological Engineering program was formalized in 2009 at Oregon State University.

In 2024, the US Accreditation Board for Engineering and Technology, Inc. (ABET) published criteria for accreditation of Ecological Engineering program for the first time. To be accredited, B.S. Ecological Engineering programs must include:

- mathematics through differential equations, probability and statistics, calculus-based physics, and college-level chemistry;
- earth science, fluid mechanics, hydraulics, and hydrology.
- biological and advanced ecological sciences that focus on multi-organism self-sustaining systems at a range of scales, systems ecology, ecosystem services, and ecological modeling;
- material and energy balances; fate and transport of substances in and between air, water, and soil; thermodynamics of living systems; and
- applications of ecological principles to engineering design that include considerations of climate, species diversity, self-organization, uncertainty, sustainability, resilience, interactions between ecological and social systems, and system-scale impacts and benefits.

== See also ==
- Afforestation
- Agroecology
- Agroforestry
- Analog forestry
- Biomass (ecology)
- Buffer strip
- Constructed wetland
- Energy-efficient landscaping
- Environmental engineering
- Forest farming
- Forest gardening
- Great Green Wall
- Great Plains Shelterbelt (1934- )
- Great Plan for the Transformation of Nature - an example of applied ecological engineering in the 1940s and 1950s
- Hedgerow
- Home gardens
- Human ecology
- Macro-engineering
- Sand fence
- Seawater greenhouse
- Sustainable agriculture
- Terra preta
- Three-North Shelter Forest Program
- Wildcrafting
- Windbreak

== Literature ==
- Howard T. Odum (1963), "Man and Ecosystem" Proceedings, Lockwood Conference on the Suburban Forest and Ecology, in: Bulletin Connecticut Agric. Station.
- W.J. Mitsch and S.E. Jørgensen (1989). Ecological Engineering: An Introduction to Ecotechnology. New York: John Wiley and Sons.
- W.J. Mitsch (1993), Ecological engineering—"a cooperative role with the planetary life–support systems. Environmental Science & Technology 27:438-445.
- K. R. Barrett (1999). "Ecological engineering in water resources: The benefits of collaborating with nature". Water International. 24: 182–188. doi:10.1080/02508069908692160.
- P.C. Kangas (2004). Ecological Engineering: Principles and Practice. Boca Raton, Florida: Lewis Publishers, CRC Press. ISBN 978-1566705998.
- W.J. Mitsch and S.E. Jørgensen (2004). Ecological Engineering and Ecosystem Restoration. New York: John Wiley and Sons. ISBN 978-0471332640.
- H.D. van Bohemen (2004), Ecological Engineering and Civil Engineering works, Doctoral thesis TU Delft, The Netherlands.
- D. Masse; J.L. Chotte; E. Scopel (2015). "Ecological engineering for sustainable agriculture in arid and semiarid West African regions". Fiche thématique du CSFD (11): 2. Archived from the original on 2016-04-23.
