= Ecotechnology =

Technology causing minimal ecological harm

Ecotechnology is an applied science that seeks to fulfill human needs while causing minimal ecological disruption, by harnessing and manipulating natural forces to leverage their beneficial effects. Ecotechnology integrates two fields of study: the 'ecology of technics' and the 'technics of ecology,' requiring an understanding of the structures and processes of ecosystems and societies. All sustainable engineering that can reduce damage to ecosystems, adopt ecology as a fundamental basis, and ensure conservation of biodiversity and sustainable development may be considered as forms of ecotechnology.

Ecotechnology emphasizes approaching a problem from a holistic point of view; for example, holding that environmental remediation of rivers should not only consider one single area but the whole catchment area, which includes the upstream, middle-stream, and downstream sections.

The construction industry can, in the ecotechnology view, reduce its impact on nature by consulting experts on the environment.

== Ecotechnics ==
During Ecotechnics '95 - International Symposium on Ecological Engineering in Östersund, Sweden, the participants agreed on the definition: "Ecotechnics is defined as the method of designing future societies within ecological frames."

Ecotechnics is defined as the 'techne' of bodies. Ecotechnics thinks of the body as a technology which makes possible the inclusion of a whole new range of bodies. This gives people more agency and biopower over their own use of their bodies. This makes it usable for queer theory and disability studies. An interpretation also refers to the term as the craft of the home. In classifying the body as a technical object, Jean-Luc Nancy explained how it works by partitioning bodies into their own zones and spaces, which also allow such bodies to connect with other bodies. Hence, Nancy claims that technology determine our interactions with other beings in the world. Ecotechnics is also central in Sullivan's and Murray's collection of essays Queering the Technologisation of Bodies. It is built on Bernard Stiegler's work that sees the body and technology as a double process: the technology and the body are informed by each other. Derrida who extends on both Nancy and Stiegler's ideas argues that the 'proper body' implicates interconnections of technical additions. Ecotechnics goes against the essentialist and binary notion of the body as a technological object which positions it within post-structuralism. The body can only be understood within its environment and this environment is a technical one.

Nancy also applied the ecotechnics concept to contemporary issues such as war and globalization. He maintained, for instance, that modern conflicts are produced by the dividing lines between: North and South; rich and poor; and, integrated and excluded. He also believes that ecotechnics is undoing communities due to the elimination of the polis and the prevalence of oikos, calling for a global sovereignty that would administer the world as a single household.

== See also ==
- Afforestation
- Agroforestry
- Analog forestry
- Biomass
- Biomass (ecology)
- Buffer strip
- Collaborative innovation network
- Deforestation
- Deforestation during the Roman period
- Desertification
- Ecological engineering
- Ecological engineering methods
- Energy-efficient landscaping
- Forest farming
- Forest gardening
- Great Plains Shelterbelt
- GreenTec Awards
- Hedgerow
- Home gardens
- Human ecology
- Institute of Ecotechnics
- Macro-engineering
- Megaprojects
- Mid Sweden University
- Permaculture
- Permaforestry
- Proposed sahara forest project
- Push–pull technology
- Sand fence
- Seawater Greenhouse
- Sustainable agriculture
- Sustainable design
- Terra preta
- Thomas P. Hughes
- Wildcrafting
- Windbreak
