= Great Green Wall (China) =

Windbreak forests planted in northern China

The Great Green Wall, officially known as the Three-North Shelter Forest Program (simplified Chinese: 三北防护林; traditional Chinese: 三北防護林; pinyin: Sānběi Fánghùlín), is a series of human-planted windbreaking forest strips (shelterbelts) in China, designed to hold back the expansion of the Gobi Desert and provide timber to the local population. The program started in 1978 and is planned to complete around 2050, at which point it will be expected to have created a vast green barrier spanning approximately 4,828 kilometres (3,000 mi) long and up to 1,448 kilometres (900 mi) wide in certain regions, and will encompass around 88 million acres of forests.

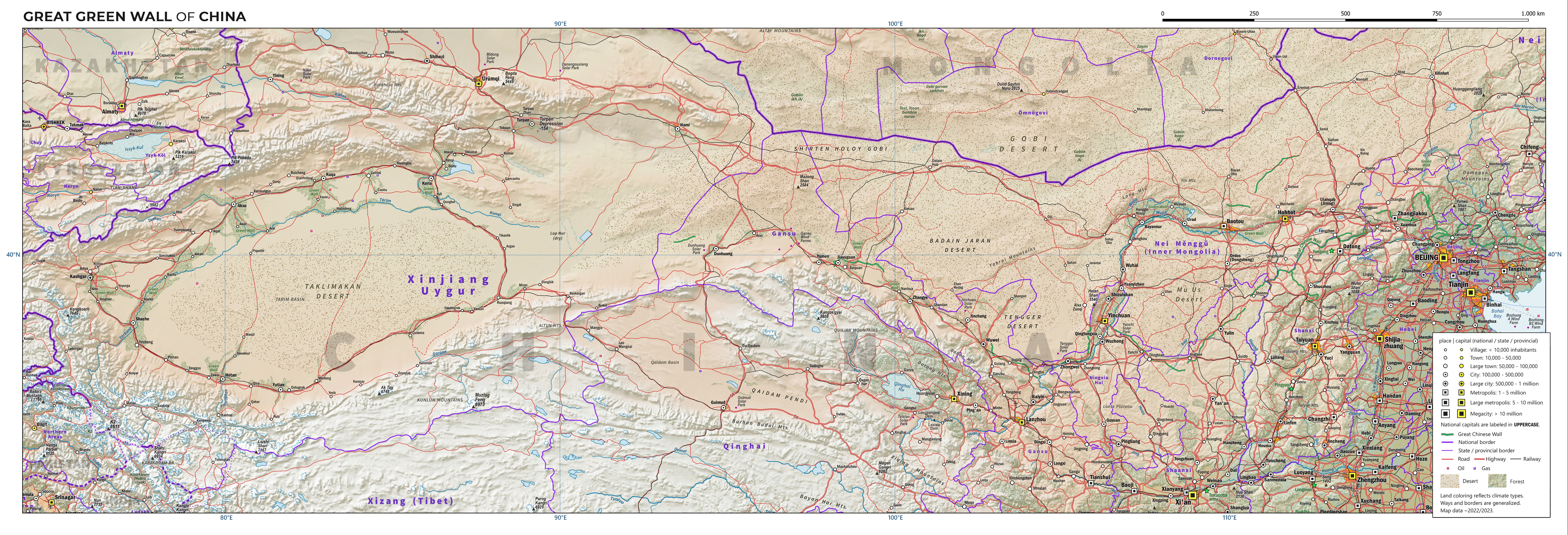
Topographic map of the Great Green Wall of China, 2023 (Northwest and North sections)

The project's name indicates that it is to be carried out in all three northern regions: the North, the Northeast, and the Northwest. This project has historical precedents dating back to before the Common Era. However, in premodern periods, government-sponsored afforestation projects along the historical frontier regions were mostly for military fortification.

China has the largest desert area of any country and is heavily affected by sandstorms. However, the country has implemented various measures to restore grasslands and forests, successfully slowing and now reversing overall desertification. In November 2024, China's government reported the completion of the 3,000 km green belt around the Taklamakan Desert. The fraction of the country covered by deserts declined from 27.2% in the previous decade to 26.8%.

Initiated mostly in Northern China, the Great Green Wall of China is a massive reforestation project meant to counteract desertification and slow down the consequences of climate change. Starting in the 1970s in reaction to the Gobi Desert incursion, the project was driven by the Chinese government. Early projects included massive tree planting to stop desertification and safeguard local communities and agricultural territory. Aiming to build a green barrier against desertification, dust storms, and ecological damage, the government started the "Three-North Shelterbelt Program" in the 2000s. This effort developed over time into the enormous environmental rehabilitation project known today as the Great Green Wall.

== Desertification from the Gobi desert ==
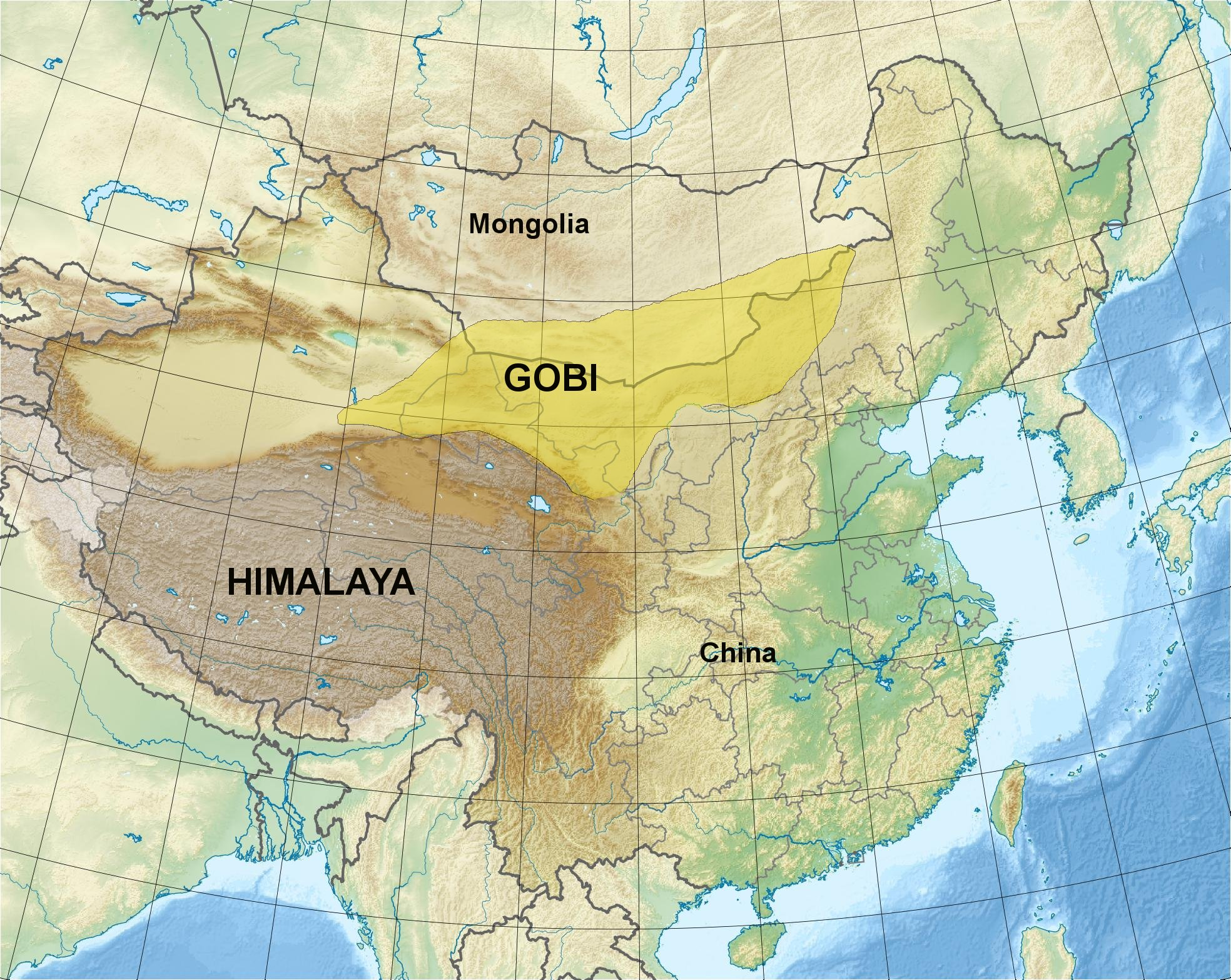
Map of China and the Gobi Desert

Desertification, which involves either human or natural activity changing normal humid areas to dry desert conditions, is a large and increasing problem faced by modern China. 29.7% of China had been desertified by the year 2000, with the rate of change increasing almost every year. In 2003, Worldchanging reported that 3,600 km^{2} (1,400 sq mi) of Chinese grassland were being overtaken annually by the Gobi Desert. In June 2001, National Geographic reported that annually, the dust storms blow off as much as 2,000 km^{2} (800 sq mi) of topsoil, and the storms were increasing in severity. Such storms have serious agricultural impacts on other nearby countries, including Japan, North Korea, and South Korea. The main cause of these changes was human activity, with water usage, mining, excess farming, and wood cutting being the top contributors. In 2022, Time reported progress in desert stabilization and that thousands of acres of shifting dunes had been stabilized, while the nationwide frequency of sandstorms, including those affecting Beijing, had "especially" dropped by one-fifth between 2009 and 2014.

In 2017, National Geographic reported that the policies in place at the time had contributed to the reduction of China's forests and grasslands. One example was the 'grain first' policy, which required grasslands to be converted into croplands. Reducing grass coverage eliminated one of the barriers to desertification. Most of these causes can be attributed to an underlying issue: population growth. The number of people living in important ecological areas has grown beyond the carrying capacity of those areas. In 2019, a study published in Nature Sustainability, found that while human activity had previously been associated with land degradation, these policies had led to a net increase in vegetated land in China.

In the past 40 years, the world as a whole has lost a third of its arable land due to desertification. Increasing desertification and related storms have caused some major issues for people living in China, especially around the Gobi desert. Crops and buildings are being damaged or destroyed. This has forced many people, who are now called "climate refugees" to leave their homelands. In total, the effects of desertification have affected the lives of over 400 million people. The Green Wall project was started in 1978, with the proposed result of raising northern China's forest cover from 5 to 15 percent, thereby reducing desertification.

Global movement of dust from an Asian dust storm

== Individual efforts ==
Yin Yuzhen planted trees to rehabilitate the desolate environment in the Uxin Banner of China's semi-arid western landscape. Yin's afforestation efforts have been recognized by individuals such as Chinese Communist Party general secretary Xi Jinping, who, during the 2020 National People's Congress, described the actions of those such as Yin as a remarkable achievement and an overall improvement of the ecology in China.

Similarly, Li Yunsheng has pioneered efforts to reforest the area around Matou Mountain in Youyu county of Shanxi. Youyu now has a forest containing over 130 million trees.

== Sand-plus-solar anti-desertification ==
China has been increasingly installing solar farms in its desert regions including Kubuqi Desert as part of efforts to combat desertification. Listed in its renewable energy plan for 2021 to 2025, China has called for the "large-scale development" of its sand-plus-solar anti-desertification method, a strategy that Beijing began promoting around 2023. Solar farms in desert areas contribute to China's renewable energy capacity while also helping to stabilize the landscape. The shade provided by the solar panels reduces the harsh impact of the sun on the soil, creating more favorable conditions for vegetation to grow. In some instances, grass has started to grow beneath the panels, which aids in reducing soil erosion and supporting the local ecosystem.

Additionally, solar panels have been documented to lower wind speeds at ground level, helping to prevent the movement of sand dunes and minimizing dust that can degrade the environment. This can lead to better air quality and improved conditions for plant growth, further aiding in the restoration of desertified land. In particular, liquorice plants has proven to be effective in the shaded areas beneath solar panels. As a nitrogen-fixing crop, it draws nitrogen from the air, adds organic matter to the soil, and gradually restores soil fertility. Over time, this helps improve the quality of the land, making it suitable for growing a wider variety of crops, such as tomatoes and melons. The more advanced solar farms in Chinese deserts currently feature elevated solar panels that allow for high-tech farming underneath, often in irrigated greenhouses. This approach combines renewable energy production with agricultural practices, contributing to both ecological restoration and food production. Though challenges such as sand buildup on panels and the costs associated with transporting energy from remote areas remain an issue, overall analysis of Landsat data indicates that solar projects have contributed to the greening of deserts in parts of China in recent years.

== Results and successes ==
In 2008, winter storms destroyed 10% of the new forest stock, causing the World Bank to advise China to focus more on quality rather than quantity in its stock species. By 2009, China's planted forest covered more than 500,000 square kilometers (increasing tree cover from 12% to 18%) – the largest artificial forest in the world.

According to Foreign Affairs, the Three-North Shelter Forest Program successfully transitioned the economic model of the Gobi Desert region from harmful farming agriculture to ecological-friendly tourism, fruit business, and forestry.

In 2018, the United States' National Oceanic and Atmospheric Administration found that the increase in forest coverage observed by satellites is consistent with Chinese government data. According to Shixiong Cao, an ecologist at Beijing Forestry University, the Chinese government recognized the water shortages problem in arid regions and changed the approach to plant vegetation with lower water requirements. Zhang Jianlong, head of the forestry department, told the media that the goal was to sustain the health of vegetation and choose suitable plant species and irrigation techniques.

According to a 2019 NASA Earth Observatory report, satellite data from 2000 to 2017 showed that China contributed significantly to global greening efforts, primarily through both large-scale afforestation programs and intensive agricultural practices. NASA's Moderate Resolution Imaging Spectroradiometer (MODIS) data suggested that China accounted for approximately 25% of the global increase in greening, with about 42% of this growth attributed to both forest conservation and expansion efforts aimed at mitigating soil erosion and climate change.

According to a BBC News report in 2020, tree plantation programs resulted in significant carbon dioxide absorption and helped mitigate climate change; the benefit of tree planting was underestimated by previous research. The Three-North Shelter Forest Program was also found to have reversed the desertification of the Gobi Desert, which grew 10,000 square kilometers per year in the 1980s, but was shrinking by more than 2,000 square kilometers per year in 2022.

In November 2024, China's government reported that after 46 years of work it had finished the 3,000-kilometer green belt around the Taklamakan Desert. The country's forest coverage grew from 10% of the overall territory in 1949 to 25% in 2024; the green belt project contributed to this achievement. Although the country's desert coverage was still 26.8% in 2024, this was down slightly from 27.2% a decade previously.

As of 2024, at least 30 million hectares of trees have been planted. Moreover, the authorities noted a notable decrease in the frequency and intensity of dust storms, especially in places like Beijing. The tree planting has helped to stabilize the soil and enhance the local microclimates, therefore aiding agriculture and stopping more desertification. Though these achievements are noteworthy, they do not allay the continuous worries regarding the ecological sustainability and efficacy of such massive operations.

A study published in 2026 indicates that the human-planted forests of the North Shelterbelt Project are growing 66% faster than natural forests as measured by metrics of leaf area index. After adjusting for age and growing conditions, these planted forests grow 46% faster than natural forests. However, natural forests continue to grow for hundreds of years whereas planted forests peak at 30-40 years of growth which limits their sequestration of carbon.

== Criticisms and challenges ==
Trees planted in Jinta County, Gansu province (2020)

Hong Jiang, a geography professor at the University of Wisconsin, worried trees could soak up large amounts of groundwater, which would be extremely problematic for arid regions like northern China. Dee Williams, a US Department of Interior anthropologist, pointed to China's past failures in anti-desertification efforts and suggested that planting trees is a temporary fix that could not change behavior.

In December 2003, American futurist Alex Steffen on his website Worldchanging strongly criticized the Green Wall project. He claimed China wasn't using collaborative effort and information platforms to support the local effort. China's increasing levels of pollution have also weakened the soil, causing it to be unusable in many areas.

Research of reforested areas of the Loess Plateau has found that the combination of exotic tree species and high-density planting could worsen water shortages. The forests increase the loss of soil moisture content when compared to farmland.

Reforestation has impacted the water cycle in China by increasing evapotranspiration and precipitation with evapotranspiration increasing more than precipitation which means that more water is lost than rains down. Precipitation increased in the Tibetan Plateau but not in eastern and northwestern China where more water is lost. Water recycling and water resource management needs to be incorporated into the reforestation efforts.

Furthermore, planting blocks of fast-growing trees reduces the biodiversity of forested areas, creating areas unsuitable for plants and animals normally found in forests. "China plants more trees than the rest of the world combined", says John MacKinnon, the head of the EU-China Biodiversity Programme, "but the trouble is they tend to be monoculture plantations. They are not places where birds want to live." The lack of diversity also makes the trees more susceptible to disease, as in 2000, when one billion poplar trees in Ningxia were lost to a single disease, setting back 20 years of planting efforts. China's forest scientists argued that monoculture tree plantations are more effective at absorbing the greenhouse gas carbon dioxide than slow-growth forests, so while diversity may be lower, the trees purportedly help to offset China's carbon emissions. A study in January 2023 that analyzed the establishment rates of forest and shrubland over the first 40 years of the project, found that only 1/5 of the survived forests became a forest stand within 10 years and only 1/10 were still alive after 40. Further, they found that shrubland was better adapted than forest while nearly half survived after 10 years and 1/3 still existed by 2017.

Liu Tuo, head of the Desertification Control Office in the State Forestry Administration, believed that there are huge gaps in the country's efforts to reclaim the land that has become desert. By 2011, around 1.73 million km^{2} of land had become desert in China, of which 530,000 km^{2} was treatable. But, at the 2011 rate of treating 1,717 km^{2} per year, it would take 300 years to reclaim the land that had become desert.

Critics have also questioned the project's efficacy in stopping the Gobi Desert's spread, noting that the severe arid climate and poor soil quality make it challenging to maintain tree development over the long run. Furthermore, although the initiative has made significant progress in reforestation, it has not adequately addressed the fundamental socioeconomic drivers of desertification, including overgrazing and unsustainable farming methods.

== See also ==
- Buffer strip
- Deforestation and climate change
- Energy-efficient landscaping
- Great Green Wall (Africa)
- Great Plains Shelterbelt, 1930s–40s, US
- Great Plan for the Transformation of Nature, 1940s–50s, Soviet Union
- List of countries by carbon dioxide emissions
- Macro-engineering
- Mu Us Desert, a desert affected by the Great Green Wall
- Sand fence
- Seawater greenhouse
- Great Wall of China
- Great Wall of Sand
