= Macro-engineering =

Implementation of large-scale design projects

In engineering, macro-engineering (alternatively known as mega engineering) is the implementation of large-scale design projects. It can be seen as a branch of civil engineering or structural engineering applied on a large landmass. In particular, macro-engineering is the process of marshaling and managing of resources and technology on a large scale to carry out complex tasks that last over a long period. In contrast to conventional engineering projects, macro-engineering projects (called macro-projects or mega-projects) are multidisciplinary, involving collaboration from all fields of study. Because of the size of macro-projects they are usually international.

Macro-engineering is an evolving field that has only recently started to receive attention. Because we routinely deal with challenges that are multinational in scope, such as global warming and pollution, macro-engineering is emerging as a transcendent solution to worldwide problems.

Macro-engineering is distinct from Megascale engineering due to the scales where they are applied. Where macro-engineering is currently practical, mega-scale engineering is still within the domain of speculative fiction because it deals with projects on a planetary or stellar scale.

== Projects ==
Macro engineering examples include the construction of the Panama Canal and the Suez Canal.

== Planned projects ==
Examples of projects include the Channel Tunnel and the planned Gibraltar Tunnel.

Two intellectual centers focused on macro-engineering theory and practice are the Candida Oancea Institute in Bucharest, and The Center for Macro Projects and Diplomacy at Roger Williams University in Bristol, Rhode Island.

== See also ==
- Afforestation
- Agroforestry
- Atlantropa (Gibraltar Dam)
- Analog forestry
- Bering Strait bridge
- Buffer strip
- Biomass
- Biomass (ecology)
- Climate engineering (Geoengineering)
- Collaborative innovation network
- Deforestation
- Deforestation during the Roman period
- Ecological engineering
- Ecological engineering methods
- Ecotechnology
- Energy-efficient landscaping
- Forest gardening
- Forest farming
- Great Plains Shelterbelt
- Green Wall of China
- IBTS Greenhouse
- Home gardens
- Human ecology
- Megascale engineering
- Permaculture
- Permaforestry
- Sahara Forest Project
- Qattara Depression Project
- Red Sea dam
- Sand fence
- Seawater Greenhouse
- Sustainable agriculture
- Terraforming
- Windbreak
- Wildcrafting
