= Great Plains Shelterbelt =

Areas between Canada and West Texas afforested as part of the New Deal

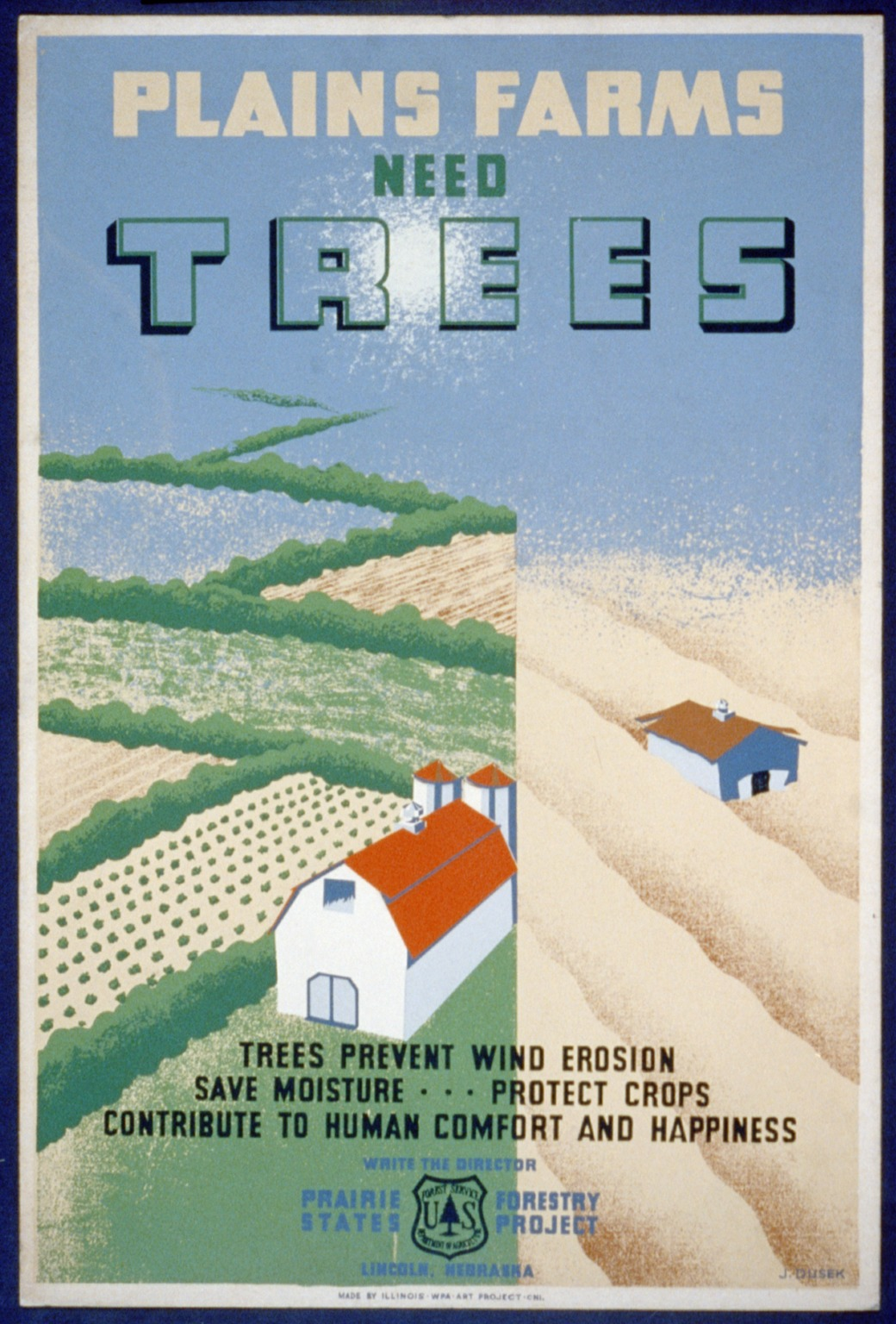
- Plains States Forestry Project poster created by the Works Progress Administration (1940)

Geography
- Location: Great Plains, United States
- Area: 18,600 square miles

Administration
- Established: 1934

The Great Plains Shelterbelt was a project to create windbreaks in the Great Plains states of the United States, that began in 1934. President Franklin D. Roosevelt initiated the project in response to the severe dust storms of the Dust Bowl, which resulted in significant soil erosion. The United States Forest Service believed that planting trees on the perimeters of farms would reduce wind velocity and lessen evaporation of moisture from the soil. By 1942, 220 million trees had been planted, covering 18,600 square miles (48,000 km^{2}) in a 100-mile (160-kilometre) wide zone from the Canadian border in North Dakota to the Brazos River in Texas. Even as of 2007, "the federal response to the Dust Bowl, including the Prairie States Forestry Project which planted the Great Plains Shelterbelt and creation of the Soil Erosion Service, represents the largest and most-focused effort of the [U.S.] government to address an environmental problem".

== History ==
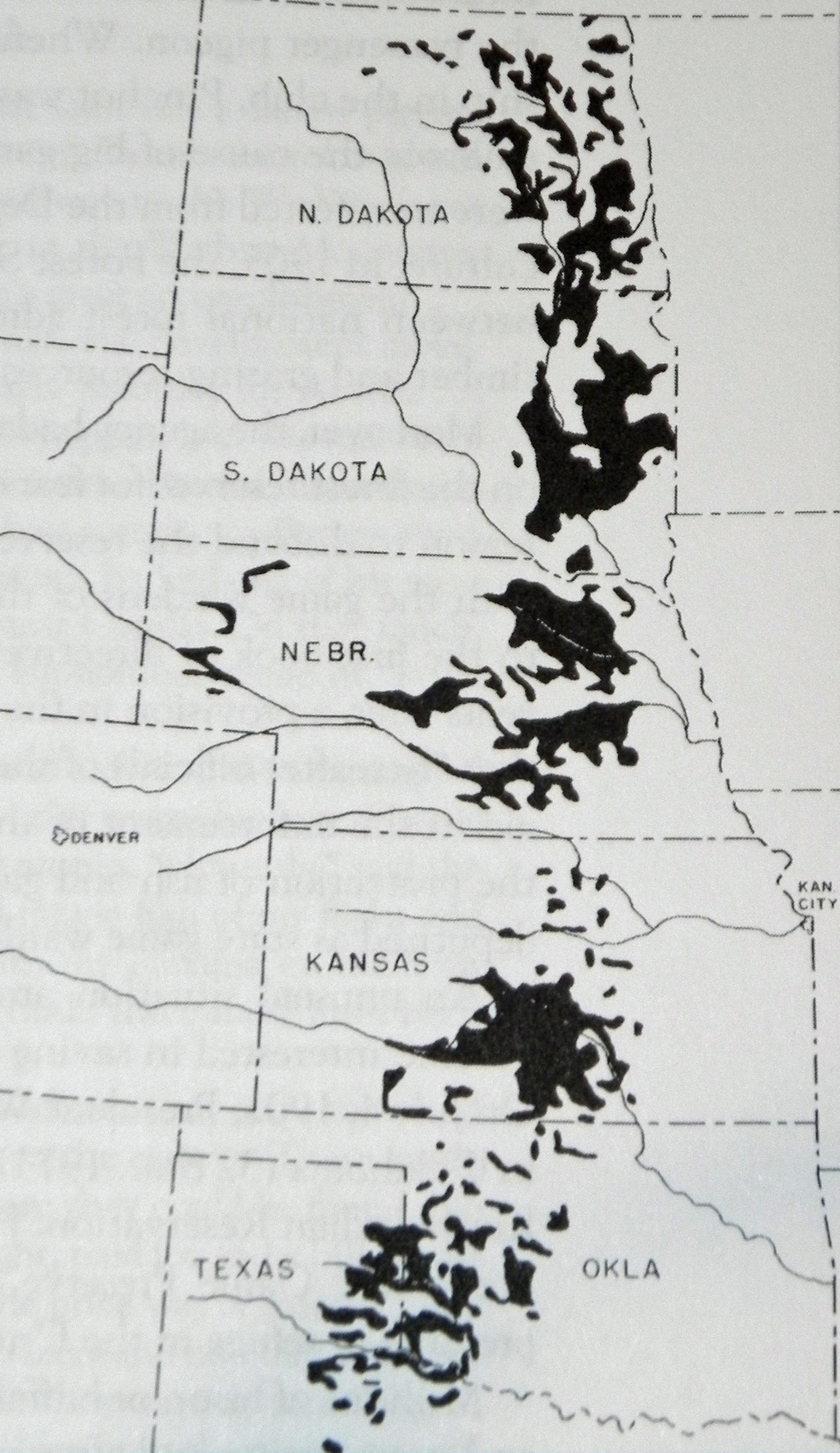
Map of major planting areas of the shelterbelt project

The "Number One Shelterbelt" is located in Greer County, in southwestern Oklahoma. Oklahoma's first State Forester, George R. Phillips, had the distinction of planting the very first tree in the federal program's very first shelterbelt in 1935. The first tree was an Austrian pine planted on the H.E. Curtis farm near Willow, Oklahoma, on March 18.

The project called for large-scale planting of trees across the Great Plains, stretching in a 100-mile wide zone from the Canadian border of North Dakota to northern Texas, to protect the land from wind erosion. Native trees, such as red cedar and green ash, were planted along fence rows separating properties, and farmers were paid to plant and cultivate them. The project was estimated to cost $75 million over 12 years. When disputes arose over funding sources (the project was considered to be a long-term strategy and therefore ineligible for emergency relief funds), FDR transferred the program to the Works Progress Administration (WPA).

The Great Plains Shelterbelt was allowed under the 1924 Clarke–McNary Act and was carried out by the WPA. Project headquarters were in Lincoln, Nebraska, and Raphael Zon served as the technical director. The U.S. Forest Service and Civilian Conservation Corps assisted. "The Shelterbelt Program of 1935–1942 ... [was] later known as the Prairie States Forestry Project."

By 1942, 30,233 shelterbelts had been planted, which contained 220 million trees and covered 18,600 square miles (48,000 km^{2}).

== Restoration efforts in the 21st century ==
As of 2010, "Many shelterbelts in Kansas and throughout the central Great Plains are old and are no longer providing the benefits that they used to", according to Kansas State Forester Larry Biles.

As of 2004 in Nebraska,

Today, the growth and vigor of many of the trees has declined due to close spacing, age, and invasion of undesirable, short-lived trees. The Nebraska Forest Service and the Upper Elkhorn Natural Resource District, in cooperation with the Schleusener family, has established two demonstration areas within this windbreak to show methods of improving the condition of the remaining trees and to encourage new growth and establishment of desirable trees. The area closest to the roadway will remain unaltered as a living reminder of the Prairie States Forestry Project and the efforts of Nebraskans to protect our valuable farmland.

In 2010, federal grants were made available for shelterbelt maintenance and restoration in Kansas, North Dakota, South Dakota, and Nebraska as part of the Central Great Plains Shelterbelt Renovation and the Central Great Plains Forested Riparian Buffer CCPI proposals. Funding for the CCPI (Cooperative Conservation Partnership Initiative) is provided as a project of the Department of Agriculture's Natural Resources Conservation Service.

== See also ==
- Afforestation
- Agroforestry
- Buffer strip
- Desertification
- Ecological engineering
- Ecological engineering methods
- Ecotechnology
- Energy-efficient landscaping
- Great Plan for the Transformation of Nature
- Hedge
- Human ecology
- Macro-engineering
- Great Green Wall (Africa)
- Great Green Wall (China)
- Protection forest
- Sand fence
- Sustainable agriculture
- Windbreak

== Notes ==
- Bates, C. G. (December 1, 1934). "The Plains Shelterbelt Project". Journal of Forestry. 32, no. 9 (14): 978–991.
