= Xi Jinping Thought on Ecological Civilization =

Chinese ideological doctrine

Xi Jinping Thought on Ecological Civilization (Chinese: 习近平生态文明思想) is the current ecological doctrine of the People's Republic of China, based on the concept of ecological civilization. It is a part of the larger Xi Jinping Thought, which derived from the speeches of general secretary of the Chinese Communist Party Xi Jinping. It was established during the National Ecological and Environmental Protection Conference, held in May 2018.

== History ==
Xi Jinping Thought on Ecological Civilization was first established during the National Ecological and Environmental Protection, held on 18-19 May 2018. Beginning in 2017, Chinese universities and regional governments have begun establishing centers for the study of Xi Jinping Thought on Ecological Civilization. At least 18 such centers had been established as of 2021. In July 2021, the Research Center for Xi Jinping Thought on Ecological Civilization was launched in Beijing, which is run by the Ministry of Ecology and Environment. The Thought was also mentioned in the work report given by Xi during the 20th National Congress of the Chinese Communist Party in October 2022.

== Content ==
The National Ecological and Environmental Protection in May 2018 summarized Xi Jinping Thought on Ecological Civilization in six principles. In June 2018, the CCP Central Committee proposed to thoroughly implement Xi Jinping Thought on Ecological Civilization from the perspective of eight principles, adding two principles to the Thought. The Thought calls on to adhering to:

1. the principle that civilization will flourish when ecology flourishes
2. to the harmonious coexistence of man and nature
3. the principle that clear waters and green mountains are invaluable assets
4. the principle that a good ecological environment is the most universal benefit to the people
5. the principle that mountains, rivers, forests, fields, lakes and grasslands are a community of life
6. the most stringent system and the most stringent rule of law to protect the ecological environment
7. the national action of building a beautiful China
8. the joint efforts of the people to build a global ecological civilization

On 18 August 2022, the Xi Jinping Thought on Ecological Civilization Research Center published an article on People's Daily, summarizing Xi Jinping Thought on Ecological Civilization into "ten insistences". These are insisting on:

1. Party's overall leadership over ecological civilization construction
2. that civilization will flourish if ecology flourishes
3. harmonious coexistence between man and nature
4. that clear waters and green mountains are invaluable assets
5. that a good ecological environment is the most universal benefit to the people
6. that green development is a profound revolution in the development concept
7. coordinating the management of mountains, rivers, forests, farmlands, lakes, grasslands and deserts
8. using the strictest system and the most stringent rule of law to protect the ecological environment
9. transforming the construction of a beautiful China into the conscious action of all people
10. jointly seeking a path for global ecological civilization construction

== See also ==
- Environment of China
- Great Plan for the Transformation of Nature
