= Environment of Russia =

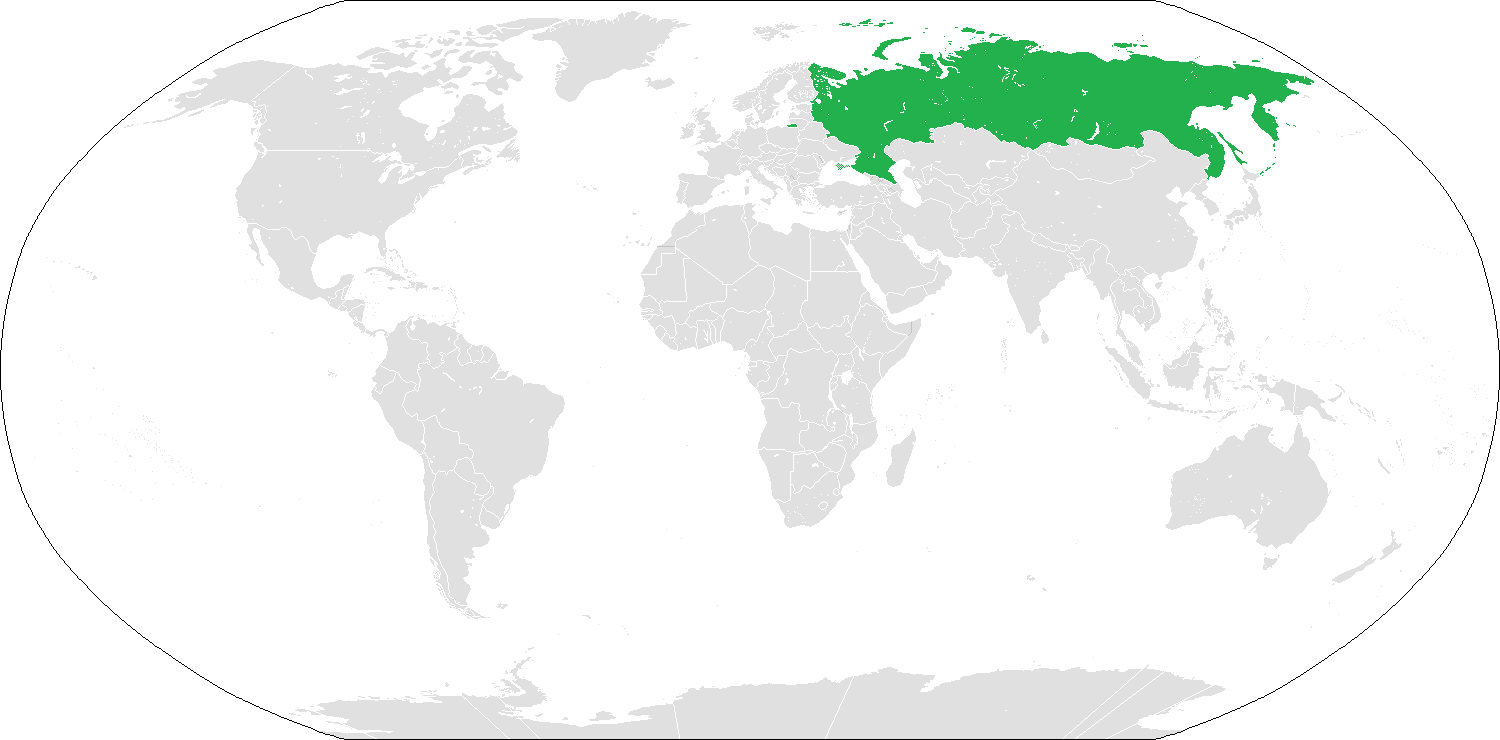

The environment of Russia.

== Climate ==
Köppen climate types of Russia

The climate of Russia is formed under the European peninsula. The enormous size of the country and the remoteness of many areas from the sea result in the dominance of the continental climate, which is prevalent in European and Asian Russia except for the tundra and the best extreme southeast. Mountains in the south obstructing the flow of cold air masses from the Arctic Ocean and the plain of the south and north makes the country open to Pacific and Atlantic influences.

== Waste management ==
141 019 100 tonnes of hazardous waste was generated in Russia in 2009

== Environmental policy and law ==
=== Treaties and international agreements ===
Russia is a signatory to a number of treaties and international agreements:

Party to
Air Pollution, Air Pollution-Nitrogen Oxides, Air Pollution-Sulphur 85, Antarctic-Environmental Protocol, Antarctic Treaty, Biodiversity, Climate Change, Endangered Species, Environmental Modification, Hazardous Wastes, Law of the Sea, Marine Dumping, Nuclear Test Ban, Ozone Layer Protection, Ship Pollution, Tropical Timber 83, Wetlands, Whaling, Climate Change-Kyoto Protocol
Signed, but not ratified
Air Pollution-Sulphur 94,

== Environmental issues ==
Air pollution from heavy industry, emissions of coal-fired electric plants, and transportation in major cities; industrial, municipal, and agricultural pollution of inland waterways and sea coasts; deforestation; soil erosion; soil contamination from improper application of agricultural chemicals; scattered areas of sometimes intense radioactive contamination; ground water contamination from toxic waste; considerable biodiversity addressed by the country's Biodiversity Action Plan.

While Russia possesses vast mineral and energy wealth, this does not come without some price both to Russia and to the greater globe. Particularly, oil and gas extraction exacts a heavy cost to the health of the land and people. Drilling waste water, mud, and sludges are accumulated, annual volumes have been estimated at 1.7 million tons of chemical reagents contaminating 25 million cubic meters of topsoil.

Considerable geomechanical disturbances, contamination of soils and water, and multiple increases of contaminated waste water ejected into surface water streams, is a serious problem offsetting Russia's profits from the industry. It has been estimated that between 1991 and 1999 the volume of contaminated waste waters from the Russian oil industry amounted to 200 million cubic meters. Complete utilization of co-extracted gas in oil extraction does not exceed 80% in Russia, it has been variously estimated that annually 5-17 billion cubic meters of un-utilized gas extracted alongside oil is burnt in "gas torches," with 400,000 tons or more hazardous substances released into the atmosphere from this each year, creating the double impact of wasted resource and negative environmental effect. 560 million tons of methane is estimated to leak annually into the atmosphere from oil and gas extraction, not counting accidental outbursts and pipe breakage.

Other valuable industries also have their costs, such as the coal industry's release of vast quantities of hazardous, toxic, and radioactive materials. Also the Russian gold industry, with Russia being the only nation for at least a century with high extraction of gold from placer deposits, and having 4000+ large deposits, inevitably creates problems for the river systems. The associated pollution from using mass explosions in mining also can be a problem. Overall, the extensive mineral wealth and riches, brings with it both great benefit to the Russian economy & people, and the greater globe and all people, yet also several difficult problems to be dealt with.

== See also ==
- Great Plan for the Transformation of Nature
- List of environmental issues
