= Li Yunsheng =

Li Yunsheng is a Chinese man known for his reforestation efforts. Residing in Youyu County in Shanxi for seven decades, Li and the people of Youyu have conditioned their lives around the cause of afforestation. At 65 years old, Li Yunsheng began planting hundreds of trees around Matou Mountain. Born at Matoushan Village in a harsh desert climate, Li lived in an exposed barren land deprived of life and desolate in nature. The difficulty of the environment made it toilsome to cook and boil water, forcing Li and his family to eat foods simple in nature that were flower-based and drink water that was left untreated.

== Early career ==
Li had been discharged from the military after being stationed in the People's Liberation Army in 1984. He soon found work as a driver, eventually establishing his own driving school. Living in the village with his wife and three children, Li found that the land was harsh and unforgiving, and they struggled to get by. In 2002, the Youyu Government relocated 20 households in the Matoushan Village due to these remote, barren conditions. However, Li felt as though he could not part with the village. Rather than leaving and relocating himself and his family, he instead opted to stay and improve the overall atmosphere of the village and the sandy Matou Mountain. However, Li had trouble finding support for his passion, as family members and friends mocked him for spending all his money on shrubs and pines in order to fix the soil.

== Tree planting ==
Li travelled up the mountain every day, packing a lunch and a cool drink to aid him on his journey. He was able to contract about 83 hectares of Matou Mountain and used the land acquired to spread his forest. Initially, Li had trouble planting in the poor soil, much like other efforts from the Chinese Government in the Great Green Wall initiative. In the Gobi Desert, trees can combat the harsh conditions of the desert and without them, saplings will have difficulty surviving initially. The desert winds are fierce, and saplings with no support cover from other trees are often battered through sandstorms and the harsh winds that reside in deserts. Li had a solution for this, though as through trial and error his methods as he stated, "First I wrapped the roots of saplings with plastic bags, stabilized the roots with mud deep inside the sandy land. After two or three years, I dug the sand and moved away from the plastic bags. Through this way, the saplings could be rooted stably in sandy lands regardless of the wind." Planting trees upwards of five times repetitively for them to survive, Li was determined to change the surrounding landscape. He lacked easy access to supplies as there was no road and all supplies were carried on foot.

Li fell into debt as a result of his massive spending for his tree-planting passion, accumulating five million Yuan in debt ($726,000). Ultimately, Wang Jian of the Transportation Bureau elected for the creation of a road which Li was able to use to easily transport supplies to Youyu. With enhanced transportation, Li exported cattle and facilitate the purchase of more trees and earned enough to pay off his debt. Li initially spent 100,000-200,000 yuan each year to fund tree planting. In more recent years, the forest has become so lush that he only needs to spend about 10,000 a year to replant old trees that have died and proper forest management. He attributes this massive spending to his love of trees, stating; "What I'm aiming for...I really don't know the answer. I just simply love trees."

As a result of his efforts, Youyu has been transformed into an extensive forest that has upwards of 130 million trees in its vicinity. Forestation has increased from less than 0.3% of land with vegetation to 54% of land green with trees and vegetation. Recently Li has taken up a breeding business that has allowed him to turn a profit on this land by earning upwards of 300,000-500,000 yuan of profit as well as his cattle business made possible by the road into town. The soil surrounding the county has become more fertile in nature as well as boosting the business dealings of Shanxi Youyu Tuyuan Industries. With the improvement of the environment, the company has been able to plant and harvest good quality scallions and even make a substantial profit from them, which was not possible years ago when Li first began.
