= Filter strip =

Strips of vegetated land used to reduce the contamination of surface water

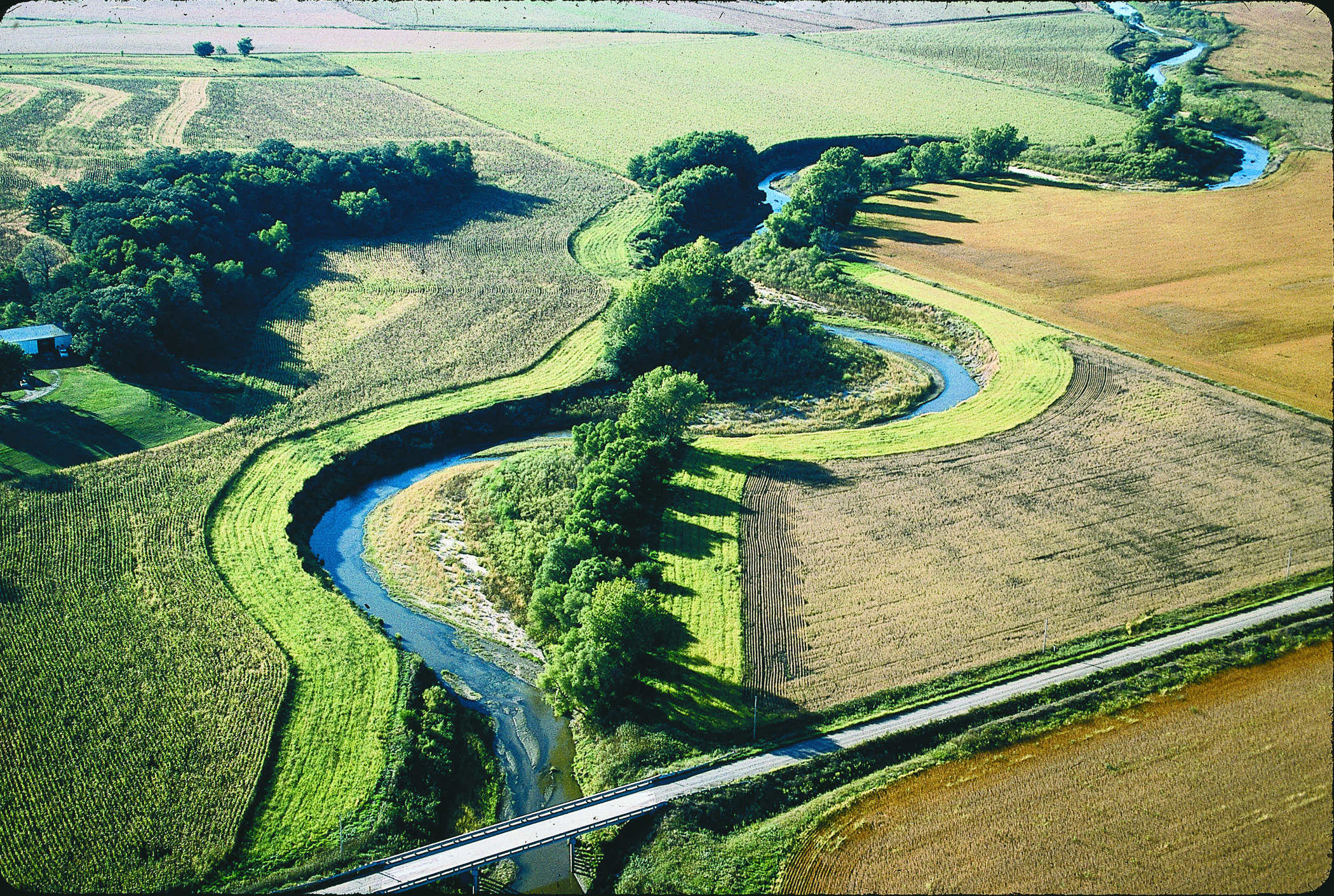
A grass filter strip and forested riparian buffer used to protect a stream from agricultural non point source pollution

Filter strips are strips of permanently vegetated land that are used to reduce the contamination of surface water. They are primarily used in agriculture to control non-point source pollution, however, they may also be used to reduce sediment in storm water runoff from construction sites. There are several types of filter strips including vegetative filter strips, prairie strips and forested riparian buffers. In agriculture, they are highly effective in reducing the concentration of nitrogen (N) and phosphorus (P) in runoff into surface water and are also effective in reducing sediment erosion and removing pesticides. This helps to prevent eutrophication and associated fishkills and loss of biodiversity. The use of filter strips is very common in developed countries and is required by law in some areas. The implementation and maintenance of filter strips is inexpensive and their use has been shown to be cost effective.

== Functions ==
Filter strips are primarily used in agriculture to control nonpoint source pollution. They function by decreasing the velocity of water, allowing runoff and dissolved inorganic molecules to infiltrate the soil. Vegetation then uptakes these inorganic molecules, notably nitrogen and phosphorus, reducing their concentrations in nearby surface water.

Filter strips may also be used as sediment traps to reduce sediment in storm water runoff from construction sites.

=== Impact on the environment ===
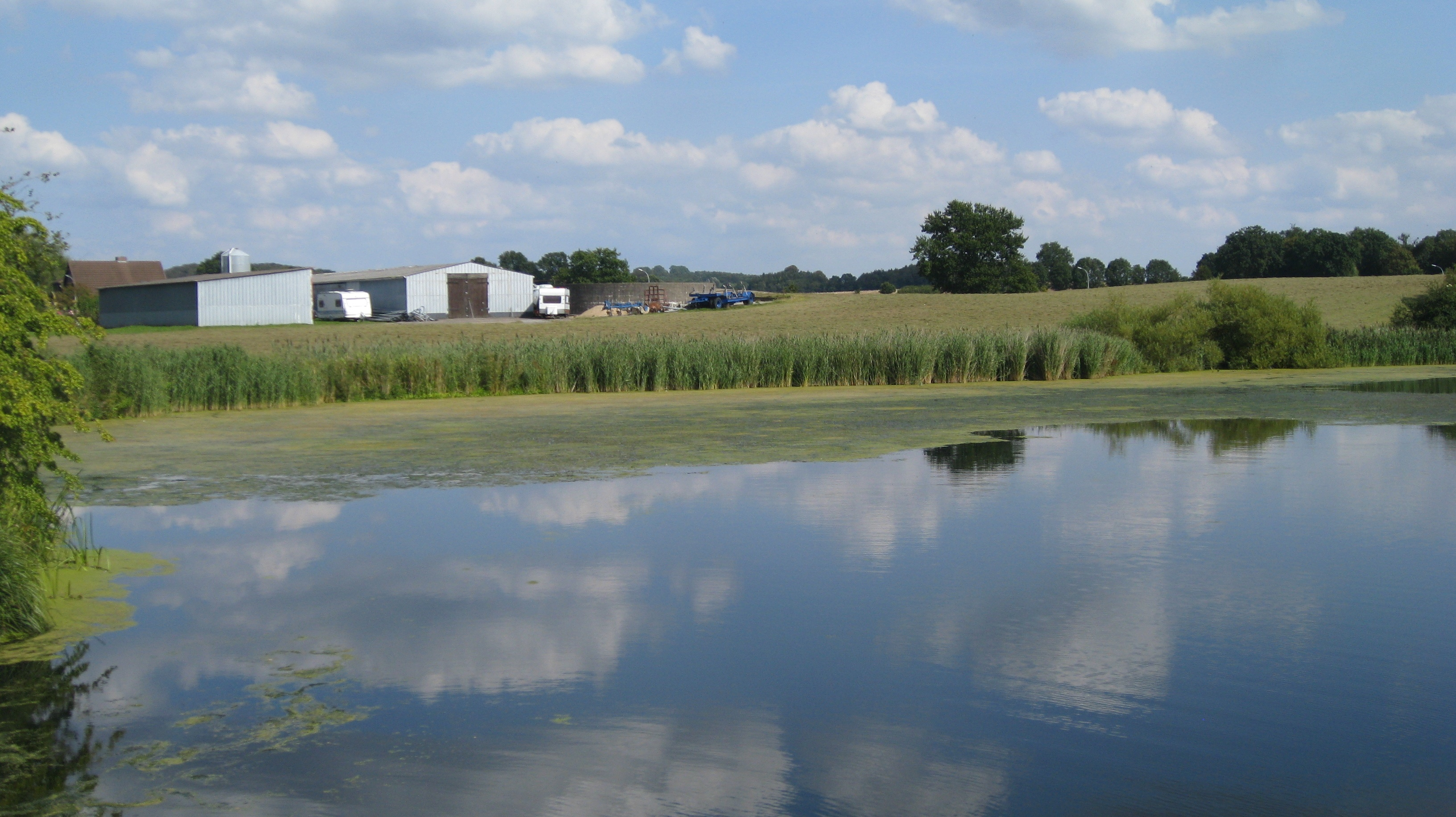
Eutrophication in a lake caused by nonpoint pollution from agriculture

Eutrophication in a lake caused by nonpoint pollution from agriculture Filter strips are commonly used to prevent eutrophication in surface waters. Eutrophication is a widespread problem in rivers, lakes, estuaries, and coastal oceans, directly caused by the over-enrichment of nitrogen and phosphorus; the source of which is overwhelmingly nonpoint pollution from agriculture. The excess of these nutrients leads to uncontrolled growth of plants and algae (and phytoplankton in saltwater environments). As they are decomposed by microorganisms, oxygen is depleted, resulting in hypoxia. This can lead to fishkills and the mass deaths of other fauna, creating a state of severely reduced biodiversity.

=== Impact on human health ===
By reducing the concentration of chemical fertilizers in surface water, filter strips have a positive effect on human health. Although elevated concentrations of phosphorus in water is not directly toxic to humans, nitrates poses a serious risk to human health. At high concentrations, the ingestion of nitrates can result in an acute condition known as methemoglobinemia in which the oxygen carrying capacity of hemoglobin is impaired. Infants are especially susceptible, which is why the disease is colloquially referred to as "blue baby syndrome."

In areas where humans rely on fishing or aquafarming for nourishment, decreased populations of fish and shellfish can lead to undernourishment and associated diseases.

== Types ==
=== Vegetative filter strip ===
Vegetative filter strips are small, edge-of-field tracts of vegetated land. This type of filter strip is planted with a perennial grass or legumes that have a high rate of nitrogen fixation. Several species are used. The most common grasses are switchgrass, orchardgrass, and tall fescue. Typical legumes are clovers and alfalfa.

=== Prairie filter strip ===
Prairie filter strips function in the same manner as vegetative filter strips, however they are populated with local prairie grasses. The use of prairie grass has some benefits, especially increased biodiversity, as opposed to vegetative filter strips, and their multilayered root systems and strong stems make them better suited for adverse weather.

=== Forested riparian buffer ===
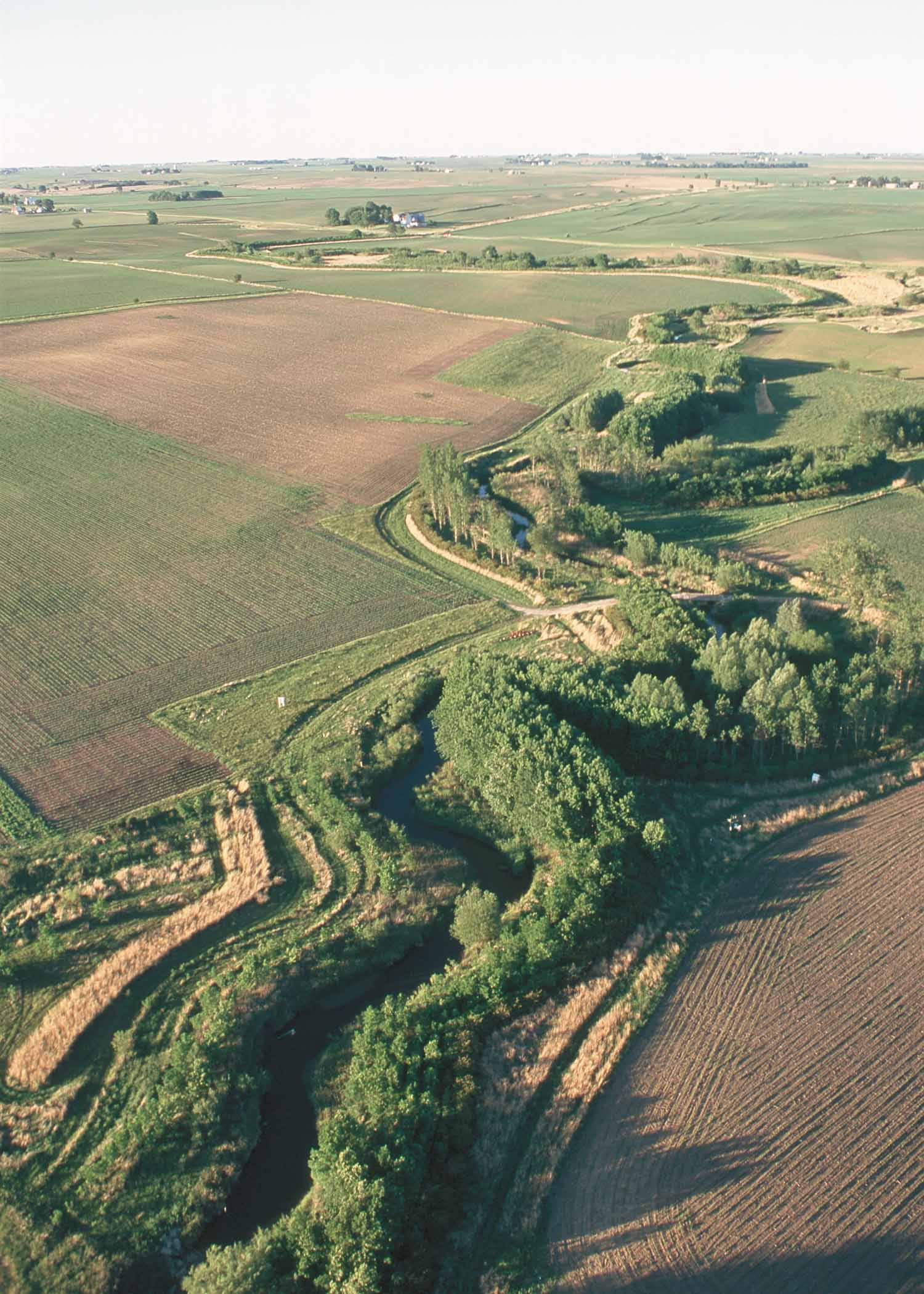
A forested riparian buffer on Bear Creek in Story County, Iowa

Forested riparian buffers are filter strips that consist of planted and/or remnant indigenous trees and other flora, as opposed to consisting only of grasses and/or legumes like vegetative and prairie filter strips. Whilst prairie filter strips and vegetative filter strips may not necessarily run alongside a stream, forested riparian buffers are situated specifically alongside the banks of a stream. Forested riparian buffers support a higher abundance of terrestrial fauna in comparison to undisturbed land, largely due to their increased abundance of edge-preferring species (as riparian buffers are edge habitats).

== Effectiveness ==
Filter strips are highly effective in reducing the concentration of nitrogen (N) and phosphorus (P) in runoff into surface water. Zhou et al. (2014) found that prairie filter strips reduced the concentration of nitrate, total nitrogen, and total phosphorus in runoff by 35%, 73%, and 82% respectively. Abu-Zreig, Majed, et al. (2003) found that vegetated filter strips were effective in reducing the concentration of phosphorus, with results ranging from 61% to 89% for 2m-wide filter strips and 15m-wide filter strips respectively. This indicates that filter strips are effective at even small widths.

Filter strips have also been shown to be very effective in sediment trapping. A study of sediment removal found that prairie filter strips had a 96% sediment trapping efficiency over a 4-year period. As with nitrogen and phosphorus reduction, the sediment trapping efficiency of a filter strip varies by a number of factors, including subsurface conditions, surface conditions, and sediment characteristics.

== Prevalence ==
The use of filter strips is very common throughout the developed world. Their use is stipulated by law in some areas. Minnesota, for example, requires farmers to install a filter strip along all public bodies of water and drainage ditches.

== Cost ==
The main cost associated with filter strips is the decrease in yield due to a loss of cultivatable land. Other costs are those associated with creating, planting, and maintaining a filter strip. The annual private cost of maintaining two filter strips on a Missouri watershed was found to be $62.40/ac.(4046.86m^{2}), though cost varies by location due to different land values.

== See also ==
- Buffer Strip
- Erosion control
- Eutrophication
- Nonpoint source pollution
- Runoff
