= Ecological civilization =

Hypothetical society state

Ecological civilization is the hypothetical concept that describes the alleged final goal of social and environmental reform within a given society. It implies that the changes required in response to global climate disruption and social injustices are so extensive as to require another form of human civilization, one based on ecological principles. It has become one of the tenets of the ideology of the Chinese Communist Party, often referred to as Xi Jinping Thought on Ecological Civilization.

== Conceptualization ==
Broadly construed, ecological civilization involves a synthesis of economic, educational, political, agricultural, and other societal changes toward sustainability.

Although the term was first coined in the 1980s, it did not see widespread use until 2007, when "ecological civilization" became an explicit goal of the Chinese Communist Party (CCP). In April 2014, the United Nations Alliance of Civilizations and the International Ecological Safety Collaborative Organization founded a sub-committee on ecological civilization. Proponents of ecological civilization agree with Pope Francis who writes, "We are faced not with two separate crises, one environmental and the other social, but rather with one complex crisis which is both social and environmental. Strategies for a solution demand an integrated approach to combating poverty, restoring dignity to the excluded, and at the same time protecting nature." As such, ecological civilization emphasizes the need for major environmental and social reforms that are both long-term and systemic in orientation.

The Chinese government views ecological civilization as linked to the development of the Belt and Road Initiative, where sometimes the term "Green Silk Road" is used. The government's view of ecological civilization is focused on cities, under the view that any solution for the climate crisis must focus on cities because that is where most people live, most energy is consumed, and most carbon emissions are generated. China has designated ecological civilization pilot cities, including Guiyang.

== History ==
In 1984, former Soviet Union environment experts proposed the term "Ecological Civilization" in an article entitled "Ways of Training Individual Ecological Civilization under Mature Socialist Conditions", which was published in the Scientific Communism, Moscow, vol. 2.

Three years later, the concept of ecological civilization (Chinese: 生态文明; pinyin: shēngtài wénmíng) was picked up in China, and was first used by Qianji Ye (1909–2017), an agricultural economist, in 1987. Professor Ye defined ecological civilization by drawing from the ecological sciences and environmental philosophy. The Chinese approach of ecological civilization is influenced by the legacy of China's "complete utilization" principle. Complete utilization was a waste-recycling and production efficiency principle that had developed in the 1950s as a response to material scarcity in the early PRC; its underlying philosophy was expressed in the slogan "turning waste into treasure and harm into benefit."

Beginning in 1998, the CCP began to shift from a focus on pure developmentalism towards eco-developmentalism. Responding both to scientific evidence on the environment and increasing public pressure, the CCP began to re-formulate its ideology to recognize that the developmentalist approach during reform and opening up was not sustainable. The CCP began to use the terminology of environmental culture (huanjing wenhua) and ecological civilization.

The term is found more extensively in Chinese discussions beginning in 2007. In 2012, the Chinese Communist Party (CCP) included the goal of achieving an ecological civilization in its constitution, and it also featured in its five-year plan. The 18th National Congress of the Chinese Communist Party in 2012 made ecological civilization one of the country's five national development goals. It emphasized a rural development approach of "Ecology, Productivity, Livability". Ecological civilization gained further prominence in China after it was incorporated into Xi Jinping's approach to the Chinese Dream. In the Chinese context, the term generally presupposes the framework of a "constructive postmodernism", as opposed to an extension of modernist practices or a "deconstructive postmodernism", which stems from the deconstruction of Jacques Derrida.

Since 2015, the Chinese discussion of ecological civilization is increasingly associated with an "organic" form of Marxism. "Organic Marxism" was first used by Philip Clayton and Justin Heinzekehr in their 2014 book, Organic Marxism: An Alternative to Capitalism and Ecological Catastrophe. The book, which was translated into Chinese and published by the People's Press in 2015, describes ecological civilization as an orienting goal for the global ecological movement.

The discourse of ecological civilization has influenced the urban planning in China and Chinese development of eco-cities, low-carbon cities, and green cities in China.

Beginning in 2017, Chinese universities and regional governments have begun establishing centers for the study of Xi Jinping Thought on Ecological Civilization. At least 18 such centers had been established as of 2021.

In 2018, the constitution of China was amended to include the concept of ecological civilization building, as part of amendments that emphasized environmental conservation and the scientific outlook on development. In 2022, the 20th National Congress of the Chinese Communist Party further highlighted ecological civilization as a core developmental goal of the CCP.

The first time the phrase "ecological civilization" was used as a technical term in an English-language book was in 1995 by Roy Morrison in his book Ecological Democracy. Both "ecological civilization" and "constructive postmodernism" have been associated with the process philosophy of Alfred North Whitehead. David Ray Griffin, a process philosopher and professor at Claremont School of Theology, first used the term "constructive postmodernism" in his 1989 book, Varieties of Postmodern Theology. A more secular theme that flowed out of Whitehead's process philosophy has been from the Australian environmental philosopher Arran Gare in his book called The Philosophical Foundations of Ecological Civilization: A Manifesto for the Future.

The largest international conference held on the theme "ecological civilization" (Seizing an Alternative: Toward an Ecological Civilization) took place at Pomona College in June 2015, bringing together roughly 2,000 participants from around the world and featuring such leaders in the environmental movement as Bill McKibben, Vandana Shiva, John B. Cobb, Jr., Wes Jackson, and Sheri Liao. This was held in conjunction with the 9th International Forum on Ecological Civilization--an annual conference series in Claremont, CA established in 2006. Out of the Seizing an Alternative conference, Philip Clayton and Wm. Andrew Schwartz co-founded the Institute for Ecological Civilization (EcoCiv), and co-authored the book What is Ecological Civilization: Crisis, Hope, and the Future of the Planet, which was published in 2019.

== See also ==
- Deep ecology
- Ecological crisis
- Ecological economics
- Ecological modernization
- Ecomodernism
- Environmentalism
- Environmental movement
- Social metabolism
- Anthropogenic metabolism
