= Sand fence =

Erosion control structure

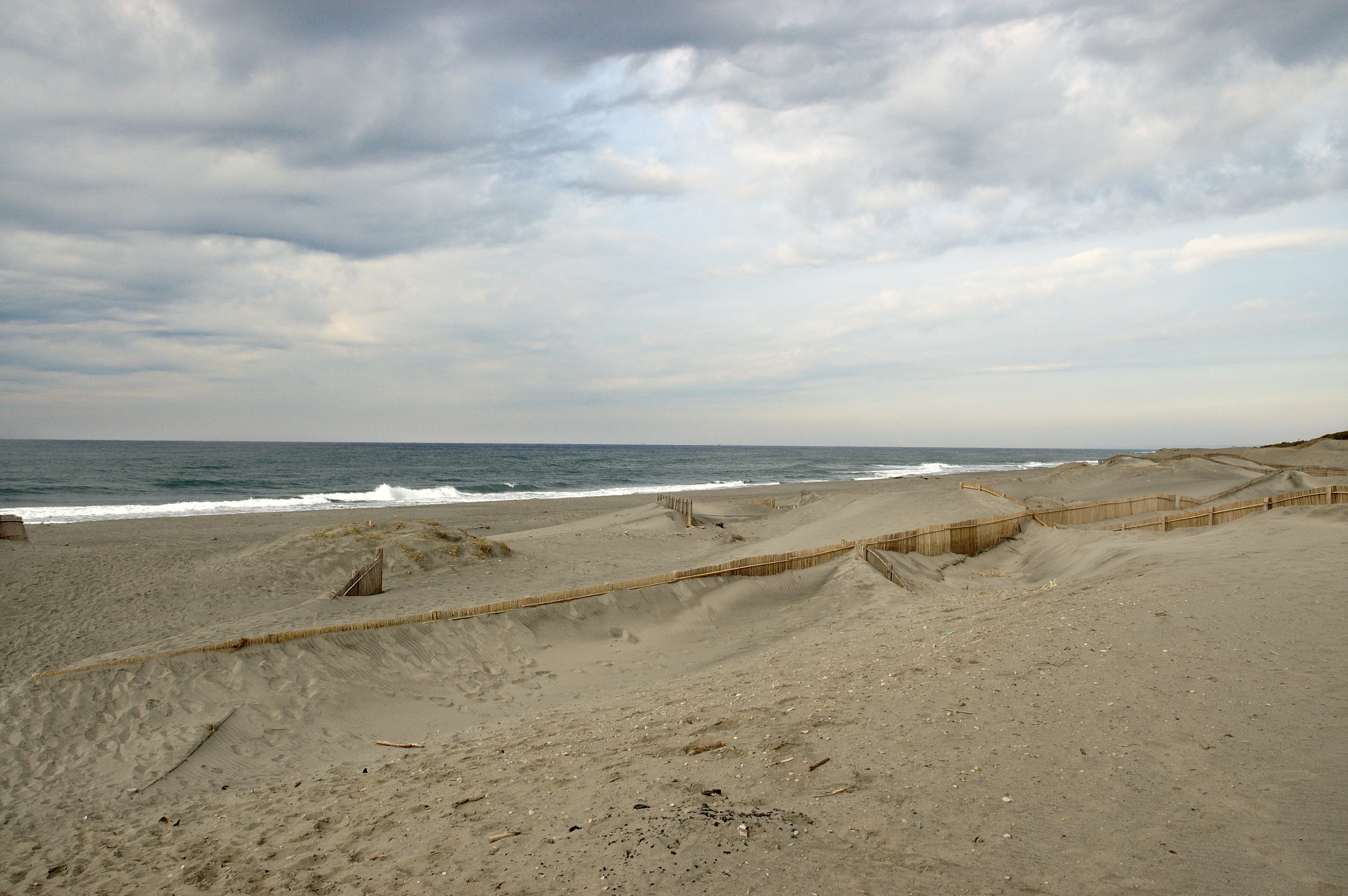
Nakatajima sand dunes are located in the southern part of Hamamatsu city. The barricade fences constructed from bamboo prevent excessive drifting of the sand and thus preserve the dune area.

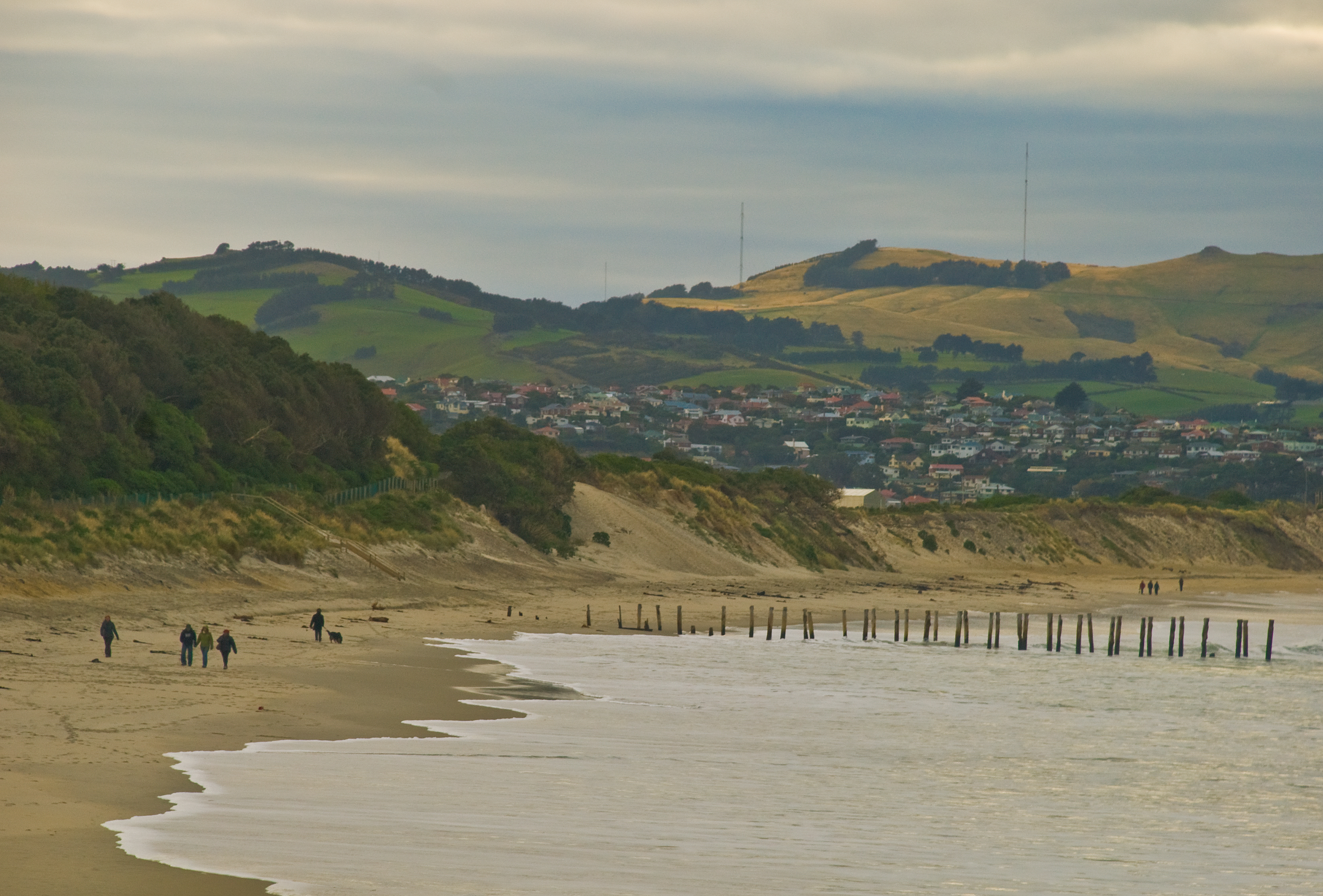
A local landmark in Dunedin, New Zealand — the St. Clair Beach posts are the remains of a series of sandbreaks, originally linked by boards to catch the blown sand.

A sand fence or sandbreak, similar to a snow fence, is a barrier used to force windblown, drifting sand to accumulate in a desired place. Sand fences are employed to control erosion, help sand dune stabilization, keep sand off roadways, and to recruit new material in desert areas. Sand fences are also commonly employed following storm events in order to aid in the dune recovery process, particularly in developed areas where dunes are critical for protection of property.

A typical construction is to attach a perforated plastic sheet to stakes at regular intervals, similar to construction site fencing or temporary sports field fencing. Another is a cedar or other lightweight wood strip and wire fence, also attached to metal stakes. A permanent sand fence is generally of larger wooden poles set deeply into the ground with large wooden planks running horizontally across them.

The drifting and settling of sand behind and in front of such a fence occurs because the wind speed on both the downwind and windward sides is less than that on the far windward side, allowing light materials such as sand to settle. This creates a pile both in front of and behind the sand fence causing more sand to drop out. Conveniently the sand does not drop on the barrier itself, otherwise it would soon be buried and rendered useless.

== See also ==
- Agroforestry
- Buffer strip
- Desertification
- Energy-efficient landscaping
- Groyne
- Great Plains Shelterbelt
- Hedgerow
- Macro-engineering
- Snow fence
- Windbreak
