= Buffer strip =

Land management technique

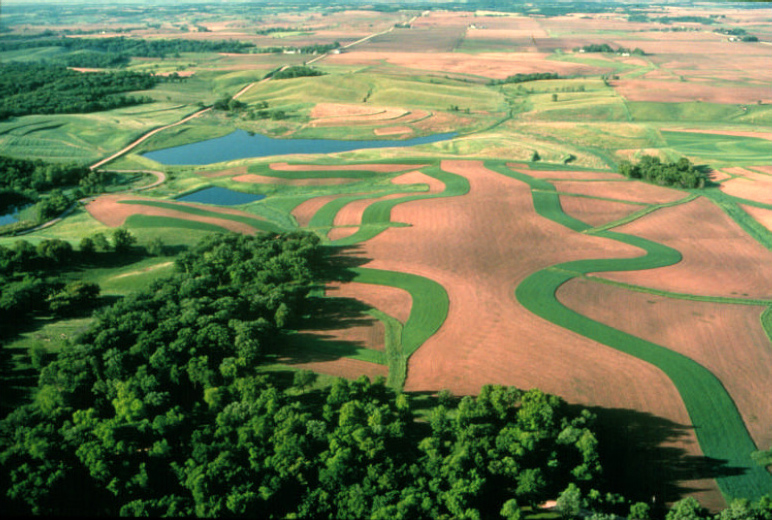
Contour buffer strips used to retain soil and reduce erosion.

A buffer strip is an area of land maintained in permanent vegetation that helps to control air quality, soil quality, and water quality, along with other environmental problems, dealing primarily on land that is used in agriculture. Buffer strips trap sediment, and enhance filtration of nutrients and pesticides by slowing down surface runoff that could enter the local surface waters. A specific subtype of buffer strips, Riparian buffers, are used to protect natural waterways affected by the land use.

Buffer strips mitigate runoff through plant life: root systems of the planted vegetation in these buffers hold soil particles together which alleviate the soil of wind erosion and stabilize stream banks providing protection against substantial erosion and landslides. Farmers can also use buffer strips to square up existing crop fields to provide safety for equipment while also farming more efficiently.

Buffer strips can have several different configurations of vegetation found on them varying from simply grass to combinations of grass, trees, and shrubs. Areas with diverse vegetation provide more protection from nutrient and pesticide flow and at the same time provide better biodiversity amongst plants and animals.

Many country, state, and local governments provide financial incentives for conservation programs such as buffer strips because they help stabilize the environment, help reduce nitrogen emissions to water and soil loss by wind erosion, while simultaneously providing substantial environmental co-benefits, even when the land is being used. Buffer strips not only stabilize the land but can also provide a visual demonstration that land is under stewardship.

== Types ==
=== Buffers within fields ===
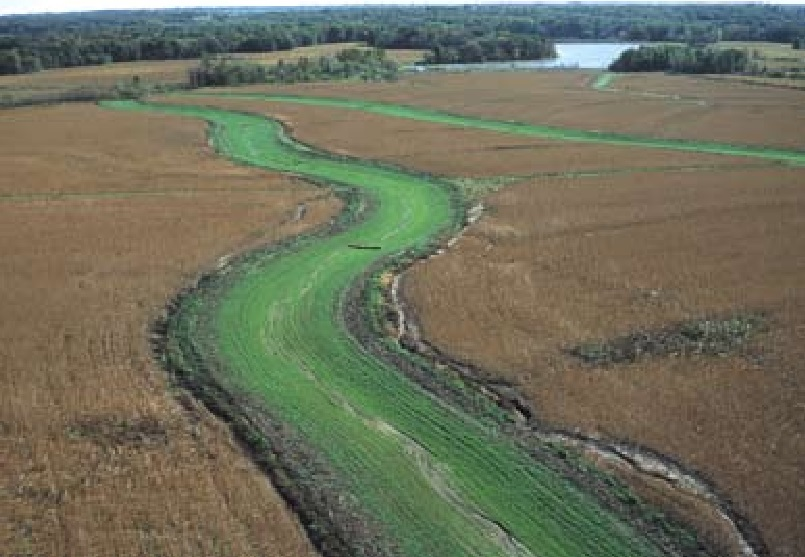
Grassed waterway through a field in Missouri

A grassed waterway reduces soil erosion and captures most nutrients and pesticides that would normally wash out of crop fields and into major waters. These waterways help to carry surface water at a non-erosive velocity to an area where it will have a stable outlet. Outlets must be adequate enough to allow water to drain without ponding or flooding the area being protected, while also preventing erosion of the water into the outlet which can be accomplished through the use of riprap. A limitation is during large runoff events, when soil is saturated, grassed waterways will have a very concentrated flow of water making them not as effective during high rainfalls. Grassed waterways require very little maintenance once they are introduced with major upkeep being mowing of the grass and reseeding. Farm machinery and cattle can cross these waterways but it may be hazardous during wet periods. One of the major disadvantages of waterways are actually getting them established. A late summer or early fall seeding when rainfall is minimal is recommended to allow the seed to have the best chance at establishing a root system.

Contour buffer strips are strips of perennial vegetation alternated with wider cultivated strips of cropland. This type of buffer strip is most effective when runoff water enters uniformly as sheetflow. They are very adapted to trapping pesticides and reducing rill erosion. These buffers need to be at least 15 feet (4.6 m) wide and make up for 20 to 30 percent of slope of an area. A lot of the time contour buffers can be used as a very inexpensive substitute for terraces. Most of the time a grass is selected that can be harvested during mid-summer. These buffers are not permanent and can be moved up and down hillsides from season to season in order to re-establish vegetation.

Vegetative barriers are narrower buffer strips of hardy, native, perennial grasses or shrubs planted in parallel rows to crops. They are very effective in reducing wind and water erosion which results in sediment trapping and water infiltration. They function in a similar fashion to a contour buffer strip, just much narrower.

=== Edge of field buffers ===
Field borders are bands or strips of perennial vegetation that is found on the edge of a cropland field. Field borders help with runoff only when it flows over the strip. They are very effective in benefiting spraying operations because they allow for extra room between adjacent fields. They also provide room for farming equipment to turn around. Field borders are effective in reducing wind and water erosion and provide great wildlife habitat.

Filter strips are areas of grass or other permanent vegetation that protect riparian areas from sediment runoff, pesticides, pathogens, organics and nutrients. These strips are very important in protecting stream banks and water quality. Filter strips work best when other conservation practices are used in order to drain water in their direction. Filter strips were originally used mostly in agriculture, but now are a common practice in urban areas where water quality has become an increasingly important issue.

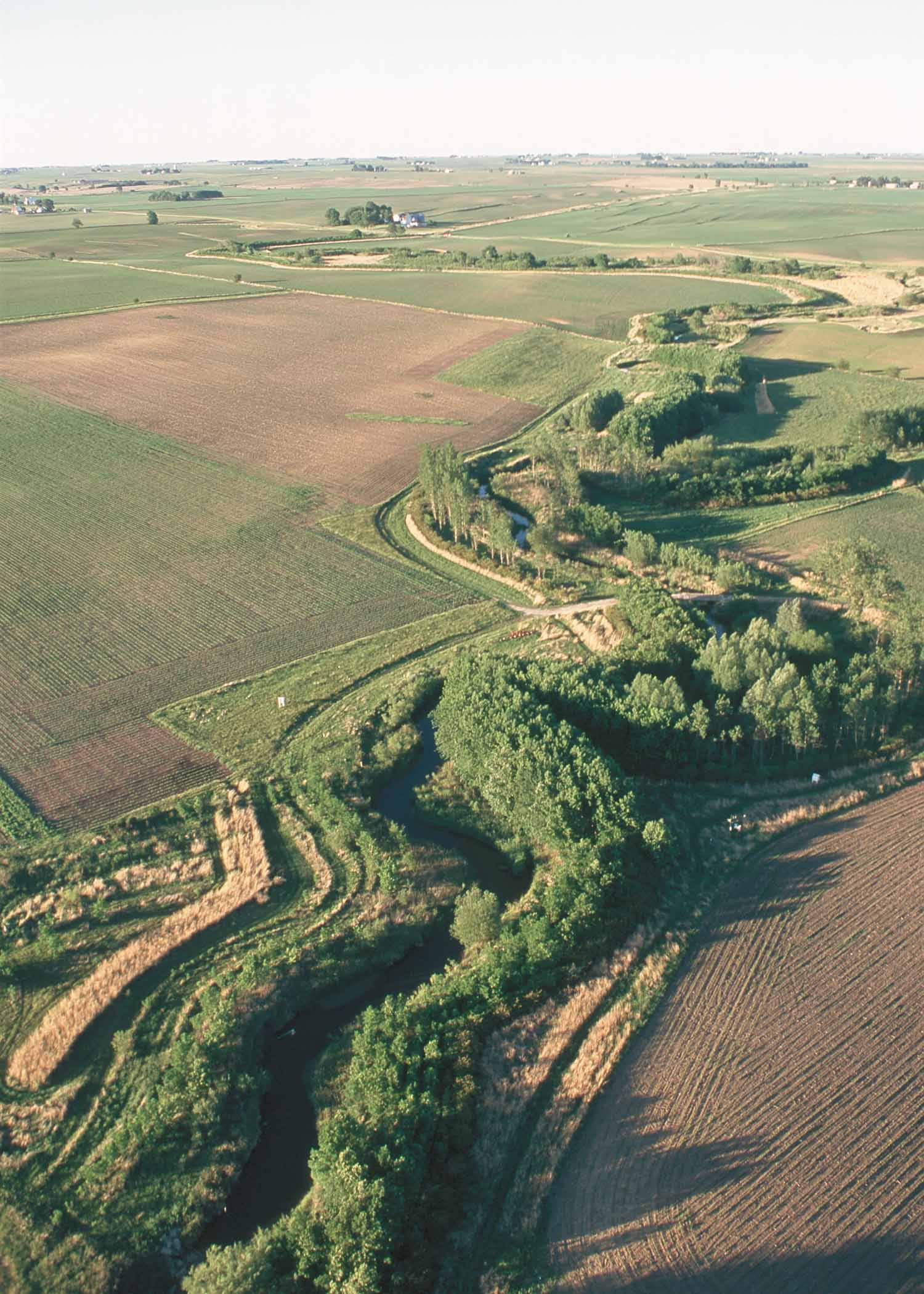
A riparian buffer of vegetation lining a farm creek in Story County, Iowa.

Riparian forest buffers are diverse communities of trees, shrubs and native perennial grasses. They are great for providing habitat for wildlife on land and in the water. Taller trees next to the streams help to lower water temperatures with shade which improves aquatic communities. The shrubs and grasses help to slow flooding and the larger trees can sometimes intercept nitrates before they reach the water with their deep roots.

Windbreaks act primarily to protect areas from wind causing erosion on the bare soil of croplands. Windbreaks can also serve as an area that separates fields and protects them from spray drift of pesticides.

== Wildlife habitat ==
Buffer strips are very important in helping to provide habitat for many species of wildlife in the open farm lands by causing an edge effect. With much of the land open on farms having an edge allows a safe-haven for animals to move between different ecosystems. Buffers are also helpful in conserving biodiversity especially to that of rare or endangered species through the incorporation of native grasses into their seeding by the landowner. Native grasses are especially important to pheasants, quail, chukar and songbirds because they provide the foods they need as well as the shelter from predators. Since most buffer strip areas have limited disturbance from farming it allows for a shelter to hide year round for many of the species including insects, birds, and mammals. When buffers run into and follow riparian areas along stream beds it is important to have larger vegetation like trees and shrubs that shade the water from the open sun. The water is then able to be cooler allowing for greater fish production and other aquatic plants and other biota to thrive in a less disturbed environment.

This area of vegetation following a body of water is noted as a riparian zone. These buffer areas often incorporate large trees that protect stream banks from excessive erosion and shade aquatic areas. The shade provided by the larger trees reduces water temperatures and light intensity from ultraviolet light. Debris including leaves and branches that fell from trees, often contain aquatic invertebrates important to the structure of the water following the "River Continuum" concept. Since the riparian zones contain a larger variety of plants the overall diversity is much greater as well. With more photosynthesis and higher amounts of available water plant primary production can increase in turn creating more potential food for the wildlife.

== Planted vegetation ==
The USDA shows that grassed waterways of less than 5% slopes for a chosen waterway will greatly reduce velocity of draining water within the land. The Natural Resources Conservation Service (NRCS) offers the use of an online Soil survey to view the area of land to be planted and examine slope and soil drainage. As viewed by the Natural Resources Conservation Service, soil drainage is the number one priority for location of certain grasses. Poorer drainage causes less infiltration of water into the soil as groundwater recharge causing ponding and flooding of surrounding crops. Higher drainage becomes more droughty which hinders the establishment of certain grasses good for waterways. Medium soil drainage becomes the most suitable for planting. Determining exact grasses and seed amounts to plant follows specifications of a local NRCS Field Office Technical Guide and the Contour Buffer practice standard while taking practice on land and regional environmental conditions into consideration.

The NRCS has shown contour strip cropping provides the greatest effectiveness when slopes of the area are within 4-8%. For greater success in lowering the erosion, contour strips on the slopes need to follow the contours of the landscape. Row crops like corn, legumes, or soybeans should alternate strips of small grains or forages to successfully limit erosion and slowing or capturing the runoff of fertilizers and pesticides. Tests from the NRCS have shown that the smaller tighter rooted grasses and hays provide more surface cover to prevent rain and wind erosion while slowing runoff, increasing infiltration, and trapping sediment from the high erosive row crops. Proper planting of the contour crops is important for higher success of erosion control to protect highly fertile topsoil.

== See also ==
- Agroecology
- Biodiversity in agriculture
- Erosion control
- Filter strip
- Nonpoint source pollution
- Riparian buffer
- Riparian zone restoration
- Soil conservation
- Sustainable landscapes
- Strip farming
- Wildflower strip
- Wildlife corridor
- Windbreak
