= Rainwater harvesting in the Sahel =

Sub-Saharan agricultural water management

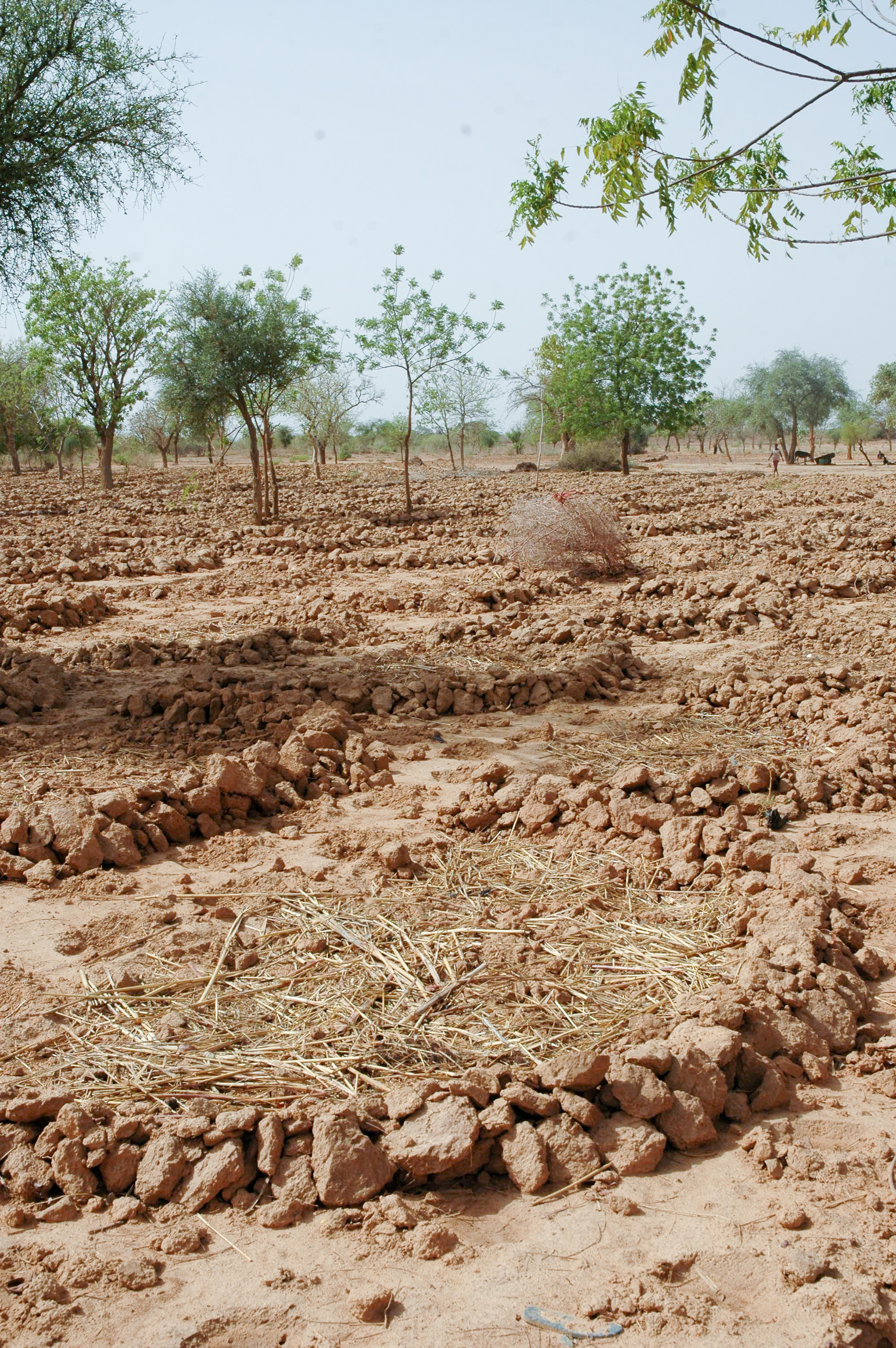
Planting pits, Niouma near Yako, Passoré Province, Burkina Faso

Rainwater harvesting in the Sahel is a combination of "indigenous and innovative" agricultural strategies that "plant the rain" and reduce evaporation, so that crops have access to soil moisture for the longest possible period of time. In the resource-poor drylands of the Sahel region of Africa, irrigation systems and chemical fertilizers are often prohibitively expensive and thus uncommon: so increasing or maintaining crop yields in the face of climate change depends on augmenting the region's extant rainfed agriculture systems to "increase water storage within the soil and replenish soil nutrients." Rainwater harvesting is a form of agricultural water management. Rainwater harvesting is most effective when combined with systems for soil regeneration and organic-matter management.

== Background ==
Landscape gradient of the Sahel, photographed from space

The Sahel is an ecologically (rather than geopolitically) defined region of Africa. The noun Sahel comes from the Arabic sāḥil (Arabic: ساحل) describing a border, shore or edge, which aptly describes the transitional areas of Africa where savanna becomes the hyper-arid Sahara Desert. (According to the Concise Oxford Dictionary of World Place Names, "The Arabs considered the Sahara to be a huge ocean with the Sahel as its shore.") The Sahel crosses Senegal, The Gambia, Mauritania, Mali, Burkina Faso, Ghana, Niger, Nigeria, Cameroon, Chad, Central African Republic, South Sudan, Sudan, and Eritrea in a belt up to 1,000 km (620 mi) wide that spans 5,400 km (3,360 mi) from the Atlantic Ocean in the west to the Red Sea in the east. The Sahel is marked by decreasing levels of precipitation from south to north, but what defines a dryland ecosystem is not necessarily low rainfall. In some cases the dryness is due to persistent high levels of evaporation (due to heat or desiccating winds). Unpredictable rainfall is often also a factor.

The Sahel
- The Sahara The Sahel Sub-Saharan Africa

Population estimates of the Sahel vary depending on which political subdivisions are included, but the count is in the vicinity of 100 million people, including nearly a million refugees and internally displaced people. The countries of the Sahel region are mainly poor. For example, the Volta River basin is occupied by about 20 million people who live in the countries of Burkina Faso and Ghana; 61 percent of Burkinabe and 45 percent of Ghanaians live on less than US$1 per day. About 12 million farmers in the region (including people in Niger, Chad, Mauritania, Mali, and probably Burkina Faso and Senegal), are occasionally or "chronically vulnerable to food and nutrition insecurity." The Brookings Institution has described Sahelians as among the "most underprivileged, marginalized, and poorest people" on Earth.

=== Subsistence food production ===
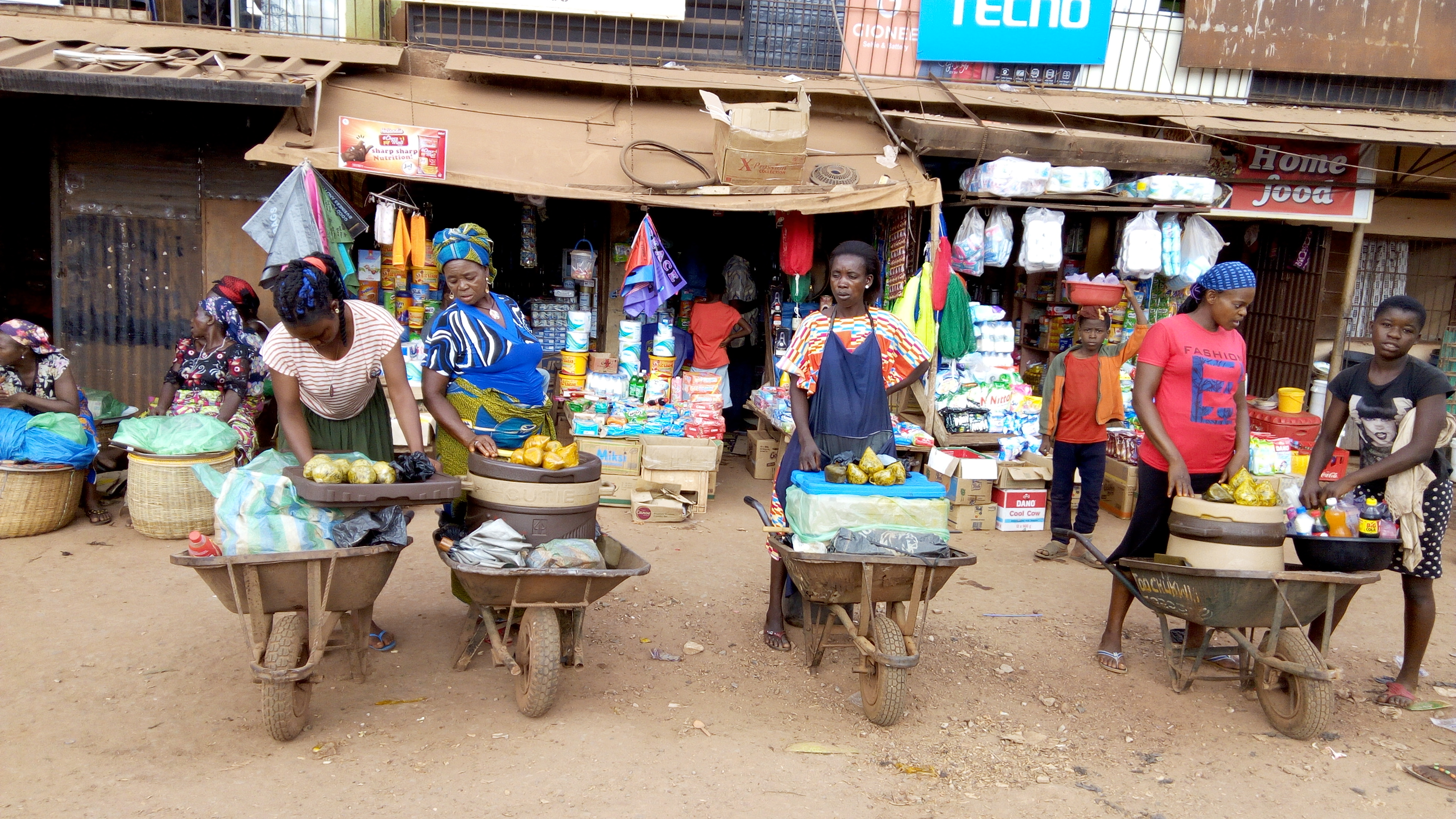
Irrigation in the Sahel tends to be reserved for cash crops like groundnuts; these Nigerian women are selling okpa made from groundnuts.

Agriculture contributes between 10 and 70 percent of GDP to the economies of most sub-Saharan countries. The major agricultural systems of the Sahel are oasis, pastoral, and mixed production of cereals and root crops. The root crops are predominantly sweet potato and cassava; cereals are predominantly millet and sorghum, with some maize; the "north-south rainfall gradient defines...a successive north-south dominance of millet, sorghum and maize." Climate changes over the next 25 years are predicted to decrease Sahelian cereal production by double-digit percentages, largely due to increased heat. The Intergovernmental Panel on Climate Change also predicts double-digit decreases due to increased rainfall variability.

Homegrown staple crops account for an estimated 90 percent of food consumption in the Sahel, and 90 percent of these crops are grown using exclusively rain-fed agriculture. A general African transition to first-world-style irrigation systems is considered unlikely, and the Sahel region has an "especially limited irrigation potential." According to the United Nations Food and Agriculture Organization, no more than 10 percent of African food production is likely to be grown under irrigation over the next 20 years. Mechanized irrigation, where it exists, is typically limited to more lucrative cash crops, rather than subsistence. Therefore, in order to increase or even maintain the Sahel's dryland agriculture production capacity the "most logical strategy...will be improving rainfed productivity for most staples."

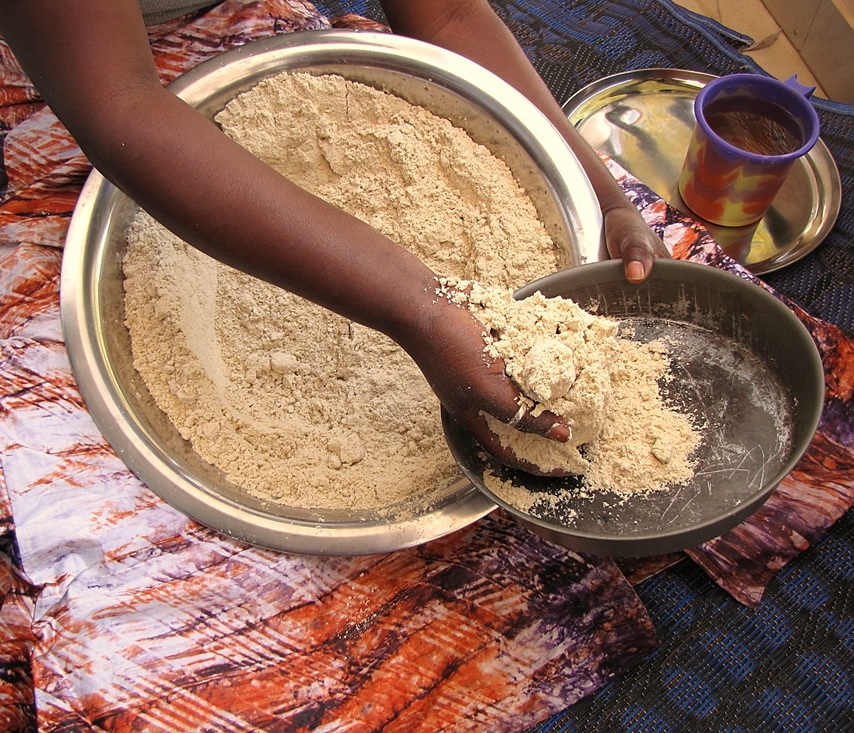
Freshly ground millet flour ready for millet couscous or millet porridge; millet, a staple ingredient for cuisines across the arid and semi-arid Sahelian climatic zone, goes by many local names: in Wolof, soungouf, in French, farine de mil.

=== Rainfall and fertility ===
Precipitation patterns and soil quality are "key constraint[s]" in Sahelian food production. Rainfall levels are both generally low to start with and "highly variable" to complicate matters. This variability is a common cause of crop failure due to unpredictable "onset and distribution" of rainfall; cereal yields are impacted by the start date and duration of the rain as much as by the absolute quantity. The majority of the year is the dry season, which ends with harmattan winds blowing dust south from the Sahara; rain usually falls between one and four months of the year, from June through September.

Soils in the Sahel are typically degraded, often "crusty, abandoned agricultural lands" and "particularly poor in organic carbon." In Burkina Faso, one-third of all land is degraded. The human-induced structural damage to soils wrought by intensive 20th-century agriculture methods "is especially evident during droughts when the land is stripped bare of vegetation and erosive winds and water take their toll." In addition to the toll of soil and wind erosion on old fields, the practices of burning or removing crop residues, and a shift to fewer or no fallowing periods due to increased population density (and commensurate increased need to cultivate all accessible land) have contributed to further decreases in natural fertility.

The Sahel is dappled with "unproductive crusty patches" found on "old dunes, sandy plains, colluvial slopes, and alluvial terraces." These "glazed" patches are regionally known as glacis and are found, for example, on approximately 60 percent of all degraded land in Niger. "Glacis" describes a slope made particularly slippery, for whatever reason, and is related to the Old French glacier. Glacis patches in the Sahel are more or less impermeable; rainwater runs off or evaporates, further immiserating the soil biome, and thus the plants and the people.

=== Climate change ===
Even before the full impact of climate change is felt in the Sahel, the region struggles with challenges including "unsustainable management strategies, weak economies, weak infrastructure, 'inappropriate resource tenure', inappropriate interventions (such as eucalyptus plantations), [and] ineffective institutions." The future of the Sahel is insecure. Climate change impacts will be variable but there is a "likelihood of negative impacts in most locations from increased temperatures, greater rainfall variability, and more extreme weather events."

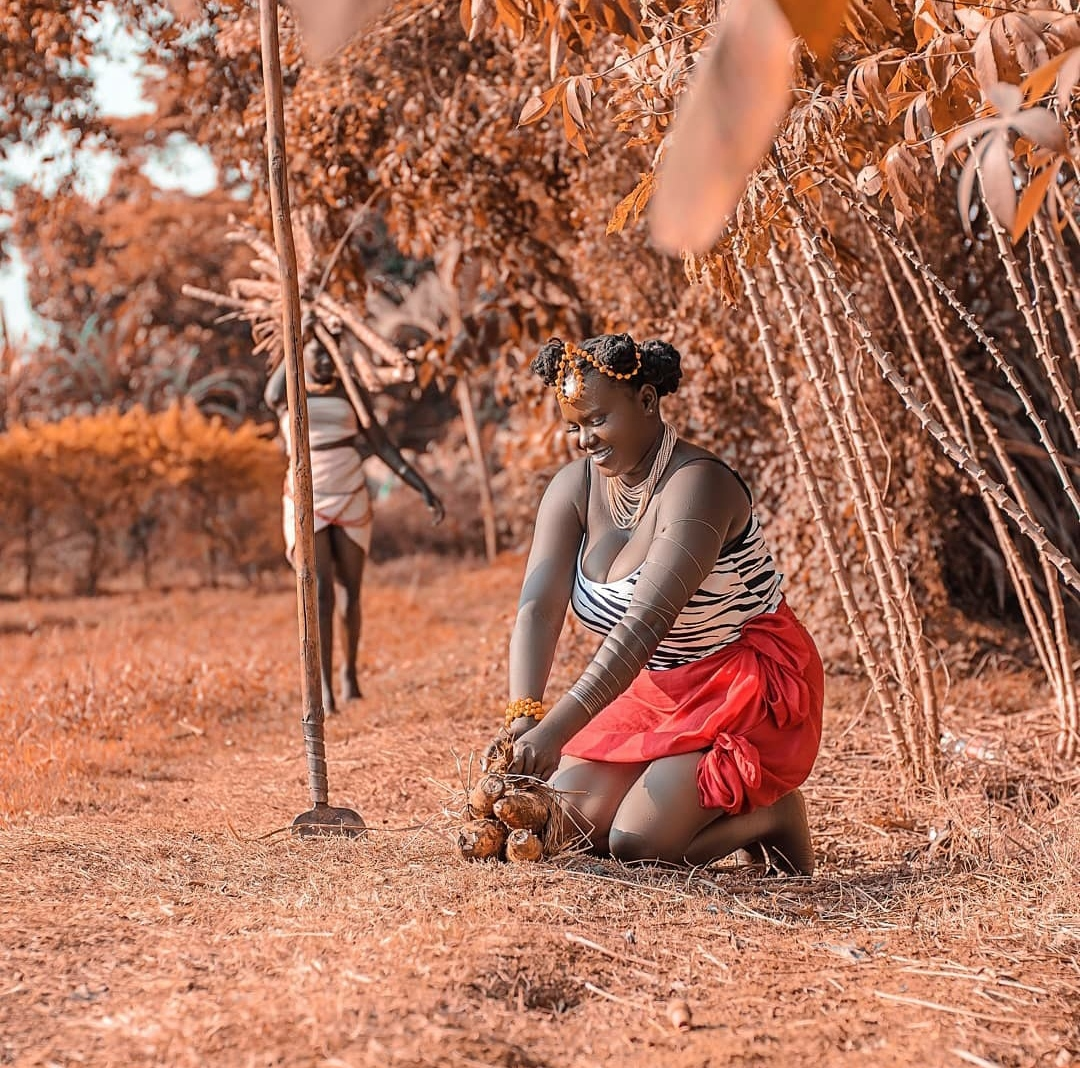
In South Sudan, a mother harvests the root crop cassava while her daughter collects firewood.

== Rainwater harvesting techniques of the Sahel ==
The purpose of rainwater harvesting in the Sahel and other dryland eco-agricultural regions is to extend the usability of irregular water inputs. Banking rainwater (through techniques often summarized by the epigram "slow it, spread it, sink it") is possible with site-appropriate techniques and as more water becomes "available for ecosystems...their capacity to perform their functions is improved." Furthermore, soil restoration is possible and would potentially open up more than 700,000,000 acres (280,000,000 ha) of land in Africa for additional cultivation, which could in turn reduce deforestation for agricultural uses. Niger has implemented several of these techniques on a wide scale beginning in the 1980s and has recovered approximately 250,000 ha (620,000 acres) of degraded land.

Benefits of rainwater harvesting (especially on a community scale) include additional drinking water for animals, land reclamation opportunities, higher soil fertility, accelerated growth of timber for firewood, and reinforcement of a virtuous cycle pattern leading toward additional rainfall (trees make rain). Any or all of the following techniques reduce water runoff and thus increase soil water storage, generally yielding about two to three times more growth than crops grown in the same regions/conditions under a more conventional system. One study found that appropriately managed Sahelian rainwater-harvesting techniques increased runoff retention up to 87 percent, doubled water infiltration rates, and extended the crop-growing season up to 20 days.

=== Bouli ===
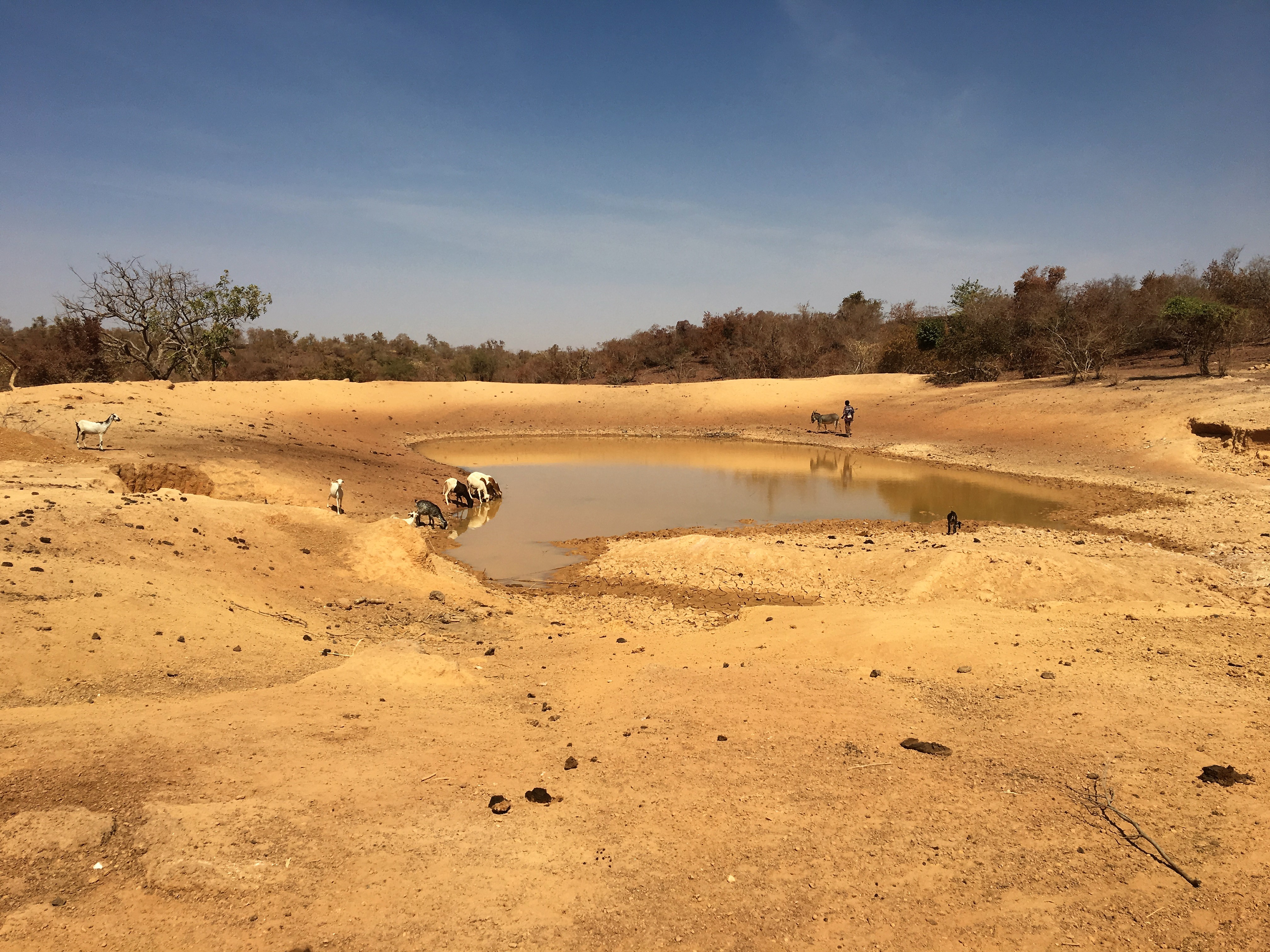
Bouli in Rambo-Wottionma, Burkina Faso

A bouli is a small-scale artificial pond dug "where there is convergence of runoff" at the midpoint or bottom of a slope. This water tends to last for two or even three months into the dry period after the monsoon. In addition to supplying additional water for livestock and vegetable gardens the bouli "can recreate an ecosystem favourable to the life of the fauna and the local flora, boosting recharge of water tables during droughts and allowing vegetation to grow even during the dry period." Bouli may be the most poorly studied of the rainwater harvesting techniques appropriate for the Sahel, as there are relatively few studies about the mechanics and benefits of this system.

=== Bunds ===
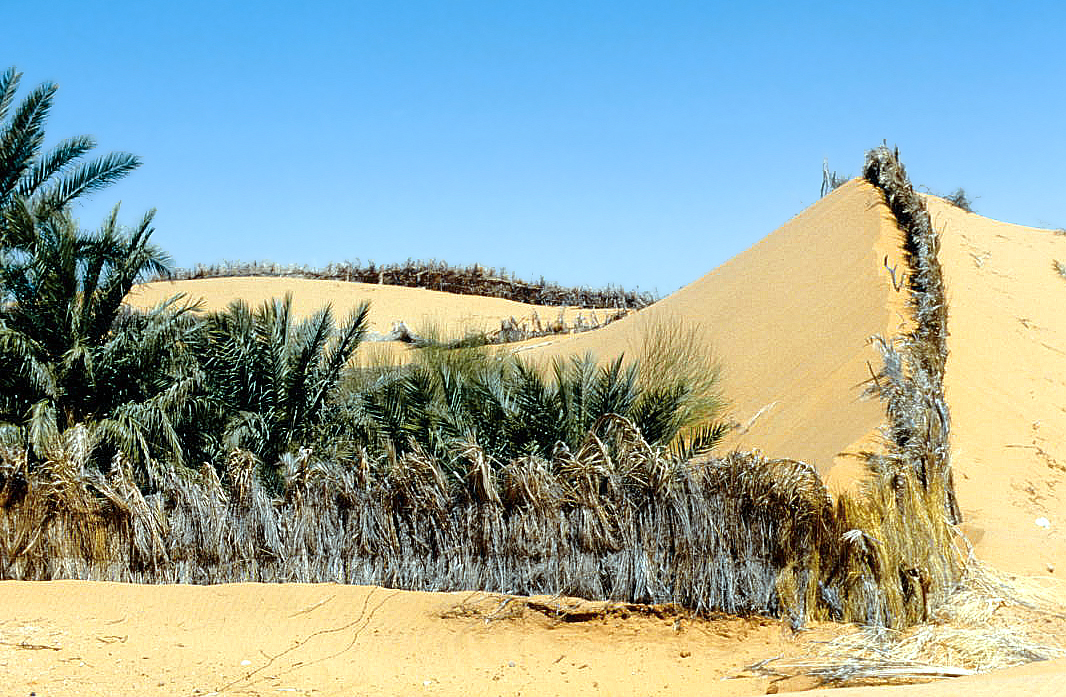
Barrier to slow down the advance of sand dunes in the outskirts of Chinguetti, Adrar, Mauritania

Mauritian farmers build weirs to trap windblown sand during the dry season and during the "infrequent rains" these weirs serve to minimize water runoff and maximize groundwater recharge; the stone rows (French: cordons pierreux) of Burkina Faso, Mali, and Niger function by similar principles. Stone rows, also called bunds, are a traditional and widely used means of land improvement in the Sahel. Laid out on contour, stone rows minimize soil erosion but also minimize rainwater runoff and offer favorable microclimates. Bunds not laid out in parallel with the natural contours of the land may result in "some gully formation during rainy periods." Bunds can also be made of earth, which was the original practice that preceded the use of stone. Bunds may be laid out up to 30 meters apart and may themselves be planted with indigenous vegetation such as Andropogon gayanus or Piliostigma reticulatum.

Both earth and stone bunds are prone to material deterioration over time and demand periodic maintenance; as a general rule, the more stones used the more stable the row. Projet d'aménagement des terroirs et conservation des eaux (PATECORE) popularized the three-stone system for building more durable, animal-disturbance-resistant stone rows, in which one large stone is placed atop three smaller stones.

=== Demi-lunes, or half-moons ===
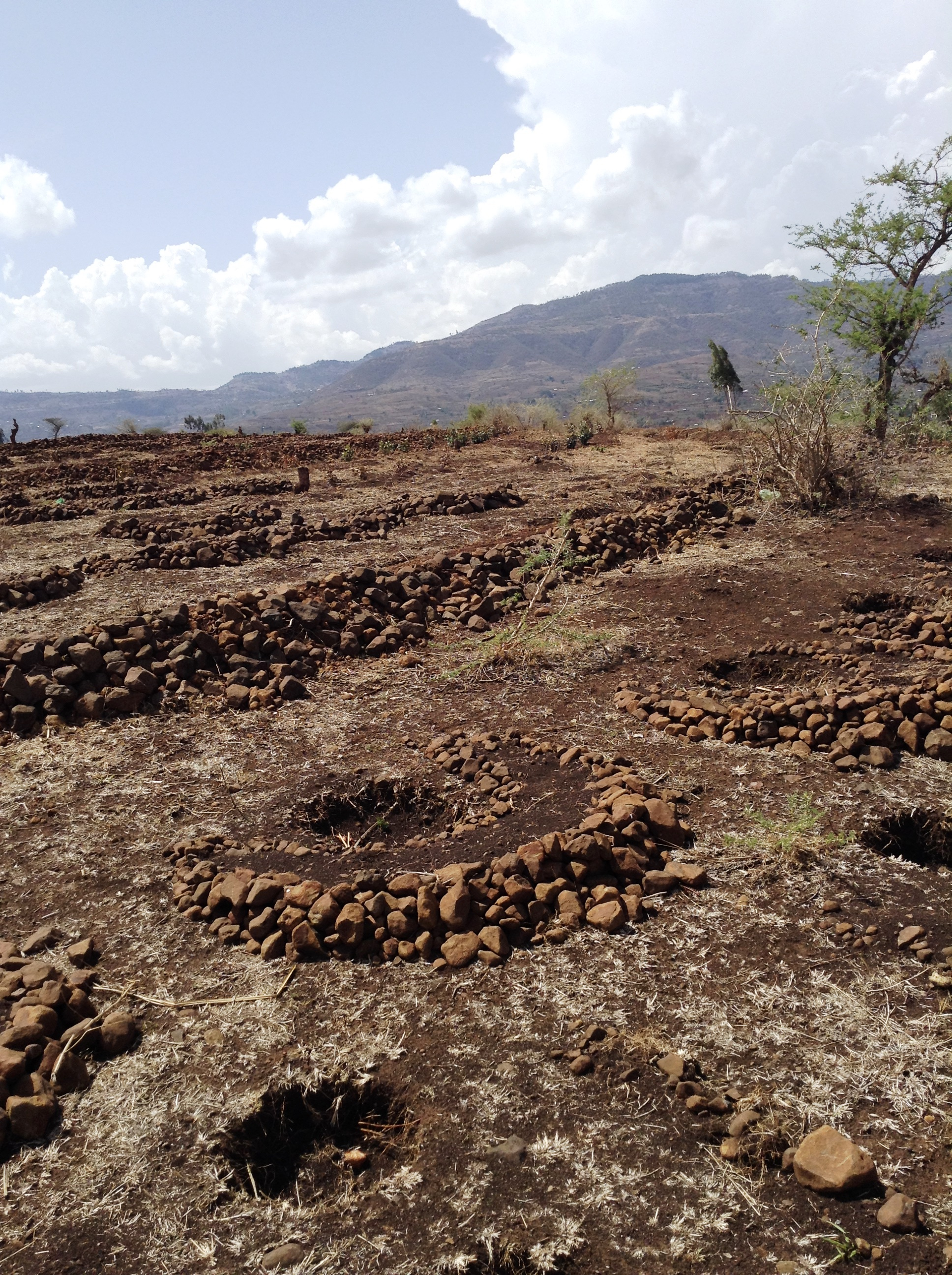
Stone bunds and demi-lunes constructed on a farm in Ethiopia

Half-moons, which are known as demi-lunes through much of the Sahel because of the French colonial influence on regional languages, are a widely used traditional form of semi-circular planting pit. Half-moons are formed by digging a hole up to four meters across but somewhat shallower in depth, and "placing the removed earth on the downhill side." Half-moons are particularly useful for remediating the more or less impermeable glacis soils. These edged planting pits capture and hold organic matter and moisture. The accumulated detritus in turn attracts termites and other invertebrates whose actions create passages and pores in the organic matter, building humus, and permitting better water infiltration. Half-moons have been shown to reduce the risk of crop failure and increase agricultural productivity, especially with the use of "complementary inputs" such as animal manures.

Half-moons, however, are extremely labor-intensive: "constructing just one takes several hours" and the preparation of the planting areas must be done during the dry season when the ground is very hard and the heat may be severe. According to one account based on interviews with Sahelian farm families, "preparation of [one hectare of demi-lunes] amounts to two to four person-months of work, and yearly maintenance of approximately one-person month is required."

=== Zaï, or tassa ===
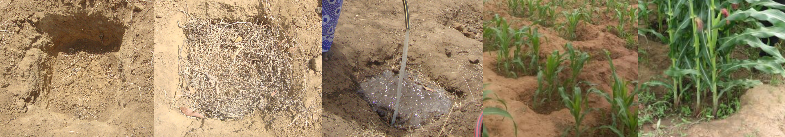
Zaï pit

A zaï is a "water pocket" and is another indigenous planting method, developed in the Yatenga. The word comes from the Moré language, and means something like "getting up early and hurrying out to prepare the soil" or even "breaking and fragmenting the soil crust before sowing." Tassa is the Hausa language word for this concept. A similar practice in the Yako region is called guendo. Similar to half-moons, but smaller, zaï are usually 24 to 40 cm wide, 10 to 25 cm deep, spaced about 40 cm apart in a grid across the field. Zaï are usually established with "two handfuls" of organic matter in the form of animal manure, crop residues, or a composted combination of the two. These pits were traditionally used on a small scale to remediate degraded zipélé lands but are now being used on much larger plots. Zaï are best-suited for use in areas that see "isohyets of 300 and 800 mm rainfall." Zaï have been shows to increase yields between 2.5 and 20 times normal, "depending on the crop."

As with half-moons, the major drawback of zaï is in the hundreds of man-hours that are necessary to build them. Families must either have a large number of fit and able-bodied workers, or "pay for the services of the young people's association."

=== Other techniques ===
Other beneficial and successful practices in the Sahel include:

- Living hedgerows
- Straw mulching
- Coppicing/pollarding rather than cutting down trees wholesale, ideally leaving two or three shoots for regrowth
- Paddock systems for grazing animals
- Tied ridges, a planting system that looks a Belgian waffle

== Obstacles to implementation ==
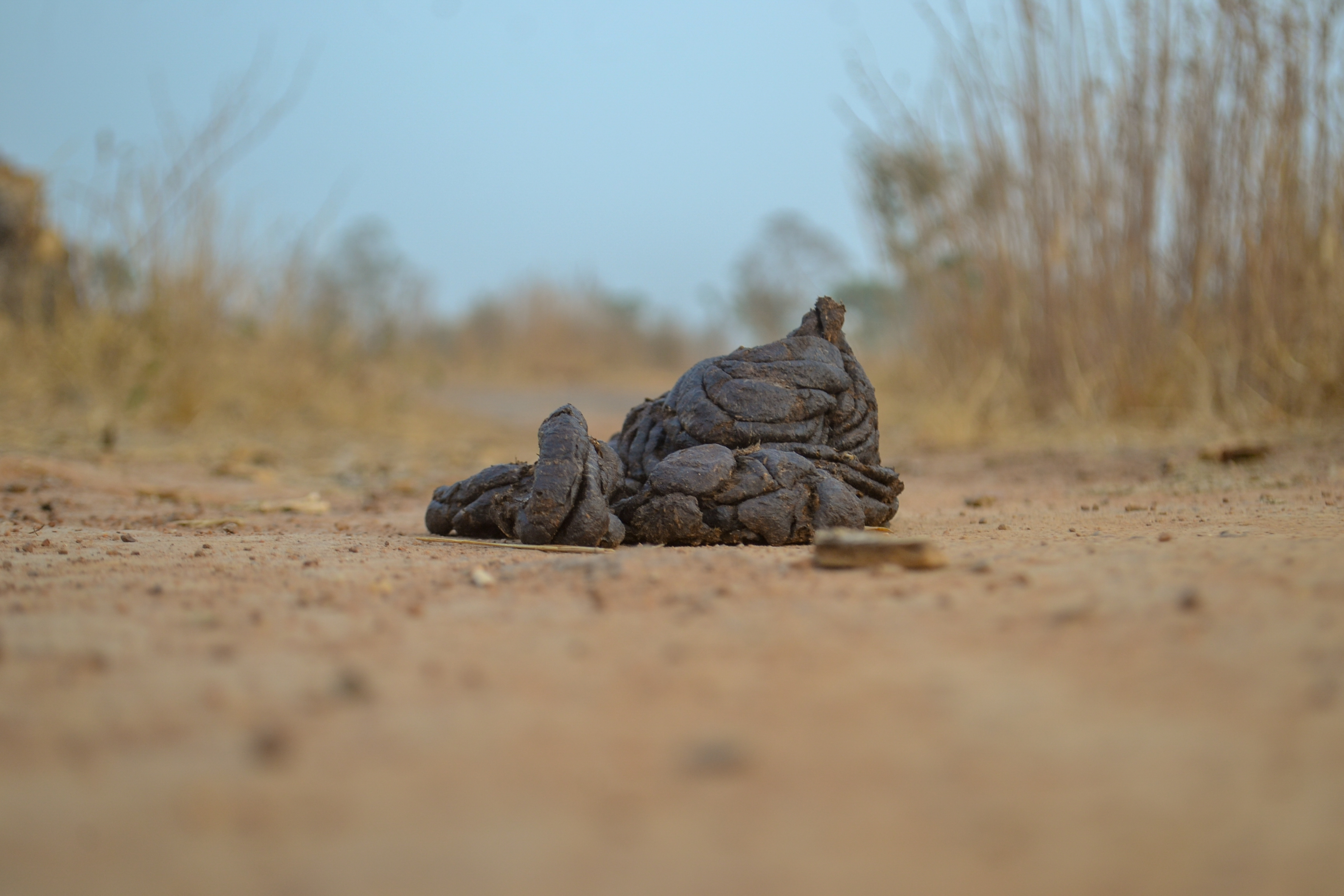
Dried cow dung near Katari, Nigeria; in some cases a shortage of nitrogen-rich animal manures is a limiting factor on establishing zaï and demi-lunes

Landscape of Mopti Region, Mali, in 1972, a period of severe Sahel drought

Widespread adoption of rainwater harvesting techniques in the Sahel is so far limited by a number of factors including a high upfront cost for labor. The massive quantity and weight of stones needed to establish bunds is often prohibitive. It is estimated that 40 long tons (41,000 kg; 90,000 lb) of rock are needed to establish stone rows for just one hectare of arable land. Other limits include lack of knowledge about these techniques and the absence of training programs.

In the words of one development analyst, "agricultural water management strategies have been over-studied, over-promoted, and over-funded. However, despite the efforts of numerous projects, water scarcity still limits agricultural production of most of the smallholder crop-livestock farmers of the basin and cereal yields are still lying far below their potential." One study found that village training programs, "a low-cost policy intervention," were highly effective in increasing uptake of rainwater harvesting techniques.

== Additional images ==
Rainwater harvesting in the Sahel
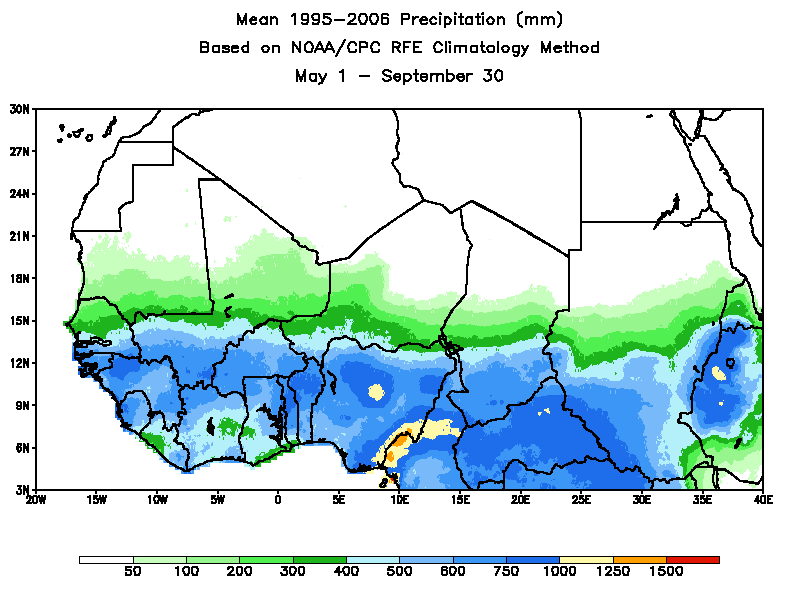
Annual rainfall in the Sahel

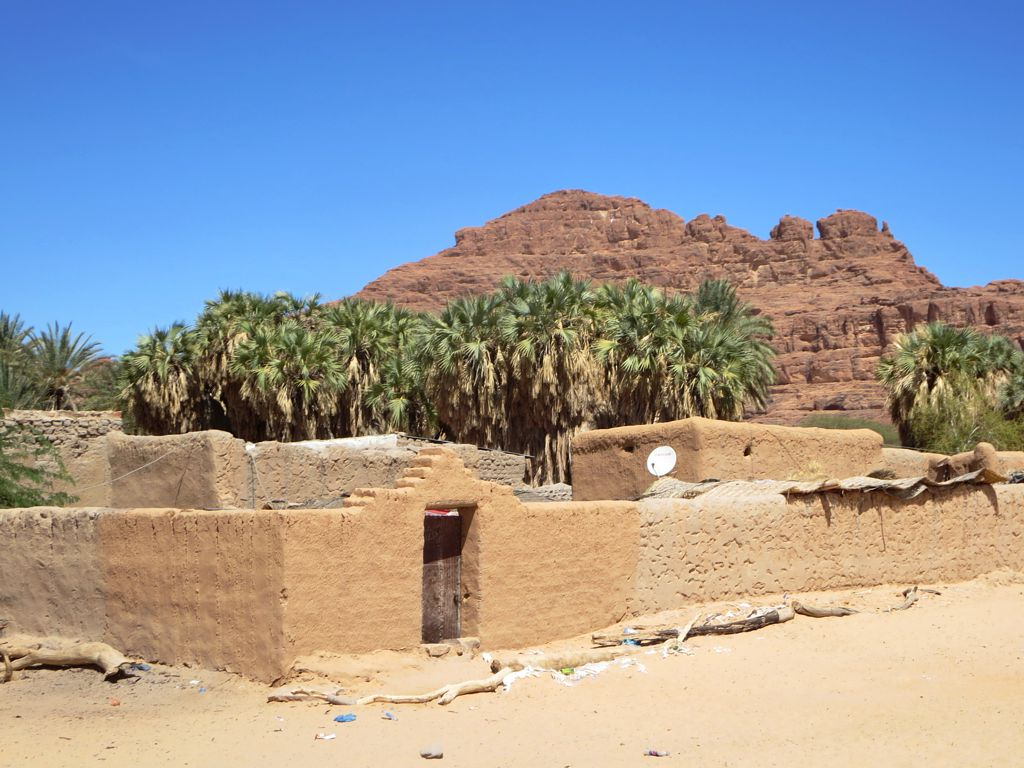
Example of an arid pastoral-oasis agricultural system in Fada, Chad

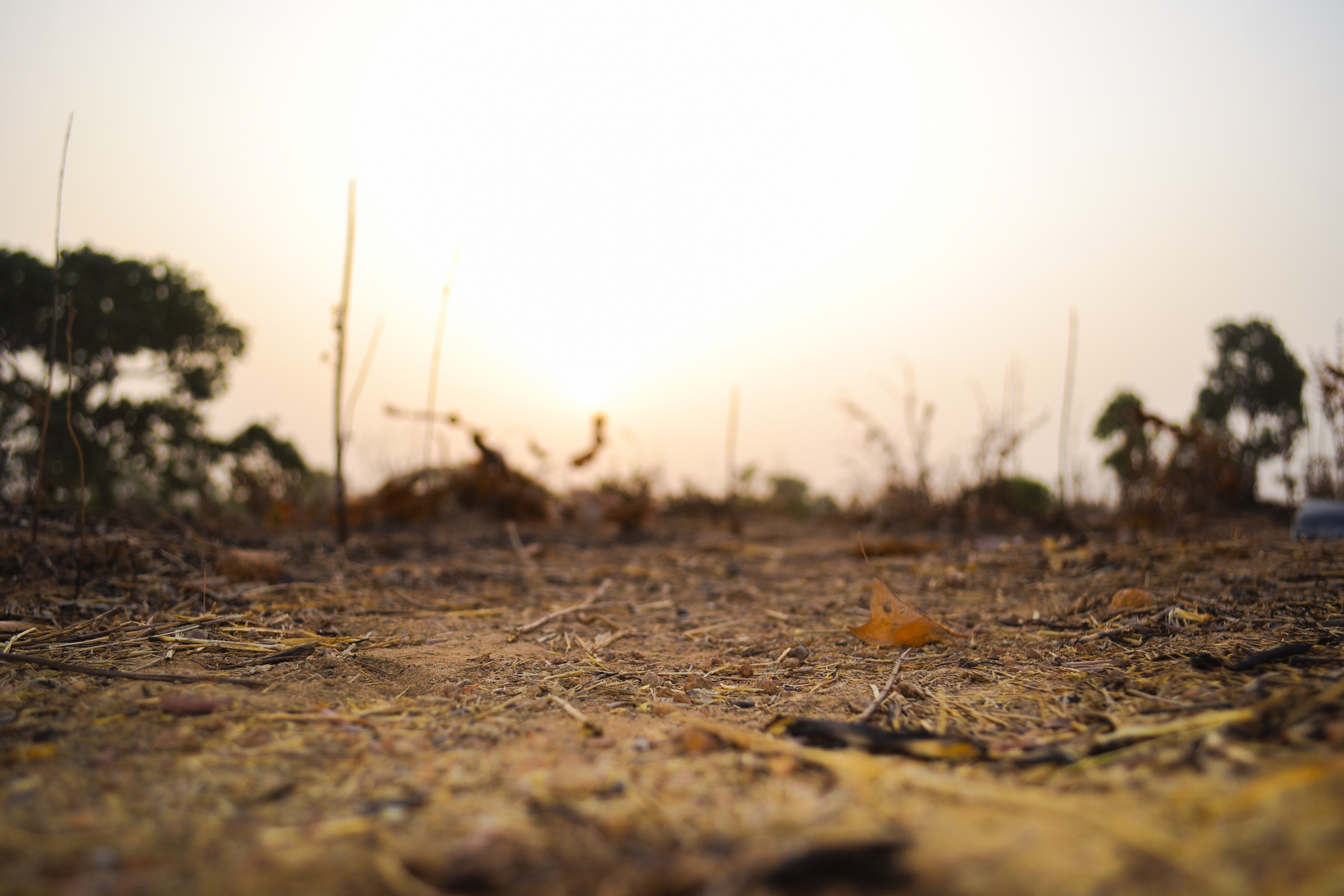
View of the horizon with the harmattan coming on

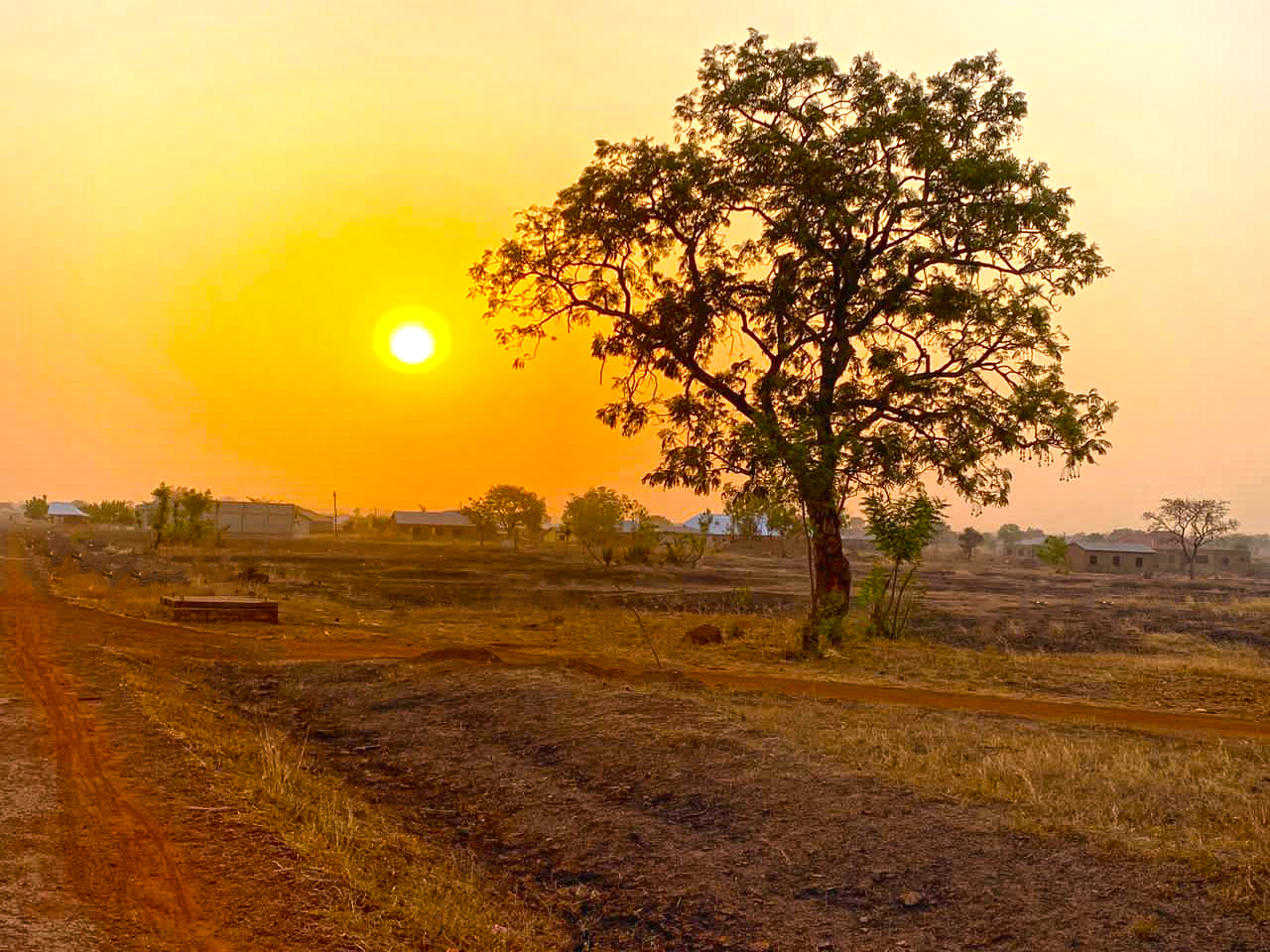
"Dawadawa Tree in Clean and Beautiful Environment," Ghana

== See also ==
- Effects of climate change on agriculture
- Farmer-managed natural regeneration
- Contour trenching
- Spreading ground
- Anthrosol
  - Dark earth § West Africa
  - Terra preta
- Fertilizer tree § Use in Africa
- Oasification
- Afforestation
- Water scarcity in Africa
- Water conflict in the Middle East and North Africa
- Environmental issues in Africa

== Bibliography ==
- Aker, Jenny; Jack, Kelsey (November 2021). "Harvesting the Rain: The Adoption of Environmental Technologies in the Sahel" (PDF). National Bureau of Economic Research Working Papers (29518). Cambridge, MA: National Bureau of Economic Research. doi:10.3386/w29518.
- Akuffobea-Essilfie, Mavis; Williams, Portia Adade; Asare, Roland; Damman, Sigrid; Essegbey, George Owusu (2019). "Promoting rainwater harvesting for improving water security: Analysis of drivers and barriers in Ghana". African Journal of Science, Technology, Innovation and Development. 12 (4): 443–451. doi:10.1080/20421338.2019.1586113. S2CID 146630754.
- Barry, B.; Olaleye, A.O.; Zougmoré, R.; Fatondji, D. (2008), Rainwater Harvesting Technologies in the Sahelian Zone of West Africa and the Potential for Outscaling, International Water Management Institute Working Papers, Colombo, Sri Lanka, ISBN 978-92-9090-684-1
- Davies, Jonathan; Barchiesi, Stefano; Ogali, Claire J.; Welling, Rebecca; Dalton, James; Laban, Peter, eds. (2016). Water in drylands: Adapting to scarcity through integrated management (PDF). Gland, Switzerland: IUCN. doi:10.2305/IUCN.CH.2016.06.en. ISBN 978-2-8317-1803-3. Archived (PDF) from the original on 2023-02-12.
- Douxchamps, S.; Ayantunde, A.; Barron, J. (2012). Noel, Rajesh (ed.). Evolution of Agricultural Water Management in Rainfed Crop-Livestock Systems of the Volta Basin (PDF) (Report). CPWF R4D Working Paper Series 04. Design and layout by Janet Pontin. Colombo, Sri Lanka: CGIAR Challenge Program for Water and Food (CPWF). Archived (PDF) from the original on 2023-03-06.
- Jost, Stéphane; Sidibé, Brahima; Magha, Mohamadou; Perret, Christopher (January 2009), "Climate Change in West Africa: Sahelian Adaptation Strategies" (PDF), Sahel and West Africa Club (OECD), SWAC Briefing Note, no. 3, Paris, archived (PDF) from the original on 2022-09-01
- Mengistu, Abay Tafere (28 January 2021). Kuk, Yong In (ed.). "How Small-Scale Farmers Understand Rain Water Harvesting Technology? Evidence from Northern Ethiopia". The Scientific World Journal. 2021: 1–7. doi:10.1155/2021/8617098. ISSN 1537-744X. PMC 7861931. PMID 33574735.
- Tabor, Joseph A. (May 1995). "Improving crop yields in the Sahel by means of water-harvesting". Journal of Arid Environments. 30 (1): 83–106. Bibcode:1995JArEn..30...83T. doi:10.1016/S0140-1963(95)80041-7 – via ResearchGate.
- Tamagnone, Paolo; Cea, Luis; Comino, Elena; Rosso, Maurizio (2020). "Rainwater Harvesting Techniques to Face Water Scarcity in African Drylands: Hydrological Efficiency Assessment". Water. 12 (9): 2646. Bibcode:2020Water..12.2646T. doi:10.3390/w12092646. hdl:2183/26667.
- Ward, Christopher (2016). Improved agricultural water management for Africa's drylands. A World Bank study. Raphael Torquebiau and Hua Xie. Washington, D.C.: World Bank Group. doi:10.1596/978-1-4648-0832-6. hdl:10986/24816. ISBN 978-1-4648-0833-3. Archived from the original on 2020-03-07.
