= Yacouba Sawadogo =

Burkinabè farmer (1946–2023)

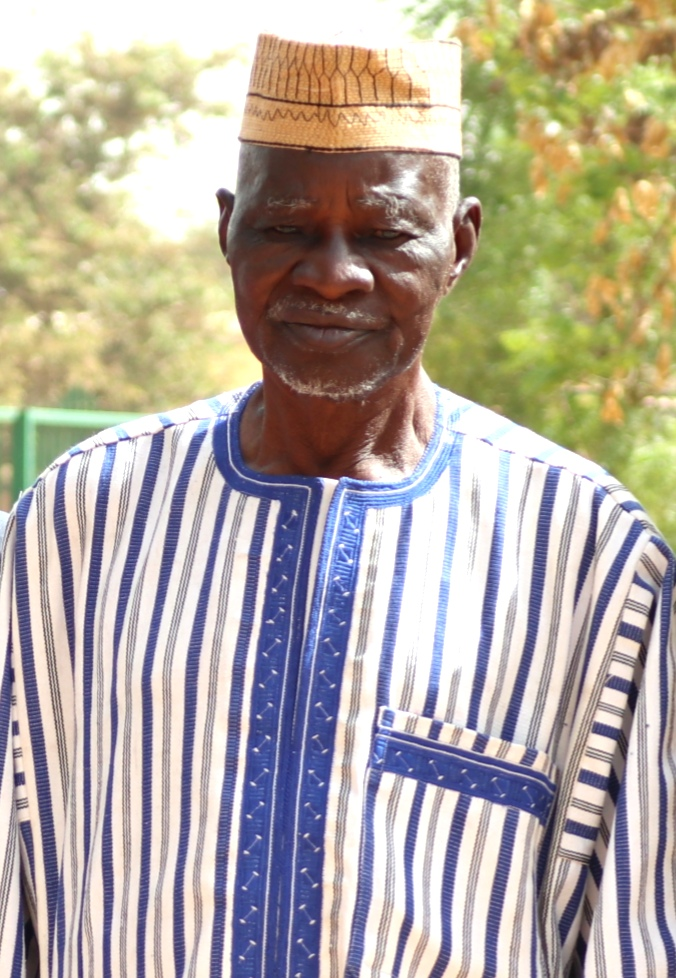
- Sawadogo in 2019
- Born: Yacouba Sawadogo; 1946; Gourga, French West Africa (today in Yatenga Province, Burkina Faso)
- Died: 3 December 2023 (aged 76–77); Ouahigouya, Burkina Faso
- Occupations: Farmer; agronomist
- Years active: 1970s–2023
- Movement: Zaï
- Awards: Right Livelihood Award (2018); Champions of the Earth (2020)

Zaï, Batodi, Tajaé, Nigeria (June 2012)

Yacouba Sawadogo (1946 – 3 December 2023) was a Burkinabé farmer and agronomist who successfully used a traditional farming technique called zaï to restore soils damaged by desertification and drought. Such techniques are known by the collective terms agroforestry and farmer-managed natural regeneration.

A 2010 documentary feature film, The Man Who Stopped the Desert, first screened in the UK, portrays his life.

Sawadogo was a native speaker of Mossi. In 2018, he was awarded the Right Livelihood Award. In 2020, he was awarded the Champions of the Earth award.

Sawadogo died on 3 December 2023 at age 77.

== Background ==
The northern portions of Burkina Faso fall in the Sahel Belt, a semi-arid region between the Sahara Desert to the north and tropical savannas further south. The region periodically suffers from drought. The most recent major drought occurred from 1972 to 1984, resulting in a famine which killed hundreds of thousands of people.

One effect of the drought was widespread desertification. Combined with other factors such as overgrazing, poor land management, and overpopulation, the drought led to a substantial increase in barren land, particularly on slopes, due to the comparative difficulty of cultivating sloping land. Uncultivated, the soil experienced increased erosion and compaction. Such practices also led to an annual one-metre reduction in the water table in the 1980s.

== Soil rehabilitation ==
Together with Mathieu Ouédraogo, another local farm innovator, Sawadogo began experimenting with techniques for rehabilitating damaged soil in the 1970s. He relied on simple approaches traditional to the region: cordons pierreux and zaï holes. Both Sawadogo and Ouédraogo engaged in extension and outreach efforts to spread their techniques throughout the region.

=== Cordons pierreux ===
Cordons pierreux ("stony cordons") are thin lines of fist-sized stones laid across fields whose purpose is to form a catchment. When rain falls, it pushes silt across the surface of the field, which then fetches up against the cordons. Slowing down the flow of water gives it more time to soak into the earth. The accumulated silt also provides a comparatively fertile spot for seeds of local plants to sprout. The plants slow the water even further in and their roots break up the compacted soil, thereby making it easier for more water to soak in.

=== Zaï holes ===
Zaï holes take a slightly different approach to catch water. They are holes dug in the soil. Traditionally, they were used in a limited way to restore barren land. Sawadogo introduced the innovation of filling them with manure and other biodegradable waste in order to provide a source of nutrients for plant life. The manure attracts termites, whose tunnels help break up the soil further. He also increased the size of the holes slightly over the traditional models. Zaï holes have been used to help cultivate trees, sorghum, and millet.

From the mid-1980s until 2009, the use of zaï has also led to the water table levels rising by about 5 metres (16 ft) on average, and as much as 17 metres (56 ft) in some areas.

=== Outreach ===
To promote these methods, particularly zaï holes, Sawadogo held twice yearly "Market Days" at his farm in the village of Gourga. Attendees from over a hundred regional villages came to share seed samples, swap tips, and learn from one another.

The process was supported by the Dutch scientist Chris Reij (World Resources Institute) and OXFAM UK.

== Government conflict and protection ==
Over more than two decades, Sawadogo's work with zaï holes allowed him to create a forested area of 62 acres (250,000 m^{2}), which led both to a struggle with the government regarding ownership and right to the land, as well as a later protection measure from the government. The forested area is clearly visible on satellite images east of the hospital and is called Bangr-Raaga in Mossi, which means Forest of Wisdom. Subsequently, this area was annexed by the nearby city of Ouahigouya under the auspices of a government program to increase city revenues. Under the provisions of the program, Sawadogo and his immediate family members are each entitled to one tenth of 1 acre (400 m^{2}) out of the plot and did not receive any other compensation.

In 2008, Sawadogo was attempting to raise US$20,000 to purchase the land. The following year, he was attempting to raise €100,000 because land was now valued at €100,000 from his increased work to fertilizing the lands.

In 2012, settlers reached the edge of the wood and began erecting the first buildings in the forest in 2019. The authorities reported about an ongoing administrative procedure to protect the land as municipal heritage.

A protective fence for the whole forest was inaugurated on 18 June 2021 in the presence of Burkina Faso's Minister of Environment.

== See also ==
- 2010 Sahel famine
- Permaculture
