= Zaï =

Sahelian farming technique

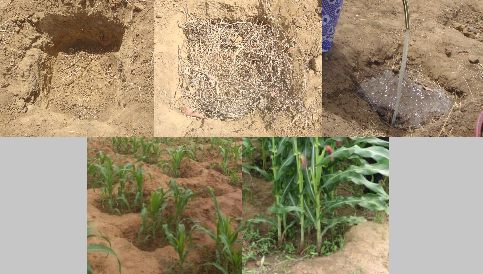
Zaï pit process

Zaï in Batodi, municipality of Tajaé, Niger

Zaï or tassa is a farming technique of digging pits in less permeable soil to catch water and concentrate compost. The pits are between 15 and 50 centimetres (0.5 and 2 ft) across and around 5 to 15 centimetres (2 to 6 in) deep, spaced approximately 80 centimetres (3 ft) apart. The technique is traditionally used in western Sahel (Burkina Faso, Niger, Mali) to restore degraded drylands and increase soil fertility. The technique has also been adopted by smallholder farmers in semi-arid regions of East Africa, particularly in Kenya, where farmers in counties such as Kitui use it in combination with modern agricultural practices to improve water retention and crop yields in dryland conditions.

Zaï holes were reintroduced since the 1980s by Yacouba Sawadogo, a farmer from Burkina Faso, who introduced the innovation of filling them with manure and compost to provide plant nutrients. The manure attracts termites, whose tunnels help further break up the soil. He also slightly increased the size of the holes over the traditional models. Zaï holes help by improving the yields of trees, sorghum, and millet by up to 500 percent.

As an alternative to the zaï technique, some agricultural engineers suggest using a diking technique, especially in the case of very light soils.

== See also ==
- Farmer-managed natural regeneration (FMNR)
- Regenerative agriculture
- Hügelkultur
- Semicircular bund
- Great Green Wall (Africa)
