= Tony Rinaudo =

Australian agriculturalist

Tony Rinaudo AM
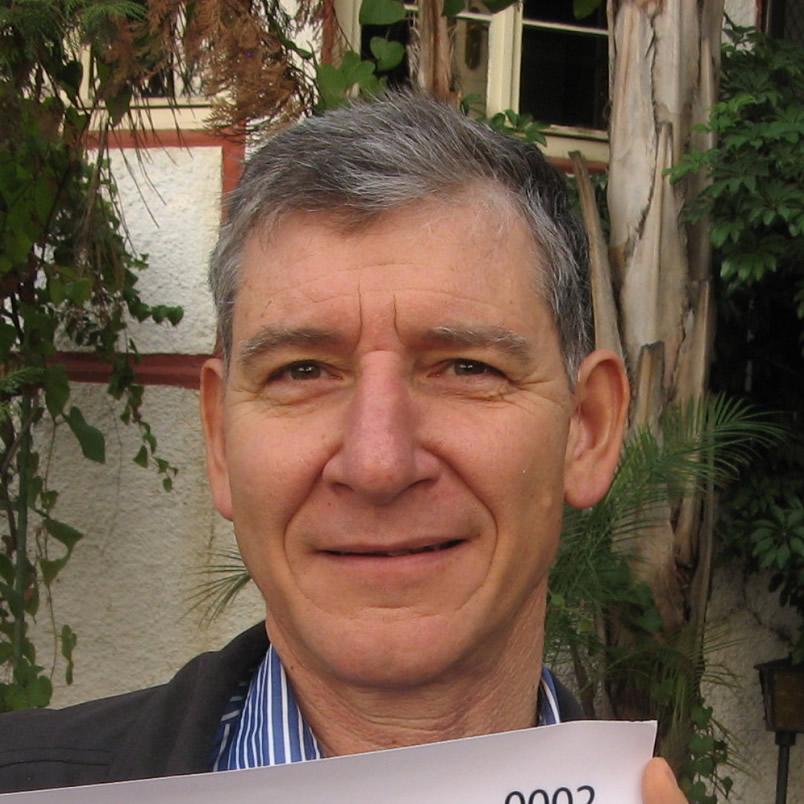
- Born: 19 January 1957 (age 69); Wangaratta, Victoria, Australia
- Citizenship: Australian
- Occupation: Agriculturist
- Spouse: Eliabeth Rinaudo
- Children: 4
- Awards: Commandeur du Merit, Agricole (Niger); Right Livelihood Laureate 2018; Member of the Order of Australia 2019

Anthony Thomas Rinaudo (born 19 January 1957) is an Australian agriculturist and missionary.

== Early life and education ==
Tony Rinaudo was born in the northern Victorian town of Wangaratta and raised in nearby Myrtleford.

After completing high school he studied at University of New England, Armidale (Bachelor of Rural Science) and later at the Bible College of New Zealand (Bible in Missions course).

== Career ==
Following university and Bible college, Rinaudo served initially at a farm school/preparatory Bible college in Maradi, Niger, and later in the Maradi Integrated Development Project with the Sudan Interior Mission, now known as SIM from 1981 to 1999.

Since 1999 he has worked for World Vision Australia in several roles, initially as a program officer and now as principal climate action advisor.

Rinaudo is the subject of a 2022 documentary by German filmmaker Volker Schlöndorff called The Forest Maker, which was shown at the Film Without Borders film festival in Bad Saarow Germany in 2022.

== Achievements ==
Rinaudo served as an agriculturalist and missionary with "Serving in Mission" in Niger Republic from 1981 to 1999. There, he oversaw long-term rural development and periodic, large-scale relief programs. In this Sahel region of Niger, where tree-planting efforts were failing, he "discovered root systems remained alive underground, even in the harshest, desert-like landscapes. To encourage the 'underground forest' to grow into trees, he just needed to prune and manage the tree shoots. He inspired farmers to carry on this work over the years. Rinaudo's pioneering technique is called Farmer Managed Natural Regeneration, or FMNR." The FMNR website describes the technique as a "low-cost land restoration technique used to combat poverty and hunger amongst poor subsistence farmers by increasing food and timber production and resilience to climate extremes". He consequently earned the nickname "the Forest Maker". At the UN's global climate talks in Katowice, Poland, in 2018, it was recognised that "6M hectares of land have been regenerated under FMNR, totalling 240M trees [and that] the reforestation of the landscape can be seen on satellite images from space".

Through these he contributed to a transformation in how Nigerians farm, and the reforesting of over six million hectares of land, which still inspires re-greening movements globally. For his 18 years of service to humanity and the environment, the government of Niger awarded him its highest honour for an expatriate, the Order of Agriculture with Merit (Merite Agricole du Niger).

Since joining World Vision Australia in 1999, Rinaudo has initiated and/or oversaw important land regeneration projects, worldwide. Serving now as principal climate action advisor, he promotes forestry and agro-forestry initiatives globally within the World Vision partnership, and beyond, including in East Timor and Ethiopia.

== Awards ==
- Commandeur du Merit, Agricole awarded by the Government of Niger for his contribution to environmental restoration and services to humanity. This is the "highest decoration which Niger bestows on expatriates, for his contribution to environmental restoration and services to humanity".
- 2018 Right Livelihood Award (Alternate Nobel) "for demonstrating on a large scale how drylands can be greened at minimal cost, improving the livelihoods of millions of people"
- Member (AM) of the Order of Australia, 2019, "For significant service to conservation as a pioneer in international reforestation programs"
- FMNR was recognised by the World Future Council under the Outstanding Practice in AgroEcology 2019.
- 24th Fervent Global Love of Lives Award 2021, awarded by the Chou, Ta-Kuan Cultural & Educational Foundation, Taiwan ROC
- Victorian 2024 Australian of the Year nominee
- 2025 Luxembourg Peace Prize for Outstanding Environmental Peace

== Recognition ==
Rinaudo is listed as a contributor to natural resource management and conference speaker by organisations around the world:

- European Leadership Forum
- Global Earth Repair Foundation
- Global Evergreening Alliance
- Global Landscapes Foruum
- Initiatives of Change Switzerland
- Institute for the Study of Christianity in an Age of Science and Technology (ISCAST)
- Permaculture Research Institute
- Reforestation World
- TEDx Sydney 2023
- The Blue Tribe Company
- United Nations Department of Economic and Social Affairs

== Published works ==
=== Books ===
- Autobiography The Forest Underground: Hope for a Planet in Crisis (2022) - ISCAST ISBN 0645067113, ISBN 978-0645067118 (Awarded Australian Christian Book of the Year 2022). The book is the subject of book reviews, a radio interview and an interview in conservation news web portal Mongabay. After launching in Melbourne earlier in 2022, Rinaudo launched the book in his home region of north east Victoria on 21 August 2022. In 2023, an audiobook version of The Forest Underground, narrated by Tim Dehn, was produced and launched by ISCAST in partnership with the Australian audiobook production company, Voices of Today.
- eBook Unsere Bäume der Hoffnung (2021) - Rüffer & Rub Sachbuchverlag ISBN 978-3-906304-66-3 Volker Schlöndorff (Préface), Tony Rinaudo (Auteur), Dennis Garrity (Auteur), Corinna von Ludwiger (Traduction)

=== Articles ===
- Rinaudo, T (1992), The use of Australian Acacias in the Maradi Integrated Development Project, in House, APN and Harwood, CE (Editors), Australian Dry Zone Acacias for Human Food, pp. 82–92. Canberra, Australian Tree Seed Centre, CSIRO Division of Forestry. 145 pp.
- Rinaudo, T., Burt. M and Harwood, C. (1995). Growth and seed production of Australian Acacia species at Maradi, Niger. ACIAR For. Newsl. 19:1-2.
- Rinaudo, T. (2001). Utilizing the underground forest. Farmer Managed Natural Regeneration of trees. pp. 325–336. In: D. Pasternak and A. Schlissel (eds.), Combating Desertification with Plants. Kluwer Academic/Plenum Publishers, New York.
- Rinaudo, T; Patel, T. and Thompson, L.A.J. (2002), Potential of Australian Acacias in combating hunger in semi-arid lands, Conservation Science W. Aust. 4 (3) : 161–169
- Rinaudo, T and Cunningham, P.J. (2008). Australian acacias as multi-purpose agro-forestry species for semi-arid regions of Africa. Muelleria 26(1): 79-85.
- Cunningham, P.; Nicholson, C.; Yaou, S.; Rinaudo, Tony; Harwood, Christopher (2008) Utilization of Australian acacias for improving food security and environmental sustainability in the Sahel, West Africa, https://www.researchgate.net/publication/255457447
- Griffin, A.R.; Midgley, S.J.; Bush, D.; Cunningham, P.J.; Rinaudo, A.T. (2011), Global uses of Australian acacias – recent trends and future prospects, Diversity and Distributions, (Diversity Distrib.) 17, 837–847
- Tougiani A, Guero C, Rinaudo T (2009), Community mobilisation for improved livelihoods through tree crop management in Niger. GeoJournal 74:377-389
- Bacaller, S. with Rinaudo, T. (20 June 2023). The Forest Maker: In Conversation with Tony Rinaudo. Eureka Street online.

=== Presentations ===
- Rinaudo, Tony (2023), An Underground Forest: a solution to restoring degraded land at our feet, TEDxSydney

== Biography ==
- Johannes Dieterich (editor) (2018), Tony Rinaudo - the Forest Maker, Rüffer & Rub Sachbuchverlag. ISBN 3906304361 ISBN 978-3906304366
