= Semicircular bund =

Rainwater harvesting technique

A semi-circular bund (also known as a demi-lune, half-moon or Earth smiles) is a rainwater harvesting technique consisting in digging semi-lunar holes in the ground with the opening perpendicular to the flow of water. These techniques are particularly beneficial in areas where rainfall is scarce and irregular, namely arid and semi-arid regions. Semi-circular bunds primarily serve to slow down and retain runoff, ensuring that the plants inside them receive necessary water.

== Background ==
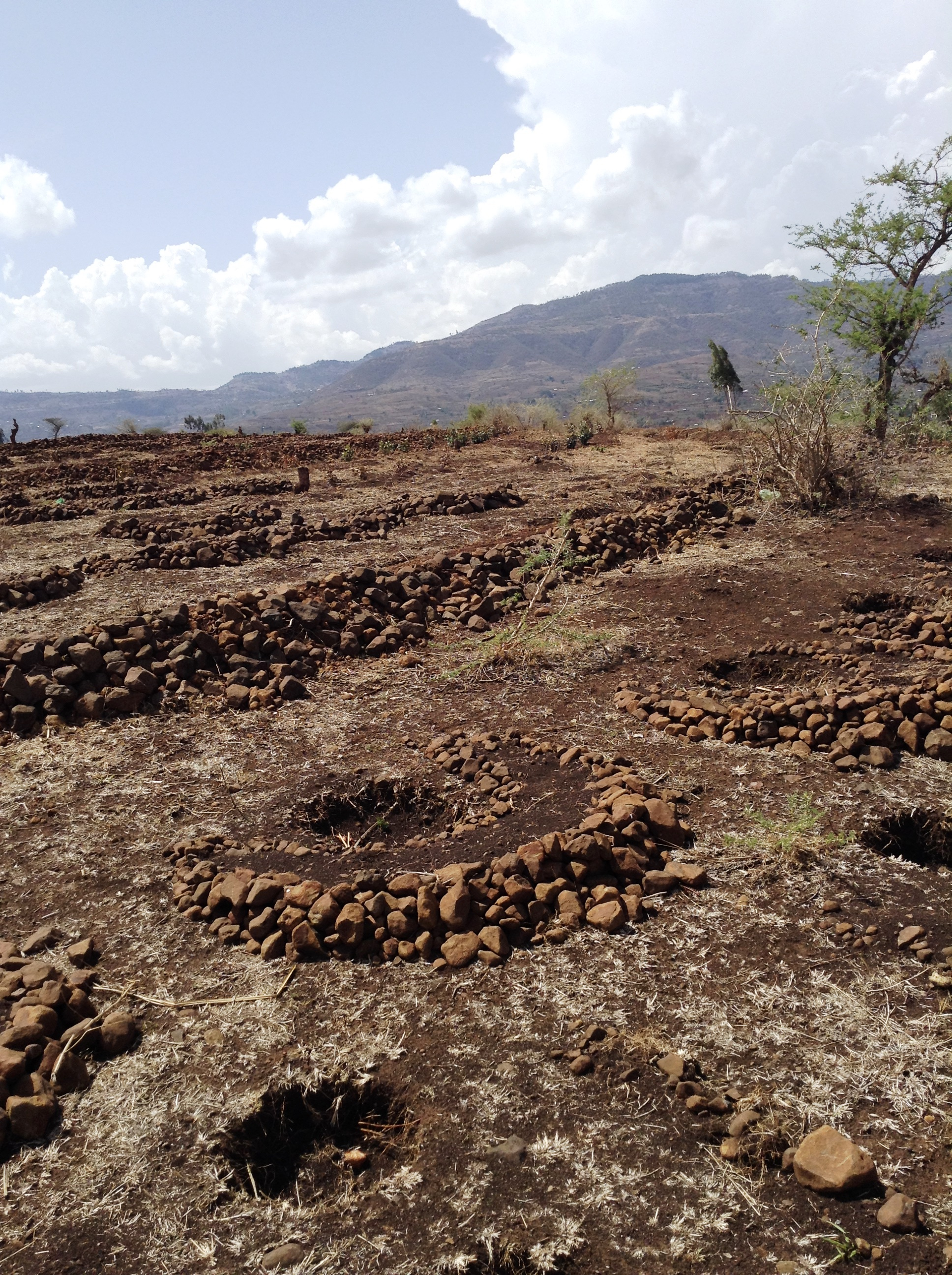
Semi-circular bunds in Ethiopia

Crop cultivation, grazing, and forestry are particularly challenging in drylands. Local communities often lack the financial and practical resources to establish irrigation systems or use chemical fertilizers. As such, these are generally considered infeasible solutions for these areas. As a result, rainfall harvesting techniques are widely adopted to efficiently retain rainwater while minimizing the need for additional materials and financial investment.

There are various rainfall harvesting techniques, all sharing the fundamental principle of constructing or excavating structures using natural materials such as soil and stones. These techniques include planting pits, infiltration basin and microbasins, and cross-slope barriers. Semi-circular bunds fall in the subcategory of microcatchment water harvesting. Beyond their primary function of reducing runoff for agricultural purposes, these methods offer additional benefits, such as providing extra drinking water for livestock, enabling land reclamation, enhancing soil fertility, accelerating timber growth for firewood, and influencing regional atmospheric patterns, potentially leading to increased precipitation.

== Origins and recent development ==
Semi-circular bunds have a long history as a response to the challenges of water scarcity and soil erosion in dry climates. The use of semi-circular bunds can be traced back to traditional farming practices in various parts of the world, especially in Africa and the Middle East. In these areas, local communities developed and refined the technique over generations as a way to improve agricultural productivity and restore degraded lands. While the practice has ancient roots, semi-circular bunds gained significant attention in the scientific and development communities during the latter half of the 20th century, especially in the Sahel region of the Africa continent. As climate variability and land degradation intensified in this area, these structures became an important tool for land rehabilitation and agricultural improvement. Research conducted in the early 21st century has further validated the effectiveness of semi-circular bunds in improving soil properties, increasing vegetation cover, and enhancing biodiversity in arid and semi-arid ecosystems.

== Structure and mechanism ==
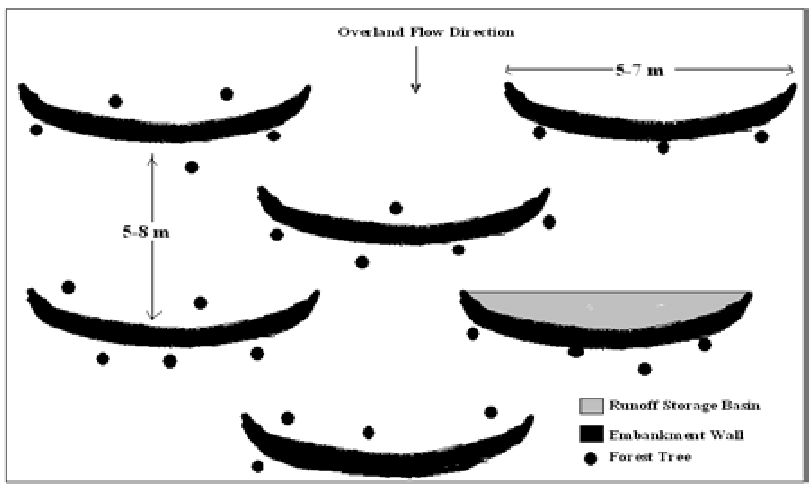
Schematic map of semi-circular bund structure in a case implementation in Iran

Semi-circular bunds are pits dug in a semi-circular shape, with the excavated material (earth and stone) accumulated along the edges. They usually have a diameter of 2-8 meters (up to 12 meters) and are 30-50 cm high. The bunds are arranged in a staggered pattern across a plot, meaning that runoff flowing between structures in one row is captured by the row below, and so forth. The catchment-to-cultivated area (C:A) ratio varies between 1:1 and 3:1. They are generally implemented on slopes of up to 15%, though earthen bunds are rarely used on slopes steeper than 5% when annual rainfall exceeds 300 mm. In drier conditions, the bunds are larger, whereas in wetter areas, more bunds with smaller radii are built. Larger, more widely spaced half-moons are primarily used for rehabilitating grazing land or producing fodder, while smaller, closely spaced half-moons support the growth of trees and shrubs.

== Benefits and challenges ==
In addition to their primary function of capturing rainfall, the accumulated detritus attracts termites and other invertebrates, whose activity creates tunnels and pores in the organic matter. This process enhances humus formation, improves water infiltration, and ultimately enriches soil quality. When combined with other nutrient rich material such as animal manure, semi-circular bunds have been shown to significantly reduce the risk of crop failure and boost agricultural productivity—potentially tripling yields compared to more conventional methods.

However, while these techniques require minimal artificial materials and financial investment, they are highly labor-intensive: preparing one hectare of semi-circular bunds can require up to four person-months of work, with additional work for annual maintenance. Additional challenges include a lack of knowledge and the absence of training programs.

== Case studies ==
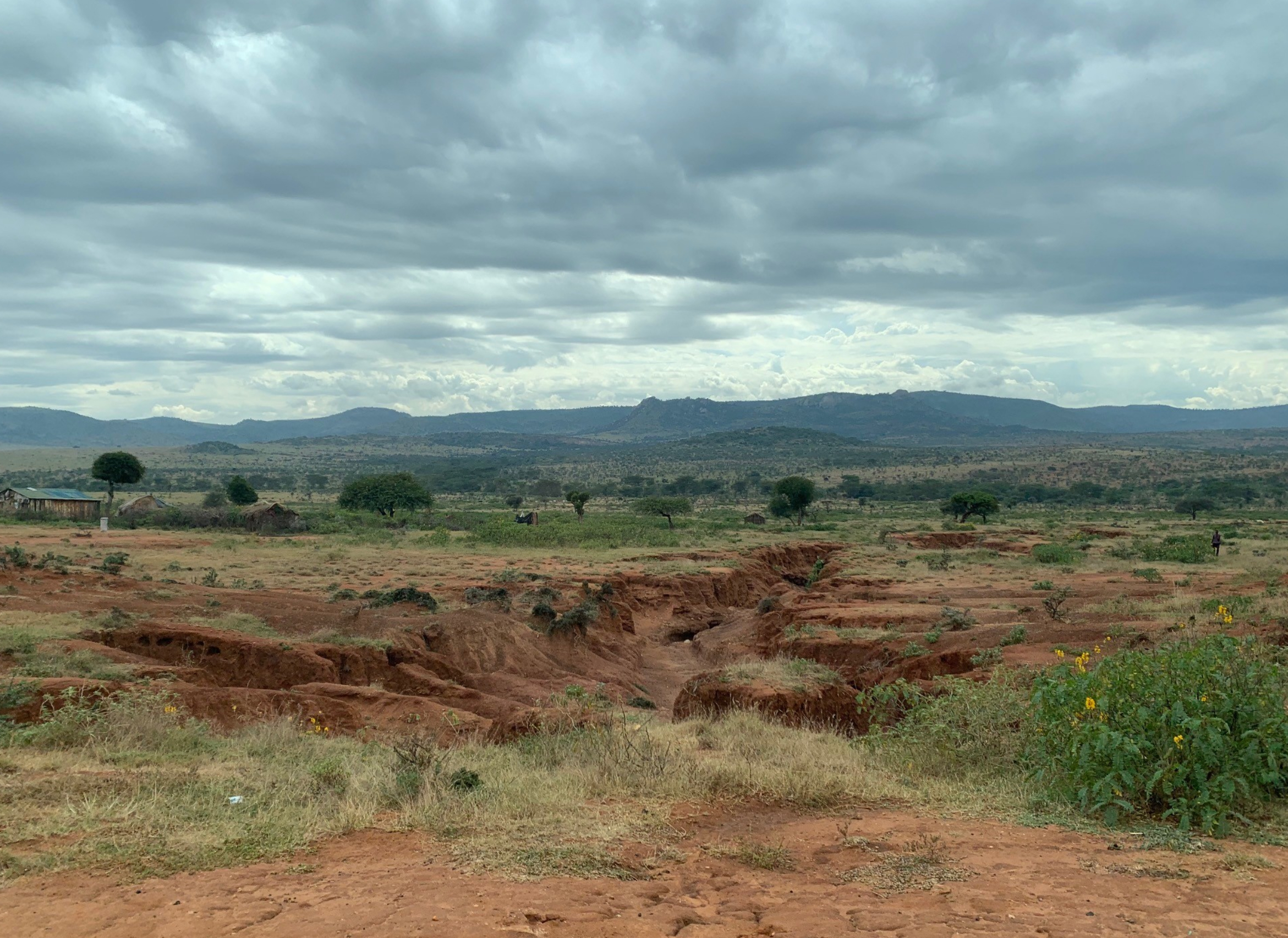
Landscape of Ewaso Ng'iro basin in Kenya

=== Ewaso Ng'iro basin in Kenya ===
In March 2023, the Wyss Academy for Nature in partnership with the Naibunga Community Conservancy and Justdiggit, started a project introducing semi-circular bunds to the Ewaso Ng'iro basin in Kenya. The first bunds were dug in March 2023, with the total amount of bunds having reached 100‘000. As of December 2023, preliminary results showed that soil had become greener, and elephants had returned to the area. Dry and wet season biodiversity and socio-ecological assessments of local livelihoods were undertaken in July and August of 2023, as well as April of 2024, and local natural resources, including habitat restoration, are continuously monitored.

=== Téra and Tahuoa in Niger ===
Semi-circular bunds in the Téra and Tahuoa regions of Niger implemented in the years from 1970 to 2010 show positive results in terms of many restoration goals. Impacts of the intervention include increased crop production (millet yields increased by 180 kg and straw yields by 400 kg per hectare per year), increased fodder production, and increased wood production. Both plant and animal diversity increased. Additionally, the demand for irrigation water decreased, and food security and self sufficiency increased. The harvesting and collection of water improved, and both soil moisture and nutrient cycling increased.

== See also ==
- Rainwater harvesting in the Sahel
- Zaï
- Contour plowing
- Great Green Wall
