= Farmer-managed natural regeneration =

Technique to combat deforestation and desertification

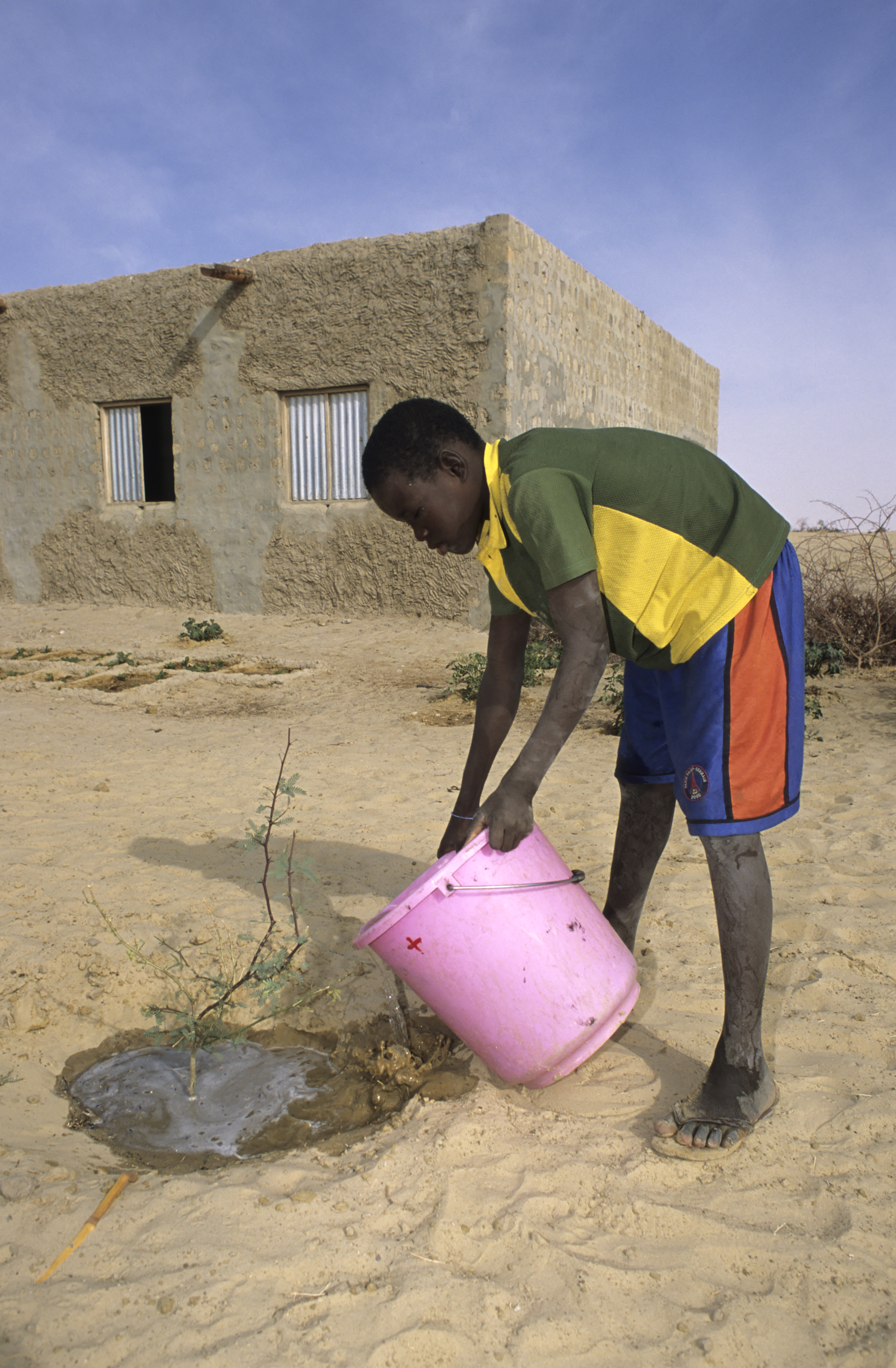
A young man waters a newly planted tree in Mali (2010).

Farmer-managed natural regeneration (FMNR) is a low-cost, sustainable land restoration technique used to combat poverty and hunger amongst poor subsistence farmers in developing countries by increasing food and timber production, and resilience to climate extremes. It involves the systematic regeneration and management of trees and shrubs from tree stumps, roots and seeds. FMNR was developed by the Australian agricultural economist Tony Rinaudo in the 1980s in West Africa. The background and development are described in Rinaudo's book The Forest Underground.

== Usage ==
FMNR is especially applicable, but not restricted to, the dryland tropics. As well as returning degraded croplands and grazing lands to productivity, it can be used to restore degraded forests, thereby reversing biodiversity loss and reducing vulnerability to climate change. FMNR can also play an important role in maintaining not-yet-degraded landscapes in a productive state, especially when combined with other sustainable land management practices such as conservation agriculture on cropland and holistic management on range lands.

FMNR adapts centuries-old methods of woodland management, called coppicing and pollarding, to produce continuous tree-growth for fuel, building materials, food and fodder without the need for frequent and costly replanting. On farmland, selected trees are trimmed and pruned to maximise growth while promoting optimal growing conditions for annual crops (such as access to water and sunlight). When FMNR trees are integrated into crops and grazing pastures there is an increase in crop yields, soil fertility and organic matter, soil moisture and leaf fodder. There is also a decrease in wind and heat damage, and soil erosion.

In the Sahel region of Africa, FMNR has become a tool in increasing food security, resilience and climate change adaptation in poor, subsistence farming communities where much of sub-Saharan Africa's poverty exists. FMNR is also being promoted in East Timor, Indonesia, and Myanmar.

FMNR complements the evergreen agriculture, conservation agriculture and agroforestry movements. It is considered a good entry point for resource-poor and risk-averse farmers to adopt a low-cost and low-risk technique. This in turn has acted as a stepping stone to greater agricultural intensification as farmers become more receptive to new ideas.

== History ==
Throughout the developing world, immense tracts of farmland, grazing lands and forests have become degraded to the point they are no longer productive. Deforestation continues at a rapid pace. In Africa's drier regions, 74 percent of rangelands and 61 percent of rain-fed croplands are damaged by moderate to very severe desertification. In some African countries deforestation rates exceed planting rates by 300:1.

Degraded land has an extremely detrimental effect on the lives of subsistence farmers who depend on it for their food and livelihoods. Subsistence farmers often make up to 70–80 percent of the population in these regions and they regularly suffer from hunger, malnutrition and even famine as a consequence.

In the Sahel region of Africa, a band of savanna which runs across the continent immediately south of the Sahara Desert, large tracts of once-productive farmland are turning to desert. In tropical regions across the world, where rich soils and good rainfall would normally assure bountiful harvests and fat livestock, some environments have become so degraded they are no longer productive.

Severe famines across the African Sahel in the 1970s and 1980s led to a global response, and stopping desertification became a top priority. Conventional methods of raising exotic and indigenous tree species in nurseries were used. Despite investing millions of dollars and thousands of hours of labour, there was little overall impact. Conventional approaches to reforestation in such harsh environments faced insurmountable problems and were costly and labour-intensive. Once planted out, drought, sand storms, pests, competition from weeds and destruction by people and animals negated efforts. Low levels of community ownership were another inhibiting factor.

Existing indigenous vegetation was generally dismissed as 'useless bush', and it was often cleared to make way for exotic species. Exotics were planted in fields containing living and sprouting stumps of indigenous vegetation, the presence of which was barely acknowledged, let alone seen as important.

This was an enormous oversight. In fact, these living tree stumps are so numerous they constitute a vast 'underground forest' just waiting for some care to grow and provide multiple benefits at little or no cost. Each stump can produce between 10 and 30 stems each. During the process of traditional land preparation, farmers saw the stems as weeds and slashed and burnt them before sowing their food crops. The net result was a barren landscape for much of the year with few mature trees remaining. To the casual observer, the land was turning to desert. Most concluded that there were no trees present and that the only way to reverse the problem was through tree planting.

Meanwhile, established indigenous trees continued to disappear at an alarming rate. In Niger, from the 1930s until 1993, forestry laws took tree ownership and responsibility for the care of trees out of the hands of the people. Reforestation through conventional tree planting seemed to be the only way to address desertification at the time.

== History ==
In the early-1980s, in the Maradi region of the Republic of Niger, the missionary organisation, Serving in Mission (SIM), was unsuccessfully attempting to reforest the surrounding districts using conventional means. In 1983, SIM began experimenting and promoting FMNR amongst about 10 farmers. During the famine of 1984, a food-for-work program was introduced that saw some 70,000 people exposed to FMNR and its practice on around 12,500 hectares of farmland. From 1985 to 1999, FMNR continued to be promoted locally and nationally as exchange visits and training days were organised for various NGOs, government foresters, Peace Corps volunteers, and farmer and civil society groups. Additionally, SIM project staff and farmers visited numerous locations across Niger to provide training.

By 2004 it was ascertained that FMNR was being practised on over five million hectares or 50 percent of Niger's farmland – an average reforestation rate of 250,000 hectares per year over a 20-year period. This transformation prompted a Senior Fellow of the World Resources Institute, Chris Reij, to comment that "this is probably the largest positive environmental transformation in the Sahel and perhaps all of Africa".

In 2004, World Vision Australia and World Vision Ethiopia initiated a forestry-based carbon sequestration project as a potential means to stimulate community development while engaging in environmental restoration. A partnership with the World Bank, the Humbo Community-based Natural Regeneration Project involved the regeneration of 2,728 hectares of degraded native forests. This brought social, economic and ecological benefits to the participating communities. Within two years, communities were collecting wild fruits, firewood, and fodder, and reported that wildlife had begun to return and erosion and flooding had been reduced. In addition, the communities are now receiving payments for the sale of carbon credits through the Clean Development Mechanism (CDM) of the Kyoto Protocol.

Following the success of the Humbo project, FMNR spread to the Tigray region of northern Ethiopia where 20,000 hectares have been set aside for regeneration, including 10 hectare FMNR model sites for research and demonstration in each of 34 sub-districts. The Government of Ethiopia has committed to reforest 15 million hectares of degraded land using FMNR as part of a climate change and renewable energy plan to become carbon neutral by 2025.

In Talensi, northern Ghana, FMNR is being practiced on 2,000–3,000 hectares and new projects are introducing FMNR into three new districts. In the Kaffrine and Diourbel regions of Senegal, FMNR has spread across 50,000 hectares in four years. World Vision is also promoting FMNR in Indonesia, Myanmar and East Timor. There are also examples of both independently promoted and spontaneous FMNR movements occurring. In Burkina Faso, for example, an increasing part of the country is being transformed into agro-forestry parkland. And in Mali, an ageing agro-forestry parkland of about six million hectares is showing signs of regeneration.

== Key principles ==
FMNR depends on the existence of living tree stumps or roots in crop fields, grazing pastures, woodlands or forests. Each season bushy growth will sprout from the stumps/roots often appearing like small shrubs. Continuous grazing by livestock, regular burning and/or regular harvesting for fuel wood results in these 'shrubs' never attaining tree stature. On farmland, standard practice has been for farmers to slash this regrowth in preparation for planting crops, but with a little attention this growth can be turned into a valuable resource without jeopardising crop yields.

For each stump, a decision is made as to how many stems will be chosen to grow. The tallest and straightest stems are selected and the remaining stems culled. Best results are obtained when the farmer returns regularly to prune any unwanted new stems and side branches as they appear. Farmers can then grow other crops between and around the trees. When farmers want wood they can cut the stem(s) they want and leave the rest to continue growing. The remaining stems will increase in size and value each year, and will continue to protect the environment. Each time a stem is harvested, a younger stem is selected to replace it.

Various naturally occurring tree species can be used which may also provide berries, fruits and nuts or have medicinal qualities. In Niger, commonly used species include: Strychnos spinosa, Balanites aegyptiaca, Boscia senegalensis, Ziziphus spp., Annona senegalensis, Poupartia birrea and Faidherbia albida. However, the most important determinants are whatever species are locally available, their ability to re-sprout after cutting, and the value local people place on those species.

Faidherbia albida, also known as the 'fertiliser tree', is popular for intercropping across the Sahel as it fixes nitrogen into the soil, provides fodder for livestock, and shade for crops and livestock. By shedding its leaves in the wet season, Faidherbia provides beneficial light shade to crops when high temperatures would otherwise damage crops or retard growth. Leaf fall contributes useful nutrients and organic matter to the soil.

The practice of FMNR is not confined to croplands. It is being practised on grazing land and in degraded communal forests as well. When there are no living stumps, seeds of naturally occurring species are used. In reality, there is no fixed way of practising FMNR and farmers are free to choose which species they will leave, the density of trees they prefer, and the timing and method of pruning.

== In practice ==
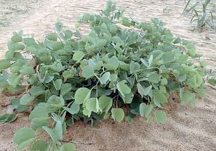

FMNR depends on the existence of living tree stumps, tree roots and seeds to be re-vegetated. These can be in crop fields, grazing lands or degraded forests. New stems, which sprout from these stumps and tree roots, can be selected and pruned for improved growth. Sprouting tree stumps and roots may look like shrubs and are often ignored or even slashed by farmers or foresters. However, with culling of excess stems and by selecting and pruning of the best stems, the re-growth has enormous potential to rapidly grow into trees.

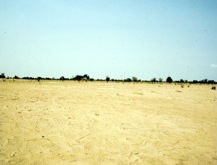

Seemingly treeless fields may contain seeds and living tree stumps and roots which have the ability to sprout new stems and regenerate trees. Even this 'bare' millet field in West Africa contains hundreds of living stumps per hectare which are buried beneath the surface like an underground forest.

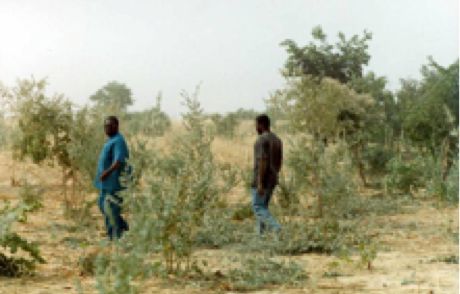

Step 1. Do not automatically slash all tree growth, but survey your farm noting how many and what species of trees are present.

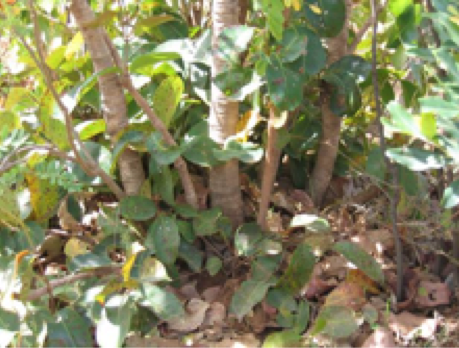

Step 2. Select the stumps which will be used for regeneration.

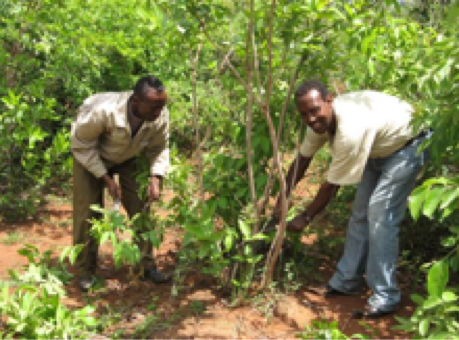

Step 3. Select the best five or so stems and cull unwanted ones. This way, when you want wood you can cut the stem(s) that are needed and leave the rest to continue growing. These remaining stems will increase in size and value each year, and will continue to protect the environment and provide other useful materials and services such as fodder, humus, habitat for useful pest predators and protection from the wind and sun. Each time one stem is harvested, a younger stem is selected to replace it.

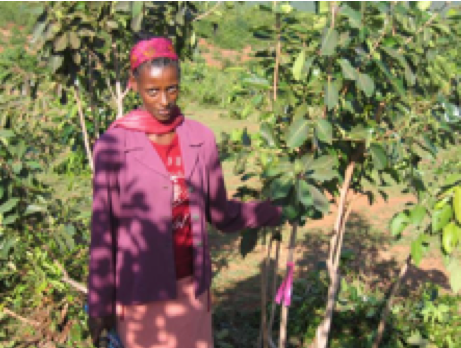

Tag selected stems with a coloured rag or paint. Work with the whole community to draw up and agree on laws which will protect the trees being pruned and respect each person's rights. Where possible, include government forestry staff and local authorities in planning and decision making.

== Benefits ==
FMNR can restore degraded farmlands, pastures and forests by increasing the quantity and value of woody vegetation, by increasing biodiversity and by improving soil structure and fertility through leaf litter and nutrient cycling. The reforestation also retards wind and water erosion; it creates windbreaks which decrease soil moisture evaporation, and protects crops and livestock against searing winds and temperatures. Often, dried up springs reappear and the water table rises towards historic levels; insect eating predators including insects, spiders and birds return, helping to keep crop pests in check; the trees can be a source of edible berries and nuts; and over time the biodiversity of plant and animal life is increased. FMNR can be used to combat deforestation and desertification and can also be an important tool in maintaining the integrity and productivity of land that is not yet degraded.

Trials, long-running programs and anecdotal data indicate that FMNR can at least double crop yields on low fertility soils. In the Sahel, high numbers of livestock and an eight month dry season can mean that pastures are completely depleted before the rains commence. However, with the presence of trees, grazing animals can make it through the dry season by feeding on tree leaves and seed pods of some species, at a time when no other fodder is available. In northeast Ghana, more grass became available with the introduction of FMNR because communities worked together to prevent bush fires from destroying their trees.

Well designed and executed FMNR projects can act as catalysts to empower communities as they negotiate land ownership or user rights for the trees in their care. This assists with self-organisation, and with the development of new agriculture-based micro-enterprises (e.g., selling firewood, timber and handcrafts made from timber or woven grasses).

Conventional approaches to reversing desertification, such as funding tree planting, rarely spread beyond the project boundary once external funding is withdrawn. By comparison, FMNR is cheap, rapid, locally led and implemented. It uses local skills and resources – the poorest farmers can learn by observation and teach their neighbours. Given an enabling environment, or at least the absence of a 'disabling' environment, FMNR can be done at scale and spread well beyond the original target area without ongoing government or NGO intervention.

World Vision evaluations of FMNR conducted in Senegal and Ghana in 2011 and 2012 found that households practising FMNR were less vulnerable to extreme weather shocks such as drought and damaging rain and wind storms.

The following table summarises FMNR's benefits which fit the sustainable development model of economic, social and environmental benefits:

Economic benefits	Social benefits	Environmental benefits
Increased crop yields (often double or triple)	Increased food security and nutrition (including native fruits, nuts and seeds)	Reduced erosion
Increased fodder from edible leaves and seed pods, and in some cases increased pasture growth	Less distance for women and children to travel to collect firewood	Reduced soil-moisture evaporation due to wind breaks shading and mulching
Higher livestock productivity and survival	Community capacity building to deal with local, regional and national governments and regulators	Increased soil fertility
Reduced impact from floods and drought – trees provide alternative income and livelihood sources making impacts less severe and recovery faster	Improved governance through clarification of tree ownership laws and regulations	Improved soil structure through greater quantities of organic matter
Increased income generation through diversification (e.g. timber and fuel wood) and intensification of activities	Education and training in farming and marketing	Increased water infiltration and groundwater recharge
Economic flow-on effects such as employment and greater purchasing capacity	Reduced need for migration by young people and men to cities	Increased biodiversity, environmental restoration and tree cover
Increased economic activity creates opportunities, e.g., development of new business models such as cooperatives	Higher incomes result in better opportunities for medical treatment, children's education, nutrition and clothing, etc.	Enhanced resilience to climate change
	Empowerment for community members to live independently with hope for the future	

== Key success factors and constraints ==
While there are numerous accounts of the uptake and spread of FMNR independent of aid and development agencies, the following factors have been found to be beneficial for its introduction and spread:

- Awareness creation of FMNR's potential.
- Capacity building through workshops and exchange visits.
- Awareness of the devastating effects of deforestation. The adoption of FMNR is more likely when communities acknowledge their situation and the need to take action. This perception of need can be supported by education.
- An FMNR champion/facilitator from within the community who encourages, challenges and trains peers. This is critical during the first three to five years, and continues to be important for up to 10 years. Regular site visits also ensure early detection and remedial action on resistance and threats to FMNR through deliberate damage to trees and theft.
- The buy-in of all stakeholders including their agreement on any by-laws created for FMNR and the consequences for infringements. Stakeholders include FMNR practitioners, local, regional and national government departments of agriculture and forestry, men, women, youth, marginalised groups (including nomadic herders), cultivators and commercial interests.
- Stakeholder buy-in is also important to create a critical mass of FMNR adopters in order to change social attitudes from a position of apathy or active participation in deforestation to one of proactive sustainable tree management through FMNR.
- Government support through the creation of favourable policies, positive reinforcement of actions facilitating the spread of FMNR, and disincentives for actions working against the spread of FMNR. FMNR practitioners need to be confident that they will benefit from their labours (either private or community ownership of trees, or legally binding user rights).
- Reinforcement of existing organisational structures (farmers clubs, development groups, traditional leadership structures) or establishment of new structures which will provide a framework for communities to practise FMNR on a local, district or region-wide basis.
- A communications strategy which includes education in schools, radio programs and engagement with religious and traditional leaders to become advocates.
- Establishment of a legal, transparent and accessible market for FMNR wood and non-timber forest products, enabling practitioners to benefit financially from their activities.

Brown et al. suggest that the two main reasons why FMNR has spread so widely in Niger are attitudinal change by the community of what constitutes good land management practices, and farmers' ownership of trees. Farmers need the assurance that they will benefit from their labour. Giving farmers either outright ownership of the trees they protect, or tree-user rights, has made it possible for large-scale farmer-led reforestation to take place.

== Current and future directions ==
Over nearly 30 years, FMNR has changed the farming landscape in some of the poorest countries in the world, including parts of Niger, Burkina Faso, Mali, and Senegal, providing subsistence farmers with the methods necessary to become more food secure and resilient against severe weather events.

The 2011–2012 food crisis in East Africa gave a stark reminder of the importance of addressing root causes of hunger. In the 2011 State of the World Report, Bunch concludes that four major factors – lack of sustainable fertile land, loss of traditional fallowing, cost of fertiliser and climate change – are coming together all at once in a sort of "perfect storm" that will almost surely result in an African famine of unprecedented proportions, probably within the next four to five years. It will most heavily affect the lowland, semi-arid to sub-humid areas of Africa (including the Sahel, parts of eastern Africa, plus a band from Malawi across to Angola and Namibia); and unless the world does something dramatic, 10 to 30 million people could die from famine between 2015 and 2020. Restoration of degraded land through FMNR is one way of addressing these major contributors to hunger.

In recent years FMNR has come to the attention of global development agencies and grassroots movements alike. The World Bank, World Resources Institute, World Agroforestry Center, USAID and the Permaculture movement are amongst those either actively promoting or advocating for the uptake of FMNR and FMNR has received recognition from a number of quarters including:

- In 2010, FMNR won the Interaction 4 Best Practice and Innovation Initiative award in recognition of high technical standards and effectiveness in addressing the food security and livelihood needs of small producers in the areas of natural resource management and agro forestry.
- In 2011, FMNR won the World Vision International Global Resilience Award for the most innovative initiative in the area of resilient development practice and natural environment and climate issues.
- In 2012 WVA was awarded the Arbor Day Award for Education Innovation.

In April 2012, World Vision Australia – in partnership with the World Agroforestry Center and World Vision East Africa – held an international conference in Nairobi called "Beating Famine" to analyse and plan how to improve food security for the world's poor through the use of FMNR and Evergreen Agriculture. The conference was attended by more than 200 participants, including world leaders in sustainable agriculture, five East African ministers of agriculture and the environment, ambassadors, and other government representatives from Africa, Europe, and Australia, and leaders from non-government and international organisations.

Two major outcomes of the conference were:

1. The establishment of a global FMNR network of key stakeholders to promote, encourage and initiate the scale-up of FMNR globally.
2. Country, regional and global level plans as a basis for inter-organisation collaboration for FMNR scale-up.

The conference acted as a catalyst for media coverage of FMNR in some of the world's leading outlets and a noticeable increase in momentum for an FMNR global movement. This heightened awareness of FMNR has created an opportunity for it to spread exponentially worldwide.

== See also ==
- Agroecological restoration
- Agroecology
- Agroforestry
- Forest gardening
- Landscape of agriculture
- Regenerative agriculture
- Sustainable forest management
- Zaï
