= Drylands =

Water-scarce areas

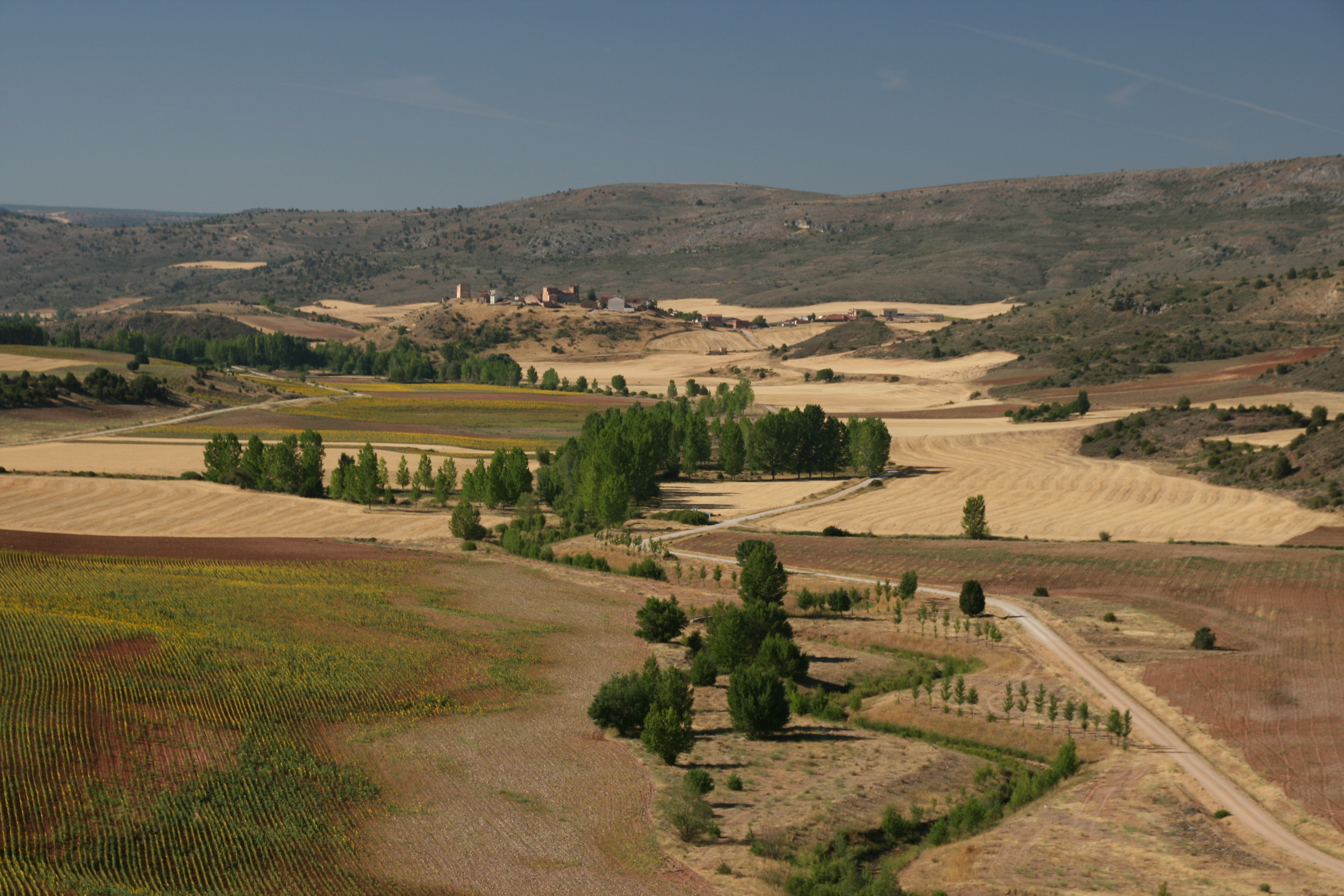
Dryland farms and the Linares River in the Castilla–La Mancha region of Spain

Drylands are defined by a scarcity of water. Drylands are zones where precipitation is balanced by evaporation from surfaces and by evapotranspiration by plants. The United Nations Environment Program defines drylands as tropical and temperate areas with an aridity index of less than 0.65. Drylands can be classified into four sub-types:

- Dry sub-humid lands
- Semi-arid lands
- Arid lands
- Hyper-arid lands

Some authorities regard hyper-arid lands as deserts (United Nations Convention to Combat Desertification) although a number of the world's deserts include both hyper-arid and arid climate zones. The UNCCD excludes hyper-arid zones from its definition of drylands.

Drylands cover 41.3% of the Earth's land surface, including 15% of Latin America, 66% of Africa, 40% of Asia, and 24% of Europe. There is a significantly greater proportion of drylands in developing countries (72%), and the proportion increases with aridity: almost 100% of all hyper-arid lands are in the developing world. Nevertheless, the United States, Australia, and several countries in Southern Europe also contain significant dryland areas. Drylands are home to more than 2 billion people.

Drylands are complex ecosystems, whose characteristics and dynamic properties depend on many interrelated interactions between climate, soil, and vegetation. Drylands are highly vulnerable to climate change due to changing rainfall patterns and land degradation.

== Importance ==
The livelihoods of millions of people in developing countries depend highly on dryland ecosystems to ensure their food security and their well-being. Drylands, unlike more humid biomes, rely mostly on above ground water runoff for redistribution of water. Dryland inhabitants' lifestyles provide global environmental benefits such as contributing to halting climate change through carbon sequestration and species conservation. Dryland biodiversity is equally important to sustainable development. Drylands also provide significant global economic value through the provision of ecosystem services and biodiversity conservation. The UN Conference on Sustainable Development, Rio+20 held in Brazil in June 2012, stressed the intrinsic value of drylands' biodiversity and recognized the severity of biodiversity loss and degradation in these ecosystems.

== Climate change ==
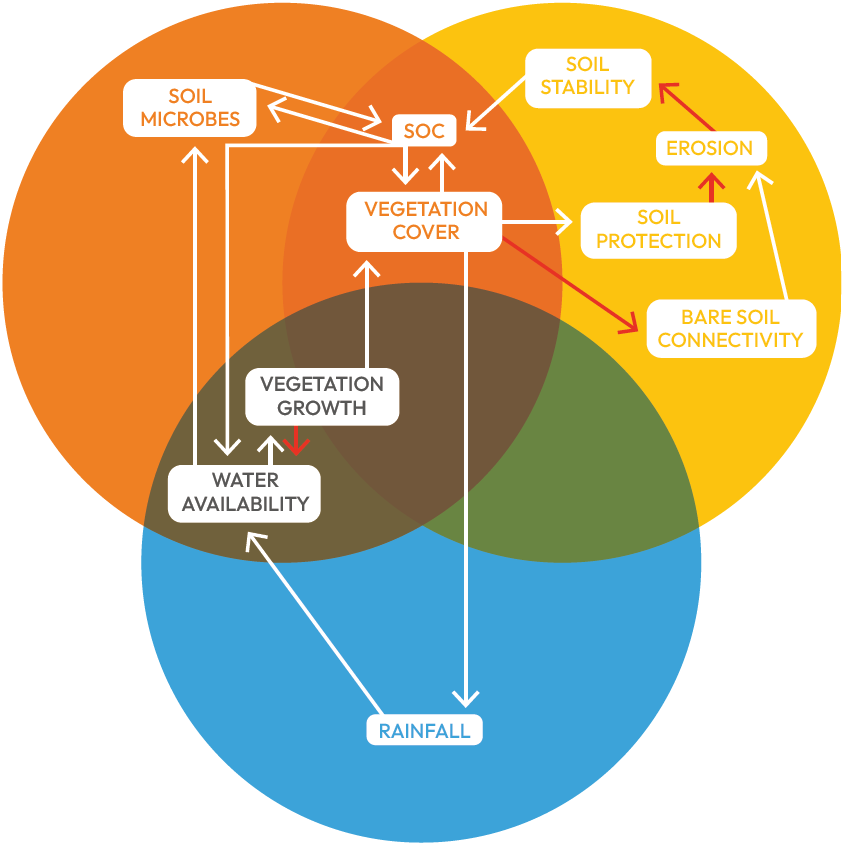
Key feedbacks that could lead to dryland ecosystems crossing tipping points. SOC stands for soil organic carbon. White arrows represent positive effects and red arrows are negative effects.

Climate change and human activities are causing land degradation in drylands. These factors have led to increasing droughts, desertification and soil erosion, which decreases biodiversity, soil fertility and carbon sequestration in these regions. This has negative impacts on local agriculture and food security. Drylands ecosystems also feature climate tipping points.

From 1982 to 2015, 12.6% of the world's drylands have degraded due to anthropogenic climate change. Drylands' vulnerability to land degradation and desertification is affecting 213 million people of which the vast majority live in the Global South. In recent decades, about 7.6% of global land (an area larger than Canada) has transitioned into drier conditions, either becoming more arid or shifting from non-drylands to drylands. An area half the size of Australia has transformed from once-humid landscapes into drylands.

A 2024 assessment by the United Nations Convention to Combat Desertification (UNCCD) found that drylands expanded from 37.5% of the world's land area in 1961–1990 to 40.6% in 1991–2020, excluding Antarctica. The increase represented approximately 4.3 million square kilometres of additional dryland. The assessment included hyper-arid, arid, semi-arid and dry sub-humid regions and found that 77.6% of global land experienced a shift toward drier climatic conditions between the two periods. Long-term increases in aridity are distinct from temporary droughts and do not necessarily indicate that all affected land has undergone ecological degradation.

Sustainable land management practices (such as mobile pastoralism), restoring degraded lands, and climate-smart agriculture can mitigate these impacts. Addressing urban expansion's indirect impacts, such as water use, on dryland habitats is also important for preserving biodiversity.

=== Drylands in East Africa ===
The East African drylands cover of the land areas and are home to more than 60 million people. Pastoralists who rely on cattle for both economic and cultural well-being constitute the majority of rural inhabitants in the drylands. Pastoralists use strategic movement to gain access to pasture during the dry season, using the available resources effectively. However, this is facing challenges due to demographics and climate change. The greatest issue in drylands, is land degradation which poses a huge danger to food security. Drylands occupy around 2 million km^{2} and 90% of Kenya, 75% of Tanzania, and 67% of Ethiopia. The low level of precipitation and the high degree of variability in the climatic conditions limit the possibilities for rainfed crop production in these areas.

== Four sub-types ==
=== Dry and sub-humid lands ===
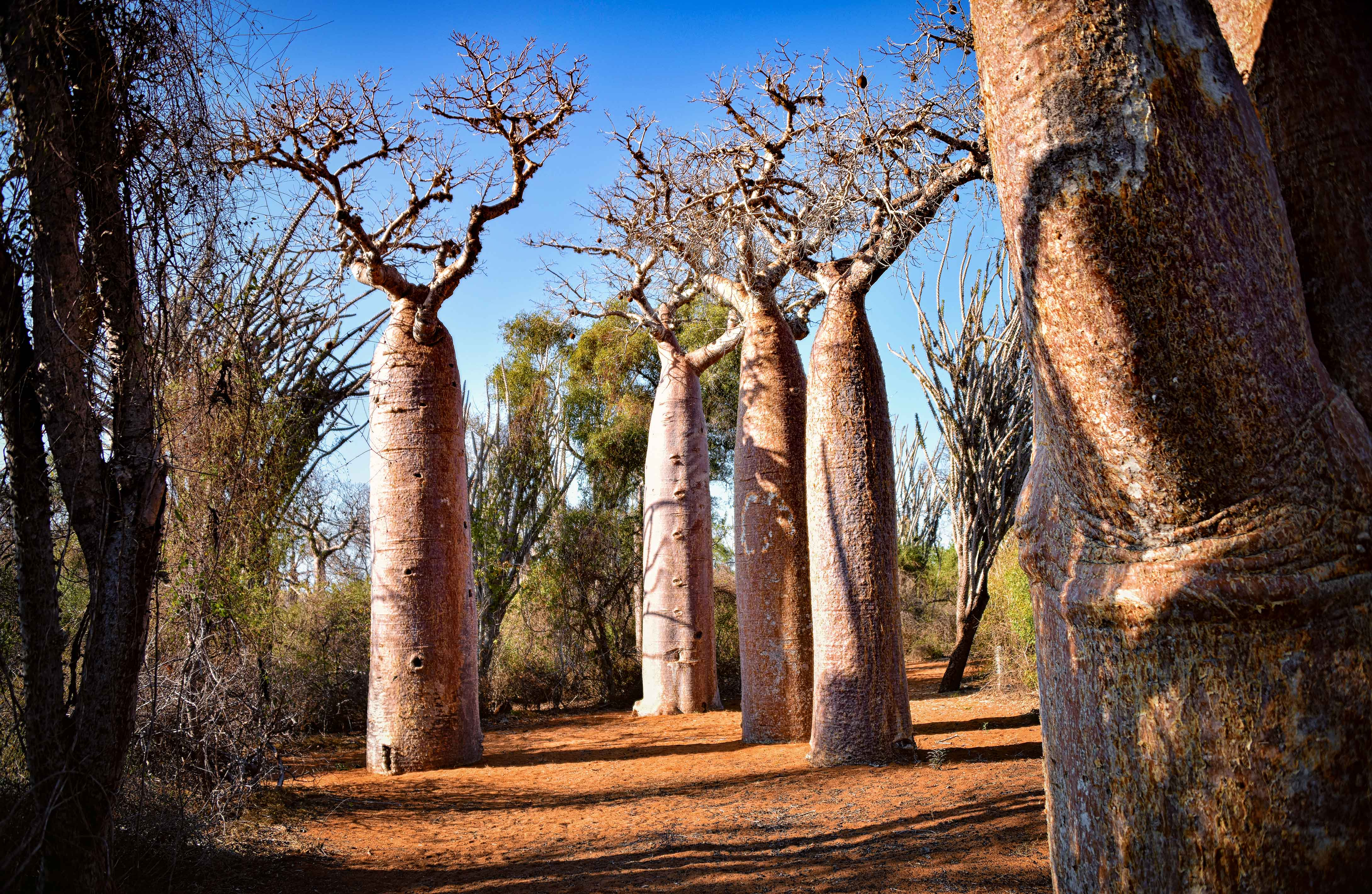
Spiny forest, Madagascar

Countries like Burkina Faso, Botswana, Iraq, Kazakhstan, Turkmenistan and the Republic of Moldova, are 99% covered in areas of dry and sub-humid lands. The biodiversity of dry and sub-humid lands allows them to adapt to the unpredictable rainfall patterns that lead to both floods and droughts. These areas produce a large amount the world's crops and livestock. Even further than producing the vast majority of crops in the world, it is also significant because it includes many different biomes such as the following:

- Grassland
- Savannahs
- Mediterranean climate

=== Semi-arid lands ===
Semi-arid lands can be found in several regions of the world. For instance in places such as Europe, Mexico, Southwestern parts of the U.S., Countries in Africa that are just above the equator, and several Southern countries in Asia.

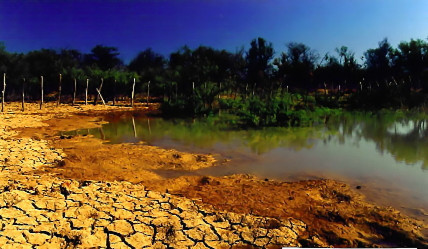
Brazilian semi-arid region

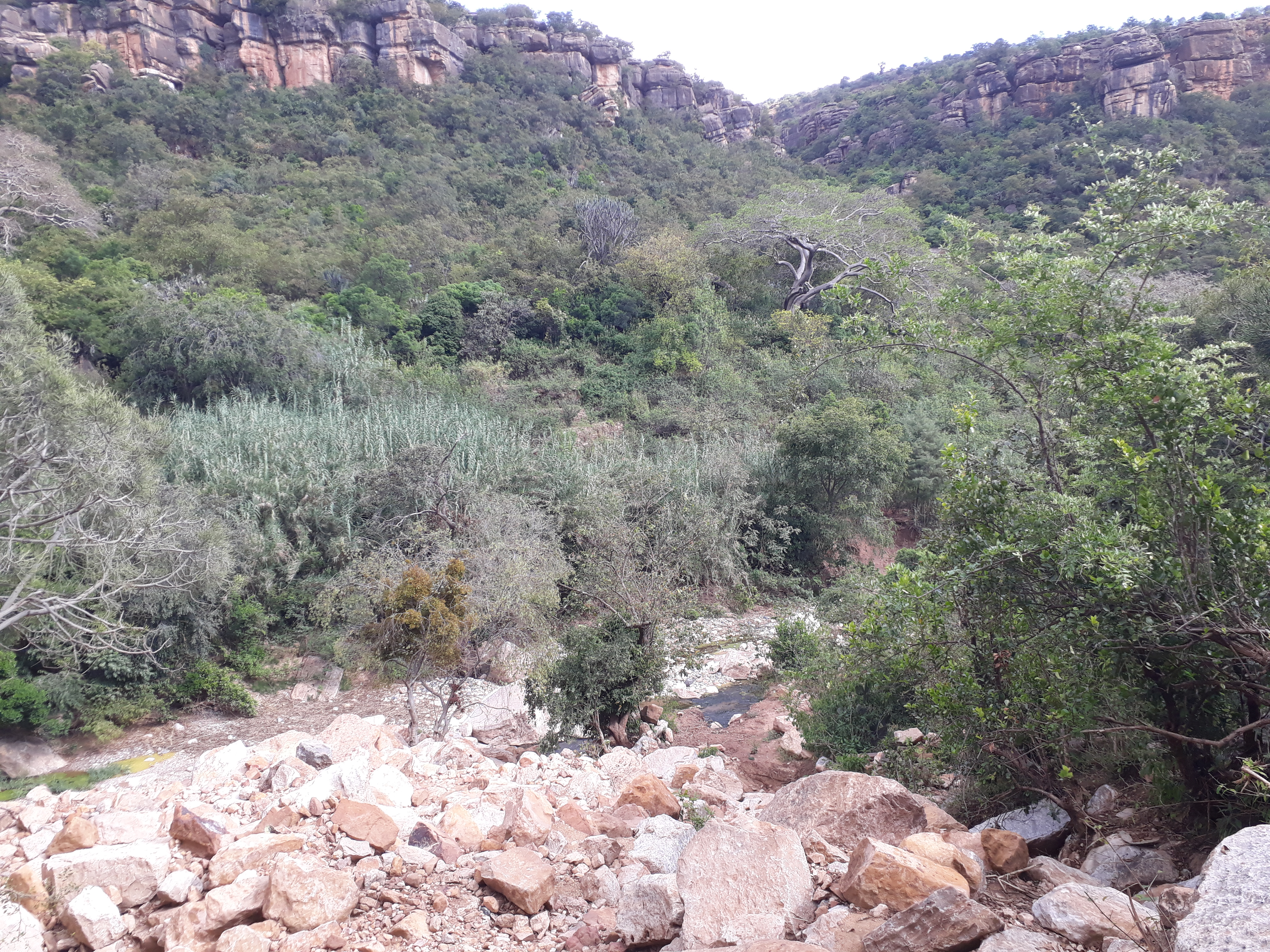
Gestet forest in north Ethiopia

Definition of semi-arid lands

Arid and semi-arid lands are defined based on the characteristics of the climate. One measure based on precipitation considers semi-arid lands as places where the annual rainfall ranges between 500 and 800mm. Other sources insist that the concept of aridity should be included in the definition.

==== Manifestations of climate change in semi-arid lands ====
Based on the consequences caused by the variability of climate change, dryland populations appear to be more vulnerable than others. As much of the rainfall occurs in variable extreme events that are hard to predict. The manifestation of climate change on the development of socioeconomic activities in semi-arid lands are:

- Increased variability of precipitations and their characteristics (number of rainfall days, start of rainy season, length of the season) that can be translated to an abrupt alternative between dry and humid years
- a shorter rainy season correlated to its late start
- an increase in the occurrence of dry sequences that occur randomly and are hard to forecast
- a tendency of maximal rains concentrated in fewer consecutive days, thus causing damage
- dry and violent winds associated with very scarce rainfall that prevent the building of soil moisture
- increased temperatures causing thermal stress that may seriously handicap human, animal, and plant life

==== Adaptation and resilience ====
In semi-arid lands where pastoralism is the principal activity, the main adaptation measures are an earlier movement of herds, the reduction of the size of the herd, a change in the management of water, and diversification of paths of transhumance. This allows breeders to safeguard their livestock and prevent huge losses as was the case in the drought of the seventies. Other adaptations include becoming proactive (engage in trade, real estate, guarding, transport) this is taking place in certain countries like Burkina Faso, Senegal, Mali, and Kenya. These adaptation strategies allow them to be more resilient to climate change.

=== Arid lands ===
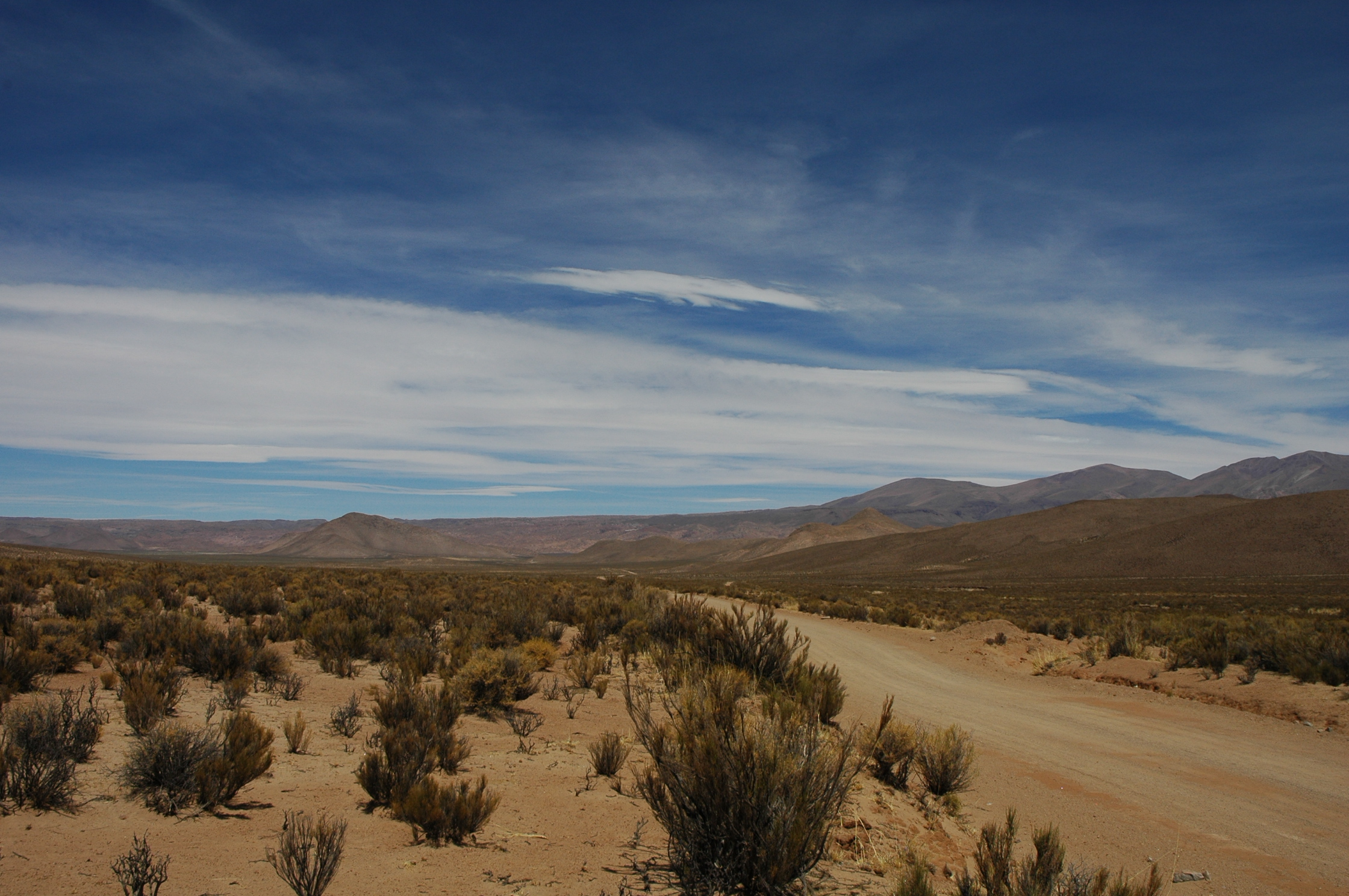
Arid chaco

Arid lands make up about 10% of the world's land and are home to 20% of the world's people. The UNCCD defined them as having an aridity index between ~0.05-0.20.

=== Hyper-arid lands ===
These lands cover ~8% of the world and consist of areas of little to no vegetation. They receive irregular rainfall that barely surpasses 100 mm, and in some cases, they may not receive rainfall for several years.

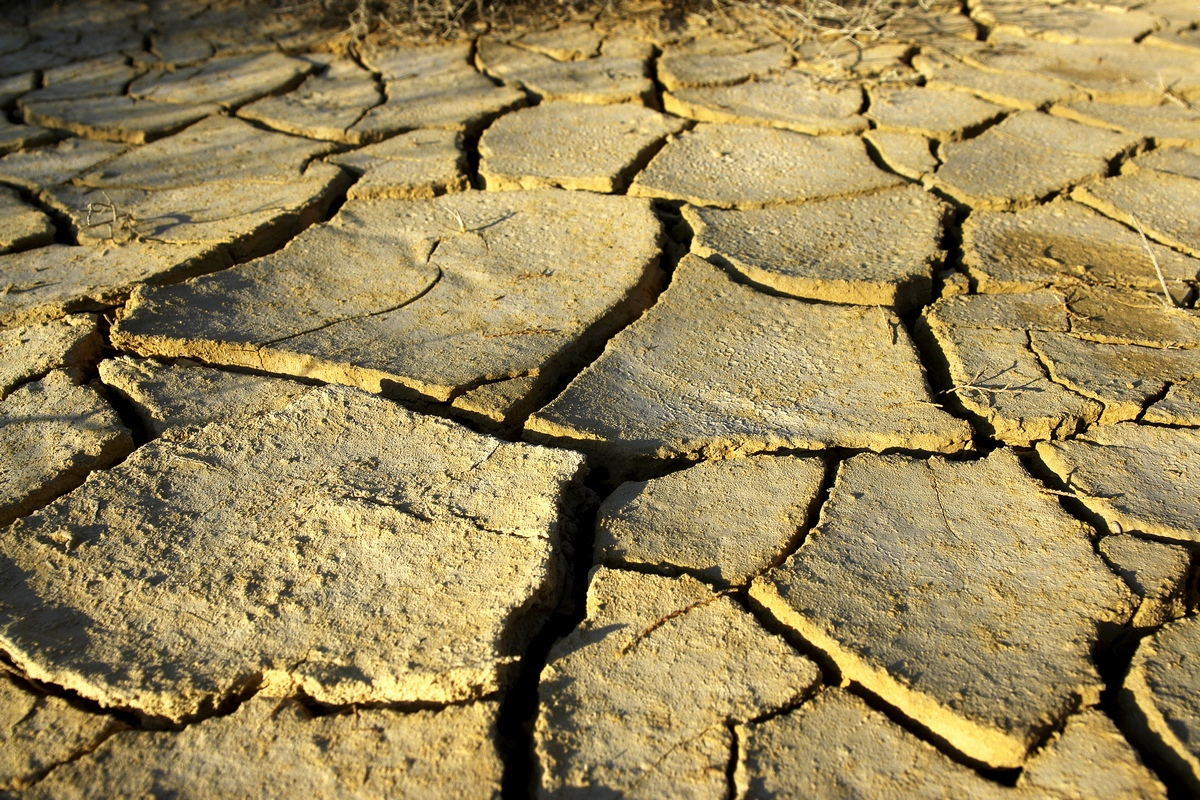
Dry land

== Dryland restoration ==
Restoration is defined by IPBES as 'any intentional activities that initiates or accelerates the recovery of an ecosystem from a degraded state.' It is one of the three pillars of nature-based solutions defined by the IUCN as "actions to protect, sustainably manage, and restore natural or modified ecosystems, that address societal challenges effectively and adaptively, simultaneously providing human well-being and biodiversity benefits". Ecosystem restoration in general is also emphasized as a tool for climate mitigation and adaptation by IUCN and IPCC.

Dryland restoration is often understood in two ways; either to restore a dryland to its previous functionality or to avoid further degradation. The first perspective is based on the restoration of the degraded dryland areas themselves. Restoration of a degraded dryland to its previous functionality and ecosystem state can have benefits for both humans and nature when done correctly. The second emphasises preventative and adaptive land management to support ecosystem services and functionalities. This is the presumed logic behind the extensive project in the Sahel region named the Great Green Wall supported by UNCCD (see: case studies).

FAO provides 10 practice principles to guide ecosystem restoration. The principles include the selection and management of restoration activities at project sites, prevention of misuse of resources and unintended consequences, enabling conditions for restoration, and assessing and applying lessons learned.

=== Desertification distribution ===
UNCCD works actively against desertification and land degradation to sustain humans and biodiversity under a changing climate. Their aim is to foster solutions with synergies between climate mitigation and adaptation, biodiversity, and human well-being targets. Desertification is a major problem threatening ecosystems and human lives with the most affected regions being Western Asia and South America. However, some researchers raise criticism against the dominant desertification narrative. The Sahel region is often falsely perceived as drying at a higher rate than other places. Critics argue that desertification in the Sahel region originates from a colonial understanding of the land use/land cover. In reality, the region has experienced a greening during the last decades.

=== Sustainable rangeland management ===
Rangelands cover about 25% of drylands globally. With its carbon sequestration potential, rangeland restoration is considered a climate mitigation option. Rangeland restoration can also improve livelihood opportunities for local pastoralists and can help combat desertification.

Ecological, economic, political, institutional and socio-cultural factors can support or limit the adaptation of restoration practices. Global dynamics and external shocks such as drought, pests, diseases, and conflict have an effect at the local level. The adoption of a sustainable rangeland practice is highly context specific and cannot be generalized. For example, the same law on rangeland use could support the implementation of a specific restoration practice, but the same law might hinder another restoration practice.

=== Restoration techniques ===
Restoration efforts in dryland areas are particularly challenging because of rare and variable precipitation, high temperatures, low soil fertility, and invasive species. A defining feature of dryland ecosystems is the patchiness of its vegetation, where isolated vegetated patches are scattered within largely bare areas. Restoration techniques addressing this patchiness are restoration islands (also known as assisted nucleation or nucleation plantings), the use of soil fauna, as well as techniques such as afforestation, exclosures, and silvopastoralism. Smaller scale techniques such as semicircular bunds have also shown promising results.

==== Restoration islands ====
Restoration islands use small, strategically located plantings (islands) to make use of limited resources. Once established, the island plantations proliferate (nucleate) into neighboring areas. This strategy is best suited to address the patchiness of dryland vegetation, because restoration islands can be placed in the most promising locations and are less resource-intensive than large-scale plantations. Other benefits include reduced fire risk, lower soil erosion, weed control, seed sources for long-term restoration, and habitat for wildlife. However, the harsh conditions in dryland ecosystems limit the use of restoration islands. Compared to humid ecosystems, vegetation patches in drylands take more time to nucleate as extensively.

==== Use of soil fauna ====
Soil fauna improve the physical, chemical, and biological properties of the soil. They contribute to seed dispersal, pest control, nutrient cycling, water infiltration, and soil structure, thus increasing vegetation productivity. However, aridity and high temperatures in drylands put soil fauna under pressure. Supporting measures include using endemic species, restoration islands as nucleation sites, and mulching to increase soil moisture.

=== Indigenous knowledge and community engagement ===
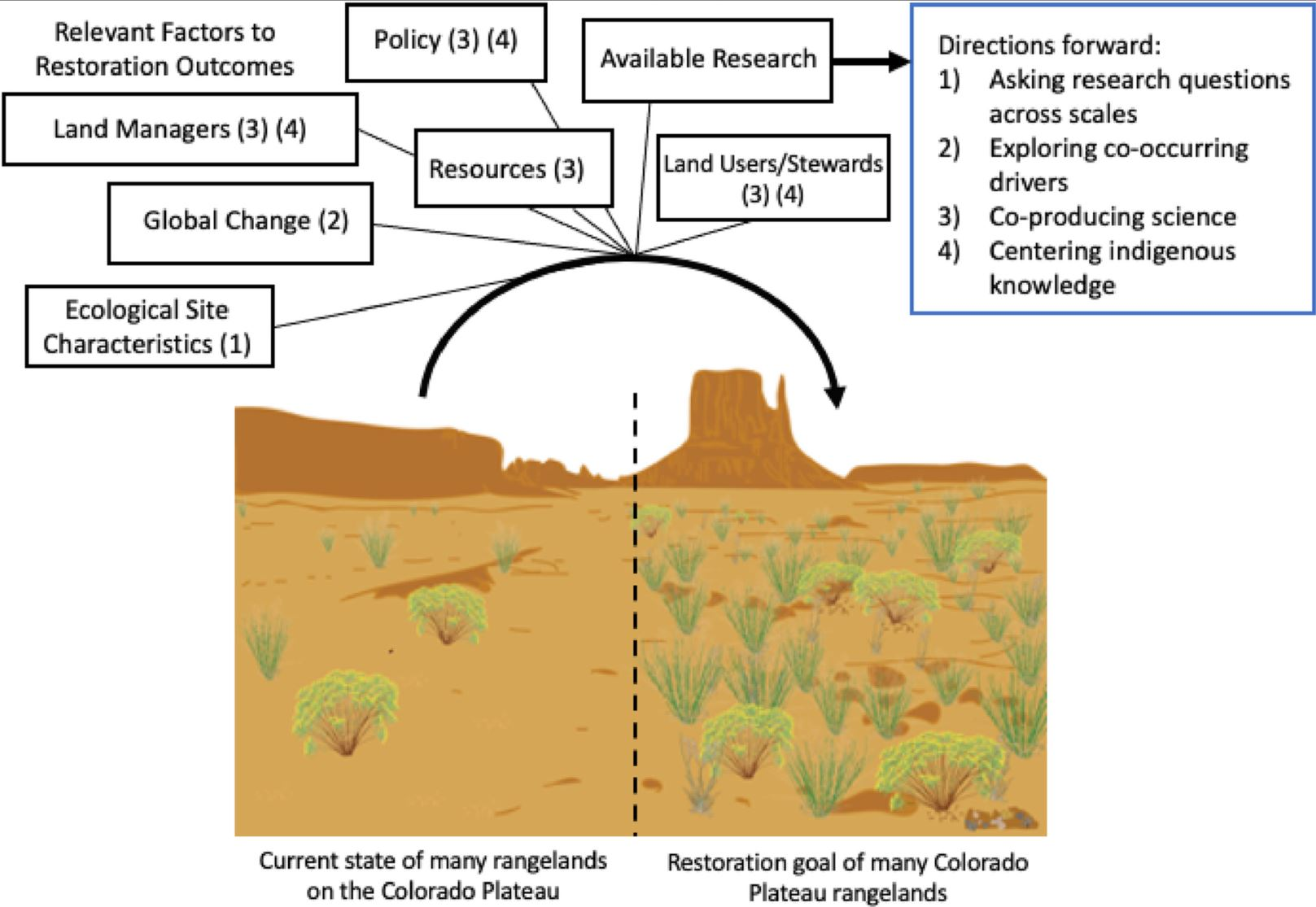
Inputs for successful dryland restoration research and including local knowledge

Indigenous or local knowledge plays an important role in protecting and restoring drylands. Several case studies have found that the inclusion of indigenous knowledge and local communities has increased restoration success. Local knowledge tends to be hyper localized and is important for adaptation to climate change, this is especially relevant for dryland areas as the ecosystems themselves tend to have high heterogeneity. Approaches such as silvopastoralism/agroforestry have been applied for centuries in dryland communities with great success. These practices can also have positive outcomes for community members not engaged in pastoralism as the forest can provide important resources for building constructions and woodfuel for homes. One technique that studies have shown to be successful is the use of indigenous fire ecology to lower the fuel load in ecosystems and help prevent the large devastating fires. This is especially relevant now as in North and South America over 25% of the population lives in drylands. Places like California have already seen increased ecological and societal impacts from fires in recent decades. Community engagement has also been shown to be a crucial part of successful restoration plans and efforts towards decolonization, as centering the local community in land decisions can help repair their right to self-determination thus improving restoration outcomes. This is especially relevant for drylands as many of worlds dryland areas are located in historically colonized regions.

=== Case Studies ===
==== Regenerative Agriculture in Woodend, Victoria ====
In the Woodend region of Central Victoria, integrated farm management practices have been implemented to mitigate land degradation in an area vulnerable to desertification. These systems integrate diverse livestock, vegetable, and fruit production, guided by the principles of regenerative agriculture and keyline design. To optimize water efficiency, keyline irrigation is synchronized with poultry grazing to leverage natural fertilization. By applying water during low-evaporation periods, these practices promote greater root depth and biomass production, which are instrumental in enhancing soil carbon sequestration and strengthening the landscape's climate resilience.

==== The Great Green Wall ====
The Great Green Wall is an African Union initiative to restore 100 million hectares of degraded land in the Sahel region through afforestation, especially across areas involved with pastoralism. Initially, it aimed to plant a continuous band of trees from Senegal to Djibouti, but has since evolved into a broader restoration effort. It aims to establish climate resilience and carbon sequestration as well as supporting local livelihoods through improved food security, economic stability and biodiversity. As of 2022, over 56 000 ha of degraded lands have been restored with almost 90 000 people involved.

Despite these positive outcomes, the Great Green Wall project has been criticised for limited implementation, governance challenges and insufficient local participation. Although the project is African led, most funding and design is international. The Great Green Wall is a top-down project with the state implementing changes to the local populations' lives, which can lead to conflict over land access or land use changes, particularly where it affects pastoral mobility. Concerns have been raised that restoration efforts could reinforce marginalisation if land boundaries, control of resources and structure of authority are reorganised, especially if the local population is not included in the restoration efforts. Furthermore, the unequal distribution of economical benefits generated by the project, such as permission to harvest (food or timber) or new job opportunities have led to tensions among locals and with project managers.

Furthermore, afforestation efforts have been stifled by choosing trees that are ill-suited for arid areas and the establishment of monocultures, which reduces survival and increase vulnerability to disease. Trade offs between water for tree planting and locals' needs have raised concerns, with water scarcity reported in the Ferlo region of Senegal.

== See also ==
- Desert
- Dryland farming
