= Desert greening =

Process of man-made reclamation of deserts

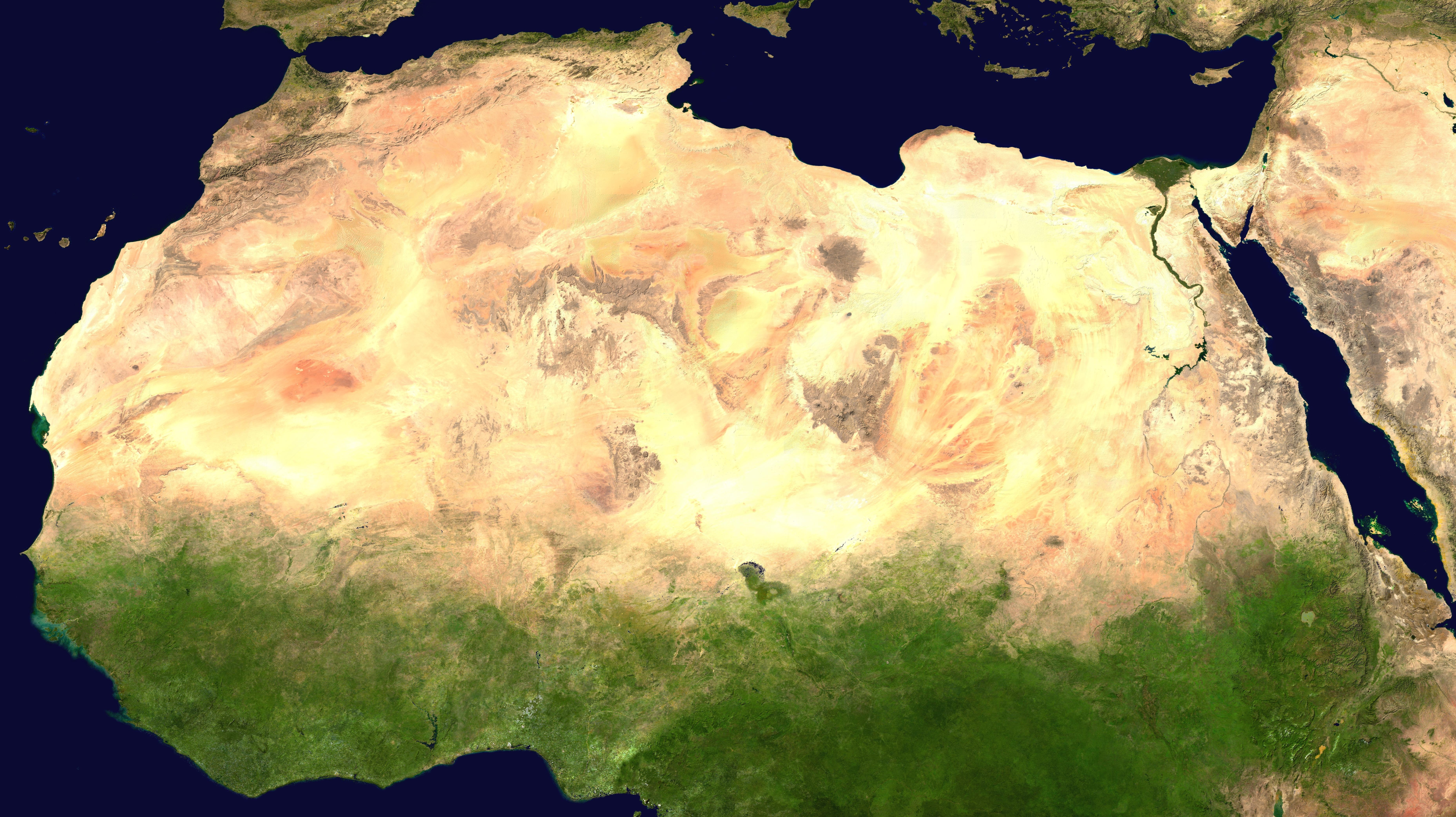
A satellite image of the Sahara, the world's largest hot desert and third largest desert after Antarctica and the Arctic.

Desert greening is the process of afforestation or revegetation of deserts for ecological restoration (biodiversity), sustainable farming and forestry, but also for reclamation of natural water systems and other ecological systems that support life. The term "desert greening" is intended to apply to both cold and hot arid and semi-arid deserts. It does not apply to ice capped or permafrost regions. It pertains to roughly 32 million square kilometres of land. Deserts span all seven continents of the Earth and make up nearly a fifth of the Earth's landmass, areas that recently have been increasing in size.

As some of the deserts expand and global temperatures increase, the different methods of desert greening may provide a possible response. Planting suitable flora in deserts has a range of environmental benefits from carbon sequestration to providing habitat for desert fauna to generating employment opportunities to creation of habitable areas for local communities.

The prevention of land desertification is one of 17 Sustainable Development Goals outlined by the United Nations. Desert greening is a process that aims to not only combat desertification but to foster an environment where plants can create a sustainable environment for all forms of life while preserving its integrity.

== Desert greening techniques ==
When establishing or re-establishing vegetation in desert ecosystems there are many factors to consider before implementing a specific strategy. It is important to account for factors such as the geographical location of the area, amount of annual precipitation, average temperature, soil quality, nutrient availability, native plant and animal life, along with the human impact when aiming to restore a degraded or disrupted desert biome.

=== Planting ===
Planting strategies in the desert are different from conventional planting practices, especially in the initial stages. Deserts are regions in which annual precipitation is considerably less than the evaporation, making it difficult for plants and animals that are not specialized to the biome to survive. One of the ways to ensure the success of the plant life is that prior to being planted in the desert, plants are often grown first in greenhouses, allowing for root systems to develop. Often the plant species that are planted in desert regions are those that are capable of surviving on limited water and able to withstand the sun's direct rays. However, deserts also vary, with some being hot and dry and others being semiarid, and plants that may survive in a coastal desert might not be able to endure the considerably higher temperatures of hot and dry deserts. Therefore, when planting in deserts as an effort to restore the ecosystem or to create a greener space it is important that the vegetation being planted is suitable to the desert in which it is being planted.

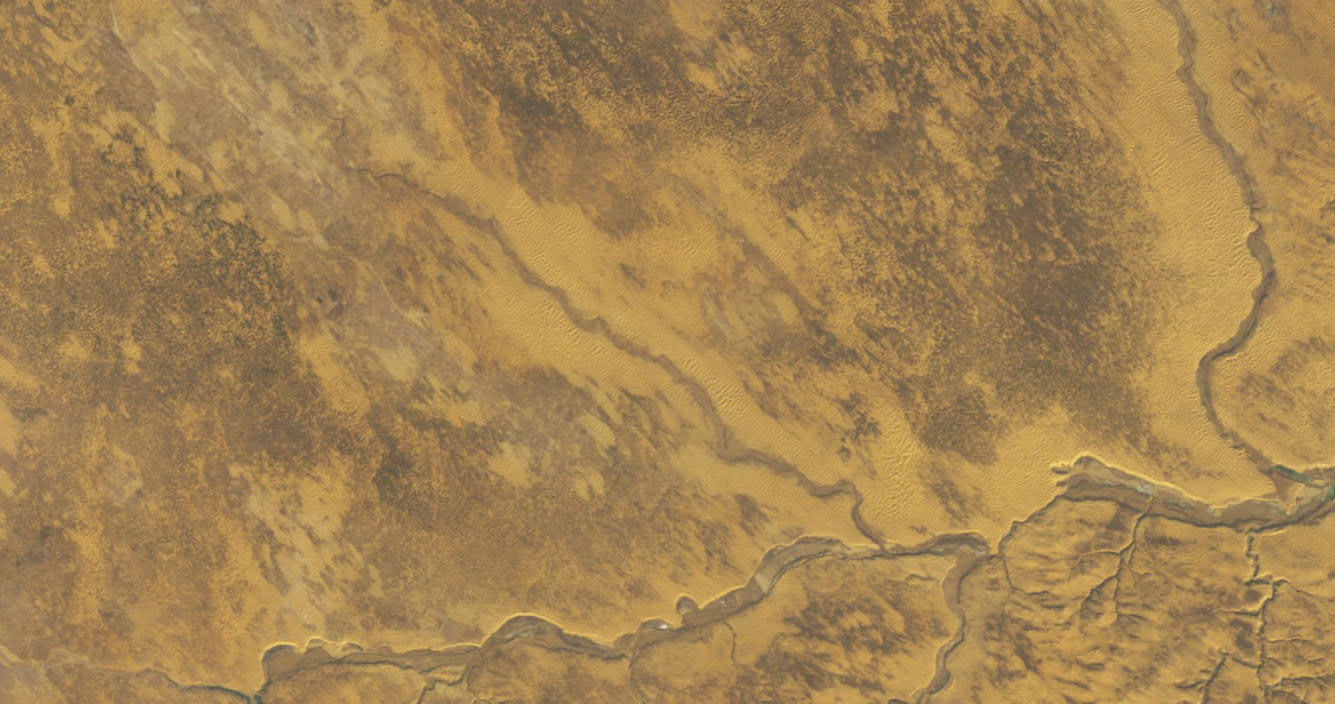
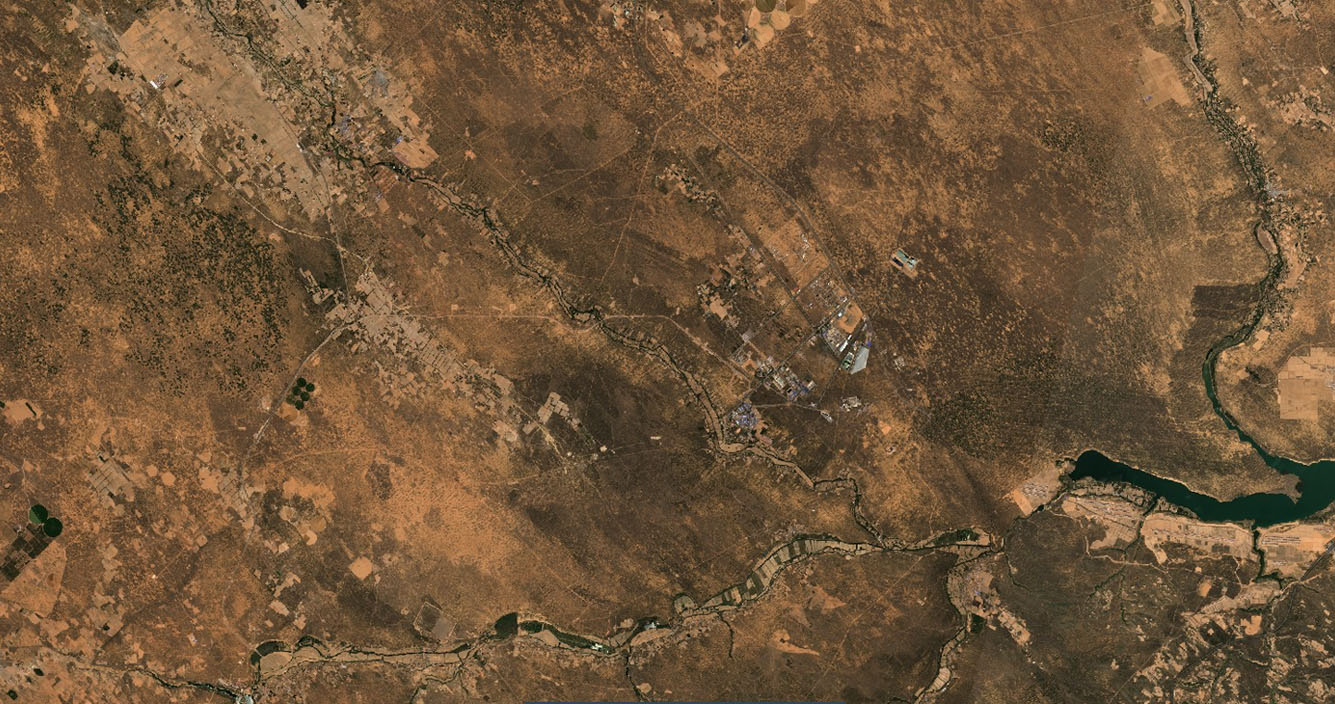
Reversing desertification of Mu Us Desert west of Yulin, Shaanxi. 1985 (above) and 2021 situation.

Utilizing pioneer desert species like the Acamptopappus shockleyi or Lepidium fremontii, which are native to the Mojave Desert, and halophytes such as Salicornia, contributes positively to desert greening efforts. Planted trees can store water, inhibit soil erosion through wind, raise water from underlying aquifers, reduce evaporation after a rain, attract animals (and thereby fertility through feces), and cause more rain to fall (by temperature reduction and other effects), if the planted area is large enough. Another method of introducing or re-introducing vegetation to deserts is through seeding which involves the scattering of seeds either manually or aerially depending upon the size of the region undergoing vegetation efforts. Using seeding as a desert greening technique on a large scale requires a longer time for the ecosystem to recover and for the vegetation to establish itself as was seen in the Mu Us Desert. Additionally, there are potential downsides due to the environmental vulnerability and predation by desert animals putting the success of this technique at risk.

=== Landscaping and green infrastructure ===
With the growth of human population in urban areas that are located close to deserts, ecoscaping has become an important strategy when designing and building infrastructure. Using the National Tree Benefit Calculator software it was established that if Acacia tortilis, Ziziphus spina-christi, and Phoenix dactylifera were planted in a desert city like Doha, this would yield a host of environmental benefits along with economic gains including carbon sequestration, air pollution reduction, lowering of the urban heat index, prevention of storm water runoff and increase in property values. As global temperatures increase, environmental impacts are considerably greater in dry regions with reduced precipitation levels which are vulnerable to desertification.

Some of the effects that are beneficial for desert-greening which trees offer can also be provided by buildings that have incorporated architectural elements that allow them to shade exposed walls consequently reducing the heat absorption by the building. Another example of a building designed to offer beneficial effects of vegetation in the desert is the IBTS Greenhouse.

=== Agriculture ===
Desert farming also known as desert agriculture or arid farming, refers to the practice of cultivating and growing crops in arid or desert regions where water scarcity and extreme climatic conditions pose significant challenges to traditional agriculture. Desert farming involves employing various techniques with the help of technology to overcome the agricultural limitations imposed by an arid environment. Some common approaches used in desert farming include water management, soil improvement, crop selection, shade and windbreaks, greenhouses and controlled environments. Overall, desert farming aims to maximize the efficient use of water resources while improving soil quality, and planting crops suitable to the environment to overcome the challenges of arid environments. This allows farmers to cultivate crops and sustain agricultural production in regions traditionally considered inhospitable for farming.

Greenhouse cultivation also known as greenhouse farming or controlled environment agriculture, refers to the practice of cultivating plants within an enclosed structure called a greenhouse. It is a method of crop production that involves creating a controlled environment to optimize plant growth and protect crops from external factors such as extreme weather conditions, pests, and diseases. In a greenhouse, various environmental factors such as temperature, humidity, light intensity, and carbon dioxide levels can be monitored and adjusted to create ideal growing conditions for plants. This is achieved using various technologies such as heating and cooling systems, ventilation, irrigation systems, artificial lighting, and pest control measures. Greenhouses are typically made of transparent materials like glass or plastic, which allow sunlight to enter while trapping heat inside. This helps maintain a warmer temperature compared to the outside environment, extending the growing season and enabling the cultivation of plants that are not naturally suited to the local climate.

Seawater greenhouses are innovative systems that use seawater to grow crops in arid and water-scarce regions. These greenhouses employ a combination of evaporative cooling, humidification, and desalination techniques to create a controlled environment for plant growth. One prominent example of a seawater greenhouse is the Seawater Foundation. The Seawater Foundation is a non-profit organization that aims to address global food and water scarcity by utilizing seawater greenhouses. Their greenhouse system uses evaporative cooling to create a humid atmosphere for crops while seawater is used for humidification and cooling purposes. Another notable example is the IBTS (Integrated Biosphere Tectonics Systems) Greenhouse, developed by Seawater Greenhouse Ltd, the IBTS Greenhouse utilizes seawater to cool and humidify the air inside the greenhouse. It incorporates solar desalination systems to convert seawater into freshwater, which is then used to irrigate the plants.

The concept of seawater greenhouses offers several advantages. Firstly, it allows for the cultivation of crops in arid regions with limited freshwater availability, reducing the pressure on traditional freshwater sources. Secondly, the humid and cooler environment created within these greenhouses promotes efficient plant growth, even in hot climates. Lastly, the evaporative cooling process can potentially produce freshwater as a byproduct, contributing to water sustainability. By harnessing the power of seawater and innovative greenhouse technologies, these initiatives are contributing to sustainable agriculture and addressing the challenges posed by water scarcity and climate change.

== Water resources management ==
=== Water availability ===
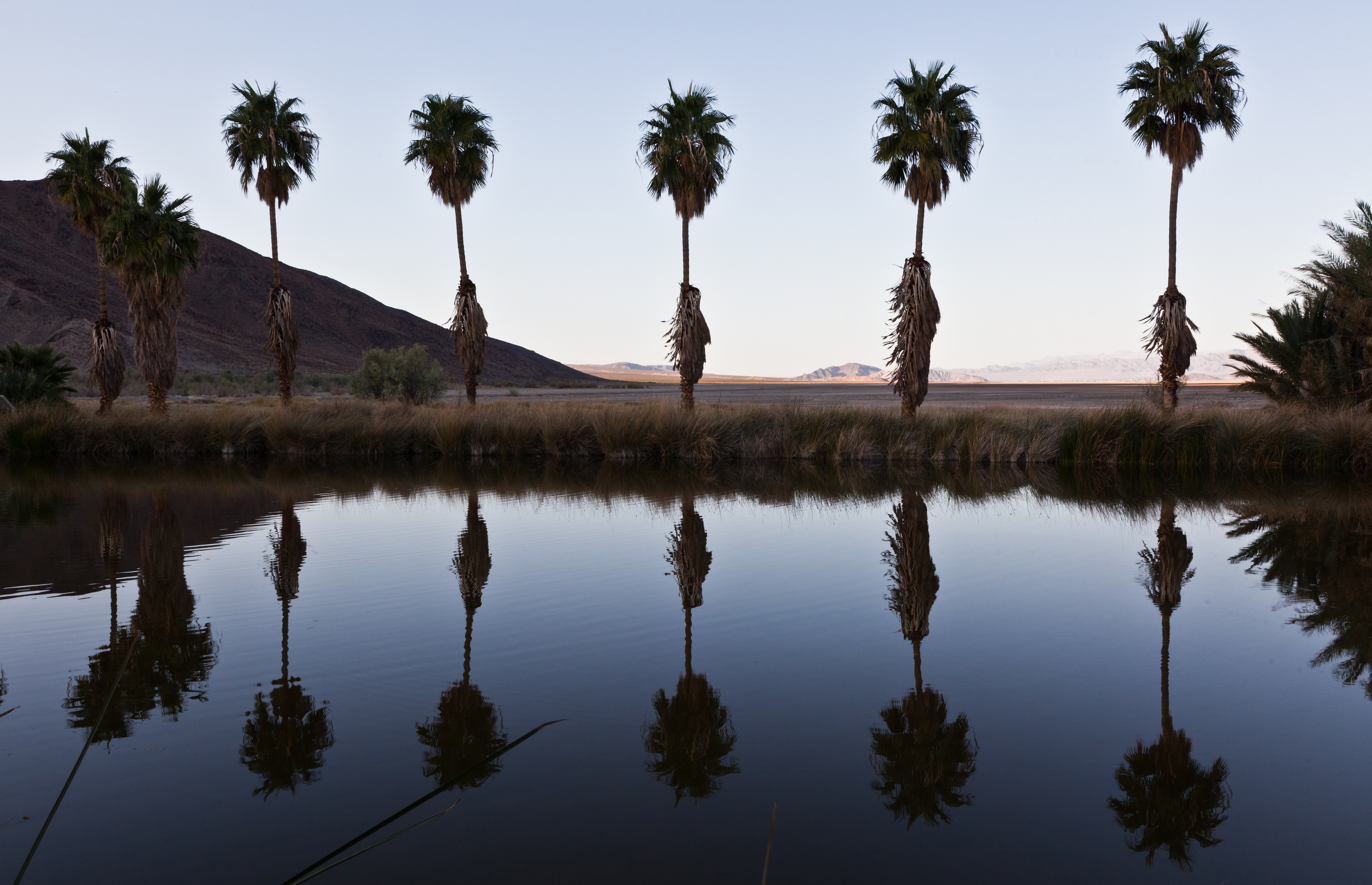
Lake Tuendae, an artificial pond at Zzyzx Desert Studies Center in the Mojave Desert.

Desert greening is substantially a function of water availability. Water can be made available through saving, reusing, rainwater harvesting, desalination, or direct use of seawater for salt-loving plants. Reuse of treated water and the closing of cycles is the most efficient because closed cycles stand for unlimited and sustainable supply – rainwater management is a decentralized solution and applicable for inland areas – desalination is very secure as long as the primary energy for the operation of the desalination plant is available. In the Sahara Forest Project desalination is carried out by solar stills for the generation of the freshwater. Another technique that is used is cloud seeding which helps in producing precipitation in areas with dryer climates.

With the new techniques and latest technology used to produce rainfall in areas that had dryer climates, there are often floods due to the urban infrastructure in those areas being insufficient for precipitation that exceeds conventional levels. Dehumidification is a technique that uses "atmospheric water generation" or air to water, used by the military for potable water generation. However, this technology uses 200 times more energy than desalination, making it unsuitable for large scale desert greening.

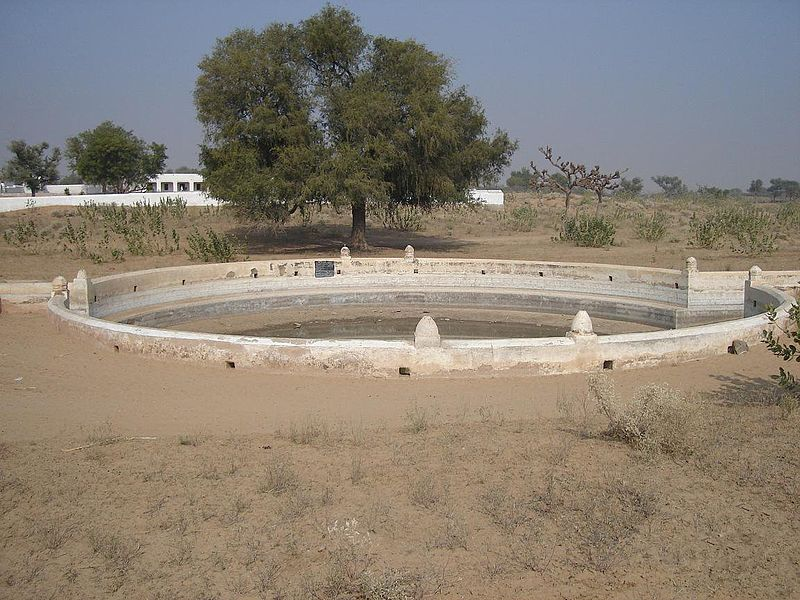
Rainwater harvesting

Collecting rainwater and storing it in ponds, reservoirs, or underground tanks is one of the simplest ways to improve soil moisture content, helping to increase green cover and crop production in arid areas. It is an effective method for increasing water availability in arid regions and can contribute to desert greening in several ways, such as increasing soil moisture so that farmers have a reliable water source for their crops, even during periods of low rainfall. Also, it plays an important role in recharging groundwater, since in many arid areas the groundwater is easily depleted, which could further exacerbate the aridity. This can help to combat desertification, reduce soil erosion, and promote biodiversity.

Additionally, it helps alleviate water scarcity in areas with limited access to reliable water sources. Rainwater harvesting can serve as a practical and sustainable solution. It reduces the stress on scarce water resources, such as rivers or underground wells, and it provides a decentralized water supply system. Overall, rainwater harvesting contributes to desert greening by increasing soil moisture, promoting vegetation growth, and conserving water resources. It is a cost-effective and environmentally friendly technique that can be implemented at various scales, from individual households to large-scale agricultural systems to make desert areas more productive and sustainable.

=== Water distribution ===
The fresh water or seawater contained in centralized systems may be distributed by canals or in some instances aqueducts (both options cause water to evaporate due to environmental exposure), troughs (as used in the Keita Project), earthenware piping (semi-open or closed) or even underground systems like qanāt. The mode of water distribution influences how its distribution to plants, which include drip irrigation (used only in pipes) a costly solution, wadis (V-shaped ponds dug in the earth) or by simply planting the trees in holes inside/over the water pipe itself allowing the roots access to the water straight from the pipe (used in qanāt, hydroponics etc.). Water can also be distributed through semi-open pipes as seen in the dug throughs in the Keita Project.

== Disadvantages ==
The use of water for desert greening in arid regions, however, is not without its disadvantages. Desert greening by the Helmand and Arghandab Valley Authority irrigation scheme in Afghanistan significantly reduced the water flowing from the Helmand River into Lake Hamun and this, together with drought, was cited as a key reason for the severe damage to the ecology of Lake Hamun, much of which has degenerated since 1999 from a wetland of international importance into salt flats. Similarly in northwestern China, desert greening practices fueled by economic and environmental benefits resulted in the exhaustion of the groundwater sources which impacted soil integrity.

== History ==
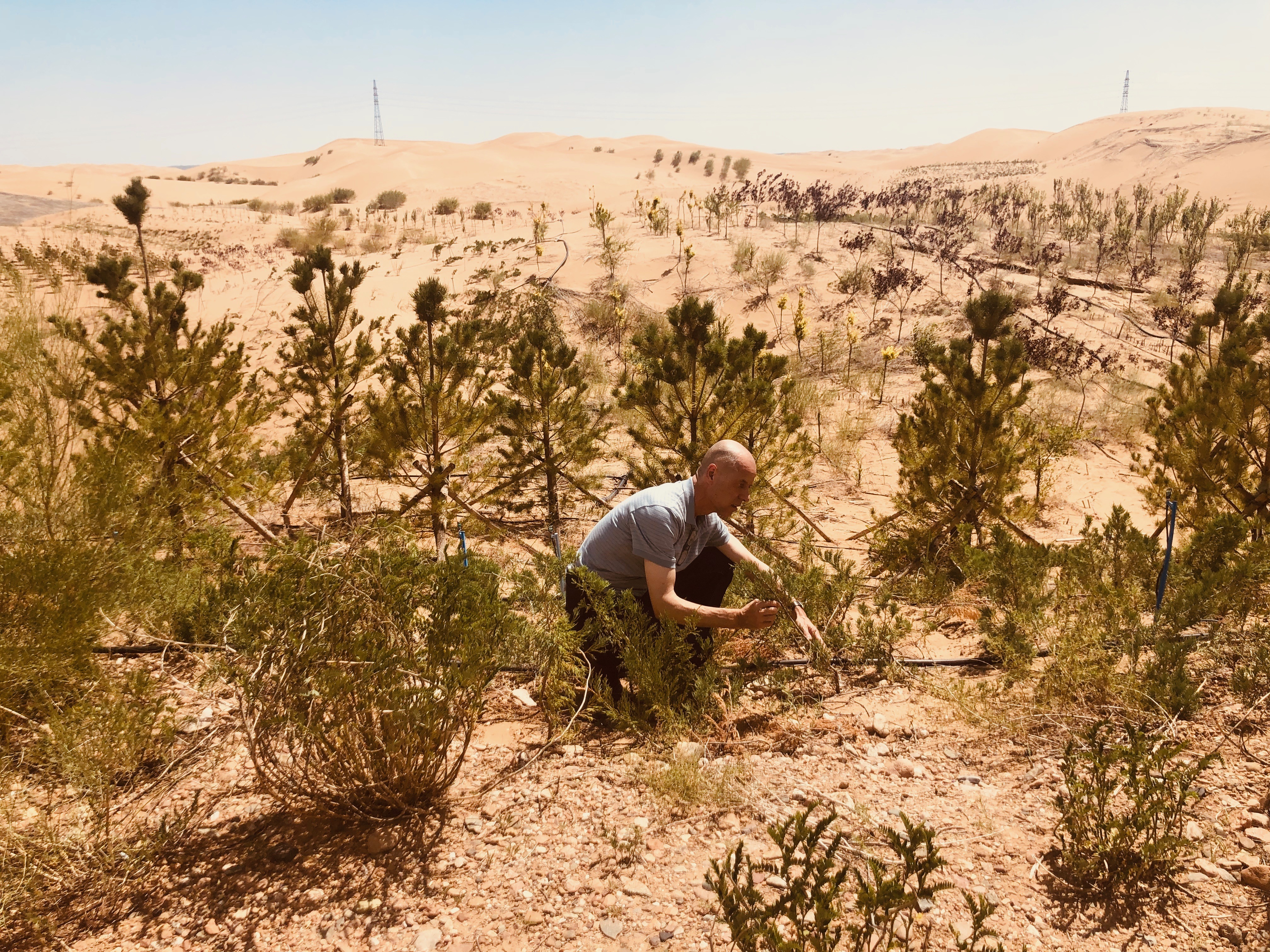
Reforestation in the Kubuqi Desert, China.

The practice of recent desert greening can be traced back to a Japanese horticulture professor and agriculturist, Seiei Toyama, who spent 30 years of his life in efforts to green the Kubuqi Desert in China. He authored the text Greening the Deserts: Techniques and Achievements of Two Japanese Agriculturists along with Masao Toyama which was published in 1995. During his time as a professor at Tottori University, Toyama was able to revitalize the surrounding sandy dunes into revenue generating farms through his irrigation techniques and knowledge of plant species.

After his retirement in 1972, he pursued agricultural projects in China which included the conservation of eroding banks of Yellow River by planting Kudzu vines, introduction of grape growing techniques in Ningxia Huizu Autonomous Region, and his most well known project in the Engebei Desert Development, an oasis in the Kubuqi Desert of Inner Mongolia.

== Examples ==
=== Asia ===
The history of modern desert greening in Asia focuses on initiatives that are aimed at reducing desertification and promoting sustainable land management practices. However, the challenges faced by nations in the Asian continent are varied, and the solutions have been tailored to meet specific needs. One of the earliest and most notable examples of desert greening in Asia occurred in China in the 1970s, the "Green Great Wall" program, aimed at planting trees along the border of the Gobi Desert to halt its expansion. The program involved planting over 100 billion trees across a thousand miles of desert within a decade. The initiative was successful in reducing sandstorms and increasing rainfall in the region, and the program has since been expanded to other parts of China.

In the Middle East, Israel's desert greening initiatives have been aimed at the Negev Desert. Initiatives include the establishment of research and development centers for desert agriculture, the introduction of drip irrigation techniques, and the use of treated wastewater for irrigation. In the Indian subcontinent, India and Pakistan's desert greening initiatives have focused on afforestation and soil conservation. These initiatives involve planting trees, shrubs, and grasses to hold the soil in place, prevent erosion, and improve water retention. Overall, the history of modern desert greening in Asia reflects the need to address environmental challenges such as desertification and promote sustainable land management practices. These initiatives have often been successful in addressing these challenges and improving the livelihoods of people in arid regions.

==== China ====
China's Green Great Wall Program

The Three-North Shelter Forest Program, also nicknamed the "Great Green Wall", is a series of windbreaking forests in China designed to hold back the expansion of the Gobi Desert and reduce the incidence of dust storms that have long caused problems for northern China, as well as also providing timber to the local population. The program started in 1978 with the proposed end result of raising northern China's forested area from 5 to 15 percent, and is planned to be completed around 2050, at which point it will be 4,500 km (2,800 mi) long. In 2008, winter storms destroyed 10% of the new forest stock, causing the World Bank to advise China to focus more on quality rather than quantity in its stock species.

As of 2009, China's planted forest covered more than 500,000 km^{2} (190,000 sq mi), increasing tree coverage from 12% to 18%. It is the largest artificial forest in the world. According to Foreign Affairs, the program successfully transitioned the economic model in the Gobi Desert region from ecologically harmful industrial farming and pastoralism to beneficial ecotourism, fruticulture and forestry. In 2018, United States' National Oceanic and Atmospheric Administration found the increase in forest coverage observed by satellites is consistent with the Chinese government data. According to Shixiong Cao, an ecologist at Beijing Forestry University, the Chinese Government recognized the water shortage problems in arid regions and changed the approach towards vegetation with lower water requirements. Zhang Jianlong, head of the Forestry Department, told the media that the goal was to sustain the health of vegetation and choose suitable plant species and irrigation techniques.

According to BBC News report in 2020, China's tree plantation programs resulted in significant carbon fixation and helped mitigated climate change, and the benefit was underestimated by previous research. The program also reversed the desertification of the Gobi desert, which grew 10,000 km^{2} (3,900 sq mi) per year in the 1980s, but had shrunk by more than 2,000 km^{2} (770 sq mi) in 2022.

==== India ====
The soil of the Thar Desert in India remains dry for much of the year and is prone to soil erosion. High speed winds blow the soil from the desert, depositing it on neighboring fertile lands, and causing shifting sand dunes within the desert which bury fences and block roads and railway tracks. A permanent solution to shifting sand dunes can be provided by planting appropriate species on the dunes to prevent further movement and planting windbreaks and shelterbelts. These solutions also provide protection from hot or cold and desiccating winds and the invasion of sand. The Rajasthan Canal system in India is the major irrigation scheme of the Thar Desert and is intended to reclaim it.

There are few local tree species suitable for planting in the desert region and they are slow growing. Introduction of exotic tree species in the desert has become a necessity, many species of Eucalyptus, Acacia, Cassia and other genera from Israel, Australia, US, Russia, Zimbabwe, Chile, Peru, and Sudan have been tried in the Thar Desert. Vachellia tortilis has proved to be the most promising species for desert greening in this region. Prevention of shifting sand dunes can be accomplished through planting trees like the Vachellia tortilis near Laxmangarh town. Another promising species is jojoba which is economically valuable as well.

=== Africa ===
Modern desert greening in Africa is a relatively recent phenomenon and was primarily initiated in the 1950s and 1960s. The initiative was largely driven by a desire to combat desertification, the process by which fertile land becomes barren and unsuitable for farming, across the continent. One of the earliest and most notable examples of desert greening in Africa occurred in Algeria. In the 1950s, the Algerian government launched an ambitious program to transform over 20,000 square kilometers of arid land into productive agricultural land. This project involved the construction of dams, wells, and irrigation networks, as well as the introduction of modern farming techniques and seed varieties. The program was part of a broader effort to address food insecurity and improve livelihoods in rural areas. In the following decades, similar projects were undertaken in other countries, such as Mali, Niger, and Senegal. These initiatives focused on promoting sustainable agriculture and land management practices, as well as reforestation and the protection of natural ecosystems. Some of the key strategies employed included the use of drought-resistant crops, the introduction of agroforestry techniques, and the establishment of community-based management systems.

In recent years, desert greening efforts have also been boosted by the development of renewable energy technologies, such as solar and wind power. These technologies provide a sustainable source of energy for desert regions, which can be used to power irrigation systems and other farming equipment. Greening projects that integrate renewable energy solutions are often more effective and cost-efficient in the long run. Overall, modern desert greening in Africa has made significant progress in reducing the impact of desertification and improving the sustainability of agriculture and natural resource management in arid areas. However, many challenges remain, such as lack of funding, political instability, and climate change. As such, ongoing research and development of innovative strategies, including the integration of new technologies, will be essential for continued success in this area.

The "Great Green Wall of the Sahara and the Sahel" is a project adopted by the African Union in 2007, initially conceived as a way to combat desertification in the Sahel region and hold back expansion of the Sahara Desert by planting a wall of trees stretching across the entire Sahel from Djibouti City to Dakar. The original dimensions of the "wall" were slated to be 15 km (9.3 mi) wide and 7,775 km (4,831 mi) long, but the program has expanded to encompass nations in both North and West Africa. The modern green wall has since evolved into a program promoting water harvesting techniques, greenery protection and improving indigenous land use techniques, aimed at creating a mosaic of green and productive landscapes across North Africa. The ongoing goal of the project is to restore 100 million hectares of degraded land and capture 250 million tonnes of carbon dioxide, and create 10 million jobs in the process all by 2030.

As of March 2019, 15 per cent of the wall was complete with significant gains made in Nigeria, Senegal and Ethiopia. In Senegal, over 11 million trees had been planted. Nigeria has restored 4,900,000 ha (12,000,000 acres; 49,000 km^{2}) of degraded land, and Ethiopia has reclaimed 15,000,000 ha (37,000,000 acres; 150,000 km^{2}). A report commissioned by the United Nations Convention to Combat Desertification (UNCCD) was published on September 7, 2020, that the Great Green Wall had only covered 4% of the planned area, with only 4,000,000 ha (9,900,000 acres; 40,000 km^{2}) planted. Ethiopia has had the most success with 5.5 billion seedlings planted, but Chad has only planted 1.1 million. Doubt was also raised over the survival rate of the 12 million trees planted in Senegal.

In January 2021, the project received a boost at the One Planet Summit, where its partners pledged 14.3 billion USD to launch the Great Green Wall Accelerator, aimed at facilitating the collaboration and coordination among donors and involved stakeholders across 11 countries. In September 2021, the French Development Agency estimated that 20 million hectares have been restored and 350,000 jobs have been created. According to the second edition of the Global Land Outlook' published by the UNCCD in April 2022, one reason the project has experienced implementation challenges is the political risk associated with investing in more fragile nations as well as the fact that many "GGW projects generate low economic returns compared to the significant environmental and social benefits accrued that often have little or no market value". Furthermore, international donors seem to favor investing in more stable nations, picking and choosing which projects they will fund, and leaving nations with less stable governments behind.

=== Australia ===
Australia is the world's driest inhabited continent, with a significant portion covered by arid or semi-arid deserts. In recent years, there have been various efforts and initiatives focused on desert greening in Australia. One notable example is the "Great Green Wall" project, inspired by similar initiatives in Africa, which aims to create a vegetation barrier of local native plants across Australia's east coast to prevent desertification and erosion. Another approach to desert greening in Australia involves the use of regenerative farming and land management techniques. These techniques aim to restore degraded soils and improve water retention, which can support the growth of vegetation and increase biodiversity. Additionally, there are ongoing research and development projects that explore innovative techniques to facilitate desert greening, such as solar-powered desalination plants, drought-resistant crop varieties, and the use of native plant species that can thrive in arid environments. The success of desert greening initiatives depends on various factors, including local climate conditions, access to water resources, suitable plant species, and sustainable land management practices.

Sundrop Farms launched a greenhouse in 2016 to produce 15,000 tonnes of tomatoes using only desert soil and desalinated water piped from Spencer Gulf.

== See also ==
- Al Baydha Project
- Algerian Green Dam
- Arid Forest Research Institute
- Effects of climate change on the water cycle
- Fertilizer tree
- Oasification
- Straw checkerboard
- Restoration ecology
- United Nations Convention to Combat Desertification
