= IBTS Greenhouse =

Egyptian desalination project

The IBTS (“Integrated Biotectural System") greenhouse is a biotectural, urban development project suited for hot arid deserts. It was part of the Egyptian strategy for the afforestation of desert lands from 2011 until spring of 2015, when geopolitical changes like the Islamic State of Iraq and the Levant – Sinai Province in Egypt forced the project to a halt. The project begun in spring 2007 as an academic study in urban development and desert greening. It was further developed by Nicol-André Berdellé and Daniel Voelker as a private project until 2011. Afterwards LivingDesert Group including Prof. Abdel Ghany El Gindy and Dr. Mosaad Kotb from the Central Laboratory for Agricultural Climate in Egypt, Forestry Scientist Hany El Kateb, Agroecologist Wil van Eijsden and permaculturist Sepp Holzer was created to introduce the finished project in Egypt.

The IBTS Greenhouse, together with the programme for the afforestation of desert lands in Egypt, became part of relocation strategies. These play a role in Egypt as urbanization of the Nile Delta is a problem for the agricultural sector and because of infrastructural problems like traffic congestion in Cairo.

The IBTS features sea-water farming but inside a large greenhouse. All of the evaporated water can thus be harvested. The generation of liquid water from the atmosphere inside the IBTS requires large amounts of cooling power. This is done with the incoming sea-water. Thus the cooling requirement and the cooling power are always balanced.

The IBTS relies on a new quality of systems integration including architectural, technological and natural elements. It combines food production and residence, as well as desalination of sea water, or brackish groundwater. A CAE demonstration project using real weather-, soil and economic conditions proved feasibility under hyperarid conditions.

The relevance of the IBTS is its capacity for water Desalination with an efficiency of 0.45kwh per cubic metre of distillate. This is because operational cost for Desalination utilities far outweigh initial building cost over time. Also because the energy requirement for Desalination plants reach up into the GigaWatt region. The dependence on large amounts of fossil energy leaves water provision from industrial plants insecure. Through the high efficiency, Desalination has become financially and ecologically viable for large scale agriculture, forestry and aquaculture.

Another point of relevance is the creation of a bio-diverse landscape and many jobs instead of smoking chimneys and factories along the valuable waterfront. Particular relevance also lies in the applicability inland, also that would exclude the high Desalination capacity.

The building has its roots in construction engineering and construction physics in contrast to food production as it is for most greenhouses. It is fundamentally different from the seawater greenhouses. It differs for its performance in desalination. Alternative desalination-technologies, air-to-water utilities and desalination-greenhouses in testing, require a multiple of the energy for fresh-water production.

The significance of the term Integration lies within the efficiency that systems integration can achieve, by imitation of natural systems, especially closed cycles. The establishment of closed watercycles being the most crucial of all, because of the increasing severity of the Global Water crisis particularly in hot desert climates.

The industrial-scale desalination is bound to hot climates because it requires high amounts of solar thermal power. It has turned out to be suitable in mitigation of the sinking of water tables in agricultural areas of the MENA region and beyond. In future versions the IBTS can be deployed in cold climates using extra heat energy sources like compact fusion, or small modular reactors.

== Charging the watercycle ==
The IBTS can be charged by seawater, which is turned into freshwater by evaporation. This is the primary type because it is important. Seawater is unlimited and the IBTS can thus produce excess water for sale.

At the beginning of the saltwater charging lies the seawater farming operation inside the IBTS Greenhouse. This only requires small amounts of seawater. Most of the water flows through the food-production system and is then processed in the full-desalination utility.

The IBTS can also be charged by a continuous inflow of organic matter for the workers, animals, and later residents. The organic matter, which is food and drink first, is regained through waste treatment. The waste-water treatment is part of the ordinary water cycle. The organic matter is partly infiltrated underground into the root zones of the plants and partly processed in septic tanks and then applied as topsoil in the forestry. This concept has been implemented inside residential homes (A common type is an Earthship).

In general, it is possible to build the IBTS as solids and liquids waste treatment sites for settlements, hotels, or cities.

The water cycle can also be charged by a single rain event, which does occur in the desert and can be counted on. Lastly, it is possible to charge the water cycle by pumping saline or contaminated groundwater and to some extent by atmospheric water generation.

The volume of water inside the water cycle is not important as it is a quasi-closed cycle, causing evaporation from soil and exhaled moisture from people getting captured under the roof.

Losses occur due to the export of food and in case of a leak in the roof. Leaks would occur frequently under normal conditions. The Skyroof is maintained with a special refurbishment and replacement system that can deal with harsh weather and objects landing on the thin foil.

== Charging the nutrient cycle ==
The nutrient cycle is connected to the watercycle. Charging it mainly means the practice of building up soil fertility and soil organic matter. This can entail import of biomass through organic waste, but mainly by biowaste from the production of food inside the IBTS. In sea-water systems the biomass is created from salt-tolerant plants called halophytes. Biomass yields of up to 52 tons per hectare per year have been recorded. Moreover, the biomass generation of roots are important for Carbon sequestration. This is up to 35t/ha*y extra. The IBTS-Greenhouse is a Blue Carbon project. A third source of biomass are external seawater farms, which do not require the pricy space under the roof of the IBTS. These can be on land or in sea. Most noteworthy are seaweed farms.

Just as the nutrient cycle has to be charged with biomass there is an option to charge the atmosphere inside the IBTS, or seaweed water-ponds, with CO_{2}. This would increase the biomass yield. This process has certain limits. One is the availability of trace element like phosphorus required by any organism. As the best source for the charging with additional CO_{2} would be industrial waste CO_{2} this is another way in which the IBTS can function as waste treatment site.

== Performance ==
The energy of operation is 0.45 kWh per cubic metre of distilled water in the full-scale version. This performance is more than 10 times lower than the records set by desalination plants in Dubai and Perth according to official numbers given by the respective authorities. The IBTS is based on a modular concept, with a core size of 1 hectare. This is the minimum size for the construction and for self-sufficiency, but the circular, architectural modules can be built 10 hectare large, or more. Each module is based on sub-modules allowing for immediate commencement of operation and generation of profit (like a re-afforestation site generating profit in its early stages). Best efficiency and full capacity can be provided with a superstructure approximately 100 modules large. 10 km^{2} have the capacity of an industrial desalination plant, which is 0,5 million cubic meters of water per day. Since the first version of the IBTS the atmospheric water generation has evolved through a series of hygrothermal models and can now be operated at 0.45 kwh/m^{3} according to the developer. The IBTS works with natural processes in closed cycles, hosted in a building. Therefore, it never hits natural, or physical limitations for growth like the desalination technology in the Persian Gulf already has because of brine discharge and temperature rise.

== Primary energy ==
The IBTS is operated with electrical and thermal energy produced from windpower and concentrated solar power, on-site (in a proprietary process). This means that the energy requirement and the use of primary energy can be considered the same, which is not the case for common desalination plants.

Common desalination plants are dependent on power-plants using fossil fuels. Accounting for energy-loss during the energy transformation in the power-plant, common desalination plants use 2-3 times more energy than stated in the usual performance data. These are common factors for energy-conversion losses for the combustion engines used in the desalination industry.

Taking this into account the IBTS uses less than 5% of the current efficiency world-record. This industrial record is about 3.5kWh/m^{3} plus ca. 1.0kWh/m^{3} for seawater pumping and other factors not accounted for. It is multiplied with the efficiency of primary energy use. Together 9-14 kWh/m^{3}.

The term of primary energy should be combined with energy quality for realistic understanding. Energy quality in context of desalination shows a new picture for the overall efficiency not only of the physical process of desalination, but the overall economic efficiency of the IBTS using proprietary renewable energy.

== Design ==
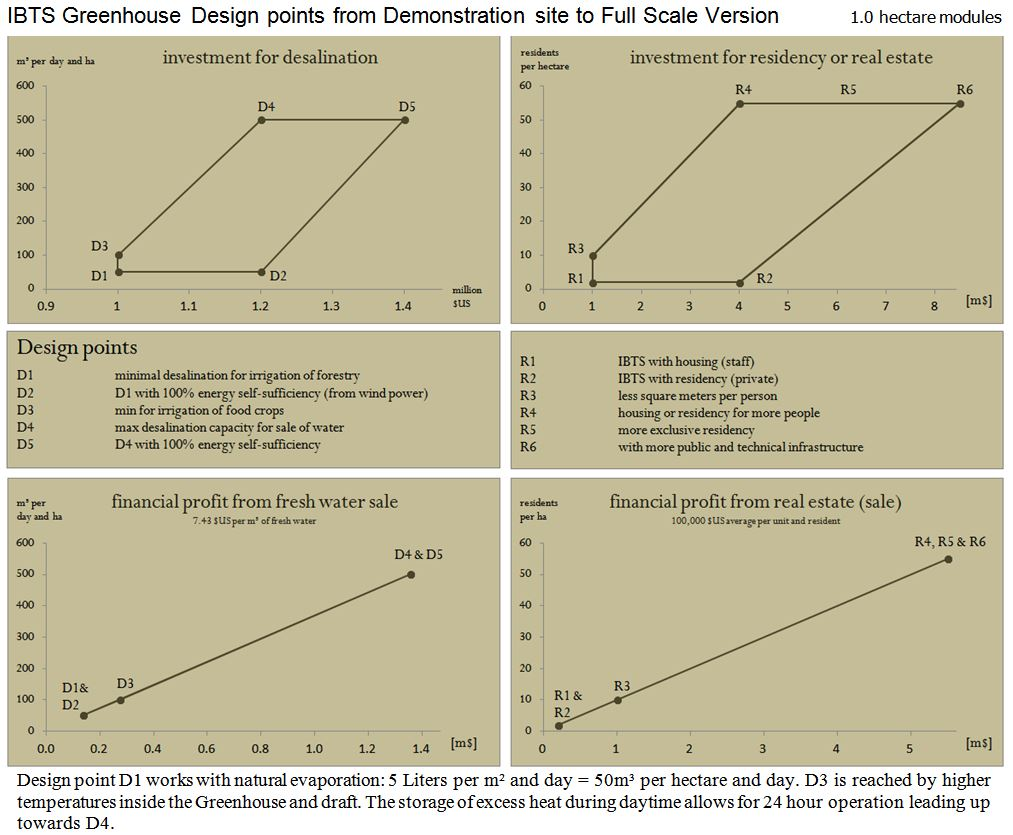
Financial planning with design points

The maximum of 500m³ of freshwater production per day and hectare, multiplies to 0.5 million m³ on 1000 ha, equaling the output of the largest industrial desalination power plants in the world. It is reached by heat-recovery from the hot fresh-water. This recovered energy is used to heat the brine leaving the Mariculture in the IBTS doubling the daily evaporation of 100m³ and generating salt for sale. The recovered energy is also used to preheat incoming salt-water for the Mariculture. The chosen breed of fish needs warm water and that warm water also increases the natural evaporation inside the Greenhouse. The design points arose out of the computational engineering of the physical model as well as the financial plan in an iterative process.

== Economic implications ==
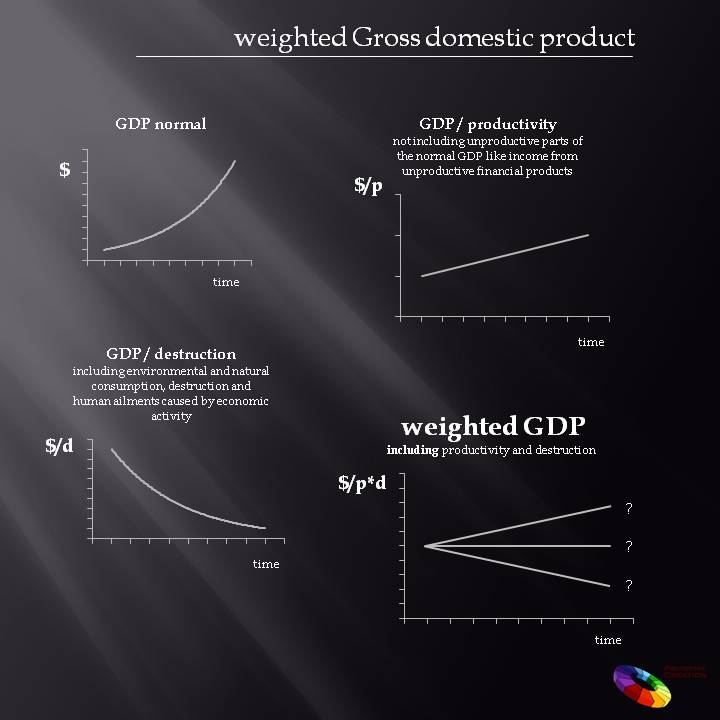
Weighted GDP

Because of the independence of primary energy- and material resources, the efficiency of water production and the scalable, modular design the IBTS Greenhouse is sustainable. A strategic, national infrastructure project like the IBTS allows for the successful energy-transition into a sustainable economy.

This can be understood by a comparison of GDP growth, the generation of real values and a weighted GDP.

An example for the infrastructure services of the IBTS Greenhouse is water purification. Wastewater is percolated into the ground and provides water and nutrients for the growth of trees. This is not so easy with food crops for hygienic reasons. Thus the IBTS provides sewage treatment in countries, or areas that lack treatment plants

The IBTS Greenhouse is an open concept compatible with most other technologies and practices for water- energy- and food production. It is plugin-ready for upcoming technologies like nuclear power from compact fusion, the traveling wave reactor, or breeder reactors. When these energy sources become available they can be integrated into existing IBTS infrastructure and generate even more fresh water without brine discharge into natural water bodies and the appending environmental problems. For infrastructure developments taking decades for the roll-out and upscaling it is crucial to design in terms of future-readiness, a key engineering principle.

The manufacturing process of the IBTS is designed for automation, which requires more electricity than common construction sites, or manufacturing processes. This platform design is also future ready for more available energy. An example is the large roof of the IBTS, which needs to be observed and cleaned continuously and refurbished several times over the lifecycle of the IBTS. This can only be done by special bots, or drones on the scale that the IBTS was developed for as national desert greening strategy for reclaiming and regreening entire regions.

== Examples of other biotecture ==
The most famous example is the Biosphere 2, a research project and demonstration site integrating residential areas into a new type of greenhouse. It was designed to be self-sufficient including food production in an ecosystemic context. Another example for Biotecture, which is foremost a residential home, is an Earthship. Earthships incorporate water-purification and reuse on multiple levels.

Since 2010 urban developments labeled Forest Cities, drawing from the IBTS and other pioneer projects have been created. The Gardens by the Bay using all of the core design elements of the TSPC Forest City from 2008 like artificial trees with spherical buildings on top is an outstanding example. The Liuzhou Forest City is one of many examples for green architecture, respectively green urban developments of new cities with a lot of green areas, including the facades of buildings.

The international efforts to create Forest Cities are another level of implication. China is going forward with the introduction of several hundred designated Forest Cities. One of the latest examples is Shenzhen.

== See also ==
- Closed ecological system
- Earth systems engineering and management
- Environmental management
- Industrial ecology
- Life-support system
- Multidisciplinary approach
- Seawater greenhouse
- Systems engineering
