= Forest Citys =

Forest Citys may refer to:

- Forest City, an American professional baseball team that played in Cleveland, Ohio, from 1870 to 1872, today generally referred to as the Cleveland Forest Citys
- Forest City, an American professional baseball team that played in Rockford, Illinois, in 1871, today generally referred to as the Rockford Forest Citys

== See also ==
- Forest City
