= Forest City =

Forest City may refer to:

== Place names ==
=== Canada ===
- Forest City, New Brunswick, a rural community in York County

=== China ===
- Liuzhou Forest City, a planned urban forest project in Liuzhou, Guangxi

=== Malaysia ===
- Forest City, Johor, a real estate megaproject in Iskandar Puteri, Johor

=== United States ===
- Forest, California, a small unincorporated community in Sierra County
- Forest City, Florida, a census-designated place in Seminole County
- Forest City, Illinois, a village in Mason County
- Forest City, Iowa, a city in Hancock County and Winnebago County
- Forest City, Kansas, an unincorporated community in Barber County
- Forest City, Maine, a populated place in Washington County
- Forest City, Missouri, a city in Holt County
- Forest City, Minnesota, an unincorporated community in Meeker County
- Forest City, a hamlet within Croghan, New York
- Forest City, North Carolina, a town in Rutherford County
- Forest City, Pennsylvania, a borough in Susquehanna County
- Forest City, South Dakota, an unincorporated community in Potter County
- Forest City, Utah, a ghost town in Utah County
- Forest City Township (disambiguation)

== Place nicknames ==
"The Forest City", a nickname for:

=== Canada ===
- London, Ontario

=== United States ===
- Atlanta, Georgia
- The Forest City, Cleveland, Ohio
- Portland, Maine
- Rockford, Illinois

== Sports ==
- Forest City, an American professional baseball team that played in Cleveland, Ohio, from 1870 to 1872; see Cleveland Forest Citys
- Forest City, an American professional baseball team that played in Rockford, Illinois, in 1871; see Rockford Forest Citys

== Other ==
- Forest City (ship), a passenger steamer that was burned and sunk in 1907
- Forest City Joe (1926–1960), American blues musician
- Forest City Realty Trust, a real estate development company based in Cleveland, Ohio

== See also ==
- Forrest City, Arkansas
