= Straw checkerboard =

Anti-desertification technique

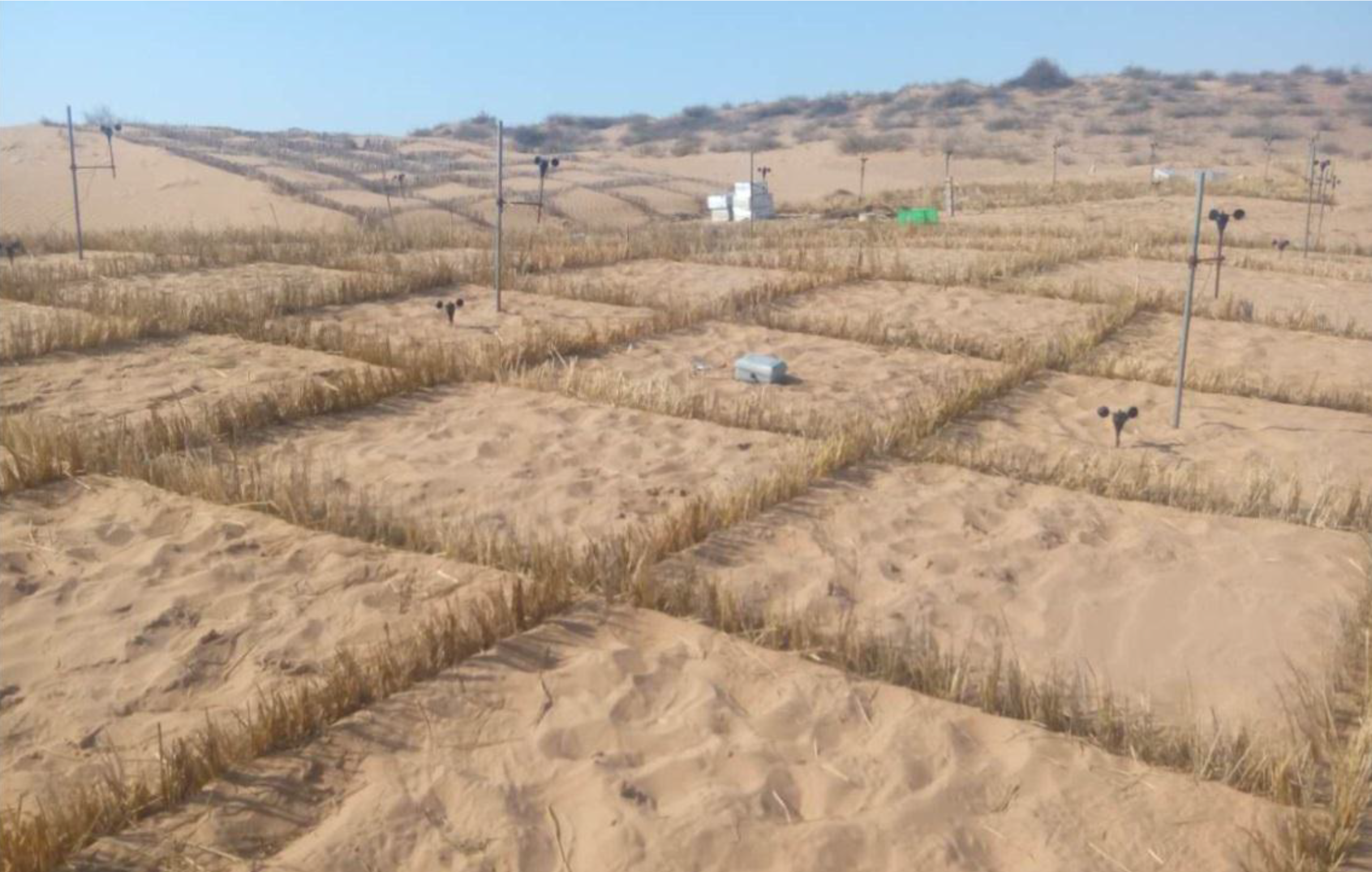
Semi-buried straw checkerboard

The straw checkerboard technique is used for fixing sand dunes to fight desertification. Straw of wheat, rice and reeds are placed in the shape of a checkerboard and half buried. It has a windbreak effect and contributes to soil formation through the increase of organic matter of the surface soil.

It was conceived at the Shapotou Desert Research Station of the Chinese Academy of Sciences in 1955 to protect the Baotou–Lanzhou railway crossing the Tengger Desert, where planting of sand-fixing plants without irrigation was carried out as early as 1956. It was earlier used in the Soviet Union, which used the technique during the construction of a railway in the Karakum Desert in Central Asia. It is widely used in China.

A 2004 study concluded that it is "a very effective technique, with wide application for sand dune fixation both in China and around the world." while a 2013 study described it as "the most representative antidesertification measure." Straw checkerboards and planting shrubs are successful methods for mobile sand dune stabilization and desertified grassland restoration in semiarid regions. Another study found that straw checkerboard barriers are more suitable for sand fixation in weak wind areas, while rocky checkerboard barriers are more suitable in strong wind areas. Traditionally done by hand, an automated straw checkerboard laying machine has been developed that is 53 times faster than manual methods.

It has seen limited use in Iran, Ghana, Egypt, Mongolia.
