= Seiei Toyama =

Japanese environmentalist who combated desertification in China

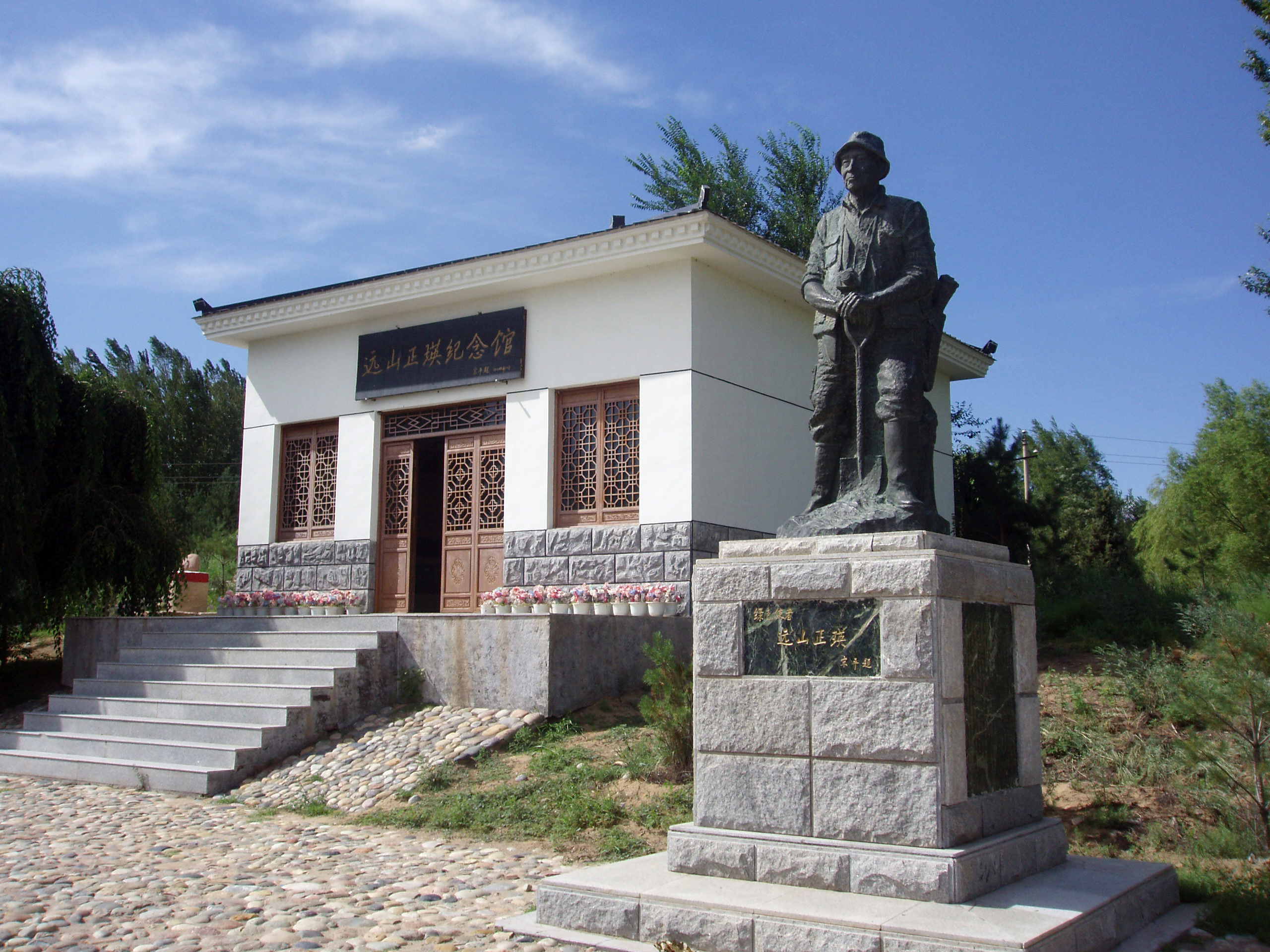
Masahide Toyama Statue

Seiei Toyama (遠山正瑛, Toyama Seiei) (April 21, 1906 – February 25, 2004) is a Japanese environmentalist. He received the 2003 Ramon Magsaysay Award for Peace and International Understanding for his two-decade-long effort to combat desertification in China, promoting solidarity and peace.

== Early life and education ==
He was born in Shinkura, Mizuho Village, Minamitsuru County (now part of Fujiyoshida City). Toyama was the third of six children in a family that lived in the Taisho-Ji temple of the Jodo Shinshu Hongan-Ji sect. He attended Yamanashi Prefectural Hikawa Junior High School (now Hikawa High School) and graduated from the Faculty of Agriculture at Kyoto Imperial University. In 1934, at age 28, the Ministry of Foreign Affairs sent him to study land and agriculture in China, where he witnessed the Gobi Desert’s erosion that devastated farmland and caused starvation for over 20 million people. He declined an offer to buy a 15-year-old girl for 30 yen amid famine relief efforts. The Second Sino-Japanese War forced his return to Japan in 1936.In 1962, Toyama earned a doctorate in agriculture from Kyoto University with a thesis titled “Study on the Special Environment of Sand Dune Areas and Adapted Crops.” He retired in 1971.

== Desertification efforts ==
In 1972, after Japan and China normalized diplomatic relations, Toyama traveled to China alone, funding the trip himself. He targeted a desert as large as Shikoku, known as the “land of death,” which had displaced over 20 million people. Walking dozens of kilometers daily in temperatures exceeding 40°C, he discovered a water source. Inspired by the Tottori Sand Dunes, he raised funds in Japan and collected 70 million kudzu seeds, suitable for desert growth, over eight years.

At age 80, Toyama and his team planted 3,000 kudzu seeds in China, but grazing goats consumed them overnight. Switching to poplar trees, they faced losses from insufficient moisture and Yellow River flooding. By using a water-retaining polymer from Japanese diapers and replanting with local cooperation, they transformed 20,000 hectares of desert into farmland within a year, enabling vegetable cultivation and residents to return. His work appeared in the NHK documentary Project X: Chôsensha tachi (プロジェクトX 挑戦者たち, Project X: The Challengers).

In 1991, Toyama founded the NPO Japan Desert Greening Association, leading volunteers to plant poplar trees in China’s Kubuqi Desert. In 1996, China honored him with a bronze statue, a distinction shared only with Mao Zedong during their lifetimes. In 2003, he received the Ramon Magsaysay Award, often called the Asian Nobel Prize, for Peace and International Understanding.

Toyama died of pneumonia on February 25, 2004, at age 97 in Tottori City. In November 2005, the Toyama Masaaki Memorial Room opened at Kodomo no Kuni in the Tottori Sand Dunes.

His son, Masao Toyama, continued his legacy with a reforestation project in Zambia starting in 1989.
