= Oasification =

Antonym to desertification by soil erosion

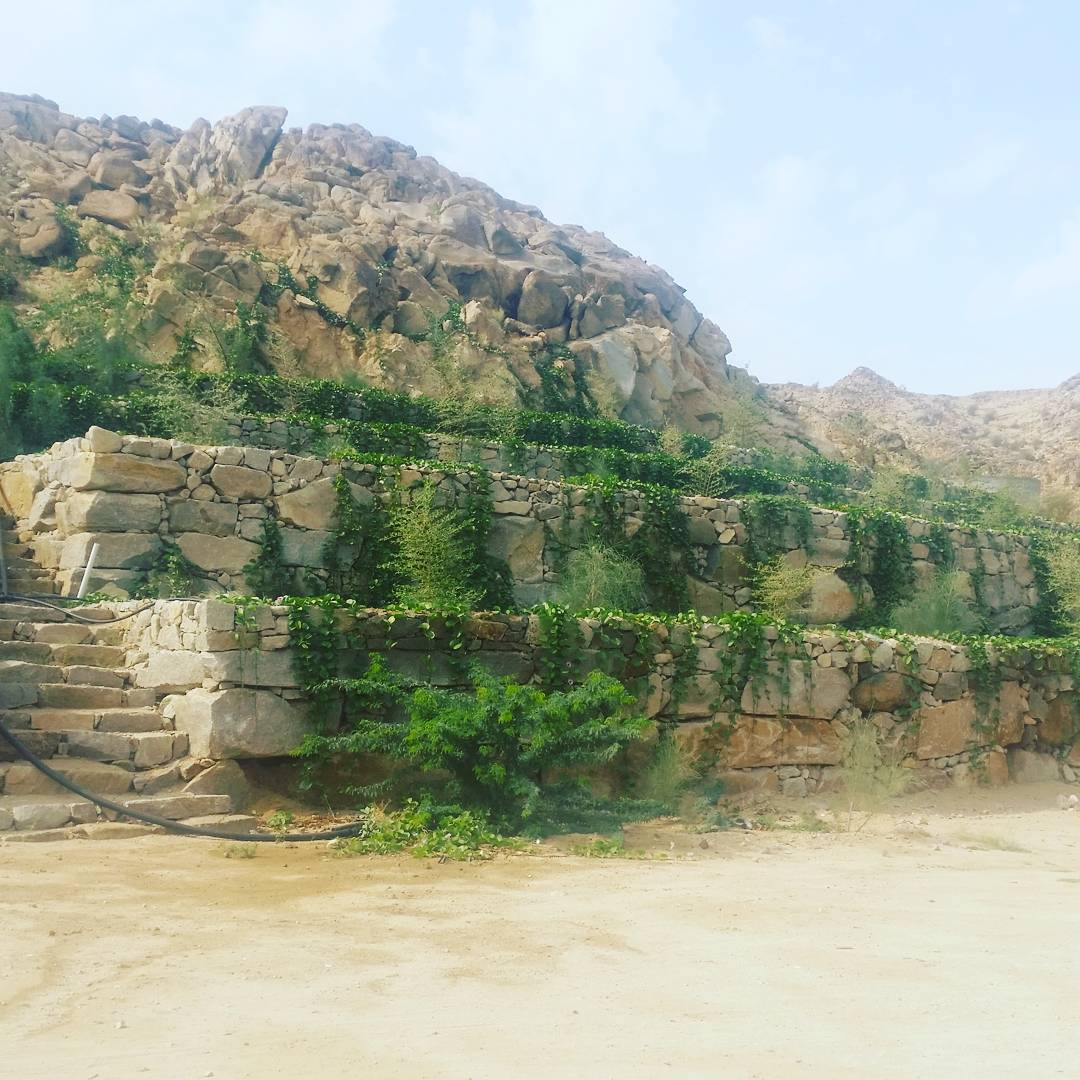
Terraces at Al Baydha in Saudi Arabia after a desert-greening project.

In hydrology, oasification is the antonym to desertification by soil erosion. This technique has limited application and is normally considered for much smaller areas than those threatened by desertification.

Oasification is also a developing direction of environmental engineering.

To help the oasification process, engineers aim to develop a thriving dense woody plant cover to redress the hydrological, edaphic and botanical degradation affecting a slope. This is done through appropriate soil preparation and the introduction of suitable plant species. It is also necessary to make adequate water harvesting systems—ideally taking advantage of the degradation process of the slope, collecting runoff water in ponds around the sites to be forested.

== History ==
The term "oasification" was coined in 1999 by Andrés Martínez de Azagra Paredes, PhD Forest Engineer and professor on Hydraulics and Forest Hydrology at E.T.S. of Agroforestry Engineering in Palencia, University of Valladolid, Spain.

== Usages ==
In oasification, soil and nutrient harvesting are regarded as fundamental component parts in the reclamation process of a degraded slope. Besides harvesting water, oasification preserves and accumulates soil and nutrients, helping to control water erosion—a common problem in dry climates. Ludwig et al. (1997) reported about sloping areas under semiarid conditions in Australia where the landscape is naturally divided into source and sink zones (surface runoff and run-on areas), which are sometimes reclaimed by plant species through retention of water soil and litter.

== Approaches ==
A common approach is the planting of various common horticulturally significant trees, which "are adapted to dry environments...these plants act as windbreaks and the extensive root network binds the soil thus reducing water erosion especially at the beginning of the rainy season when soil cover is at its lowest. Deciduous activity returns large amounts of organic matter to the soil in the form of leaf material which in tum support more vegetation biomass, and hence more soil cover and consequently erosion control. Eventually, ecosystems are reclaimed and desertification controlled." Some of the trees deployed in this way include olive, cashew, date palm, fig, guava, mango, tamarind, pomegranate, papaya, lasoda, and jojoba. Drought-tolerant legumes that provide additional biomass and fix nitrogen include green gram (Phaseolus aureus), black gram (Vigna mungo), chickpea (Cicer arictinum), cowpea (Vigna unguiculata), and lentil (Lens esculenta).

Not only plants can effectively prevent land degradation, but microorganisms are also an effective biological measure to prevent land desertification. Microorganisms can greatly help the artificially cultivated sand control plants to survive in the oasis, thus reducing the waste of resources during recultivation. “Microbial control of land desertification includes organisms such as mosses, lichens, cyanobacteria and slime molds to restore soil nutrients, the use of engineered biocrust‐forming cyanobacteria with these traits (vs. non‐engineered) has the effect of restoring soil fertility. Potential to further increase soil fertility and to reduce soil erosion, thus accelerating the recovery of degraded drylands.”

There are drawbacks to overbuilding oases. Water use in oases is often influenced by plants, climate and human activities. This means that managers not only need to maintain a balance between direct human and natural water use, but also find ways to preserve water near oases. If there is no way to distribute it properly, it will cause serious consequences.
