= Forest City Township =

Forest City Township may refer to the following townships in the United States:

- Forest City Township, Mason County, Illinois
- Forest City Township, Howard County, Iowa
- Forest City Township, Meeker County, Minnesota
