= Desertification =

Process by which fertile areas of land become increasingly arid

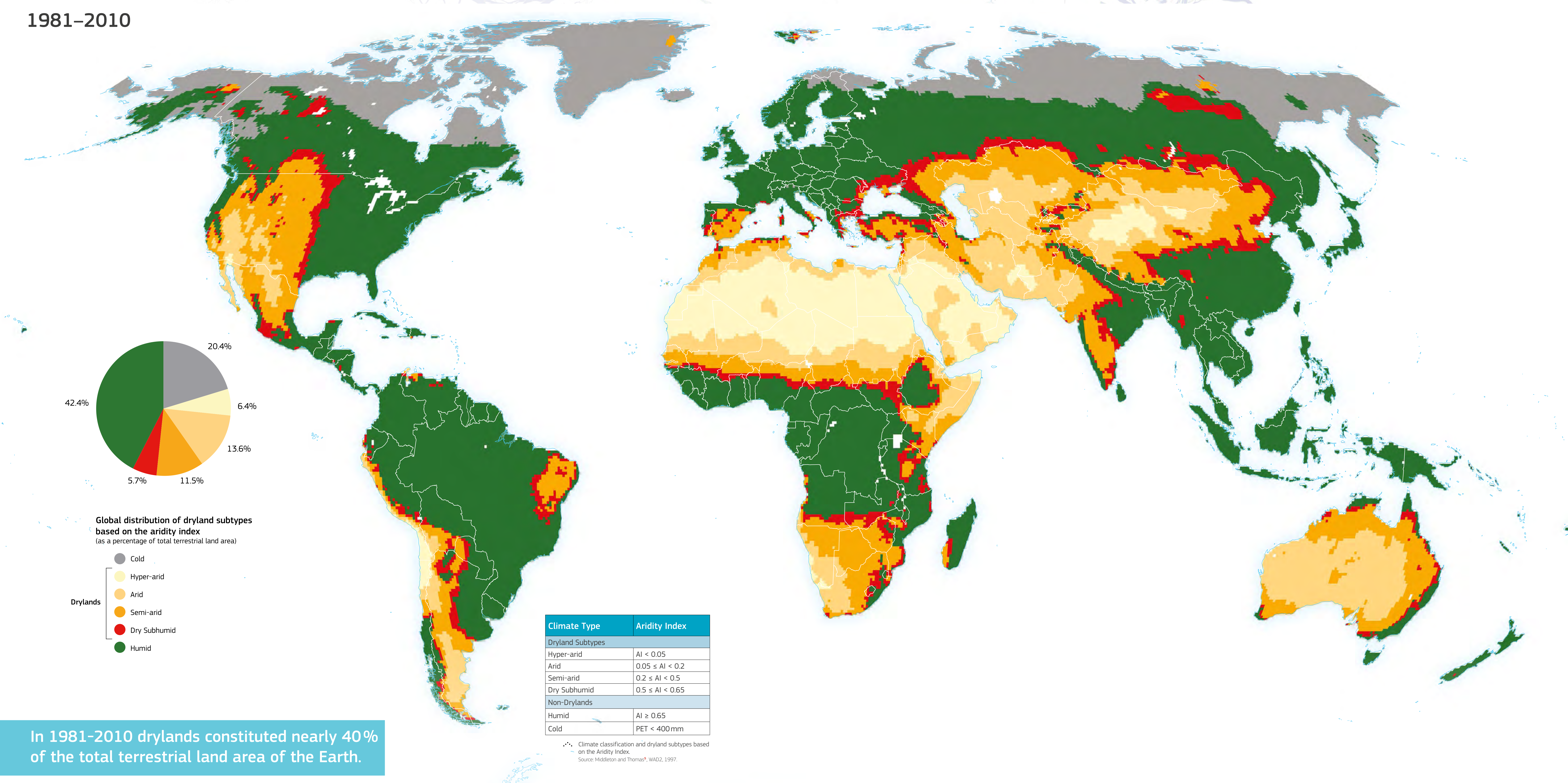
Global distribution of dryland areas based on the aridity index computed over a 30-year average during 1981 to 2010. Typical deserts are indicated by the hyper-arid category (light yellow).

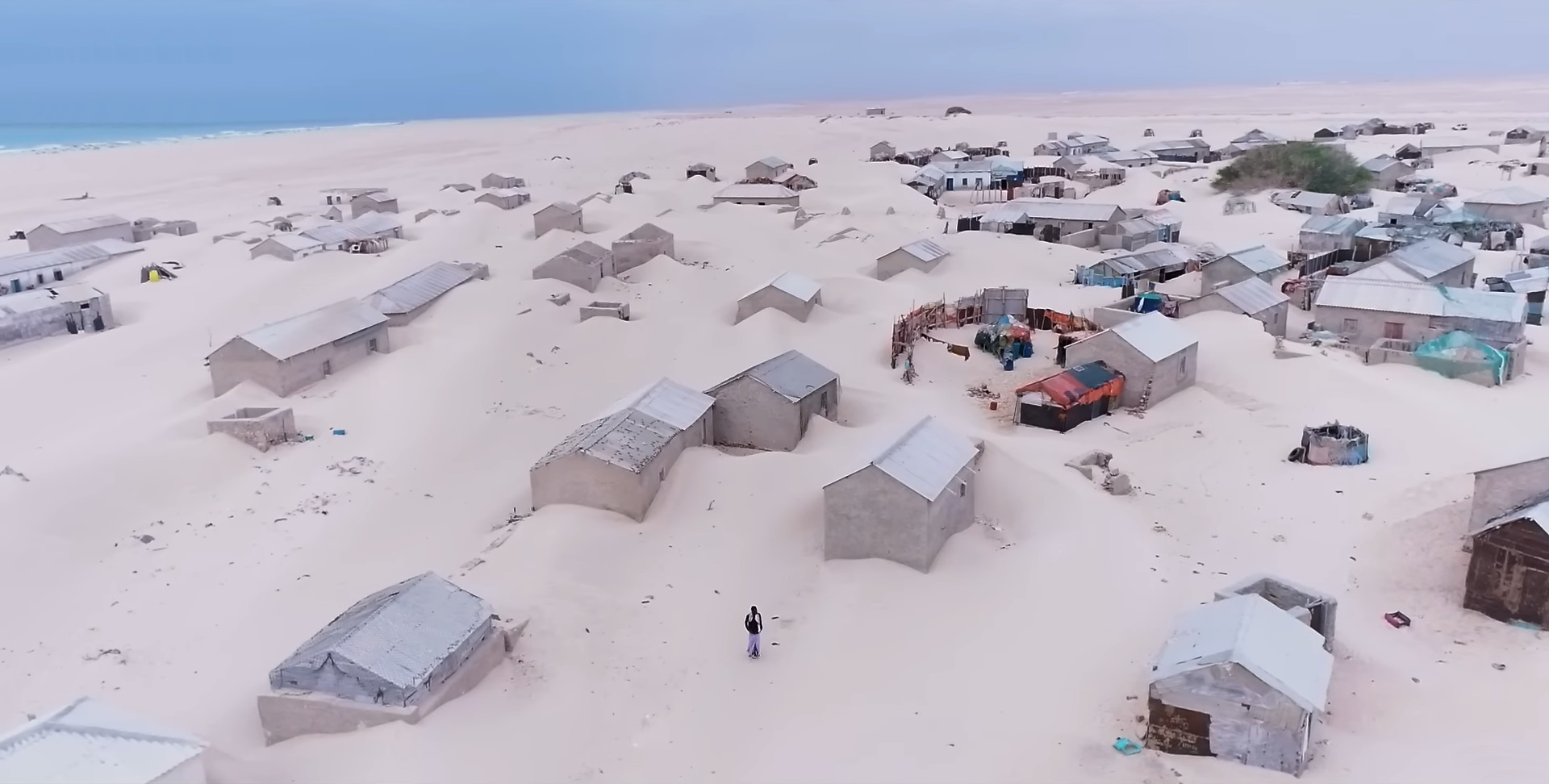
Extreme desertification in Somalia

Desertification is a type of gradual land degradation of fertile land into arid desert due to a combination of natural processes and human activities.

The immediate cause of desertification is the loss of most vegetation. This is driven by a number of factors, alone or in combination, such as drought, climatic shifts, acid rain, tillage for agriculture, overgrazing and deforestation for fuel or construction of materials. Though vegetation plays a major role in determining the biological composition of the soil, studies have shown that, in many environments, the rate of erosion and runoff decreases exponentially with increased vegetation cover. Unprotected, dry soil surfaces blow away with the wind or are washed away by flash floods, leaving infertile lower soil layers that bake in the sun and become an unproductive hardpan.

At least 90% of the inhabitants of drylands live in developing countries, where they also suffer from poor economic and social conditions. This situation is exacerbated by land degradation because of the reduction in productivity, the precariousness of living conditions and the difficulty of access to resources and opportunities.

Geographic areas most affected are located in Africa (Sahel region), Asia (Gobi Desert and Mongolia) and parts of South America. Drylands occupy approximately 40–41% of Earth's land area and are home to more than 2 billion people. Effects of desertification include sand and dust storms, food insecurity, and poverty.

Methods of mitigating or reversing desertification include improving soil quality, greening deserts, managing grazing, and tree-planting (reforestation and afforestation)

Throughout geological history, the development of deserts has occurred naturally over long intervals of time. The modern study of desertification emerged from the study of the 1980s drought in the Sahel.

== Definitions ==
Desertification is a gradual process of increased soil aridity. Desertification has been defined in the text of the United Nations Convention to Combat Desertification (UNCCD) as "land degradation in arid, semi-arid and dry sub-humid regions resulting from various factors, including climatic variations and human activities."

Definition of Desert – That area of the earth where the sum of rain and snowfall is much less than other areas, where the annual average rainfall is less than 25CM. Definition by UNO (1995) – Land degradation in barren, humid and sub-humid areas due to climate change and human activities is called desertification.

As of 2005, considerable controversy existed over the proper definition of the term desertification with more than 100 formal definitions in existence. This definition clearly demonstrated the interconnectedness of desertification and human activities, in particular land use and land management practices. It also highlighted the economic, social and environmental implications of desertification. However, this original understanding that desertification involved the physical expansion of deserts has been rejected as the concept has further evolved since then.

There also exist some controversies around the sub-grouping of types of desertification, including, the validity and usefulness of terms such as "man-made desert" and "non-pattern desert".

== Causes ==
=== Immediate causes ===
The immediate cause of desertification is the loss of most vegetation. This is driven by a number of factors, alone or in combination, such as drought, climatic shifts, tillage for agriculture, overgrazing and deforestation for fuel or construction materials. Though vegetation plays a major role in determining the biological composition of the soil, studies have shown that, in many environments, the rate of erosion and runoff decreases exponentially with increased vegetation cover. Unprotected, dry soil surfaces blow away with the wind or are washed away by flash floods, leaving infertile lower soil layers that bake in the sun and become an unproductive hardpan.

=== Influence of human activities ===
Early studies argued one of the most common causes of desertification was overgrazing, over consumption of vegetation by cattle and other livestock. However, the role of local overexploitation in driving desertification in the recent past is controversial. Drought in the Sahel region is now thought to be principally the result of seasonal variability in rainfall caused by large-scale sea surface temperature variations, largely driven by natural variability and anthropogenic emissions of aerosols (reflective sulphate particles) and greenhouse gases. As a result, changing ocean temperature and reductions in sulfate emissions have caused a re-greening of the region. This has led some scholars to argue that agriculture-induced vegetation loss is a minor factor in desertification.

Human population dynamics have a considerable impact on overgrazing, over-farming and deforestation, as previously acceptable techniques have become unsustainable.

There are multiple reasons farmers use intensive farming as opposed to extensive farming but the main reason is to maximize yields. By increasing productivity, they require a lot more fertilizer, pesticides, and labor to upkeep machinery. This continuous use of the land rapidly depletes the nutrients of the soil causing desertification to spread.

=== Natural variations ===
Scientists agree that the existence of a desert in the place where the Sahara desert is now located is due to natural variations in solar insolation due to orbital precession of the Earth. Such variations influence the strength of the West African Monsoon, inducing feedback in vegetation and dust emission that amplify the cycle of wet and dry Sahara climate. There is also a suggestion the transition of the Sahara from savanna to desert during the mid-Holocene was partially due to overgrazing by the cattle of the local population.

Scientists have further studied critical regions, confirming that human activities and soil health join meteorological factors as main contributors towards desertification. In the Mu Us Desert, soil health makes up 37% of desertification events while meteorological and human activities work to counteract this phenomenon by 46% and 17%, respectively. Inner Mongolia desertification is characterized by 24% meteorological contributions and 34.7% soil benefits throughout this environment. Shaanxi is a counterexample in which meteorological factors work against desertification and soil exacerbates it, demonstrating the various influences of natural factors throughout regions.

=== Climate change ===
Research into desertification is complex, and there is no single metric which can define all aspects. However, more intense climate change is still expected to increase the current extent of drylands on the Earth's continents: from 38% in late 20th century to 50% or 56% by the end of the century, under the "moderate" and high-warming Representative Concentration Pathways 4.5 and 8.5. Most of the expansion will be seen over regions such as "southwest North America, the northern fringe of Africa, southern Africa, and Australia".

Drylands cover 41% of the earth's land surface and include 45% of the world's agricultural land. These regions are among the most vulnerable ecosystems to anthropogenic climate and land use change and are under threat of desertification. An observation-based attribution study of desertification was carried out in 2020 which accounted for climate change, climate variability, CO_{2} fertilization as well as both the gradual and rapid ecosystem changes caused by land use. The study found that, between 1982 and 2015, 6% of the world's drylands underwent desertification driven by unsustainable land use practices compounded by anthropogenic climate change. Despite an average global greening, anthropogenic climate change has degraded 12.6% (5.43 million km^{2}) of drylands, contributing to desertification and affecting 213 million people, 93% of who live in developing economies.

=== Agriculture and farming activities ===
Farming activities such as overgrazing causes desertification. In this farming activity, livestock such as cattle and cows are allowed to feed on a piece of land for a long period of time without planting grasses to replace them. As a result of this, the land becomes bare, exposed to heat from the sun which causes it to harden, heavy wind which also causes the land to lose its nutrients. Overcultivation and Monocropping are other farming activities that causes desertification in Africa. Planting the same crop repeatedly on the same land drains essential nutrients in the land. Once the soil is depleted, it loses its organic matter and the ability to retain moisture, causing the soil harden and crack.

== Effects ==
=== Sand and dust storms ===
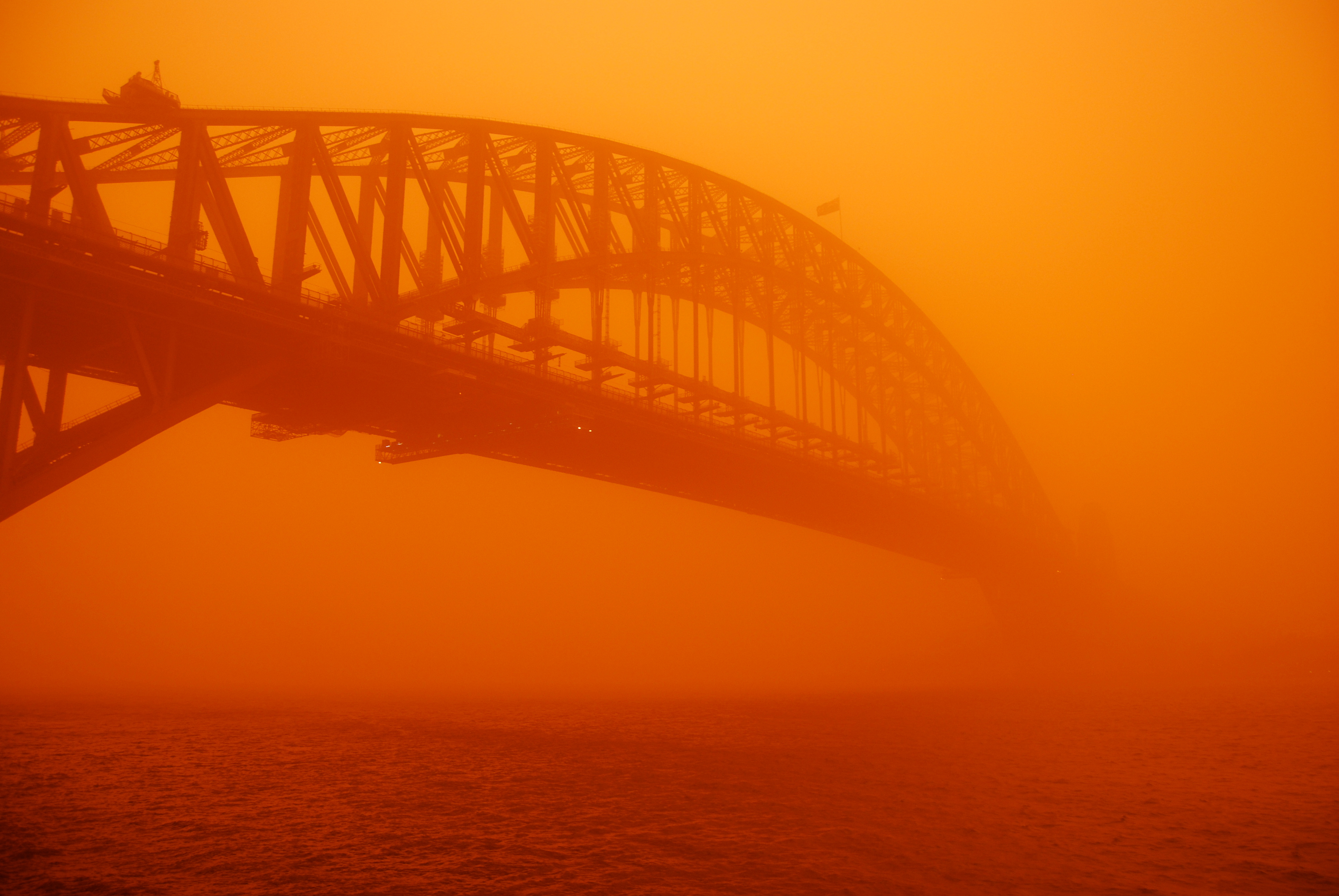
View of Sydney Harbour Bridge covered in dust

There has been a 25% increase in global annual dust emissions between the late nineteenth century to present day. The increase of desertification has also increased the amount of loose sand and dust that the wind can pick up ultimately resulting in a storm. For example, dust storms in the Middle East "are becoming more frequent and intense in recent years" because "long-term reductions in rainfall [cause] lower soil moisture and vegetative cover".

Dust storms can contribute to certain respiratory disorders such as pneumonia, skin irritations, asthma and many more. They can pollute open water, reduce the effectiveness of clean energy efforts, and halt most forms of transportation.

Dust and sand storms can have a negative effect on the climate which can make desertification worse. Dust particles in the air scatter incoming radiation from the sun (Hassan, 2012). The dust can provide momentary coverage for the ground temperature but the atmospheric temperature will increase. This can disform and shorten the lifetime of clouds which can result in less rainfall.

=== Food insecurity ===
Global food security is being threatened by desertification. The more that population grows, the more food that has to be grown. The agricultural business is being displaced from one country to another. For example, Europe on average imports over 50% of its food. Meanwhile, 44% of agricultural land is located in dry lands and it supplies 60% of the world's food production. Desertification is decreasing the amount of sustainable land for agricultural uses but demands are continuously growing. In the near future, the demands will overcome the supply. The violent herder–farmer conflicts in Nigeria, Sudan, Mali and other countries in the Sahel region have been exacerbated by climate change, land degradation and population growth.

=== Increasing poverty ===
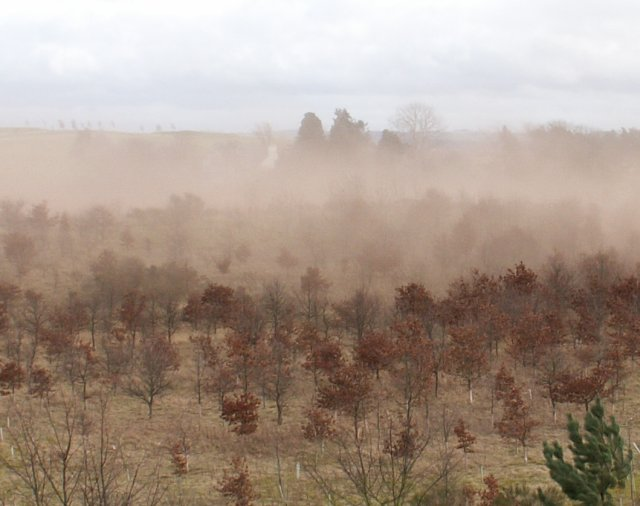
Wind erosion outside Leuchars

At least 90% of the inhabitants of drylands live in developing countries, where they also suffer from poor economic and social conditions. This situation is exacerbated by land degradation because of the reduction in productivity, the precariousness of living conditions and the difficulty of access to resources and opportunities.

Many underdeveloped countries are affected by overgrazing, land exhaustion and overdrafting of groundwater due to pressures to exploit marginal drylands for farming. Decision-makers are understandably averse to invest in arid zones with low potential. This absence of investment contributes to the marginalization of these zones. When unfavorable agri-climatic conditions are combined with an absence of infrastructure and access to markets, as well as poorly adapted production techniques and an underfed and undereducated population, most such zones are excluded from development.

Desertification often causes rural lands to become unable to support the same sized populations that previously lived there. This results in mass migrations out of rural areas and into urban areas particularly in Africa creating unemployment and slums. The number of these environmental refugees grows every year, with projections for sub-Saharan Africa showing a probable increase from 14 million in 2010 to nearly 200 million by 2050. This presents a future crisis for the region, as neighboring nations do not always have the ability to support large populations of refugees.

In Mongolia, the land is 90% fragile dry land, which causes many herders to migrate to the city for work. With very limited resources, the herders that stay on the dry land graze very carefully in order to preserve the land.

Agriculture is one of the main sources of income for many desert communities in Africa. The increase in desertification in these regions has degraded the land to such an extent where people can no longer productively farm and make a profit. This has negatively impacted the economy and increased poverty rates.

There is, however, increased global advocacy e.g. the UN SDG 15 to combat desertification and restore affected lands.

== Geographic areas affected ==
Drylands occupy approximately 40–41% of Earth's land area and are home to more than 2 billion people. It has been estimated that some 10–20% of drylands are already degraded, the total area affected by desertification being between 6 and 12 million square kilometers, that about 1–6% of the inhabitants of drylands live in desertified areas, and that a billion people are under threat from further desertification.

=== Sahel ===
The impact of climate change and human activities on desertification are exemplified in the Sahel region of Africa. The region is characterized by a dry hot climate, high temperatures and low rainfall (100–600 mm per year). So, droughts are the rule in the Sahel region. The Sahel has lost approximately 650,000 km^{2} of its productive agricultural land over the past 50 years; the propagation of desertification in this area is considerable.

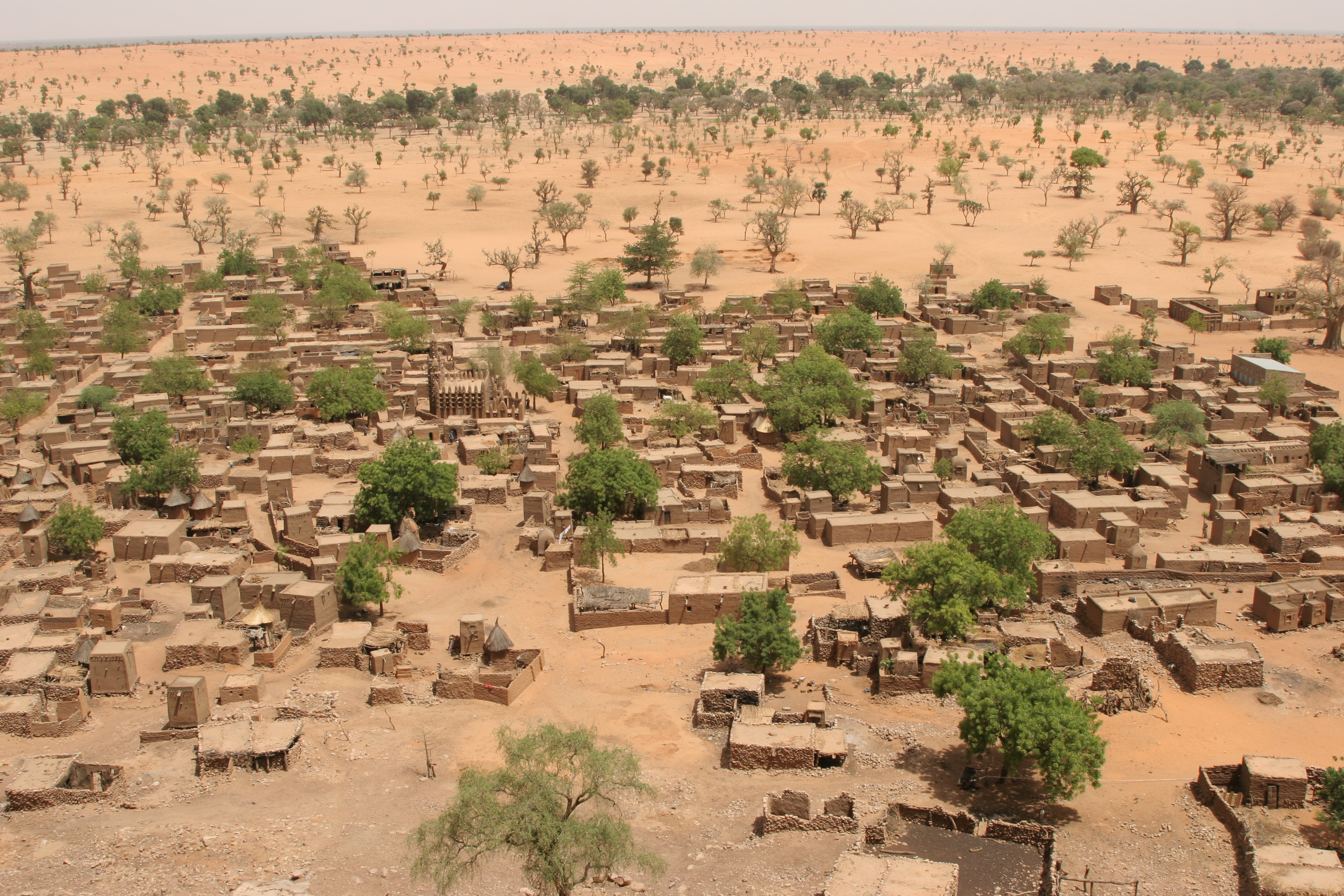
Sahel region of Mali

The climate of the Sahara has undergone enormous variations over the last few hundred thousand years, oscillating between wet (grassland) and dry (desert) every 20,000 years (a phenomenon believed to be caused by long-term changes in the North African climate cycle that alters the path of the North African Monsoon, caused by an approximately 40,000-year cycle in which the axial tilt of the earth changes between 22° and 24.5°). Some statistics have shown that, since 1900, the Sahara has expanded by 250 km to the south over a stretch of land from west to east 6,000 km long.

Lake Chad, located in the Sahel region, has undergone desiccation due to water withdrawal for irrigation and decrease in rainfall. The lake has shrunk by over 90% since 1987, displacing millions of inhabitants. Recent efforts have managed to make some progress toward its restoration, but it is still considered to be at risk of disappearing entirely.

To limit desertification, the Great Green Wall (Africa) initiative was started in 2007 involving the planting of vegetation along a stretch of 7,775 km, 15 km wide, involving 22 countries to 2030. The purpose of this mammoth planting initiative is to enhance retention of water in the ground following the seasonal rainfall, thus promoting land rehabilitation and future agriculture. Senegal has already contributed to the project by planting 50,000 acres of trees. It is said to have improved land quality and caused an increase in economic opportunity in the region.

=== Gobi Desert and Mongolia ===
Another major area that is being impacted by desertification is the Gobi Desert located in Northern China and Southern Mongolia. The Gobi Desert is the fastest expanding desert on Earth, as it transforms over 3,600 square kilometres (1,400 square miles) of grassland into wasteland annually. Although the Gobi Desert itself is still a distance away from Beijing, reports from field studies state there are large sand dunes forming only 70 km (43.5 mi) outside the city.

In Mongolia, around 90% of grassland is considered vulnerable to desertification by the UN. An estimated 13% of desertification in Mongolia is caused by natural factors; the rest is due to human influence particularly overgrazing and increased erosion of soils in cultivated areas. During the period 1940 to 2015, the mean air temperature increased by 2.24 °C. The warmest ten-year period was during the latest decade to 2021. Precipitation has decreased by 7% over this period resulting in increased arid conditions throughout Mongolia. The Gobi desert continues to expand northward, with over 70% of Mongolia's land degraded through overgrazing, deforestation, and climate change. In addition, the Mongolia government has listed forest fires, blights, unsustainable forestry and mining activities as leading causes of desertification in the country. The transition from sheep to goat farming in order to meet export demands for cashmere wool has caused degradation of grazing lands. Compared to sheep, goats do more damage to grazing lands by eating roots and flowers.

To mitigate the financial impact of desertification in Inner Mongolia, Bai Jingying teaches women how to do traditional embroidery, which they then sell to provide additional income.

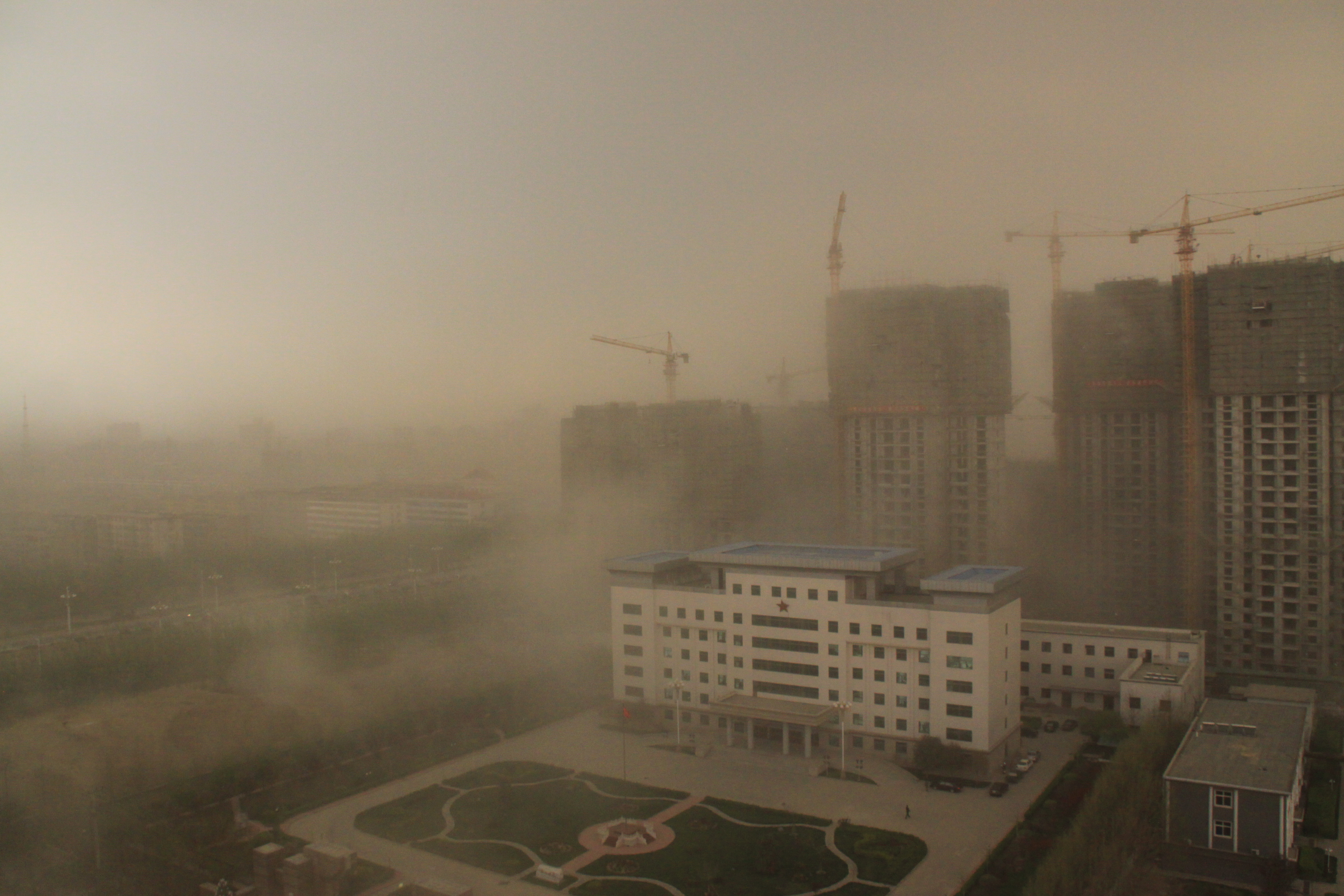
Dust storms in China are linked to severe desertification in its northern and northwestern regions

The Gobi Desert is expanding through desertification, most rapidly on the southern edge into China, which is seeing 3,600 km^{2} (1,390 sq mi) of grassland overtaken every year. Dust storms increased in frequency between 1996 and 2016, causing further damage to China's agriculture economy. However, in some areas desertification has been slowed or reversed.

The northern and eastern boundaries between desert and grassland are constantly changing. This is mostly due to the climate conditions before the growing season, which influence the rate of evapotranspiration and subsequent plant growth.

The expansion of the Gobi is attributed mostly to human activities, locally driven by deforestation, overgrazing, and depletion of water resources, as well as to climate change.

China has tried various plans to slow the expansion of the desert, which have met with some success. The Three-North Shelter Forest Program (or "Green Great Wall") is a Chinese government tree-planting project begun in 1978 and set to continue through 2050. The goal of the program is to reverse desertification by planting aspen and other fast-growing trees on some 36.5 million hectares across some 551 counties in 12 provinces of northern China.

=== South America ===
South America is another area vulnerable by desertification, as 25% of the land is classified as drylands and over 68% of the land area has undergone soil erosion as a result of deforestation and overgrazing. 27 to 43% of the land areas in Bolivia, Chile, Ecuador and Peru are at risk due to desertification. In Argentina, Mexico and Paraguay, greater than half the land area is degraded by desertification and cannot be used for agriculture. In Central America, drought has caused increased unemployment and decreased food security - also causing migration of people. Similar impacts have been seen in rural parts of Mexico where about 1,000 km^{2} of land have been lost yearly due to desertification. In Argentina, desertification has the potential to disrupt the nation's food supply.

== Reversing desertification ==
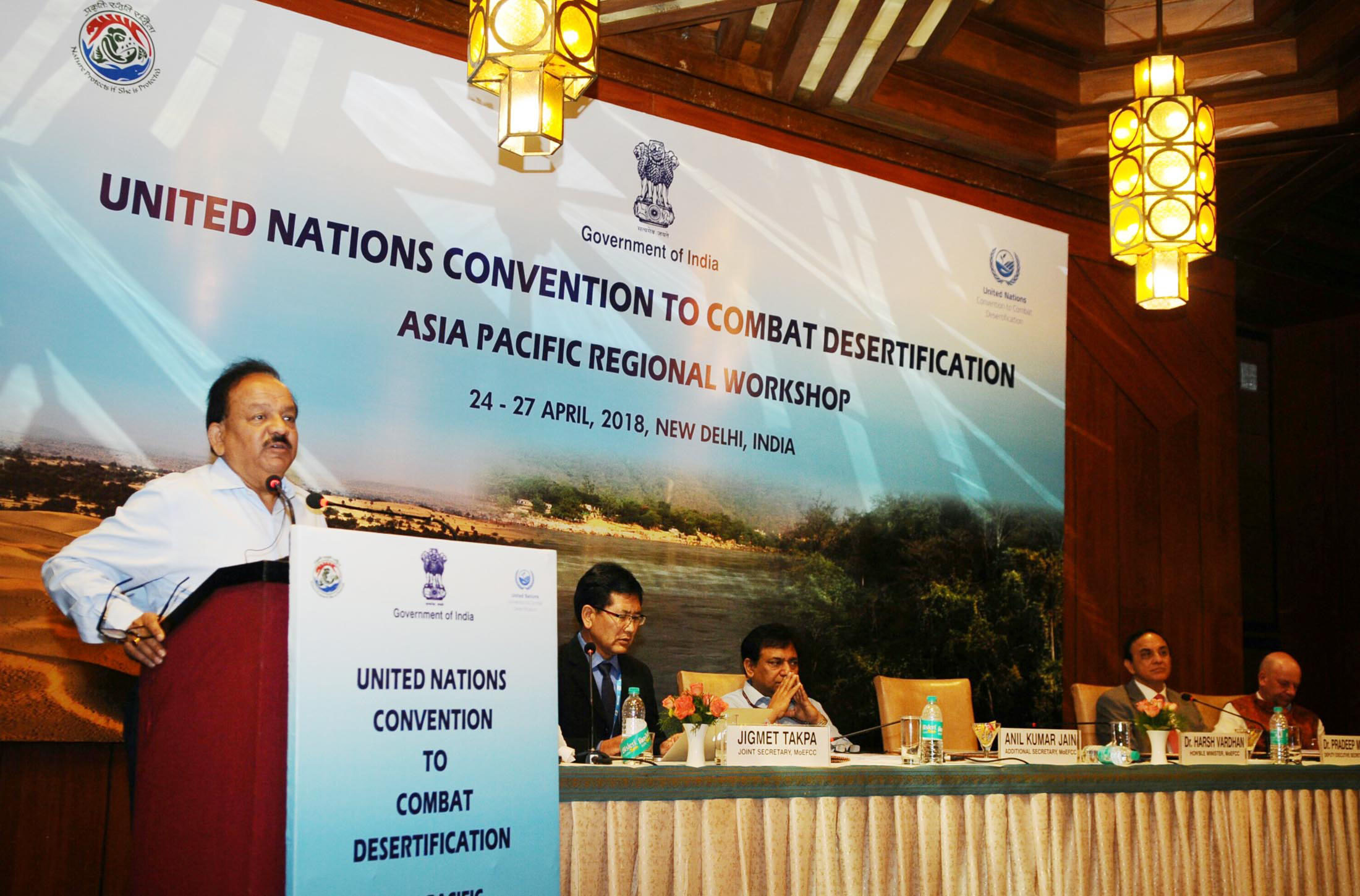
A 2018 meeting in New Delhi related to the United Nations Convention to Combat Desertification

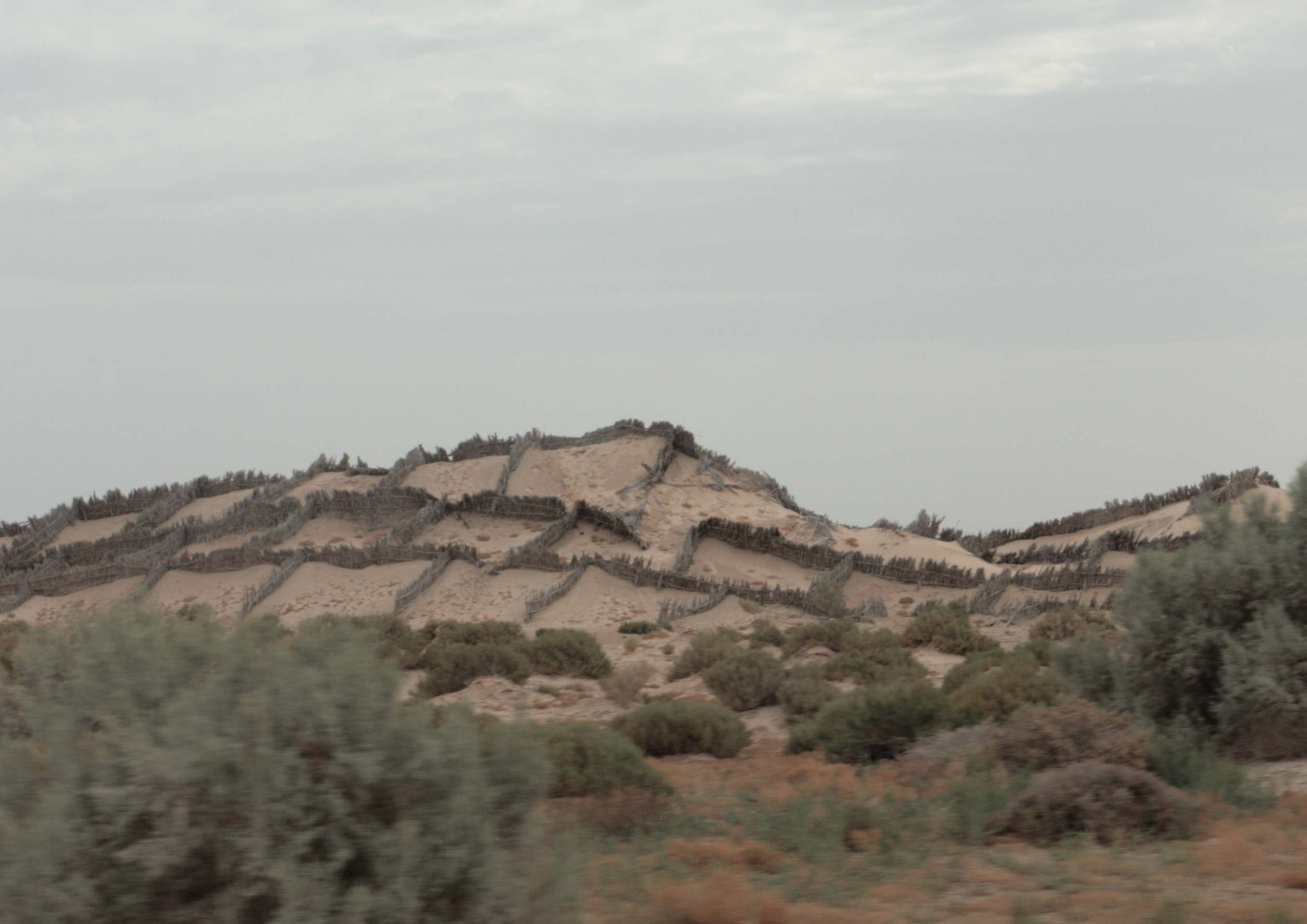
Anti-sand shields in north Sahara, Tunisia

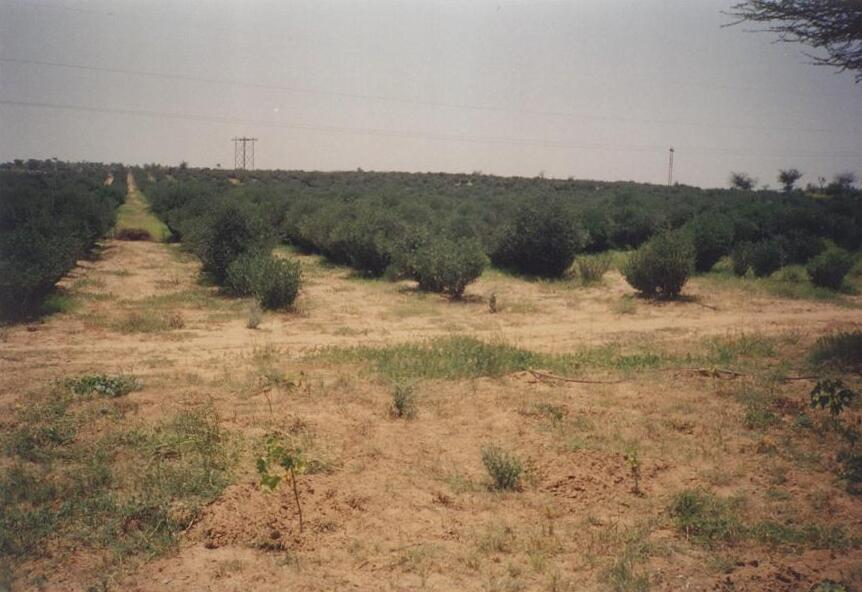
Jojoba plantations, such as those shown, have played a role in combating edge effects of desertification in the Thar Desert, India.

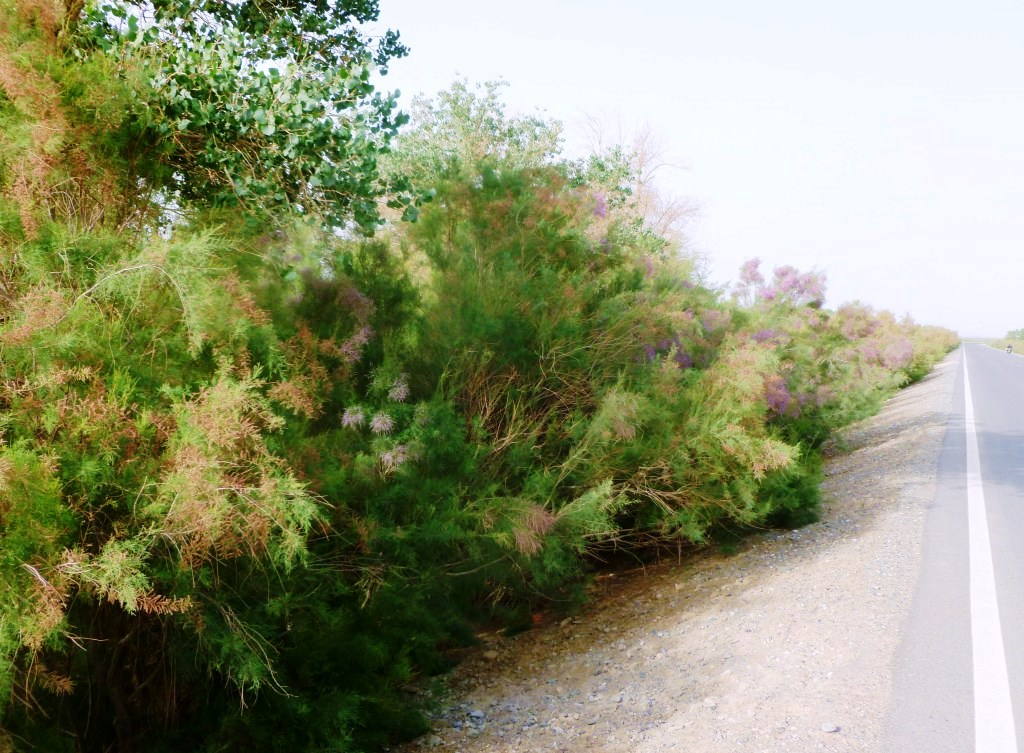
Saxaul planted along roads in Xinjiang near Cherchen to slow desertification

Techniques and countermeasures exist for mitigating or reversing desertification. For some of these measures, there are numerous barriers to their implementation. Yet for others, the solution simply requires the exercise of human reason.

One proposed barrier is that the costs of adopting sustainable agricultural practices sometimes exceed the benefits for individual farmers, even while they are socially and environmentally beneficial. Another issue is a lack of political will, and lack of funding to support land reclamation and anti-desertification programs.

Desertification is recognized as a major threat to biodiversity. Some countries have developed biodiversity action plans to counter its effects, particularly in relation to the protection of endangered flora and fauna.

=== Improving soil quality ===
Techniques focus on two aspects: provisioning of water, and fixation and hyper-fertilizing soil. Fixating the soil is often done through the use of shelter belts, woodlots and windbreaks. Windbreaks are made from trees and bushes and are used to reduce soil erosion and evapotranspiration.

Some soils (for example, clay), due to lack of water can become consolidated rather than porous (as in the case of sandy soils). Some techniques as zaï or tillage are then used to still allow the planting of crops.

Another technique that is useful is contour trenching. This involves the digging of 150 m long, 1 m deep trenches in the soil. The trenches are made parallel to the height lines of the landscape, preventing the water from flowing within the trenches and causing erosion. Stone walls are placed around the trenches to prevent the trenches from closing up again. This method was invented by Peter Westerveld.

Enriching of the soil and restoration of its fertility is often achieved by plants. Of these, leguminous plants which extract nitrogen from the air and fix it in the soil, succulents (such as Opuntia), and food crops/trees as grains, barley, beans and dates are the most important. Sand fences can also be used to control drifting of soil and sand erosion.

Another way to restore soil fertility is through the use of nitrogen-rich fertilizer. Due to the higher cost of this fertilizer, many smallholder farmers are reluctant to use it, especially in areas where subsistence farming is common. Several nations, including India, Zambia, and Malawi have responded to this by implementing subsidies to help encourage adoption of this technique.

Some research centres (such as Bel-Air Research Center IRD/ISRA/UCAD) are also experimenting with the inoculation of tree species with mycorrhiza in arid zones. The mycorrhiza are basically fungi attaching themselves to the roots of the plants. They hereby create a symbiotic relation with the trees, increasing the surface area of the tree's roots greatly (allowing the tree to gather much more nutrient from the soil).

The bioengineering of soil microbes, particularly photosynthesizers, has also been suggested and theoretically modeled as a method to protect drylands. The aim would be to enhance the existing cooperative loops between soil microbes and vegetation.

=== Desert greening ===
As there are many different types of deserts, there are also different types of desert reclamation methodologies. An example for this is the salt flats in the Rub' al Khali desert in Saudi Arabia. These salt flats are one of the most promising desert areas for seawater agriculture and could be revitalized without the use of freshwater or much energy.

Farmer-managed natural regeneration (FMNR) is another technique that has produced successful results for desert reclamation. Since 1980, this method to reforest degraded landscape has been applied with some success in Niger. This simple and low-cost method has enabled farmers to regenerate some 30,000 square kilometers in Niger. The process involves enabling native sprouting tree growth through selective pruning of shrub shoots. The residue from pruned trees can be used to provide mulching for fields thus increasing soil water retention and reducing evaporation. Additionally, properly spaced and pruned trees can increase crop yields. The Humbo Assisted Regeneration Project which uses FMNR techniques in Ethiopia has received money from The World Bank's BioCarbon Fund, which supports projects that sequester or conserve carbon in forests or agricultural ecosystems.

The Food and Agriculture Organization of the United Nations launched the FAO Drylands Restoration Initiative in 2012 to draw together knowledge and experience on dryland restoration. In 2015, FAO published global guidelines for the restoration of degraded forests and landscapes in drylands, in collaboration with the Turkish Ministry of Forestry and Water Affairs and the Turkish Cooperation and Coordination Agency.

The "Green Wall of China" is a high-profile example of one method that has been finding success in this battle with desertification. This wall is a much larger-scale version of what American farmers did in the 1930s to stop the great Midwest dust bowl. This plan was proposed in the late 1970s, and has become a major ecological engineering project that is not predicted to end until the year 2055. According to Chinese reports, there have been nearly 66 billion trees planted in China's great green wall. The green wall of China has decreased desert land in China by an annual average of 1,980 square km. The frequency of sandstorms nationwide have fallen 20% due to the green wall. Due to the success that China has been finding in stopping the spread of desertification, plans are currently being made in Africa to start a "wall" along the borders of the Sahara desert as well to be financed by the United Nations Global Environment Facility trust.

The Great Green Wall, participating countries and Sahel. In September 2020, it was reported that the GGW had covered only 4% of the planned area. In 2024, this number had increased to 30% of the target, and was accelerating.

In 2007 the African Union started the Great Green Wall of Africa project in order to combat desertification in 20 countries. The wall is 8,000 km wide, stretching across the entire width of the continent and has 8 billion dollars in support of the project. The project has restored 36 million hectares of land, and by 2030 the initiative plans to restore a total of 100 million hectares. The Great Green Wall has created many job opportunities for the participating countries, with over 20,000 jobs created in Nigeria alone.

=== Better managed grazing ===
Restored grasslands store CO_{2} from the atmosphere as organic plant material. Grazing livestock, usually not left to wander, consume the grass and minimize its growth. A method proposed to restore grasslands uses fences with many small paddocks, moving herds from one paddock to another after a day or two in order to mimic natural grazers and allowing the grass to grow optimally. Proponents of managed grazing methods claim that increasing this method could increase carbon content of the soils in the world's 3.5 billion hectares of agricultural grassland and offset nearly 12 years of CO_{2} emissions. However, many researchers have contested such claims and stated that it does not reverse desertification nor offset its emissions.

=== Agrivoltaics ===
Researchers in northern China have suggested that strategically placed agrivoltaic systems can support desert ecosystem function, even in low-precipitation areas. A 2025 peer reviewed study published in Scientific Reports reported that microbial count, soil quality and nutrient content had improved "most prominently" under integrated agrivoltaic systems, when compared with non-solar plantings and solar-only installations in the Kubuqui desert, which receives only around 12 inches (~300 mm) of annual rainfall. The researchers attributed these differences to shading from the panels, which reduced soil temperature and limited evaporation, to the panels' windbreaker effects, which prevented sand from burying vegetation, and to the interaction with planted vegetation, which together created a more favourable microclimate than the comparison systems. A 2 GW agrivoltaic project in Inner Mongolia is planned to apply these principles at scale, aiming to combat desertification by restoring vegetation, stabilizing sand dunes, and reducing dust storm intensity and wind speeds.

== History ==
The world's most noted deserts have been formed by natural processes interacting over long intervals of time. During most of these times, deserts have grown and shrunk independently of human activities. Paleodeserts are large sand seas now inactive because they are stabilized by vegetation, some extending beyond the present margins of core deserts, such as the Sahara, the largest hot desert.

Historical evidence shows that the serious and extensive land deterioration occurring several centuries ago in arid regions had three centers: the Mediterranean, the Mesopotamian Valley, and the Loess Plateau of China, where population was dense.

The earliest known discussion of the topic arose soon after the French colonization of West Africa, when the Comité d'Etudes commissioned a study on desséchement progressif to explore the prehistoric expansion of the Sahara Desert. The modern study of desertification emerged from the study of the 1980s drought in the Sahel.

== See also ==
- Aridification
- Oasification
- Deforestation and climate change
- Soil retrogression and degradation
- Water scarcity
- World Day to Combat Desertification and Drought
- Straw checkerboard
