= Liuzhou Forest City =

Liuzhou Forest City 柳州森林城市
- Planned community
- Location of Liuzhou City in Guangxi

- Location in China
- Country: China
- Region: Guangxi

Government
  - Architect: Stefano Boeri
- Time zone: UTC+8 (China Standard)

Liuzhou Forest City (柳州森林城市) Is a sustainable urban forest project in the north of Liuzhou city in Guangxi, China.

== Geography ==
Liuzhou is located on the banks of the Liu River, at an approximate distance of 255 km (158 mi) from Nanning, the regional capital. Liuzhou Forest City will be built to the north of Liuzhou, in the Nanling Mountains.

== History ==
Liujiang man, one of the earliest modern human specimens, was found in this region. It has a continuous history of 2,100 years. Nearby city Liuzhou was founded in 111 B.C., after that it was known as Tanzhong.

China has recorded one of the highest rates of urbanization, with 14 million inhabitants migrating to cities each year. Forest City is a project initiated in China to fight environmental pollution. The masterplan of the city was uploaded by Liuzhou Municipality Urban Planning in 2017. Construction was initially expected to begin in 2020.

== Design ==
The concept of this city started right after the success of Vertical Forest in Milan. Forest City was being developed in an area of 1.75 km^{2} (0.68 sq mi) to host around 30,000 citizens. All the constructions and buildings like offices, houses, hotels, hospitals and schools will be entirely covered by plants and trees to fight atmospheric pollution. The city will host 40,000 trees and almost 1 million plants of 100 different species. This city is planned to absorb around 10,000 tons of CO_{2} and 57 tons of pollutants, and produce about 900 tons of oxygen per year.
