= Dick Potts =

Dr. George Richard Potts (6 December 1939 – 30 March 2017), known as Dick, was an internationally renowned ecologist and conservationist. He was a specialist in the partridge. He is primarily associated with the Game & Wildlife Conservation Trust (then known as the Game Conservation Trust) for which he started many successful conservation projects. He was director of the Game Conservation Trust from 1993 to 2001. He is the author of many scientific papers and some books. The focus of his research for which his most well-known is on the relationship between modern agriculture and game birds and animals.

Potts was awarded the RSPB Medal shortly before his death.

== Biography ==
=== Early years ===
Dick Potts was raised in North Yorkshire on a farm where he learned first hand about the interaction between wildlife and farming. He was particularly affected by the Winter of 1946–47 in the United Kingdom as it killed many birds and other wild animals on his family's farm.

=== Education ===
Potts studied zoology at Durham University. He earned his PhD by studying the European shag on England's Farne Islands.

=== Career: Game Conservation Trust ===
In 1968, Potts joined the Game & Wildlife Conservation Trust (then known as the Game Conservation Trust) as a scientist and began both the Partridge Survival Project and the Sussex Study.

Potts and colleague Paul Vickerman, based on work done in the Sussex Study, published the paper “Studies on the Cereal Ecosystem" in 1974 suggesting that agriculture and wildlife could coexist and should be studied along with pristine wild land.

In 1976, Potts moved to Fordingbridge, taking on the role of Directory of Research for the Game Conservation Trust in 1977. In this role, he extended the research of the Sussex Project to a series of experiments – the first was the Cereal and Gamebirds Project, the second was the Salisbury Plain Experiment.

In 1993, Potts became the director of the Game Conservation Trust. As director, he helped turn Loddington Farm into a demonstration farm. He also championed the Joint Raptor Project.

Potts retired from the Trust in 2001.

=== Retirement ===
In retirement Potts continued to work on Partridge habitat.

== Conservation projects ==
=== Partridge Survival Project ===
The Partridge Survival Project began in April 1968 when Chris Hunt, the founding chairman of the Game & Wildlife Conservation Trust, assigned Dick Potts to explore the effects of pesticides on the grey partridge. Initially, 62 square kilometers of farmland in Sussex, England was used for the project. The project focused on mortality among grey partridge chicks and tracked among other things the populations of various invertebrates that make up the diet of these young birds. In 1974 Dick Potts, together with entomologist Paui Vickerman, published “Studies on the Cereal Ecosystem" based on the work done in the project. The Partridge Survival Project became known as the Sussex Study.

=== Others ===
- Cereal and Gamebirds Project (Conservation headland)
- Salisbury Plain Experiment
- Joint Raptor Project

== Publications ==
- Studies on the Cereal Ecosystem 1974
- The Partridge. Pesticides, Predation and Conservation 1986
