= Dead hedge =

Artificial barrier constructed from foliage

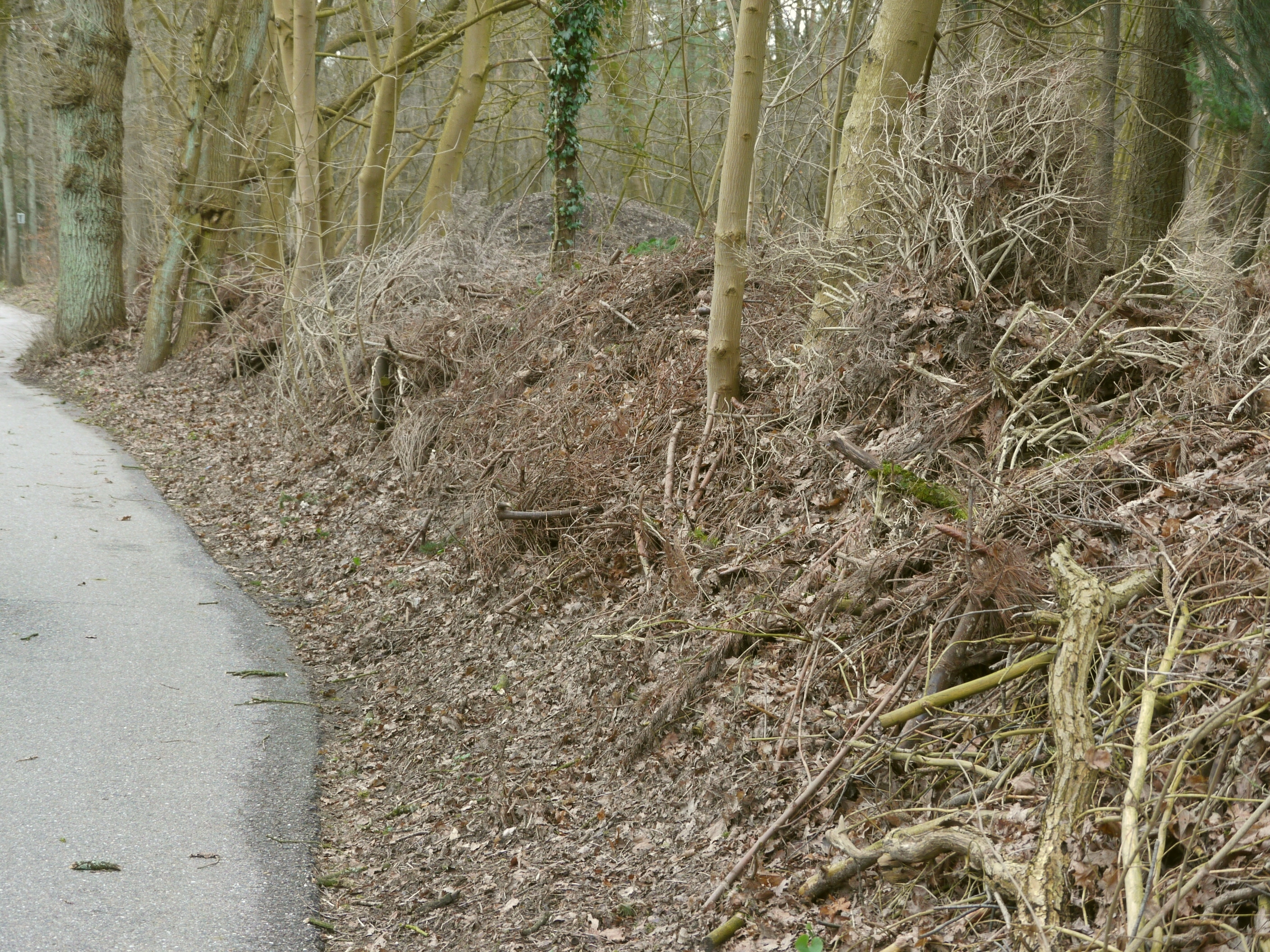
A dead hedge used as a roadside boundary

A dead hedge is a barrier constructed from cut branches, saplings, and foliage. The material can be gathered from activities such as pruning or clearing, and in traditional forms of woodland management, such as coppicing. Its ecological succession can be a beetle bank or hedge.

== Restoration ecology and biological pest control ==
In coppicing, dead hedges are useful for keeping compartments of a coppice tidy, and keeping the public from certain areas. At the same time, they can provide excellent habitats and corridors for wildlife habitat conservation and restoration ecology. They offer habitats for insects such as beetles, and shelter and feeding opportunities for small mammals and birds. Dead hedges can be used to create habitats for natural 'biological control agents' to provide biological pest control. They have roles in the tending of natural landscapes, wildlife gardening, and organic gardening.

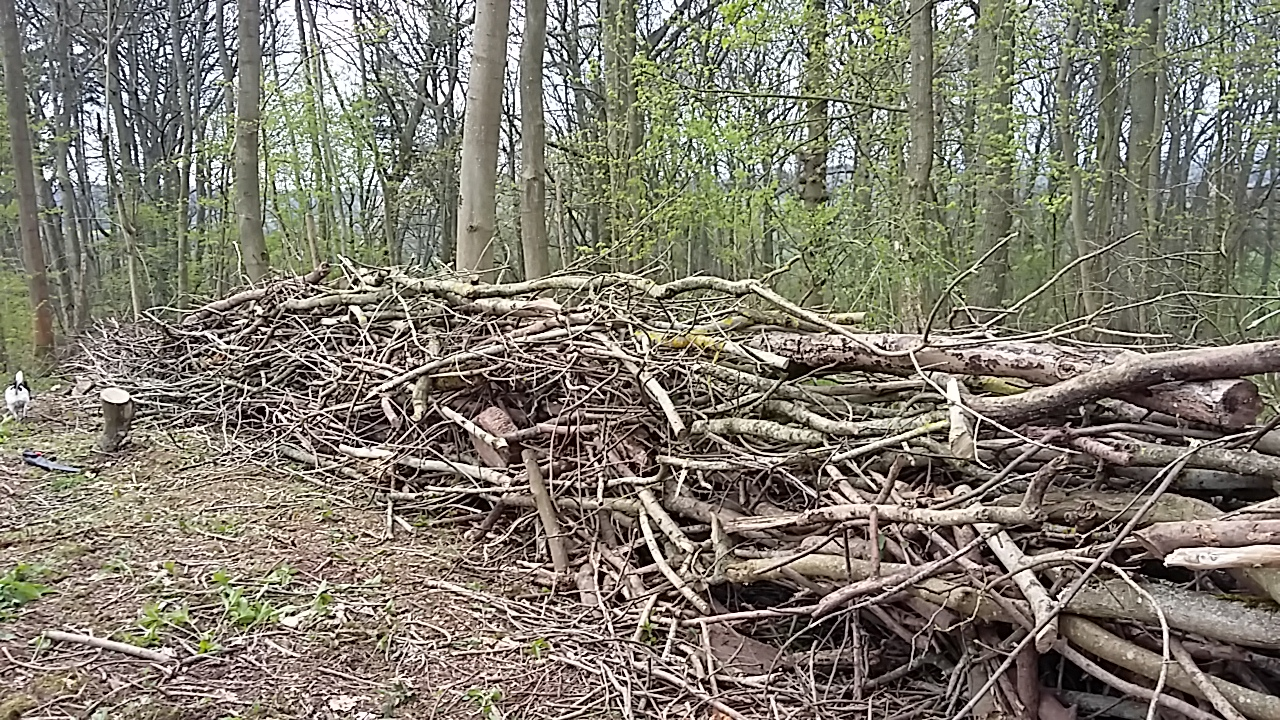
A dead hedge that has been freshly built after coppicing (at Meephill Coppice, Worcestershire, England).

== Agriculture ==
Dead hedges can provide enclosures for livestock. They can also play a role in biological pest control (for example, in organic farming and sustainable agriculture).

Dead hedges provide a carbon-efficient way of recycling biomass, without the need for transport or burning.

== Gallery ==
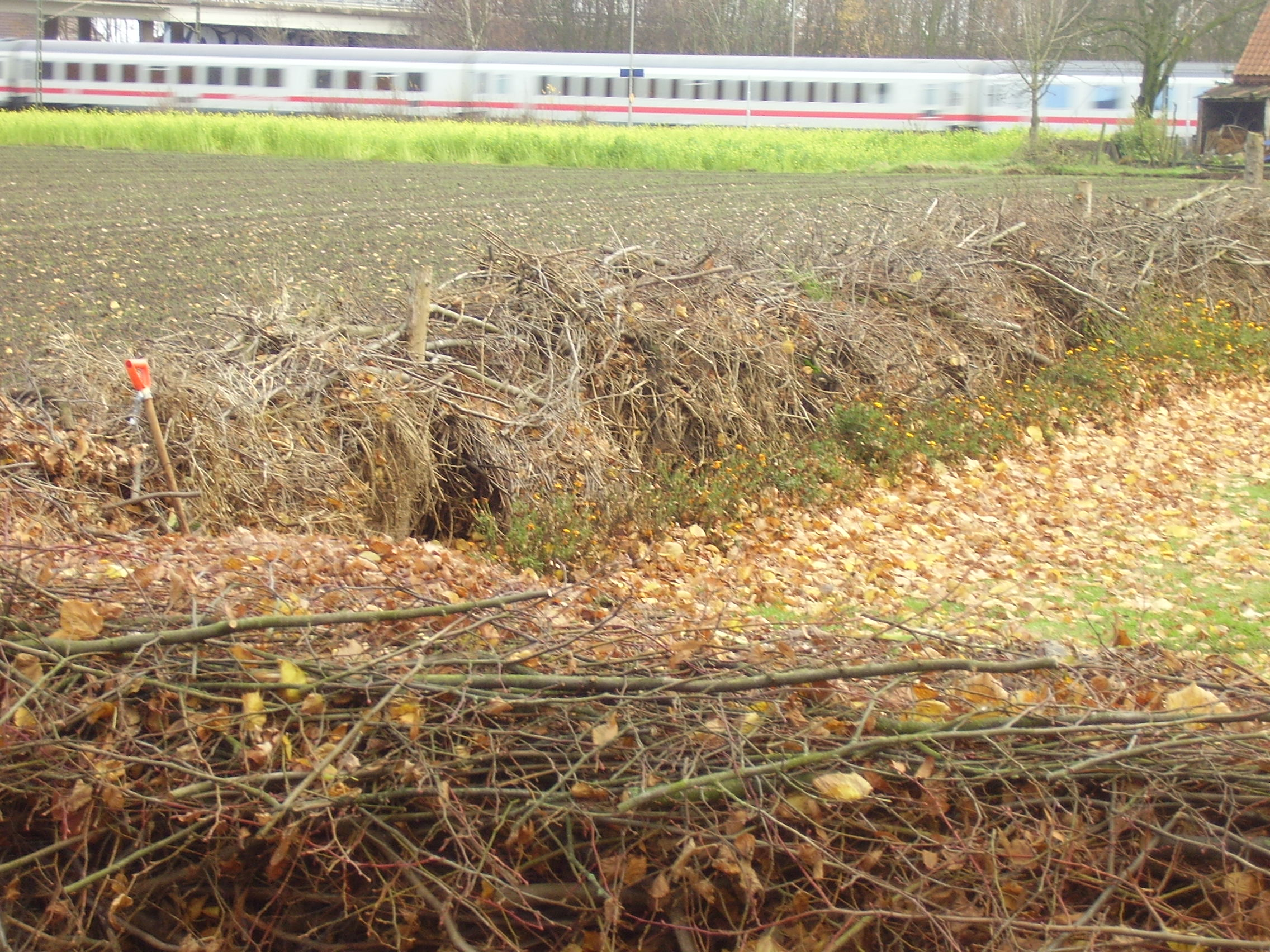
A dead hedge on farmland (at Barrien near Syke, Germany).

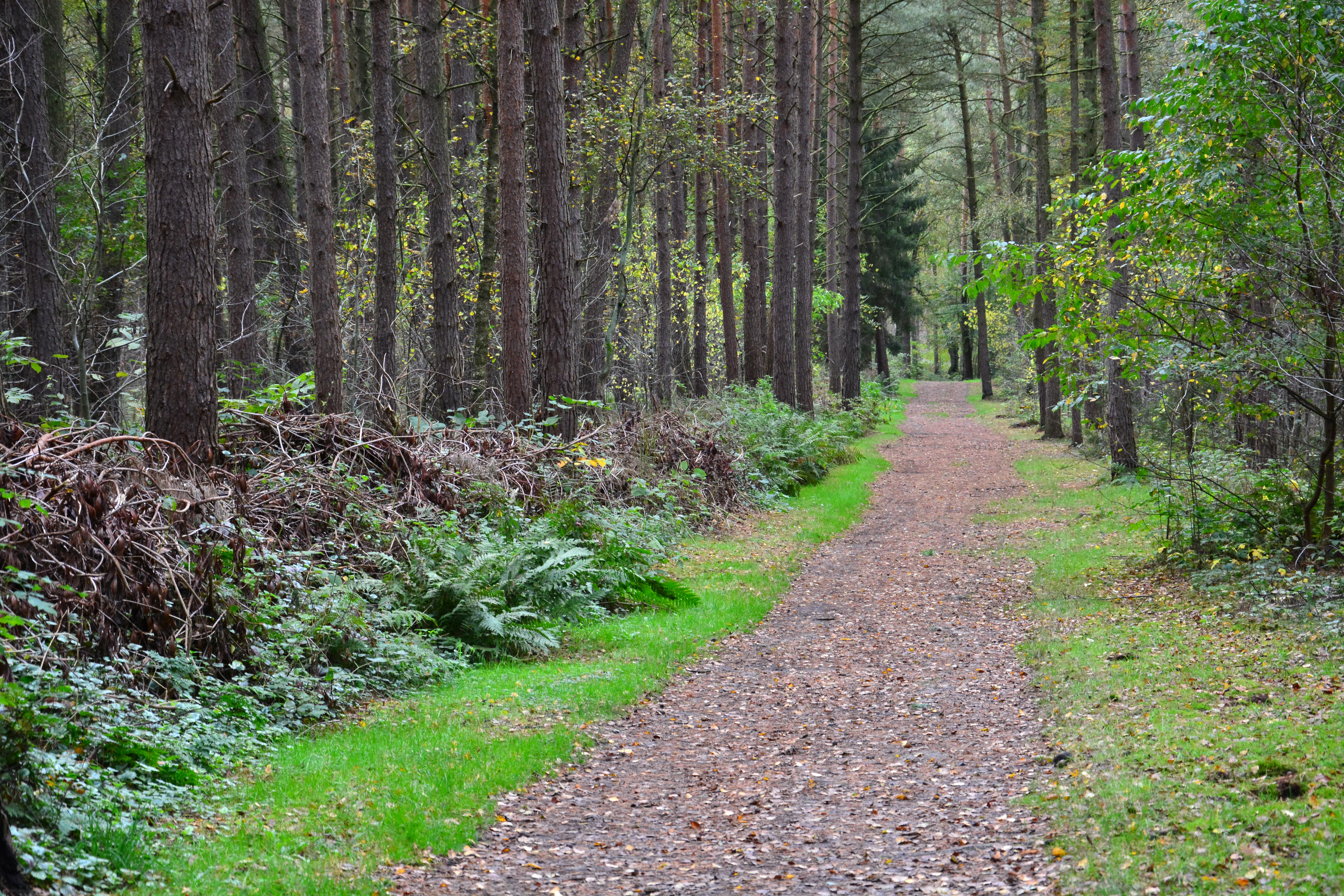
A dead hedge can be seen bordering this forest path in Klövensteen, near Hamburg, Germany.

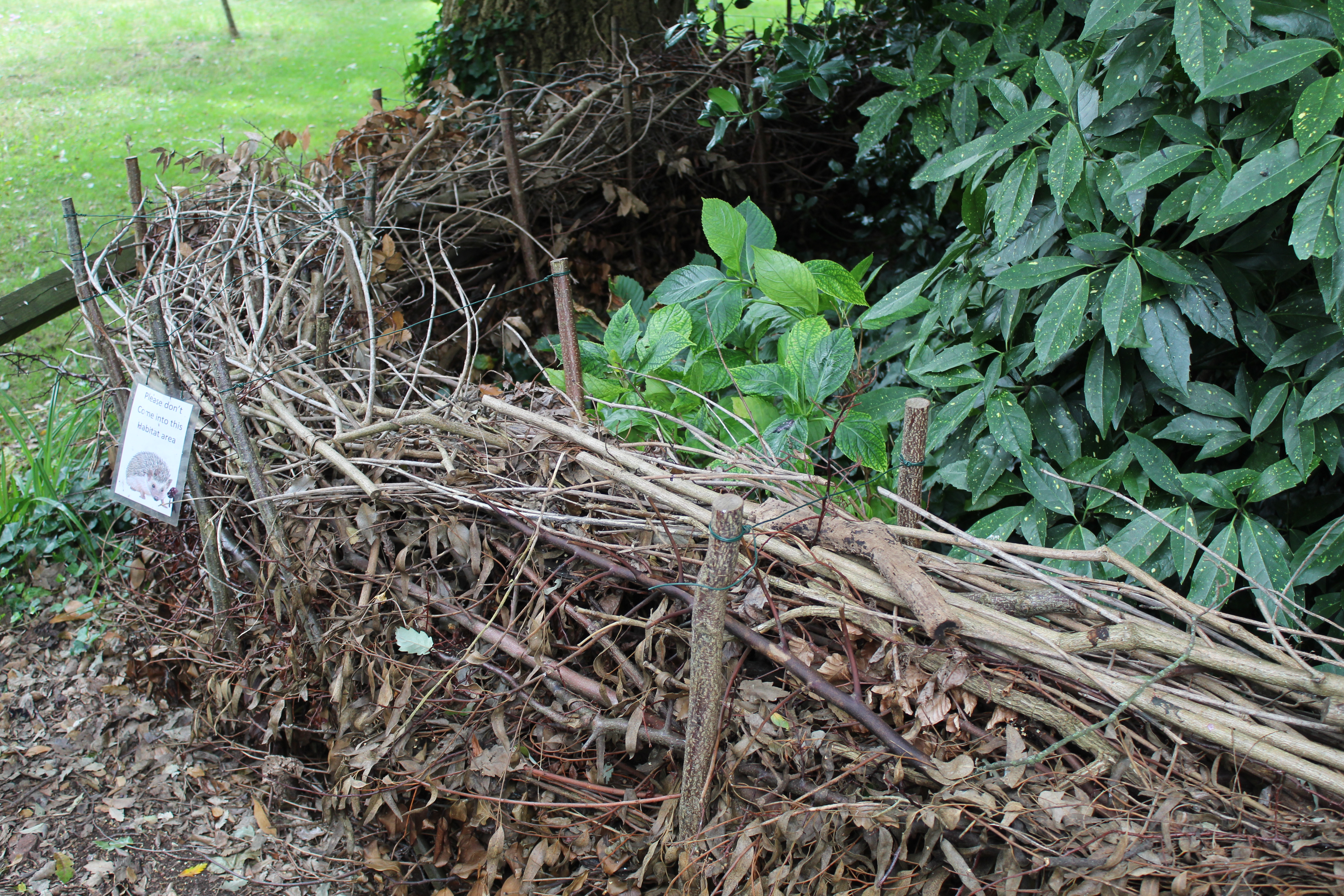
This dead hedge in Royal Fort Gardens, Bristol (England) is being used as a boundary to a protected wildlife habitat.

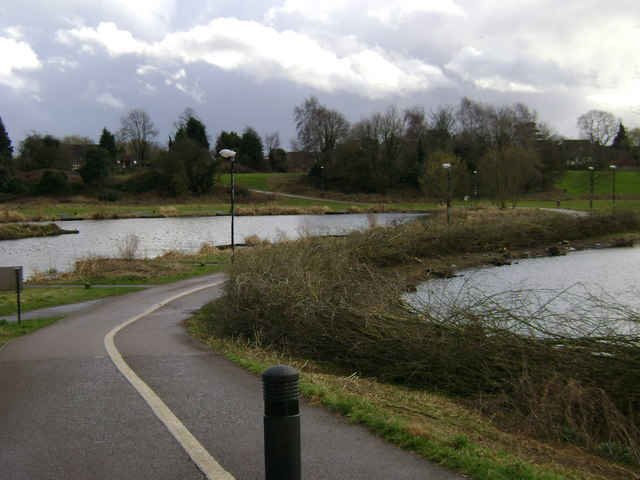
The dead hedge alongside this cycleway is protecting a wildlife pond among the 'Kingfisher Pools' at St Nicholas' Park, Warwick, England.

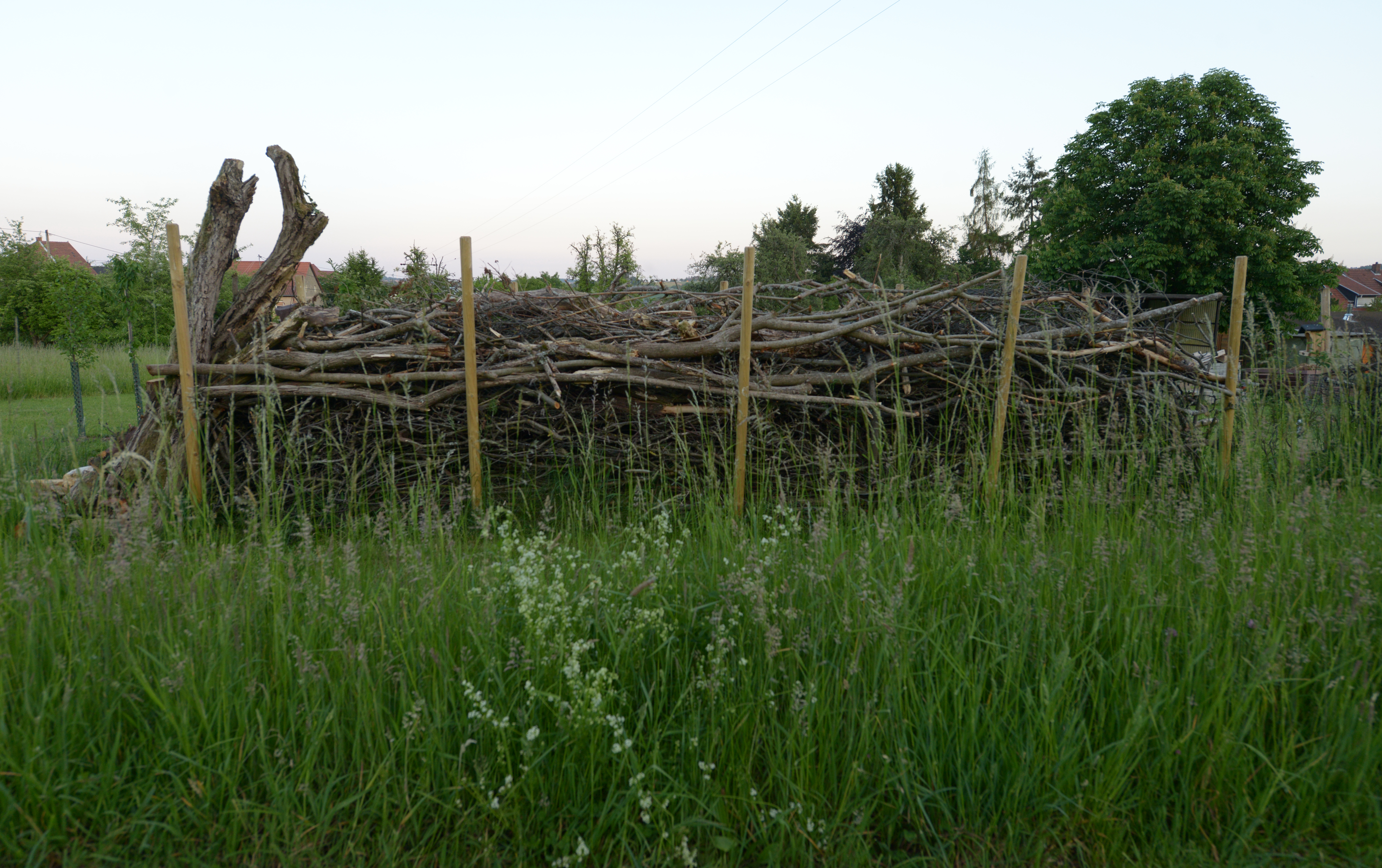
A dead hedge in a private wildlife garden (in Illingen, Saarland, Germany).

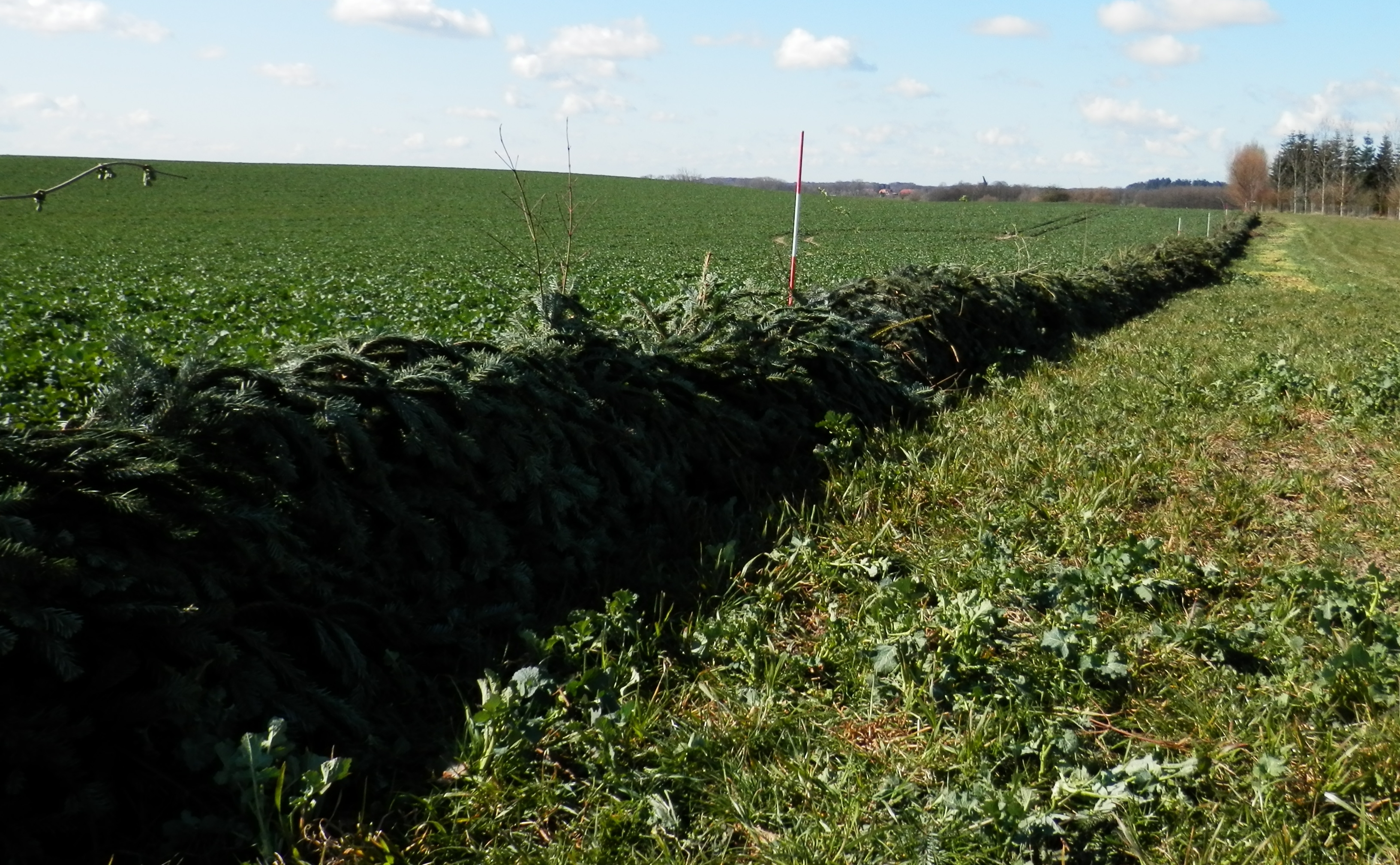
This dead hedge is made from small conifer branches placed around freshly planted saplings (in Hundorf near Schwerin, Germany).

== See also ==
- Beetle bank
- Biodiversity
- Coarse woody debris
- Hedge laying
- Hibernaculum (zoology)
- Insect hotel
- Straw checkerboard
- Windrow (dead hedges may be thought of as "tidy wind-rows")
