= Dobrich Zoo =

Zoo in Bulgaria

Nature and Animal Conservation Centre
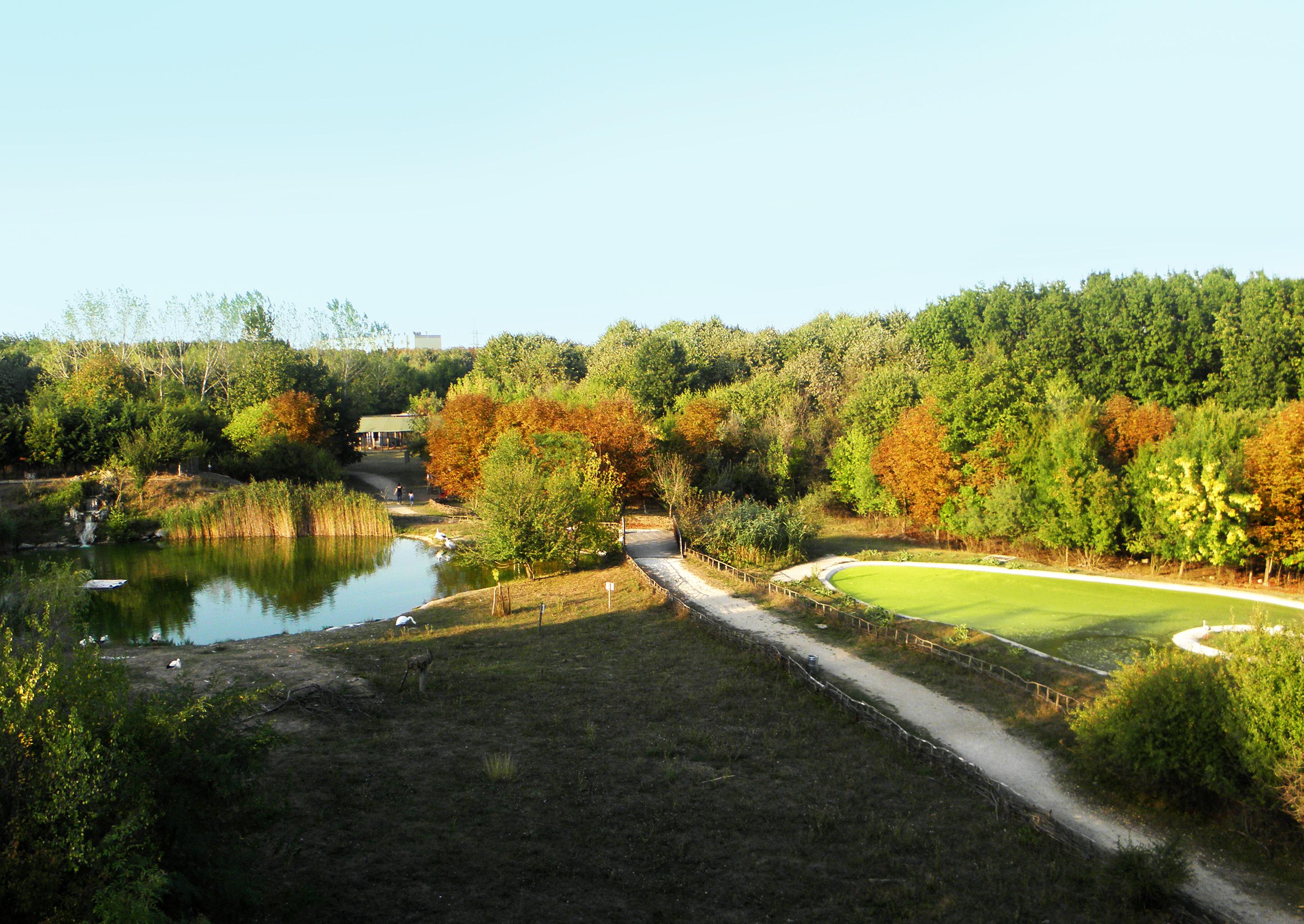
- View from the watching tower
- Interactive map of Nature and Animal Conservation Centre
- 43°33′33″N 27°50′38″E
- Date opened: September 25, 2003
- Location: Dobrich, Bulgaria
- Land area: 16 ha (40 acres)
- No. of animals: 350
- No. of species: 70
- Website: www.zoocentredobrich.com

Zoo Centre Dobrich, also known as the Nature and Animal Conservation Centre, is the first licensed zoo in Bulgaria. It is located in Dobrich, Bulgaria. It houses over 350 animals from 70 species. The Centre was under a Bulgarian-Swiss project in 2003. It has a land area of 16 hectares, 50-year-old vegetation consisted of 35 tree species. The zoo is open from 9:00 to 19:00 (from April to September) and from 10:00 to 16:00 (October to March). The zoo is closed on Mondays.

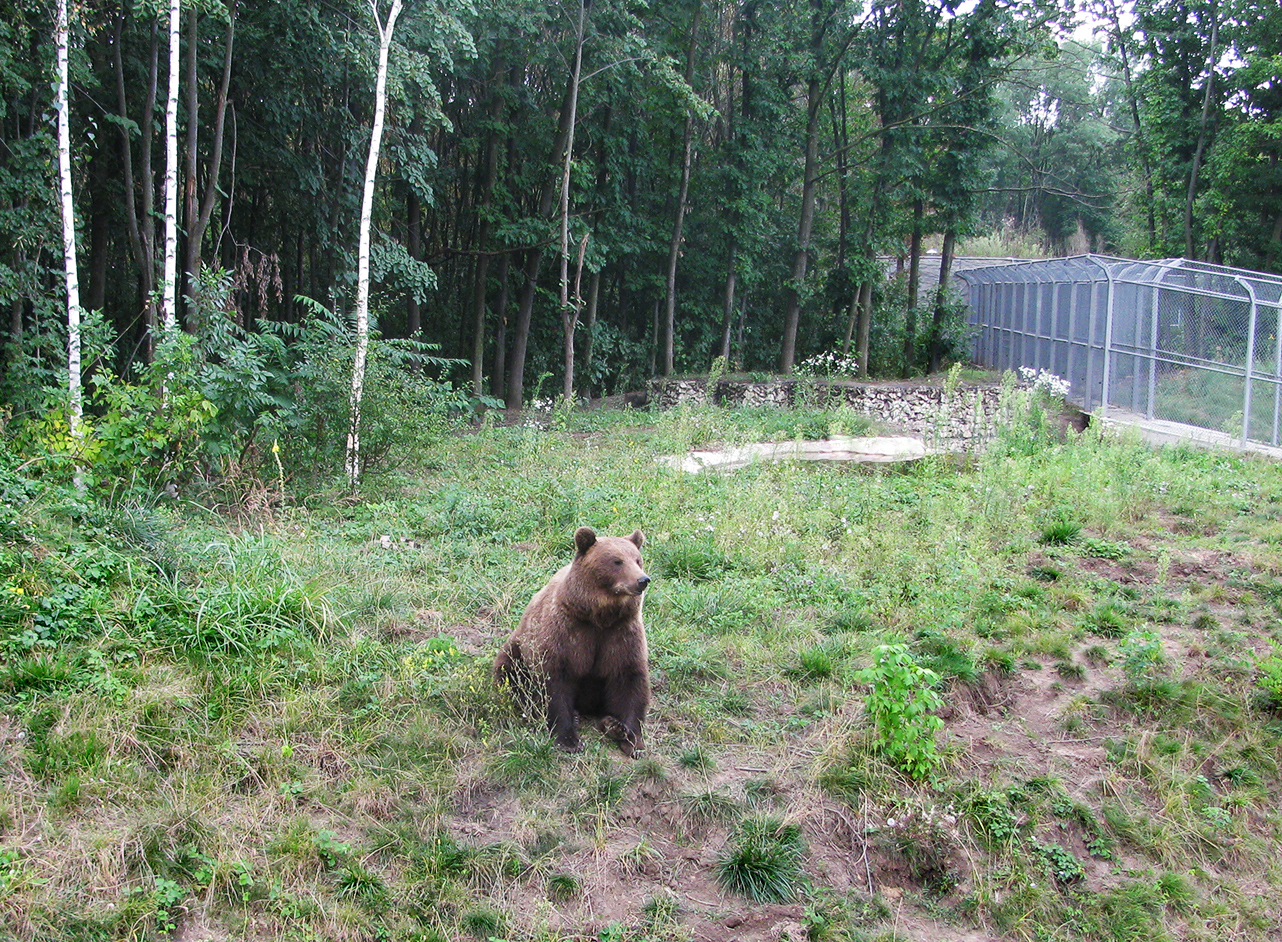
The brown bear Berna

== History and Animals ==
In 1996, Reuters published a photo of a little kangaroo and his mother in their cage in the now closed Dobrich zoo. The publication described the miserable conditions animals were living in. Barbara Gehring, a Swiss ecologist saw the photo and decided to help. She organized charity events and this led to the formation of a Bulgarian-Swiss project which created a new Dobrich zoo in 2003.

There are 40 different species of animals living in the zoo, including roe deer, red deer, red-necked wallabies, raccoons, llamas, alpacas, mouflon, european bison, Przewalski's horse, and two brown bears named Berna and Kostadin.

There are also many species of birds, including eurasian eagle-owls, golden pheasants, peacocks, mute swans, rosy pelicans, white stork, and many fowl species.

The zoo has several ponds, which house red-eared slider turtles. There is also a bug hotel (insect hotel).

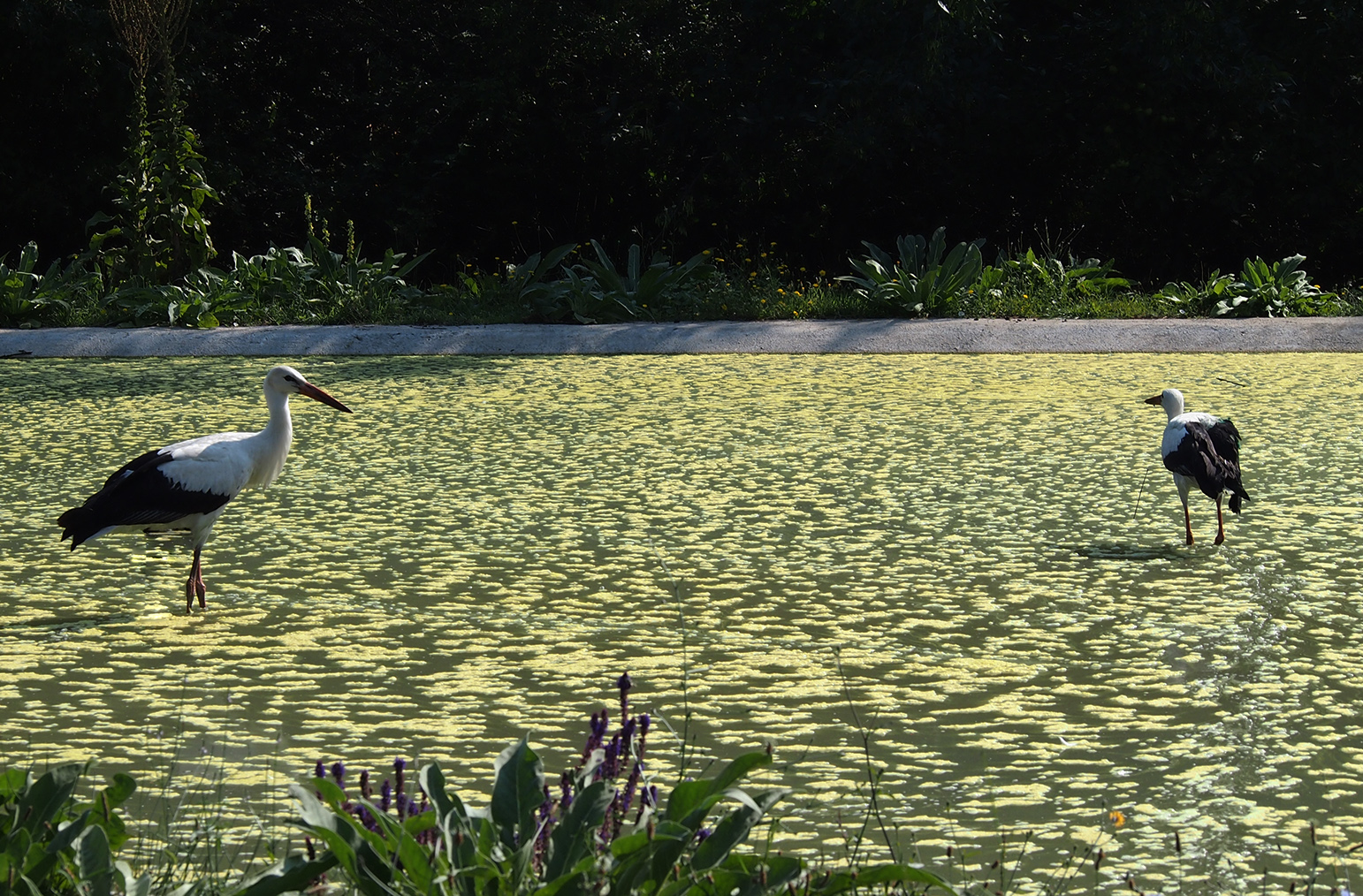
White storks in one of the ponds
