= Bumblebee nest box =

Human-made shelter for bumblebee nesting

A bumblebee nest box (also called a "bumblebee house" or "bombus box") is a specially designed shelter intended for bumblebees (Bombus species) to establish nests. It is used to increase bumblebee populations in gardens, agricultural settings, and conservation areas, and for educational purposes.

== Background ==
Bumblebees often nest underground in abandoned rodent burrows or among dense grasses. However, suitable nest sites can become scarce due to habitat loss and human disturbance. A bumblebee nest box can provide a nest opportunity.

== Design and placement ==
A typical bumblebee nest box is made from untreated wood or durable plastic and includes:

- An internal chamber with nesting material (e.g., dried moss, wood shavings, or kapok)
- A small entrance hole or tube
- Ventilation holes to reduce moisture buildup
- A roof or overhang to protect against rain

Boxes are often placed at or just above ground level in partial shade, near flowering plants to provide easy access to forage. Proper placement and monitoring can improve the chances of occupancy.

== Effectiveness ==
Studies show variable success rates, ranging from below 10% to 30%. Success depends on factors such as box design, correct placement, and local bumblebee species.

== Conservation context ==
In recent decades, bumblebee populations have been declining due to habitat loss, pesticide use, and climate change. Conservation organizations recommend:

- Planting native wildflowers and maintaining diverse forage
- Minimizing pesticide usage
- Preserving undisturbed spaces for overwintering queens

== See also ==
- Bumblebee
- Insect hotel
- Wildlife gardening
- Pollinator decline
- Beehive
