= Conservation headland =

A conservation headland is a strip along the edge of an agricultural field, where pesticides are sprayed only in a selective manner. This increases the number and type of weed and insect species present, and benefits the bird species that depend on them. The grey partridge is one such bird. Conservation headlands were introduced in the 1980s by scientists working for Game & Wildlife Conservation Trust in Great Britain. Trials have taken place in southern Sweden.

- See also: beetle bank
