= Wildflower strip =

Planting scheme

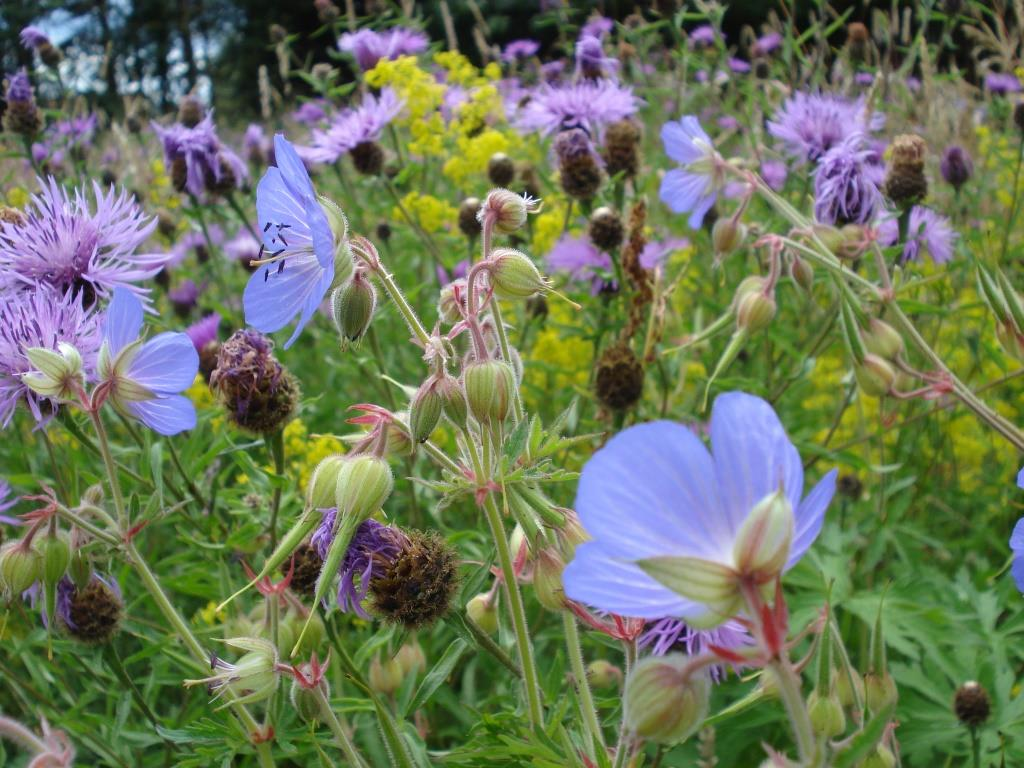
A wildflower strip at Pensthorpe

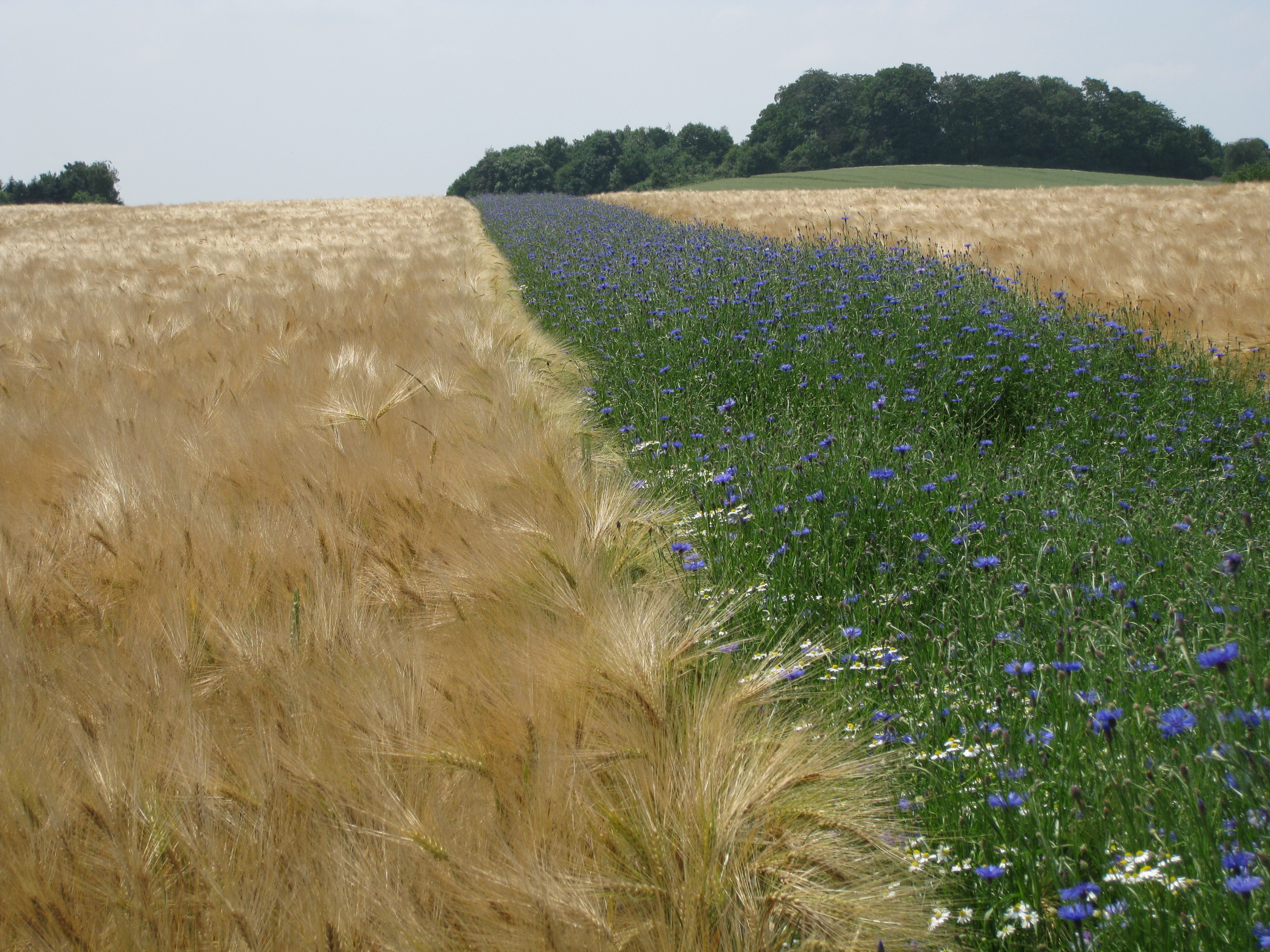
A flowering strip with cornflower dominance between cereal fields as a field trial in Germany.

A wildflower strip is a section of land set aside to grow wildflowers. These can be at the edge of a field to mitigate agricultural intensification and monoculture; along road medians and verges; or in parkland or other open spaces such as the Coronation Meadows. Such strips provide an attractive amenity and can also improve biodiversity, conserving birds, insects and other wildlife.

== General characteristics ==
Wildflower strips are semi-natural habitats made up of mixtures of native herbaceous species. They can be sown on arable field margins to provide multiple ecological, agricultural and conservation benefits. They typically measure 3 – 10 metres in width and vary in their plant species composition depending on their intended purpose.

Wildflower strips can serve various purposes. They can provide nectar sources for pollinators, promote biological pest control, and enhance local biodiversity by improving habitat quality and diversity.

An early concept of wildflower strips was developed in Switzerland in the 1980s. These ideas were described in German as Buntbrachen (wildflower strips) and incorporated into Swiss agricultural policy.

Wildflower strips can naturally regenerate on a variety of soil types. On nutrient-rich soils, the plant community is likely to have low species diversity and be dominated by vigorous grasses. Therefore, lighter soils may be preferable in order to give all species that are present a reasonable chance.

Wildflower strips have been trialled inside fields as an alternative to traditional wildflower strips that border field margins. This approach extends the wildflower strips across the centre of the field. These measures can be seen as an extension to in-field beetle banks and are primarily aimed at making a larger proportion of arable crops easily accessible to the natural enemies of crop pests.

== Ecological benefits and conservation value ==
Not only do wildflower strips add colour and aesthetic appeal to the otherwise homogeneous agricultural landscape, they but also provide food, shelter and overwintering sites for arthropods. These arthropods can play an important role in controlling insect pests of commercial crops. They can also help pollinate crops, as do bumblebees and honeybees, which are attracted to the wildflowers for its source of nectar. Pest-controlling arthropods benefit from the high insulation capacity of the vegetation in the former case, making the wildflower strips suitable as overwintering sites during winter. Wildflower strips can significantly enhance local biodiversity and mitigate declines in economically important invertebrate populations through intensive agriculture. They may be regarded as ecological compensation areas interspersed in a highly disturbed, wildlife-impoverished agroecosystem.

Wildflower strips can also improve habitat connectivity within the agricultural landscape by functioning as wildlife corridors for beneficiary taxa.

== Economic benefits ==
Wildflower strips can benefit agriculture by attracting pollinating insects and arthropods that control pests, potentially improving crop yields. Sowing strips of wildflowers is usually worthwhile if the resulting increase in natural pollination improves crop yields beyond those obtained in the absence of wildflower strips. Creating wildflower strips using inexpensive seed mixtures is an effective way for farmers to promote natural pollination and reduce their reliance on commercially sourced pollinators, such as bumblebees. This also ensures against potential market supply failures.

Restoring semi-natural habitats for pollinators can help offset the loss of pollination services caused by declines in pollinating insects, for example by establishing wildflower strips along field margins.

== Effectiveness ==
While wildflower strips are generally beneficial to wildlife, their success from both ecological and agricultural perspectives depends on several important factors, such as the right plant species composition and the local landscape context within which the strip is established. Ultimately however, choosing the right plant species to sow in the right place depends on the specific conservation goals of the wildflower strip. In an intensive agricultural landscape, for example, it way be best to sow wildflower strips with a mixture of seeds from different species to attract a more taxonomically diverse range of pollinators. Conversely, wildflower strips can be planted with a smaller range of species using a targeted approach to help conserve endangered pollinating insect species. In this case, the seed mixture should primarily contain the preferred host plants of the species in question.

In order to create a viable network of natural or near-natural habitats within the landscape that support wildlife movement, it is important to connect multiple wildflower strips with each other and with wider landscape features. However, it can take several years of vegetation growth and development before the ecological benefits appear.

Wildflower strips should be designed to provide a continuous supply of floral resources for as long as possible throughout the year. This can be achieved by sowing a mixture of annuals, biennials, and perennials at high densities and with differing flowering times. By sowing species with different individual flowering times next to each other, the resulting wildflower strip will be available for use by a range of arthropods for more of the year. This design also benefits insects with long colony cycles such as bumblebees.

Ideal dominant plants within wildflower strips include species in the Fabaceae, which are especially favoured by pollinating bees, or Apiaceae (carrot family), which attract pest-controlling arthropods. It is important to avoid choosing dominant species that are sensitive to herbivory by slugs and snails, such as Centaurea cyanus or Papaver rhoeas, since this can affect the growth and development of the wildflower strip.

Another consideration is the economic practicality of planting and maintaining wildflower strips. Farmers will need to invest in the initial seed mixture for sowing and account for the ongoing maintenance costs to prevent the spread of vigorous grass species and other perennial weeds.

The larva of target species may benefit from the selective sowing of food plants in wildflower strips, which can help to achieve conservation goals. However, this aspect is often overlooked when designing agri-environment schemes.

== See also ==
- Beetle bank
- Buffer strip
- Median strip
- Native species
- Riparian buffer
- Road verge
- Wildlife corridor
- Windbreak
