= Schnaakenmoor =

Coordinates: 53.6008°N 9.7606°E

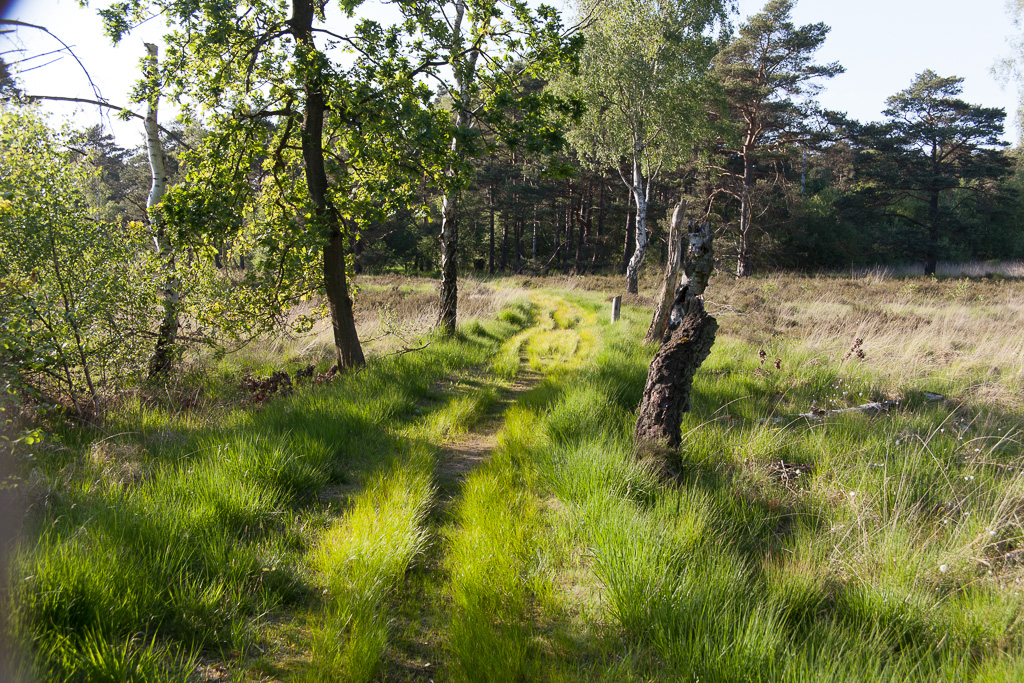
Schnaakenmoor nature reserve

The Schnaakenmoor is a nature reserve area located in the northwest of the forest district Klövensteen in Hamburg, Germany. The Klövensteen is a forest district and a recreational area in the west of Hamburg. Schnaakenmoor covers also some areas from the Grotenmoor, the Spitzendorfer Moorflagen, Babenbischenweg and Feldweg 83.

The Schnaakenmoor emerged through the last ice age, some 10,000 years ago. It developed from a long sand dune, which roughly covered an area reaching from Elmshorn to Glückstadt. Nowadays the Schnaakenmoor consists mainly of bog moss, which make a basis of about 1 metre bogmoss layer.

Plant researcher and other biologists find a lot of rare plant and animal species in the Schnaakenmoor. For example, a variety of different landscapes are to be found in this small area. Examples are inland dunes, hill moors, buckwheat or meadows. Animal species are e.g. warty newt, moor frog, large marsh grasshopper and crossed adder.

In the year 2006 the area of Schnaakenmoor was enlarged about 100 hectares. Some measures have since been taken to maintain the Schnaakenmoor, so parts were cut from pine forests to meet its needs. The Schnaakenmoor serves alongside research also as a nearby recreational area, as well as the Klövensteen whole.
