= Game & Wildlife Conservation Trust =

British charitable organisation

- Formation: 1931; 95 years ago
- Type: Conservation charity
- Headquarters: Burgate Manor, Fordingbridge, Hampshire
- Region served: United Kingdom
- Patron: King Charles III
- President: Robert Gascoyne-Cecil, 7th Marquess of Salisbury
- Key people: Teresa Dent (Chief Executive)
- Revenue: £9.34 million GBP (2021)
- Employees: 102 staff
- Website: www.gwct.org.uk

The Game & Wildlife Conservation Trust (formerly the Game Conservancy Trust) is a British charitable organisation using science to promote game and wildlife management as an essential part of nature conservation. For over 80 years the Trust has been conducting scientific research to understand why there have been declines in species such as the grey partridge, black grouse, water vole, corn bunting and brown hare.

The Trust advises conservationists, farmers and land managers on ways to improve wildlife habitat and enhance the countryside for public benefit. It also lobbies government for agricultural and conservation policies based on science.

Notable conservation projects of the Trust are those conserving grey partridges, black grouse and regarding control of mink where they are preying on water voles.

In 2004, the Trust won the first UFAW Wild Animal Welfare Award from the Universities Federation for Animal Welfare for its innovative low-cost ‘Mink Raft’, which enabled the efficient monitoring and capture of mink while minimising the risks to non-target species for water vole conservation. These rafts are now used extensively across the UK.

== Charitable Objectives ==
The Trust's charitable objectives are stated as:

- To promote for the public benefit the conservation of game and its associated flora and fauna.
- To conduct research into game and wildlife management (including the use of game animals as a natural resource) and the effects of farming and other land management practices on the environment, and to publish the useful results of such research.
- To advance the education of the public and those managing the countryside in the effects of farming and management of the land which is sympathetic to game and wildlife.
- To conserve game and wildlife for public benefit including: where it is for the protection of the environment, the conservation or promotion of biological diversity through the provision, conservation, restoration or enhancement of the natural habitat; or the maintenance or recovery of a species in its natural habitat on land or in water and in particular where the natural habitat is situated in the vicinity of a landfill site.

== History ==
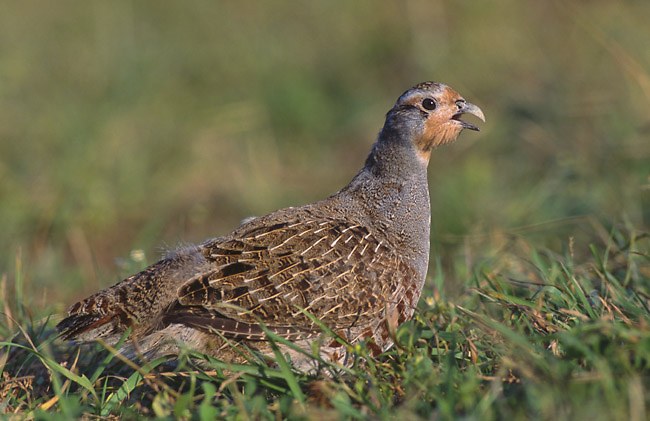
The Trust is the leading authority on the conservation of the grey partridge

A severe outbreak of the disease strongylosis in grey partridges in 1931 led Major HG Eley (a shotgun cartridge manufacturer) to establish the ICI Game Research Station at Knebworth in Hertfordshire. The organisation began investigating partridge biology and monitoring their numbers on farms and estates across the UK in 1933 - work that continues to this day with the participation of farmers, land managers and gamekeepers in its Partridge Count Scheme.

After World War II, Eley established a new base at Burgate Manor in Fordingbridge, Hampshire, forming what was later known as the Eley Game Advisory Service. They leased a local 4,000-acre (16 km^{2}) estate and for 14 years ran it as a demonstration and experimental game shoot.

Much of the association's early work was on the effects of organochlorine pesticides The results of this work helped to bring in a ban on the use of dieldrin, aldrin and heptachlor seed dressings in 1962.

In March 2009, due to Government funding cuts to the Centre for Ecology & Hydrology, the Trust took over the running of the East Stoke Salmon & Trout Research Centre in Dorset, as well as the three research staff being made redundant, in order to secure the continuation of the Centre's expertise and internationally important long-term data collection.

=== Name and organisational changes ===
In 1969, following the withdrawal of financial assistance from ICI, and thus ending its nearly 40-year association with Eley Cartridges, it became the Game Conservancy.

In April 1980, it was registered as a research and education charity under the name - Game Conservancy Trust.

On 1 October 2007, after 27 years as the Game Conservancy Trust, the organisation was renamed to the Game & Wildlife Conservation Trust, to better reflect it's broader work of also conserving "associated flora and fauna", which can also benefit as a consequence of sympathetic game management and accompanying land management practices.

== Conservation ==
The Game & Wildlife Conservation Trust works on the following species and habitats:

- Grey partridge
- Black grouse
- Red grouse
- Capercaillie
- Ptarmigan
- Eurasian woodcock
- Brown hare
- Atlantic salmon
- Brown trout
- Farmland birds such as yellowhammer, song thrush and corn bunting
- Chalk streams
- Farmland
- Field margins
- Heather moorland

The Trust is one of the pioneers in research into conservation headlands and beetle banks.

== Research ==
The Trust has conducted and published research on countryside and game management, on topics such as numbers of gamebirds, disease in gamebirds, predator control and farming practices. It also publishes peer-reviewed papers in scientific journals.

The Trust has been studying insect and invertebrate abundance in an area of the Sussex Downs – 32 square kilometres of farmland used mainly for cereal crops. This Sussex Study has been running for over 50 years since it started in 1970 and so is the world's longest-running study of cereal ecosystems. The study reports that, in the period 1970 to 2019, there was an overall decline of 37% in invertebrate abundance.

== See also ==
- Hunting in the United Kingdom
- Game (food)
- British Association for Shooting and Conservation
- Decline in insect populations
