= Klövensteen =

Forest in Hamburg and Schleswig-Holstein, Germany

Coordinates: 53.5964°N 9.7463°E

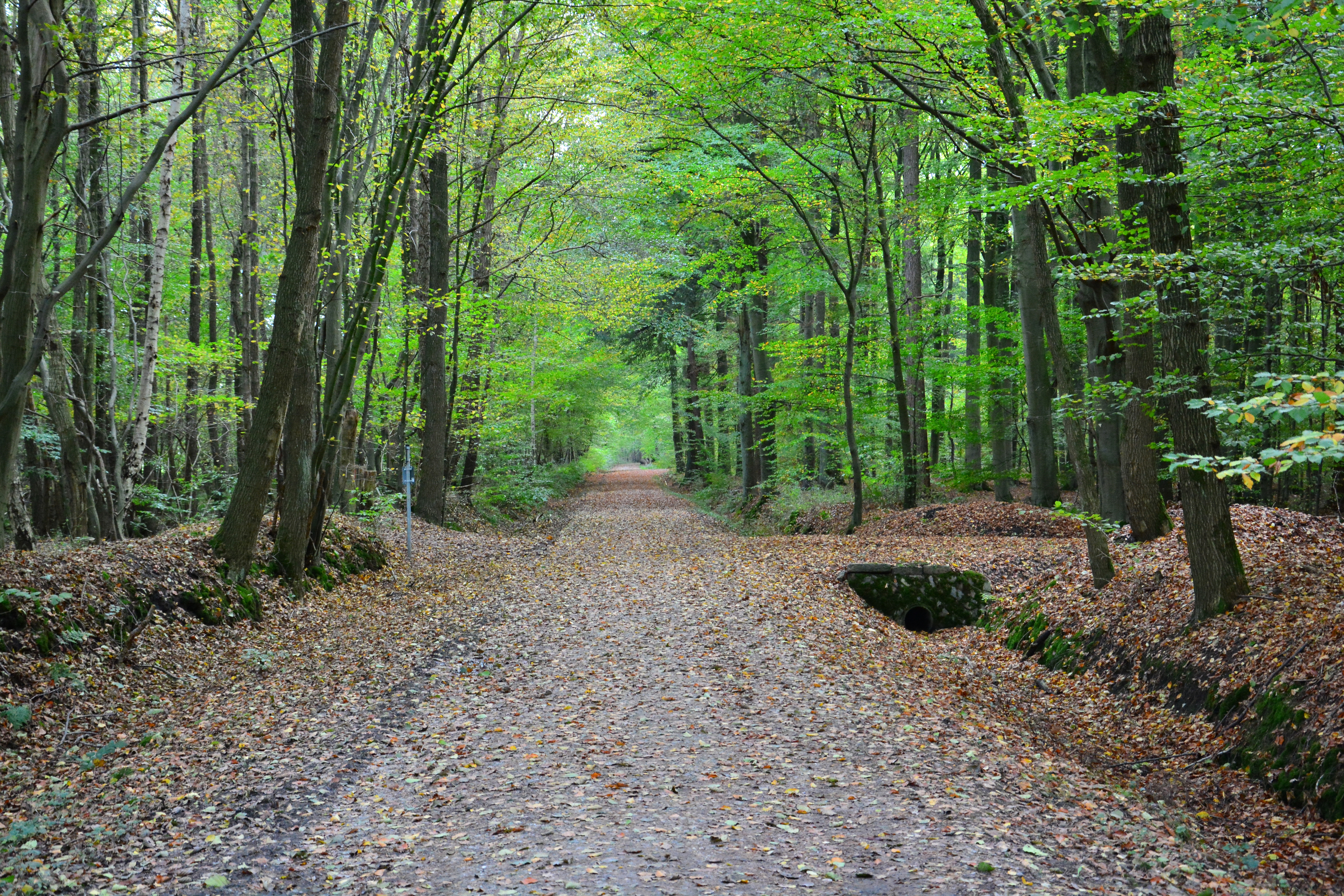
Forest road in Klövensteen

The Klövensteen is a woodland area west of Hamburg, Germany.

The forest covers an area of more than 513 ha (1,270 acres). The Klövensteen is located in the districts of Hamburg in Rissen and Sülldorf and also has parts in Schleswig-Holstein namely in the towns of Pinneberg and Wedel and in the communities of Appen and Holm. Originally the Klövensteen was part of a 100 km (62 mi) long inland dune, which lasted from the last Ice age and extended over an area from the northern Elbe, from the present-day Kiel Canal over the Haseldorf marsh to Geesthacht. The forest was created through afforestation in the 19th century.

== Area ==
The area of the Klövensteen mainly consists of mixed woodlands with hardwood trees and conifers, broken up by open fields and clearings. Southwest of the Klövensteen lies the Schnaakenmoor nature reserve. Schnaakenmoor consist mainly of marshes and is home to a number of rare animal and plant species. The southern border of the Klövensteen is along the Wedeler Au, a river which begins in Hamburg-Sülldorf and flows into the Elbe. Some of the typical animals can be seen in a game reserve ("Wildgehege Klövensteen"), especially fallow deer, sika deer, red deer and wild boar.

The Klövensteen is presently used for agriculture and forestry as well as a recreational area.
