= Insect hotel =

Manmade structure to provide shelter for insects

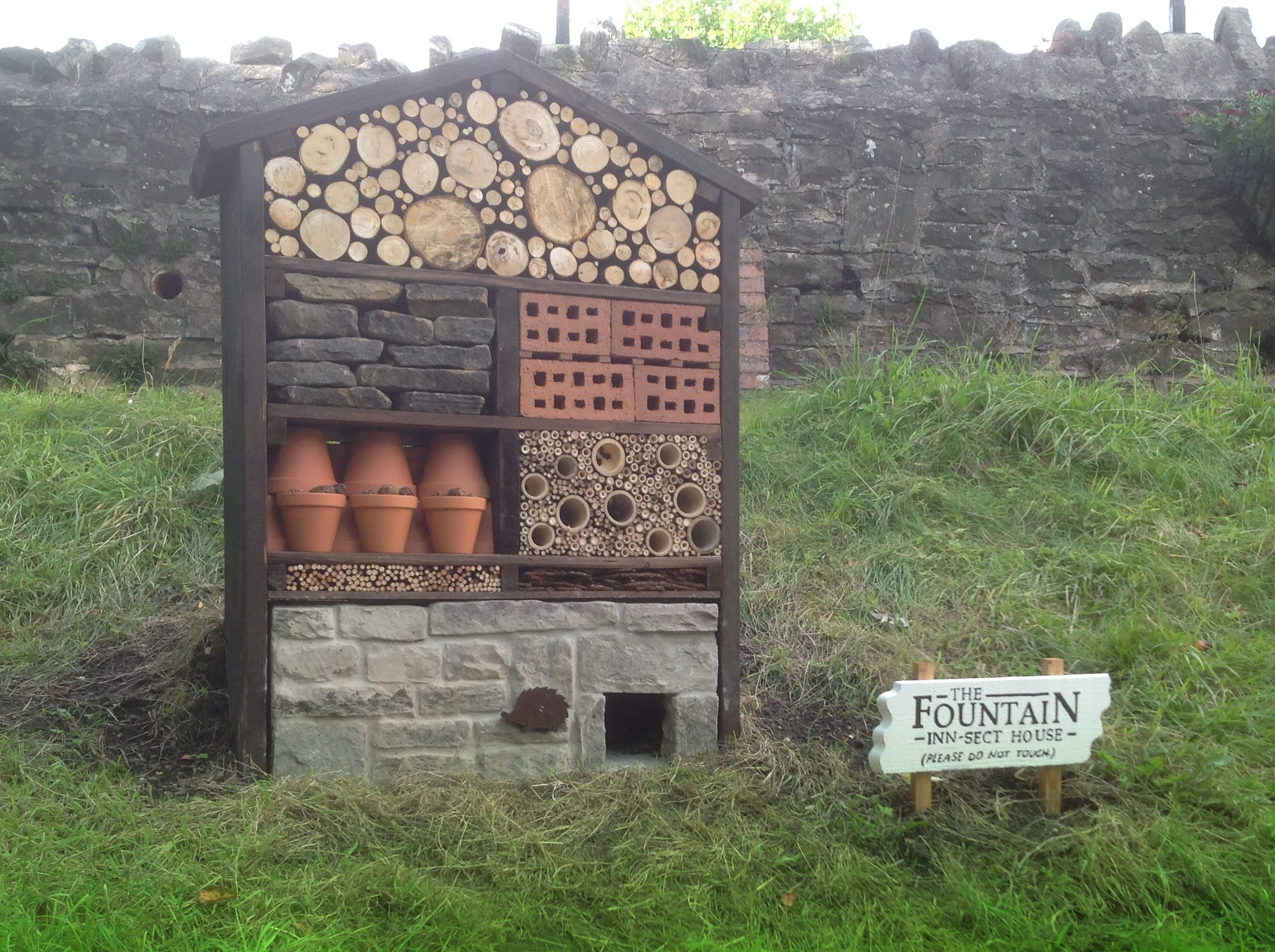
Insect house in Parkend, the Forest of Dean, UK

An insect hotel, also known as a bug hotel or insect house, is a manmade structure created to provide shelter for insects. They can come in a variety of shapes and sizes depending on the specific purpose or specific insect it is catered to. Most consist of several different sections that provide insects with nesting facilities – particularly during winter, offering shelter or refuge for many types of insects. Their purposes include hosting pollinators.

== Purpose ==
Many insect hotels are used as nest sites by insects including solitary bees and solitary wasps. These insects drag prey to the nest where an egg is deposited. Other insects hotels are specifically designed to allow the insects to hibernate, notable examples include ladybirds (ladybugs) and, arguably, butterflies.

Insect hotels are popular amongst gardeners and fruit and vegetable growers due to their role encouraging insect pollination. Some elaborately designed insect hotels may also be attractions in their own right and, increasingly, can be found in pub gardens and various tourist locations.

The introduction of insect hotels into a habitat provides valuable housing for beneficial insects. Impacts can be seen in the form of better soil quality, increased pollination, elevated ecosystem diversity, and reductions in the populations of detrimental insects.

== Different designs ==
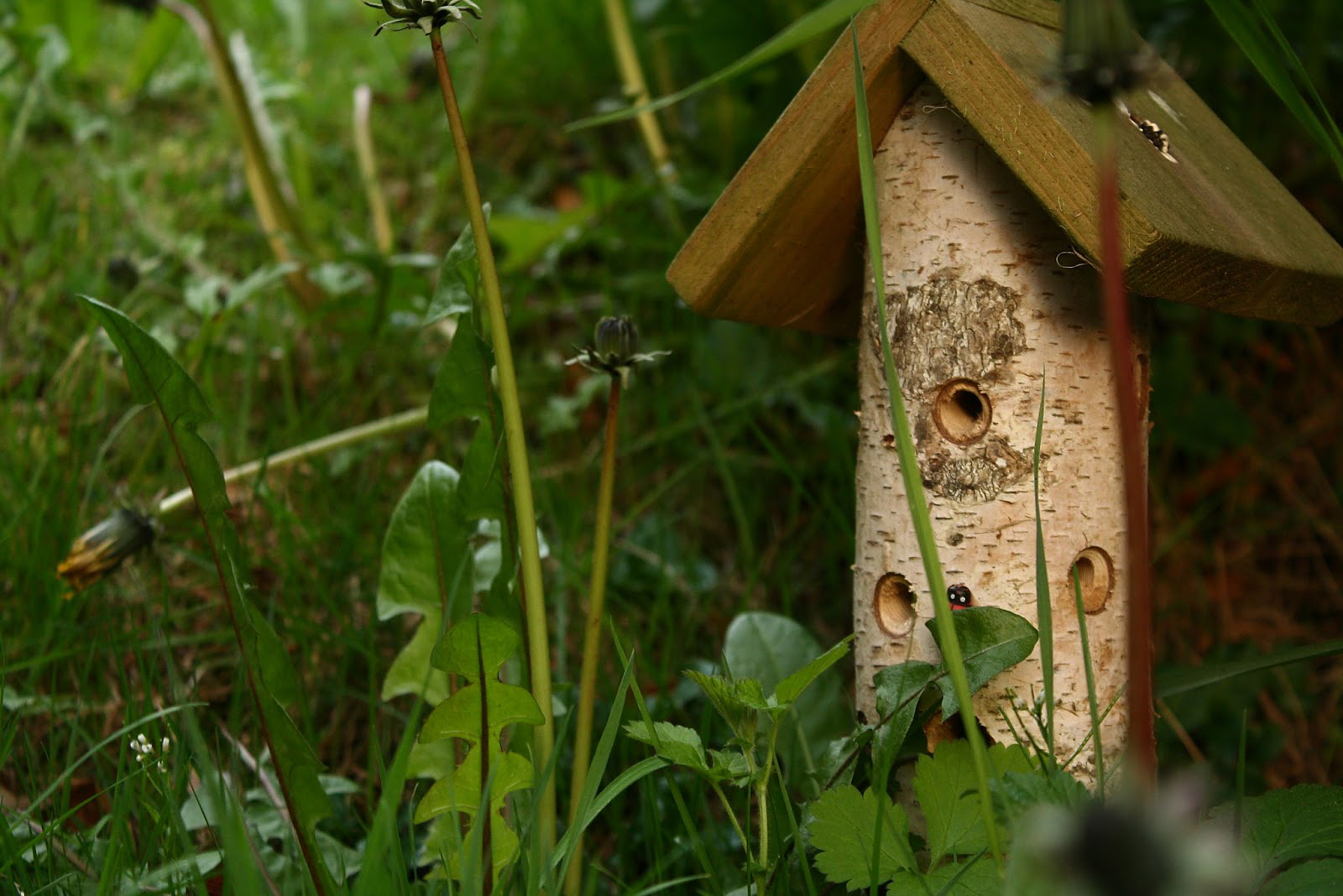
Ladybird hotel

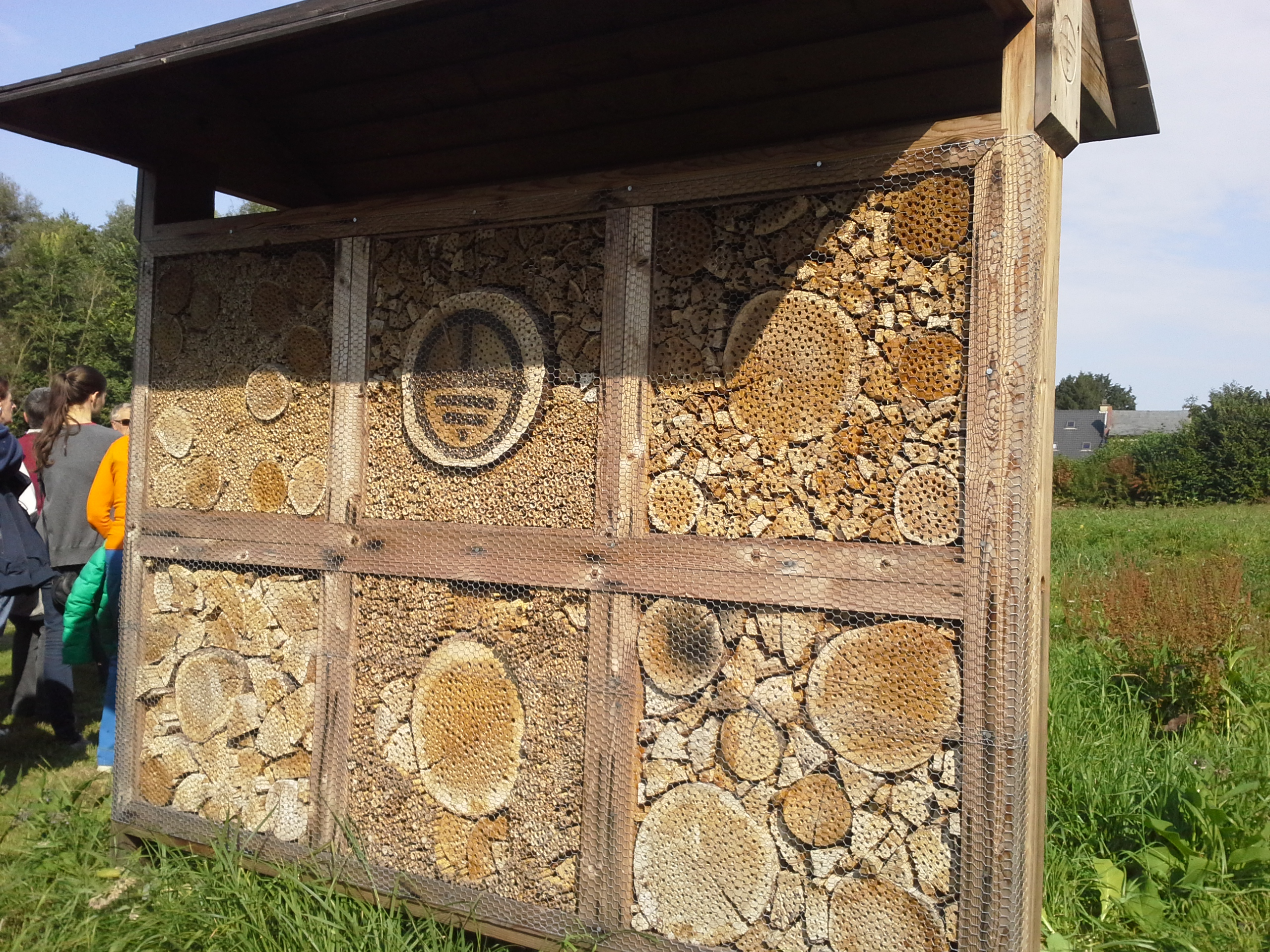
Bee hotel in Grimbergen, Belgium

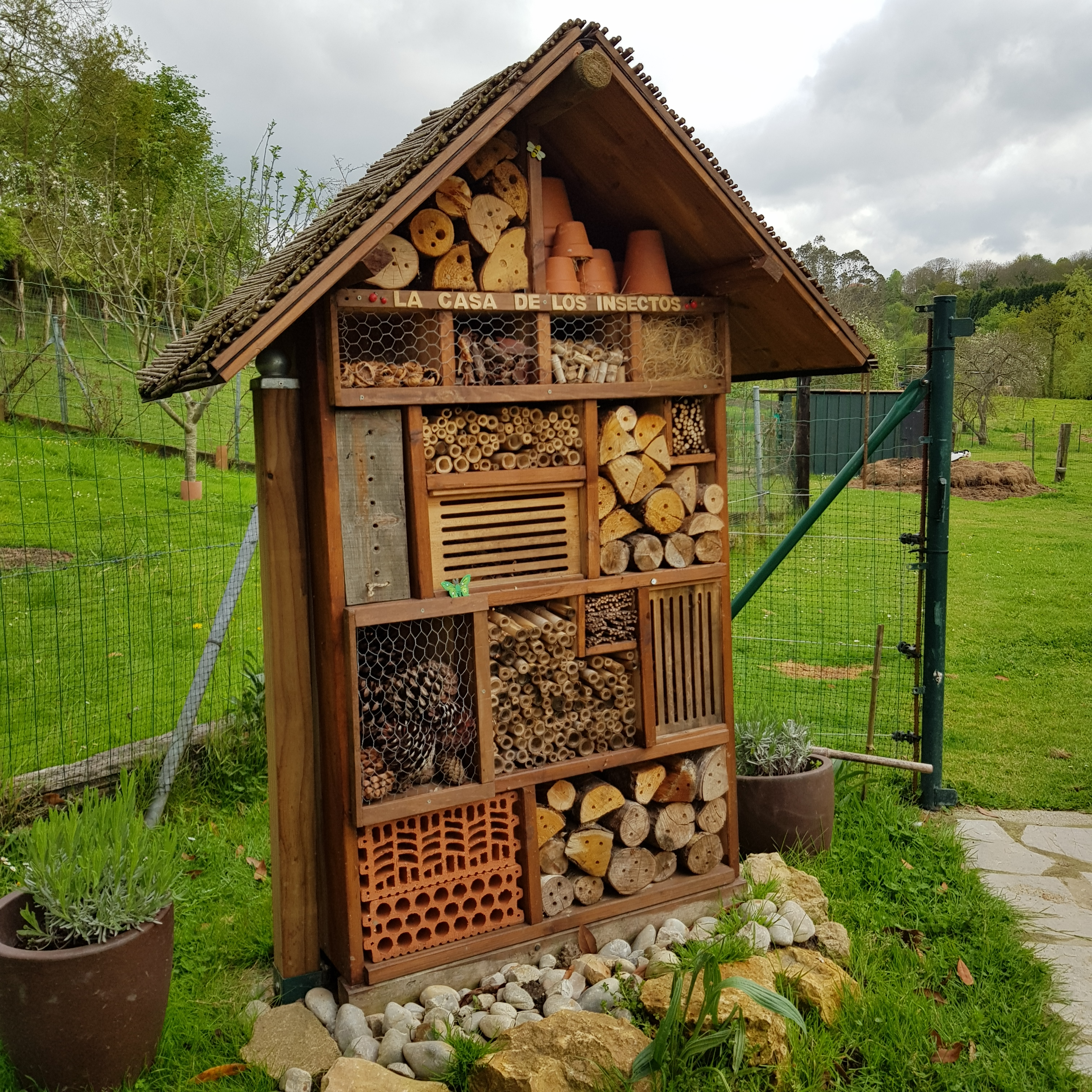
Bee hotel and Insect hotel in La CasaRoja Farm, Asturias, Spain

Examples of insect hotel materials include dry stone walls and old tiles. Drilled holes in the hotel materials can encourage insects to leave larvae to gestate. Different materials, such as stones and woods can be used for a wide range and diversity of insect life. Logs and bark, and bound reeds and bamboo are also often used. The various components or sizes of holes to use as entry of an insect hotel attract different species. Ready-made insect hotels are also found at garden centers, and particularly ecological and educational conservational centers and organisations.

=== Solitary bees and wasps ===
Solitary bees, and solitary wasps do not live within a hive with a queen.

Various species of solitary bees have different needs. The vast majority of these nest in tunnels dug in bare soil, but carpenter, mason, and leaf cutter bees nest in a tube. Only the latter two types nest in ready-made tubes in a bee hotel. They have species-specific preferences for tube diameter (2–10 mm) and length (about 10 cm). A fertilized female makes a series of cells in a tube, one egg per cell provisioned with pollen and sealed with mud or leaf cuttings, respectively. These bees spend most of their life in a cell, as larva then cocoon over winter. They emerge in spring timed to pollinate fruit and almond trees. Males live very briefly as adults, just long enough to mate with females, who live just long enough to complete nesting. Most of these bees produce only one generation per year, i.e. the mature insects overwinter as imago in the brood cell. Some bivoltine species, on the other hand, have two generations.

A common type of bee hotel is created from a wooden log, portion of a cut tree trunk or a stone block in which holes are drilled of different sizes (e.g. 2, 4, 6 and 8 mm) with the openings a few centimeters apart. The holes are slightly tilted upwards from the opening so rainwater can drain out, and are drilled about 10 cm into the material, while keeping the end solid. The entrances to these burrows must be smooth enough so that the delicate bodies of the insects are not damaged, with the exterior of wooden bee hotels being frequently sanded.

The best location for a bee hotel is a warm and sheltered place, such as a southern-facing (in the northern hemisphere) wall or hedge. The first insects are already active towards the end of winter and would be actively seeking for such a place to settle.

Other species tend to furnish their nests with clay, stone and sand, or in between bricks.

Generally, bee hotels are in place for only one season, replaced with fresh material in spring, because some solitary wasps lay eggs in the egg, larva, or coccoon of tube nesting bees. The cells may also contain fly maggots or pollen mites that killed the bee larva. Clean tubes for the nesting bees in spring will also remove parasitoid larva, failed bee larva, and other detritus.

Many bee enthusiasts put out blocks of wood with tubes drilled and cut so that the layers can be separated to view and remove tube contents during the winter. Others prefer cardboard tubes, each lined with a replaceable paper tube or designed to be torn open. In all three cases, healthy cocoons are removed to an emergence box, kept cool over winter, and put out as spring buds break. Parasitoids are destroyed.

A simple bundle of bamboo or reeds, tied or put in an old tin can and hung in a warm place, may be suitable for some solitary bees. The bamboo must be cut in a specific way to allow entry for the insects. Often people may add stems of elderberry, rose or blackberry shoots whose marrow can serve as a food source as well.

=== Butterflies ===
Butterflies that hibernate prefer sheltered places such as crevices in houses and sheds, or enclosed spaces such as those in bundles of leaves. Some insect hotels incorporate special butterfly enclosures with vertical slits that take into account the animals' sensitive wings, but the suitability of these enclosures for butterflies is disputed.

=== Parasitic insects ===
By using an insect hotel, parasitic insects are also attracted to make use of the facilities. Cuckoo bees and wasps will lay their eggs within the nests of others in order to provide them with readily available food upon hatching without the parent insect having to provide for them.

Hotels also attract predatory insects which help control unwanted bugs. For example, earwigs are good to have present in and near fruit trees as they eat the plant lice that may settle on the tree and disturb fruit growth. A terracotta flower pot hung upside-down, filled with bundles of straw or wood wool is an ideal house for earwigs. Ladybirds are easy to cater for by placing many twigs within an open wooden box on its side to provide many small cavities. Ladybirds prefer to hibernate in larger groups so this will encourage many to settle in one specific place. Isopods have their usefulness as scavengers in the garden. These animals like large gaps between stacked bricks and roof tiles to shelter from rain and to hide from predators.

== Environmental impacts ==
Insect hotels are generally thought to be a positive force in restoring or maintaining wild pollinator populations, especially native bees, many of which are endangered due to various factors such as competition with introduced bees like the western honey bee. Insect hotels are especially thought to be a valuable resource for insects that have had their primary natural habitat destroyed. An example is Anthidium palliventre, which were common in the sand dunes of the San Francisco area – the species has struggled as the dunes have mostly been paved over for urban development. Such insects are often forced to find alternative housing, such as in city parks, typically with less success. Over half of North America's native wild bees face similar difficulties, and the actual number is possibly greater due to insufficient data on certain species. Bee hotels are sometimes constructed, whether by private actors, such as well-meaning homeowners and gardeners, or by government-led conservation projects, in attempts to remedy this issue and provide habitat to stabilize struggling native bee populations.

A few recent studies suggest the possibility, however, that bee hotels, in particular, might do more harm than good in certain situations. In a 2020 study, urban bee hotels in the city of Marseille, France, were found to be primarily inhabited by an exotic bee species, M. structuralis, whose presence correlated with lower native bee numbers in the area. A separate study in 2015 reported that bee hotels might be habitats for introduced bees and native bee natural enemies such as predatory and parasitic wasps, rather than habitats for endangered native bees, as well as potentially being focal points of insect diseases and further putting native bees at risk. Special attention must be given to the details of insect hotels, such as the diameter of the holes, as this is a key factor in which insects are attracted to the hotel – a variation in diameter of just 1 mm can make the difference between providing habitat for native bees with more specialized habitat needs, or the more generalist adaptable introduced bees they compete with. An alternative solution entirely might be more beneficial for conservation, however, as most wild solitary bees tend to nest underground and are not usually attracted to bee hotels. A scientific study conducted in Germany in 2014 shows that only three of the 40 nesting aids examined can be considered suitable for colonization. As of 2021, the major hardware store chains and garden centers still offer insect hotels that are at least 90% unsuitable or completely unsuitable.

== Gallery ==
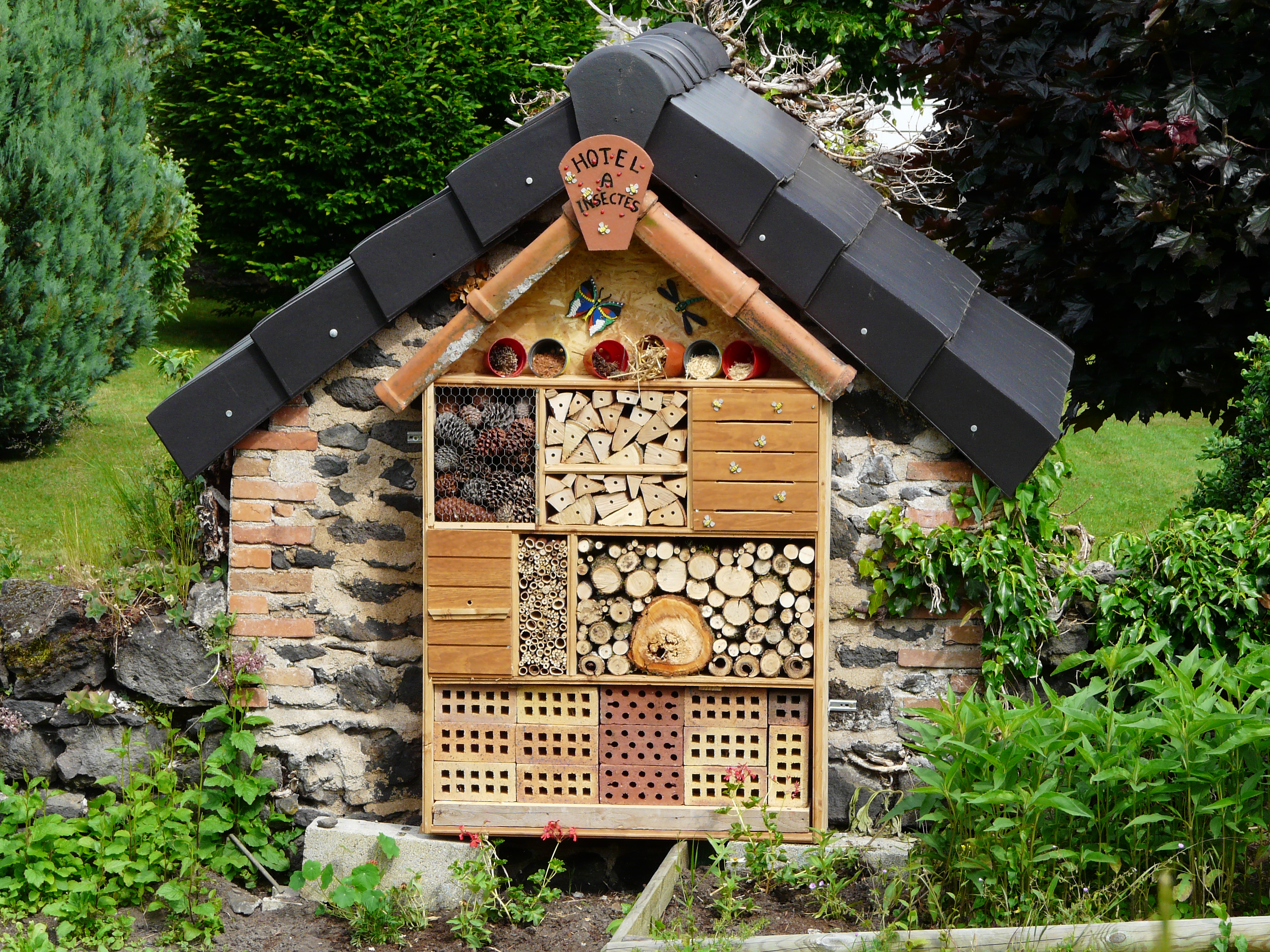
Insect house in Pontgibaud, Puy-de-Dôme, France

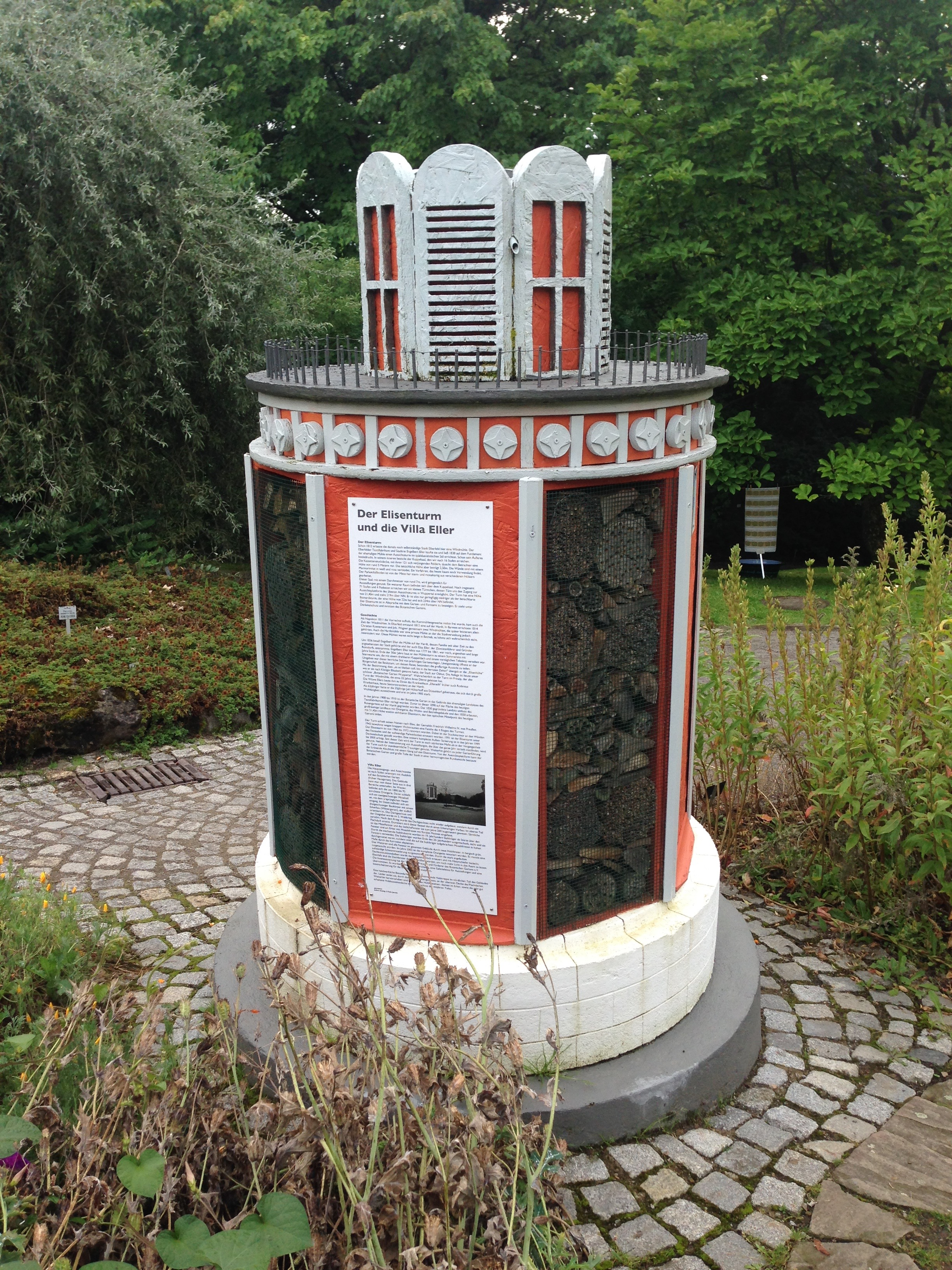
Insect hotel in the botanical garden of Wuppertal, Germany

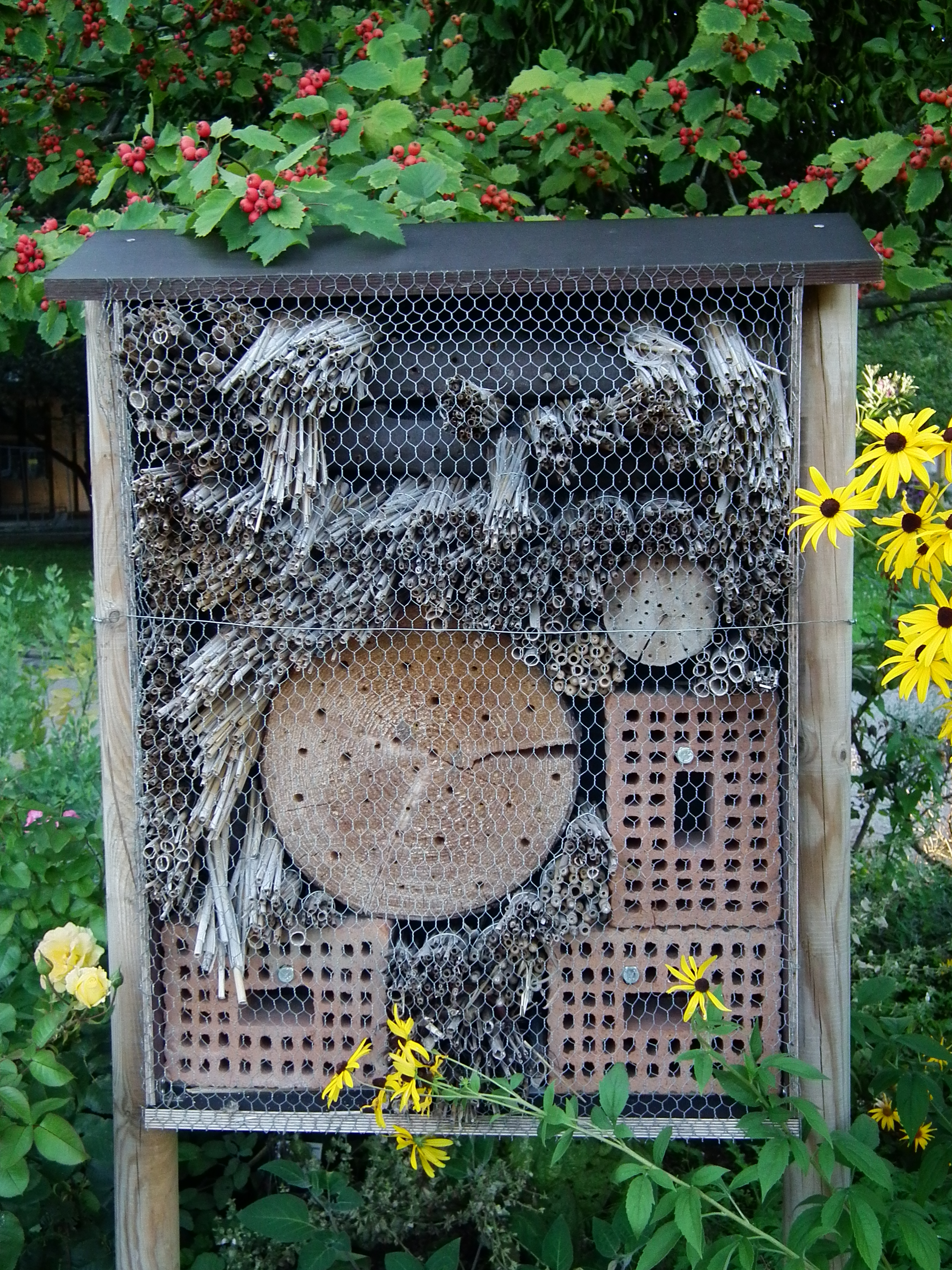
Insect hotel in the botanical garden of Heidelberg, Germany

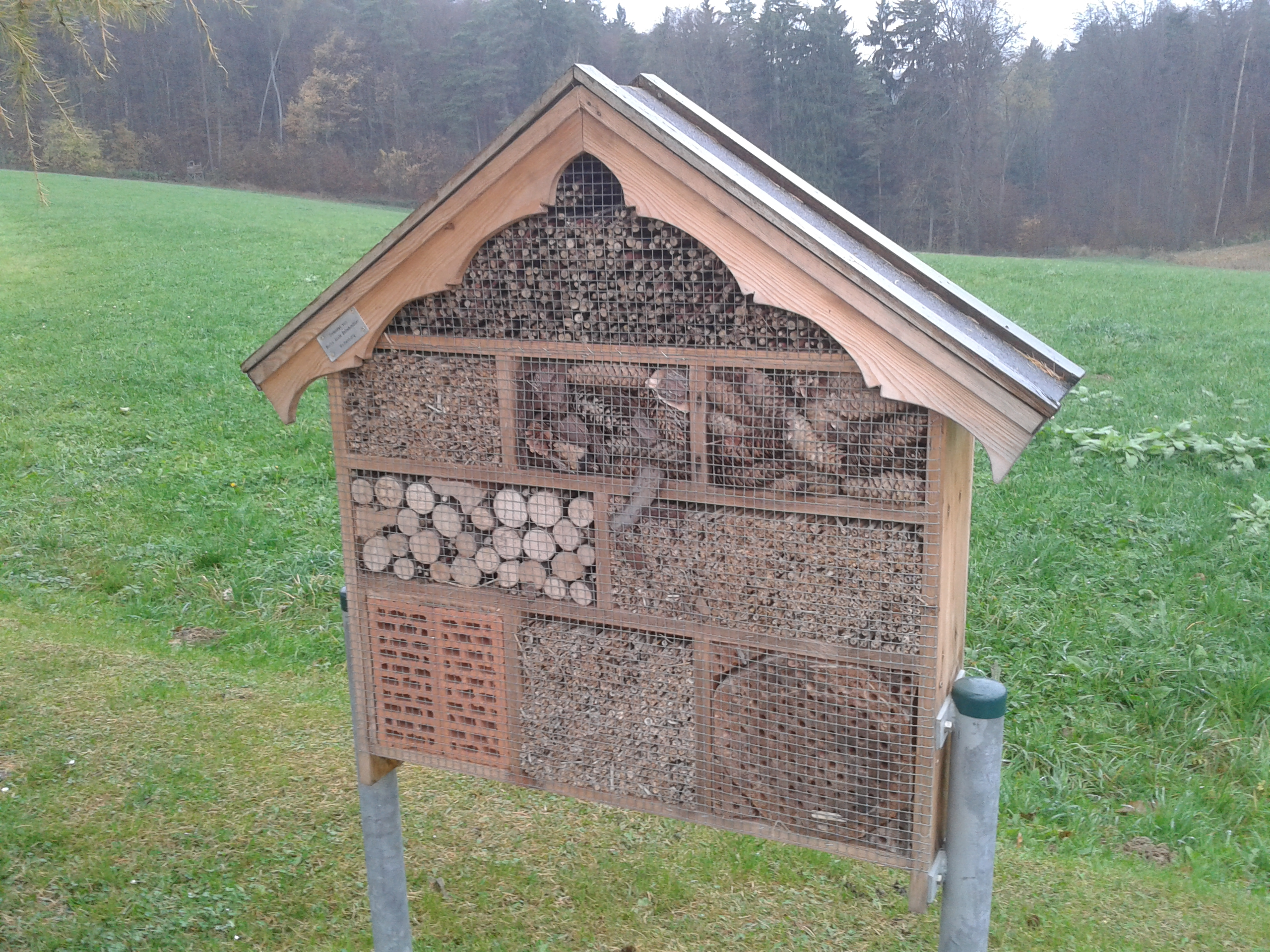
Insect hotel near Kelheim, Germany

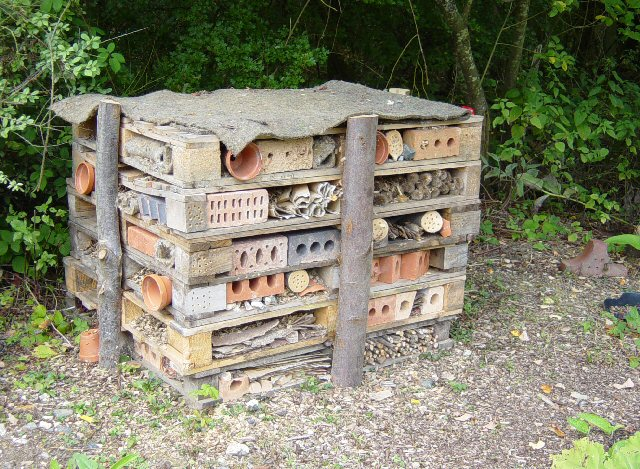
Insect hotel made from wooden pallets, West Grinstead railway station, West Sussex, United Kingdom

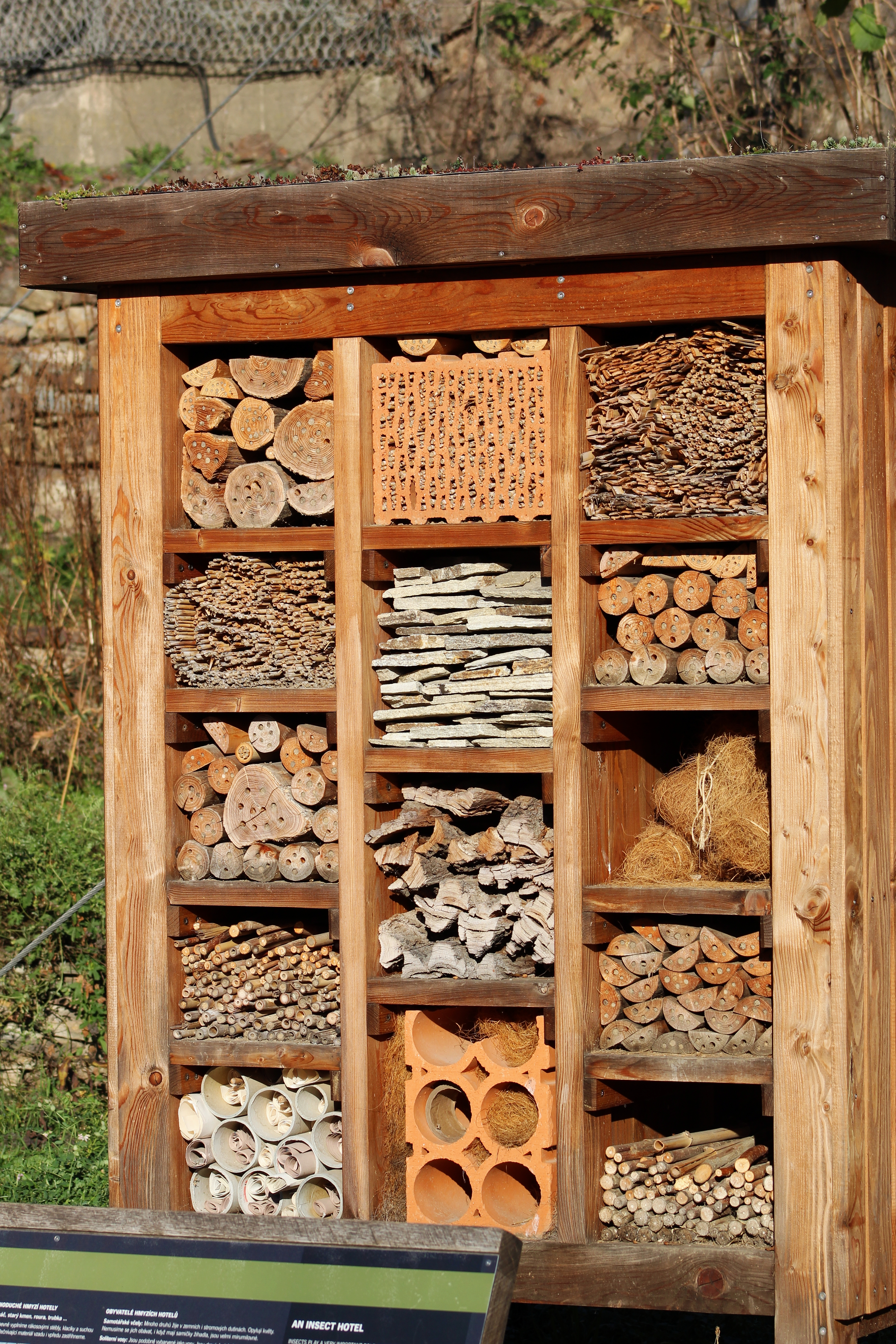
Insect hotel in the Czech Republic

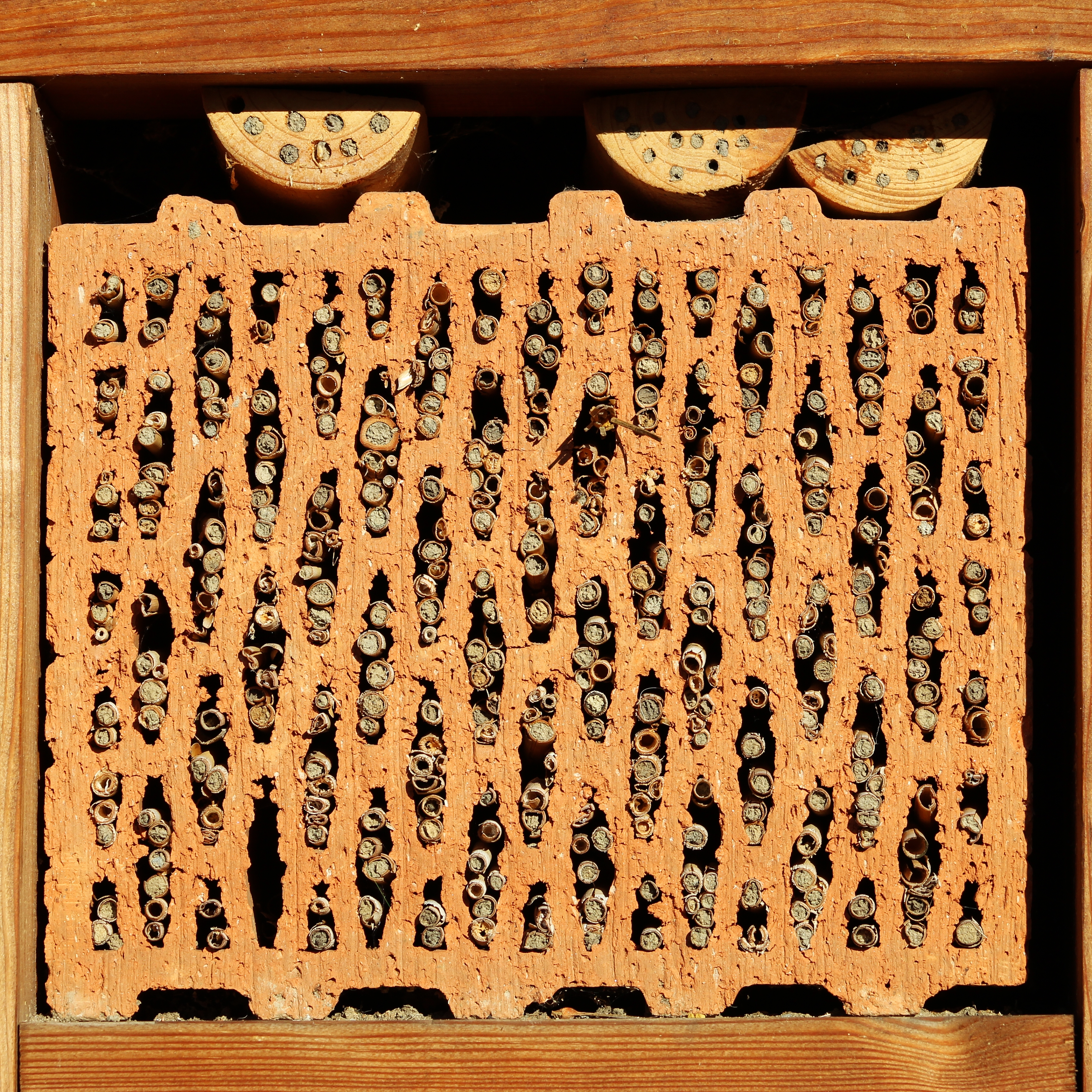
Insect hotel in the Czech Republic

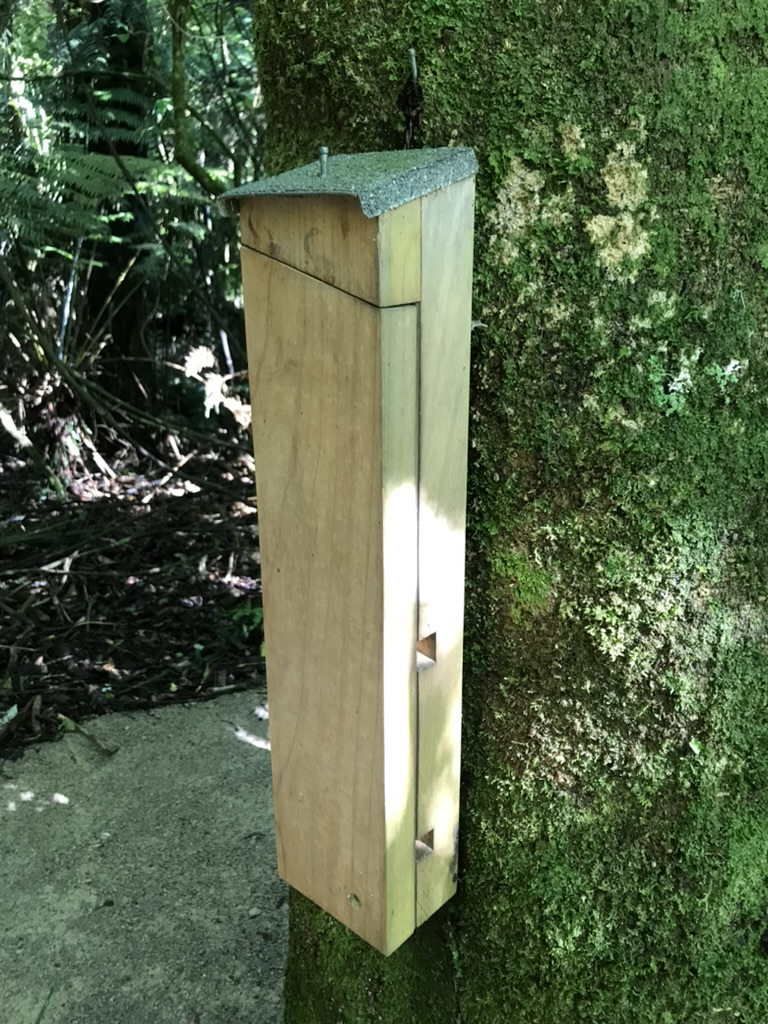
Wētā (Hemideina sp.) hotel in New Zealand

== See also ==
- Beetle bank
- Dead hedge
- Hibernaculum (zoology)
- Insectary plant
- Nest box
- Roach Motel

== Bibliography ==
- "Landmark Report: Hundreds of Native Bee Species Sliding Toward Extinction" (press release). Center for Biological Diversity. Retrieved 2022-05-29.
  - Kopec, Kelsey; Burd, Lori Ann (February 2017). Pollinators in Peril: A Systematic Status Review of North American and Hawaiian Native Bees (PDF) (Report). Center for Biological Diversity.
- Geslin, Benoît; Gachet, Sophie; Deschamps-Cottin, Magali; Flacher, Floriane; Ignace, Benjamin; Knoploch, Corentin; Meineri, Éric; Robles, Christine; Ropars, Lise; Schurr, Lucie; Le Féon, Violette (2020-05-01). "Bee Hotels Host a High Abundance of Exotic Bees in an Urban Context". Acta Oecologica. 105: 103556. doi:10.1016/j.actao.2020.103556. ISSN 1146-609X.
- Geslin, Benoit; Ropars, Lise; Zakardjian, Marie; Flacher, Floriane (2022-01-26). "The Misplaced Management of Bees". doi:10.22541/au.164319695.57033003/v1.
- MacIvor, J. Scott; Packer, Laurence (2015-03-18). "'Bee Hotels' as Tools for Native Pollinator Conservation: A Premature Verdict?" PLoS One. 10 (3): e0122126. doi:10.1371/journal.pone.0122126. ISSN 1932-6203. PMC 4364699. PMID 25785609.
- Russo, Laura; de Keyzer, Charlotte W; Harmon-Threatt, Alexandra N; LeCroy, Kathryn A; MacIvor, James Scott (2021-08-01). "The Managed-to-Invasive Species Continuum in Social and Solitary Bees and Impacts on Native Bee Conservation". Current Opinion in Insect Science. Special Section on Pollinator Decline: Human and Policy Dimensions * Social Insects. 46: 43–49. doi:10.1016/j.cois.2021.01.001. ISSN 2214-5745.
- Underwood, Emily (2020). "Small Wonders: The Plight and Promise of California's Native Bees". California Native Plant Society. 2021-06-25. Retrieved 2022-05-29.
