= Beetle bank =

Biological pest control

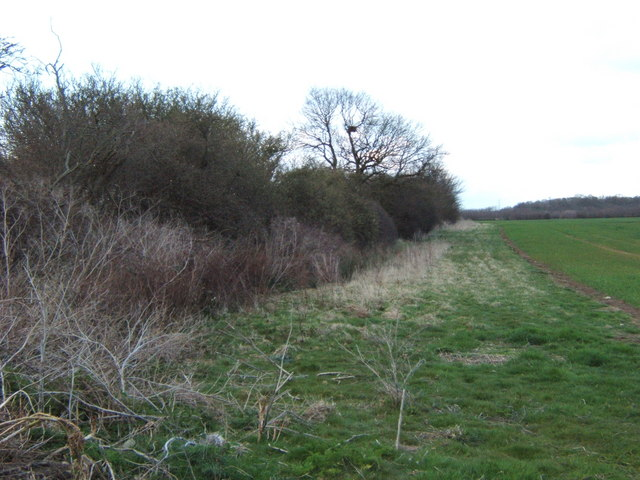
A strip around a field left fallow to serve as a beetle bank.

In agriculture and horticulture, a beetle bank is a form of biological pest control. It is a strip, preferably raised, planted with grasses (bunch grasses) and/or perennial plants, within a crop field or a garden, that fosters and provides habitat for beneficial insects, birds, and other fauna that prey on pests.

== Usage ==
Beetle banks are typically made up from plants such as sunflowers, Vicia faba, Centaurea cyanus, coriander, borage, Muhlenbergia, Stipa, and buckwheats (Eriogonum spp.). Beetle banks are used to reduce or replace the use of insecticides by encouraging ground beetles and other predators, such as birds and beneficial rodents, which then prey on crop pests. For example, insects such as Chrysoperla carnea and the Ichneumon fly can prey on pests. Ground beetles may prey on crop pests such as aphids and cucumber beetle larvae.

The concept was developed by the Game & Wildlife Conservation Trust in collaboration with the University of Southampton. Government initiatives in the United Kingdom as well as the United States have offered subsidies for farmers to construct beetle banks in order to provide integrated pest control, prevent soil erosion, and create nesting habitat for birds and other wildlife. They are relatively inexpensive to set up and maintain compared with active pest management such as pesticides.

Other important benefits can be providing habitat for pollinators and endangered species. If using local native plants, endemic and indigenous flora and fauna restoration ecology is supported.

== History of the term ==
According to a March 2005 draft entry for the Oxford English Dictionary, the term first came into use in the early 1990s, with published examples including the August 22, 1992 issue of the New Scientist and an October 12, 1994 reference in The Guardian society section:

'Beetle banks', a recent initiative by the Game Conservancy Trust, would also help encourage ground-nesting birds while creating cover for aphid-eating bugs with more pay-off in savings on aphicides.

== See also ==
- Beneficial insects
- Buffer strip
- Insect hotel
- List of companion plants
- List of pest-repelling plants
- Wildflower strip
